= List of German restaurants =

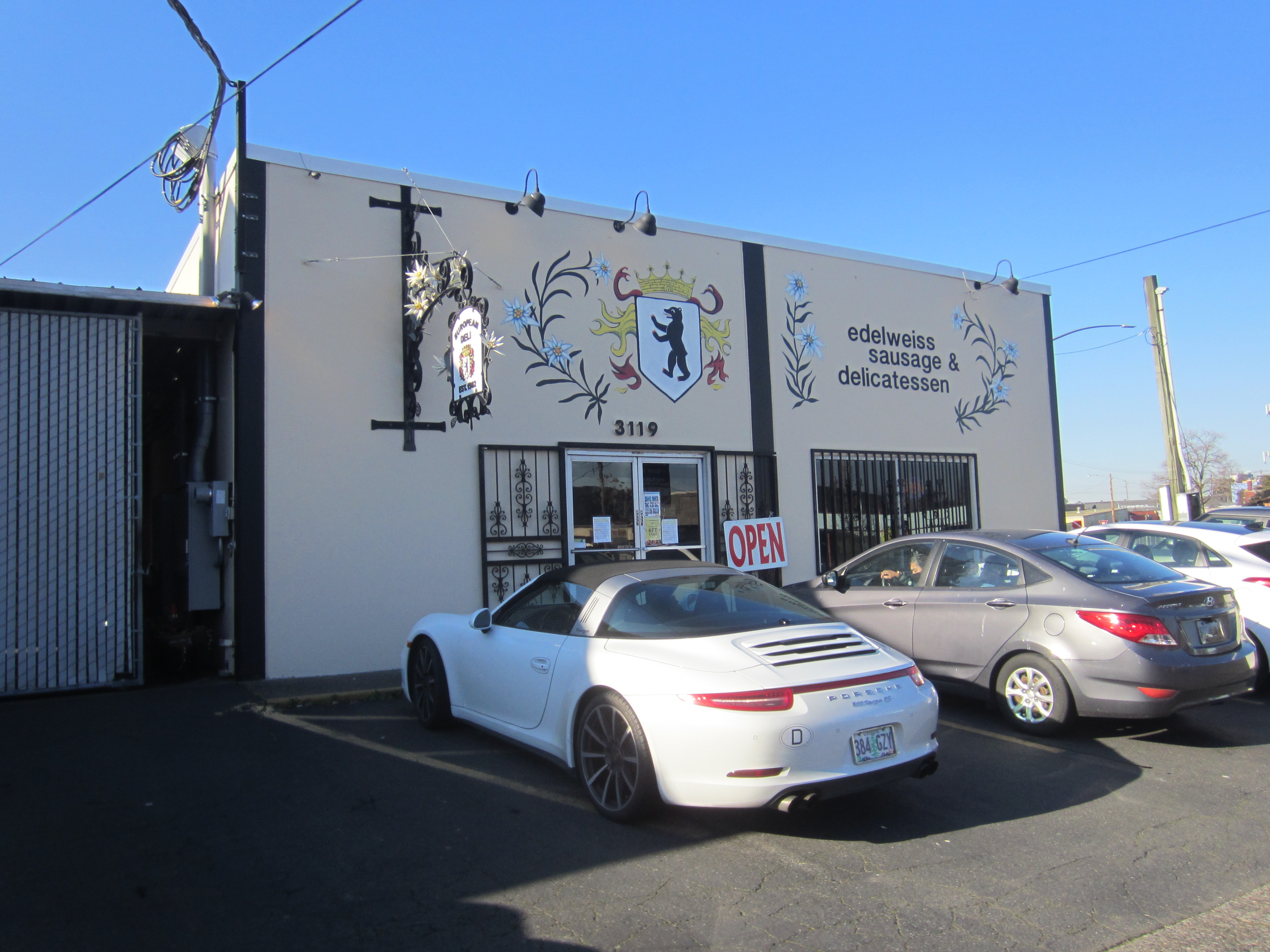
Edelweiss Sausage & Delicatessen, Portland, Oregon, U.S.

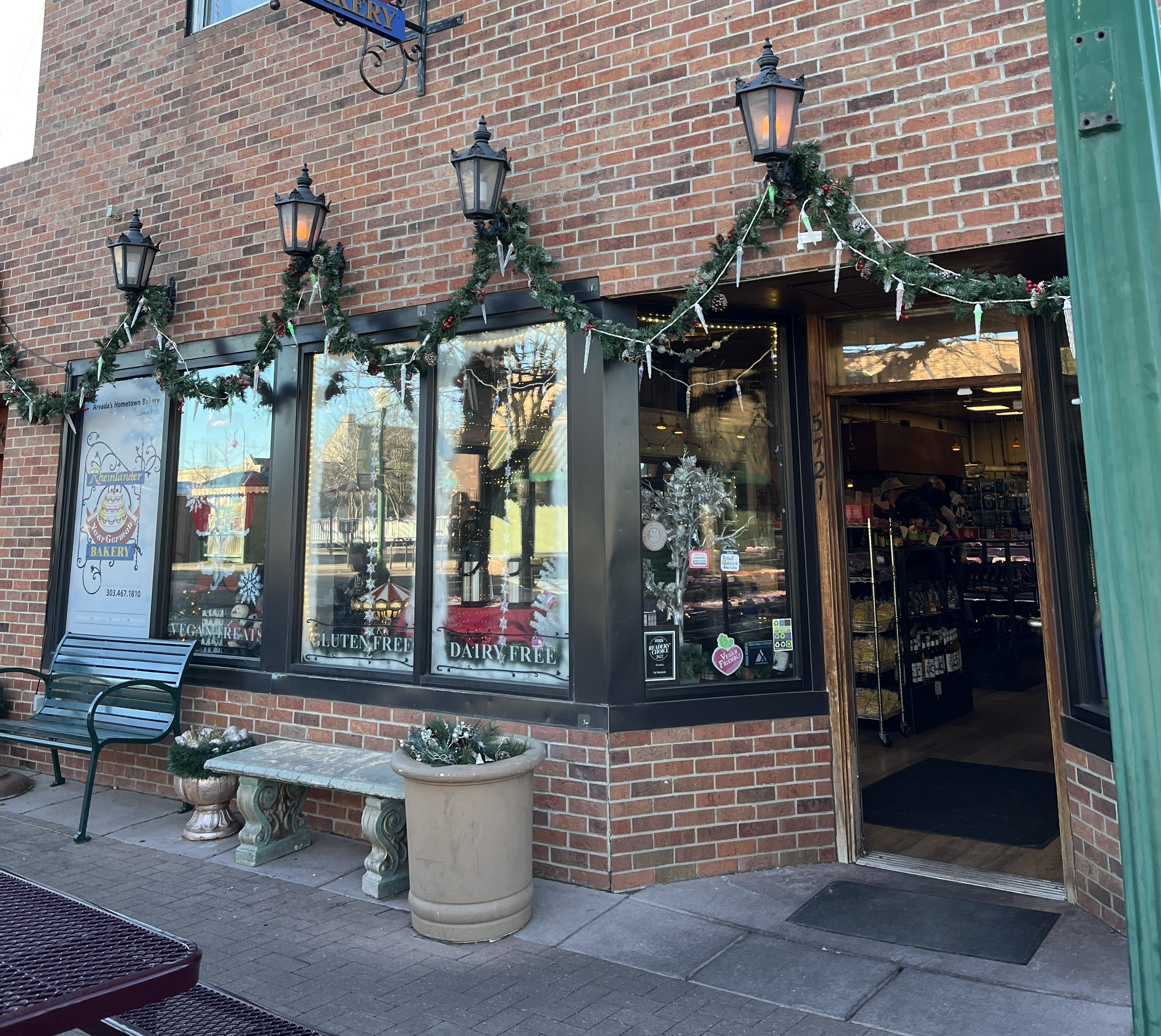
Rheinlander Bakery, Arvada, Colorado, U.S.

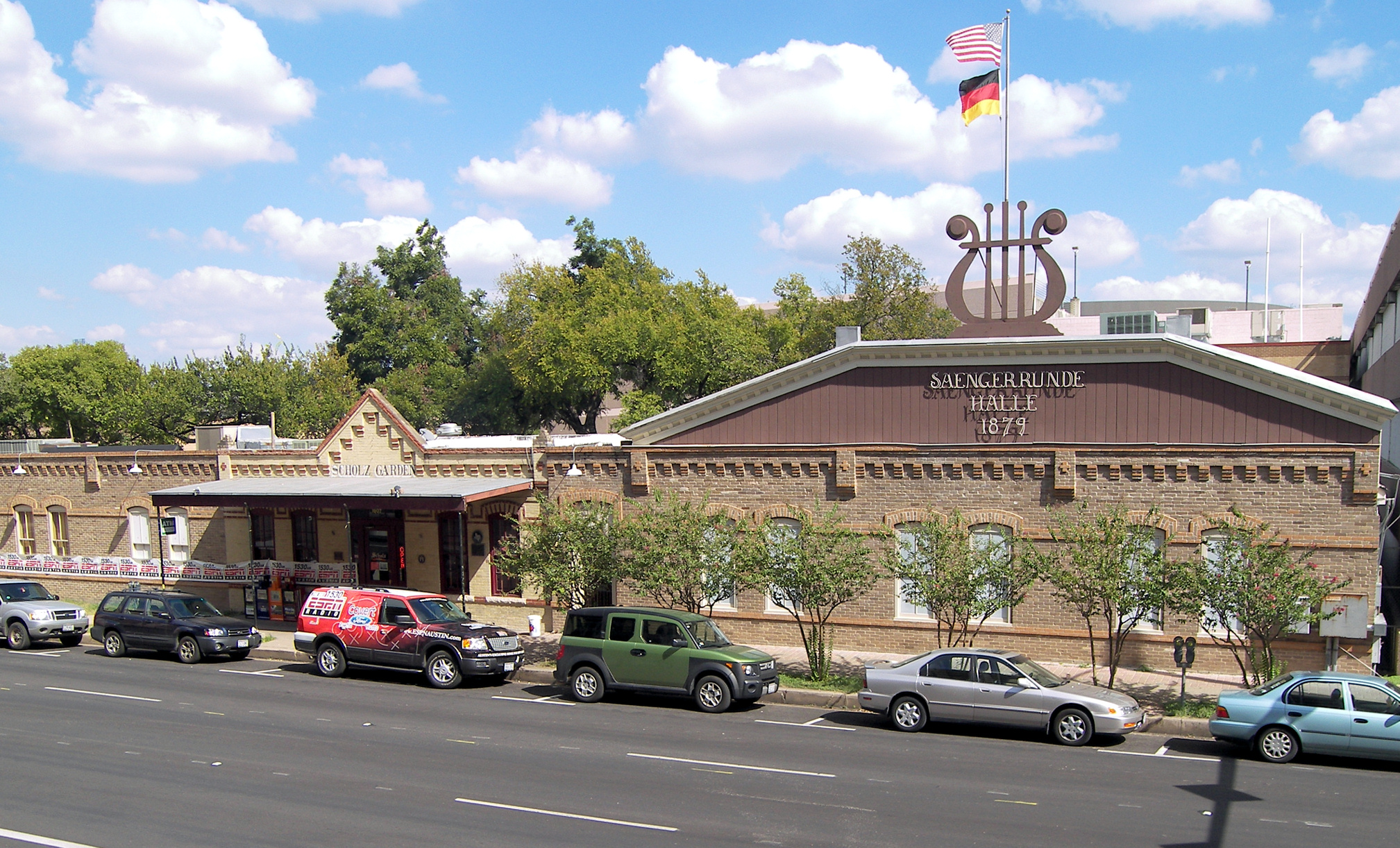
Scholz Garten, Austin, Texas, U.S.

Following is a list of notable restaurants known for serving German cuisine:

- Alte Taverne
- Andechs (restaurant) – Monastery restaurant in Andechs Abbey, Bavaria, German
- Bavarian Meats – Meat producer in Seattle, Washington, U.S.
- Berlin Inn – Defunct German restaurant in Portland, Oregon, US
- Der Rheinlander – Defunct German restaurant in Portland, Oregon, U.S.
- Edelweiss Sausage & Delicatessen – Delicatessen in Portland, Oregon, U.S.
- Grüner (restaurant) – Defunct restaurant in Portland, Oregon, U.S.
- Heartbreak (restaurant) – Defunct restaurant in New York City, U.S.
- Henry Thiele Restaurant – Defunct restaurant in Portland, Oregon, US
- Herman ze German – Chain of fast food restaurants in London
- Harmonie German Club – Social club in Canberra, Australia
- Hofbräuhaus Columbus – Brewery and restaurant in Ohio, U.S.
- Jacob Wirth Restaurant – Defunct restaurant in Boston, Massachusetts
- Lüchow's – Defunct restaurant in Manhattan, New York
- Mecklenburg's Garden
- Olympia Provisions Public House – Defunct restaurant chain in the U.S. state of Oregon
- Peter Luger Steak House – Restaurant in Brooklyn, New York, U.S.
- Prost (restaurant) – Small chain of German restaurants in the United States
- Quisisana – German food-service company
- Rhein Haus Seattle – German restaurant in Seattle, Washington, U.S.
- Rheinlander Bakery – Restaurant in Arvada, Colorado, U.S.
- Runza – American fast food restaurant chain
- Scholz Garten – Beer garden and restaurant in Austin, Texas, U.S.
- Schmidt's Sausage Haus – German restaurant in Columbus, Ohio
- Slide Inn – Restaurant in Portland, Oregon, U.S.
- Staatliches Hofbräuhaus in München – German brewery
- Stammtisch (restaurant) – German restaurant in Portland, Oregon, U.S.
- The Student Prince – German restaurant in Springfield, Massachusetts, U.S.
- Wolfgang's Steakhouse – American steakhouse chain
- Zinnkeller – Restaurant in Finland
- Zoiglhaus Brewing Company – Brewery and restaurant in Portland, Oregon, U.S.
