= Hermannsdenkmal =

German sculpture

Hermann Memorial
- Hermannsdenkmal
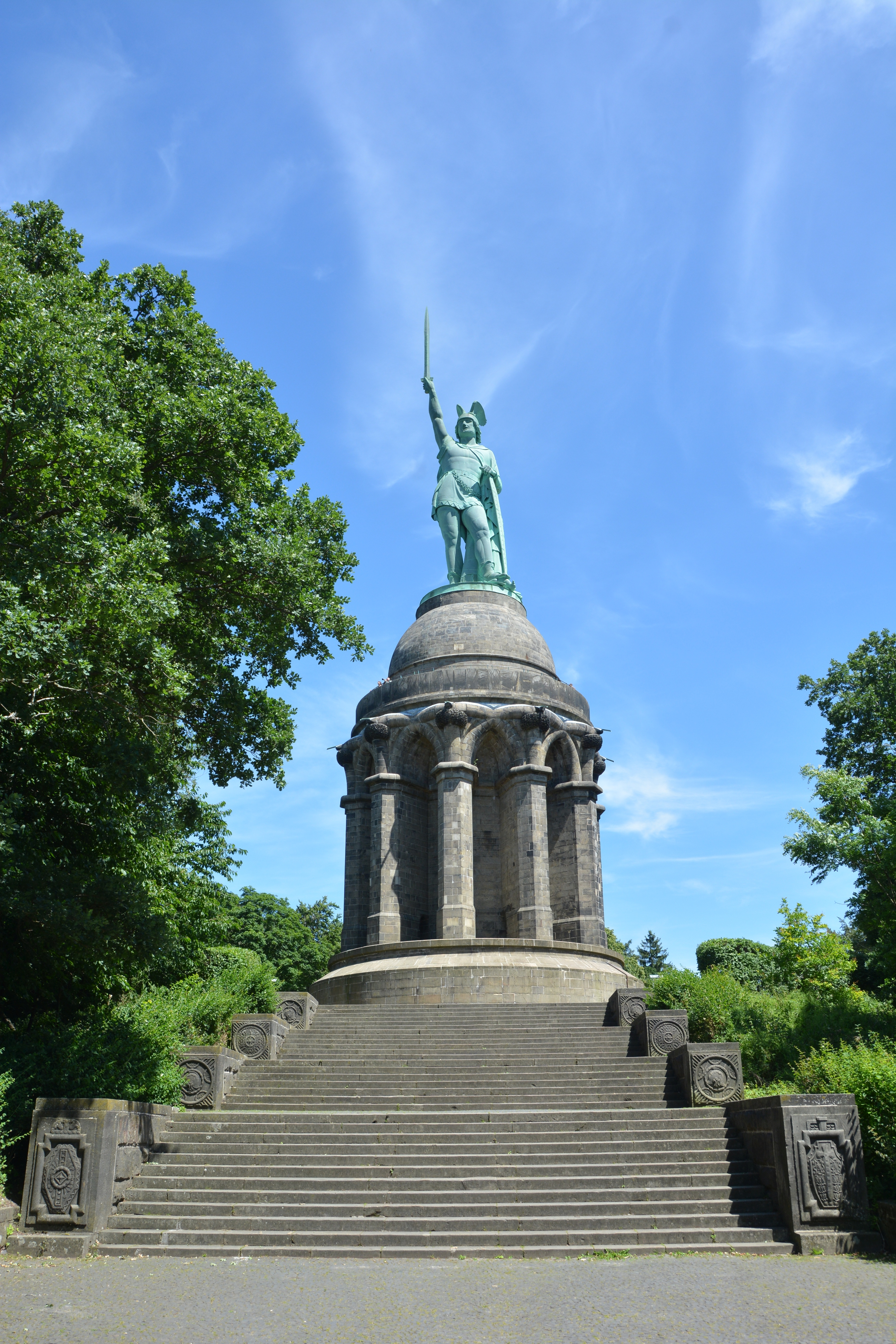
- Hermannsdenkmal
- Interactive map of Hermann Memorial
- Location: Teutoburger Wald, North Rhine-Westphalia, Germany
- Coordinates: 51°54′42″N 08°50′22″E
- Designer: Ernst von Bandel
- Type: Monument
- Material: Copper plates on iron frame, sandstone pedestal
- Height: 53.46 metres (175.4 ft); Pedestal and base: 26.89 metres (88.2 ft); Figure: 26.57 metres (87.2 ft)
- Beginning date: 1838
- Completion date: 1875
- Opening date: 1875
- Dedicated to: Arminius ("Hermann")

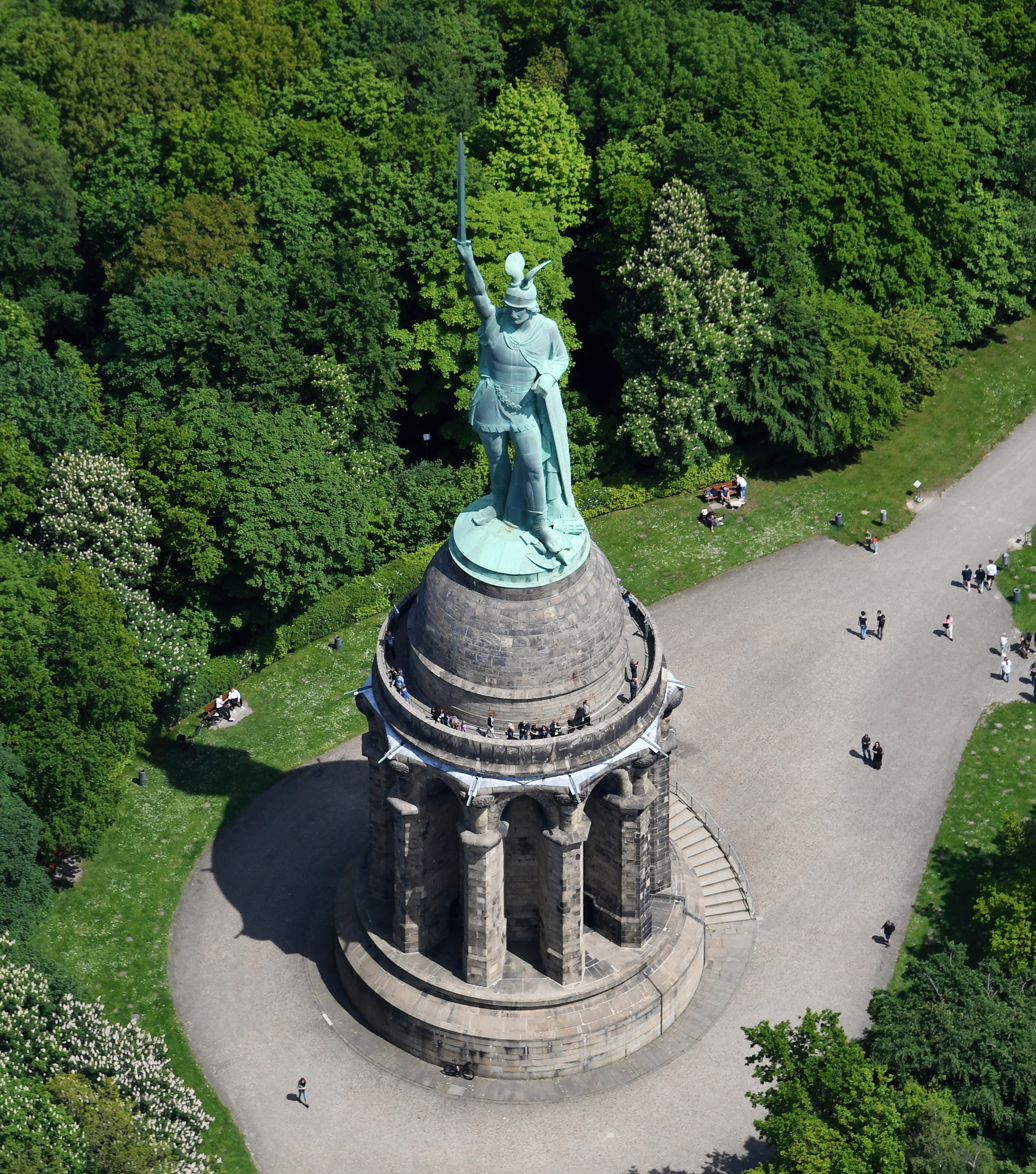
Aerial view of the Hermannsdenkmal

The Hermann Memorial (German: Hermannsdenkmal) is a monument located southwest of Detmold in the district of Lippe (North Rhine-Westphalia), in Germany. It stands on the densely forested Grotenburg, sometimes also called the Teutberg or Teut, a hill (elevation 386 m) in the Teutoburger Wald (Teutoburg Forest) range. The monument is located inside the remains of a circular rampart.

The monument was constructed between 1838 and 1875 to commemorate the Cherusci war chief Arminius (in German, Hermann) and his victory over Rome at the Battle of the Teutoburg Forest in 9 AD. When the statue was built, its location was believed to be near the original battle site, although experts now consider it more likely that the battle took place near Kalkriese, about 100 km to the north-west.

== Background ==
In 9 AD, Arminius, a chieftain of the Cherusci people and an auxiliary cavalry commander, turned against his Roman allies and led an alliance of Germanic tribes to ambush three legions under the leadership of provincial governor Publius Quinctilius Varus. The vast majority of the Roman legions were destroyed. To Rome and its Emperor Augustus the loss was a catastrophe and called the "Varian disaster".

This event later came to be seen as a vital turning point in Middle-European history as it may have been instrumental in limiting the advance of the Roman Empire into Germania. In the 1520s, Arminius was equated with the name "Hermann", perhaps first by Martin Luther.

Germany was among those countries where nationalism became a rising force in the 19th century as opposition to aristocratic rule increased. Equating the nation with all of its people rather than just with its rulers was a revolutionary idea at the time. In Germany, it became entwined with the hopes of many for an end to the disunity that had ruled the Holy Roman Empire at least since the Peace of Westphalia. Nationalists wanted one of the German princes to unite all of Germany under a single rule. In this regard, Arminius came to be seen as a symbol, since he allegedly had "united" the Germanic tribes. Reports by Roman historians on internecine fighting among the tribes were deliberately ignored.

Arminius (or "Hermann") thus became a subject of popular literature such as Friedrich Gottlieb Klopstock's three dramas on this topic (1769, 1784 and 1789). However, Heinrich von Kleist likely did most to popularise Arminius in Germany with his Hermannsschlacht (1808). At that point, the old Empire had been dissolved, the Kingdom of Prussia had been defeated and partially dismembered by Napoleon and all hopes of a German Great Power emerging in the foreseeable future seemed lost. In this situation, Arminius served as an historical role model ("Father of the German Nation") for those willing to continue the fight against the Empire of France, which was seen as the latest successor of the Roman Empire as an external enemy (via the Medieval Popes and the early modern Kingdom of France). The Congress of Vienna, which re-ordered Europe after Napoleon's final defeat, disappointed hopes for a unified Germany as the princes were mostly able to retain their independent powers in the new Deutscher Bund.

== History of the monument ==
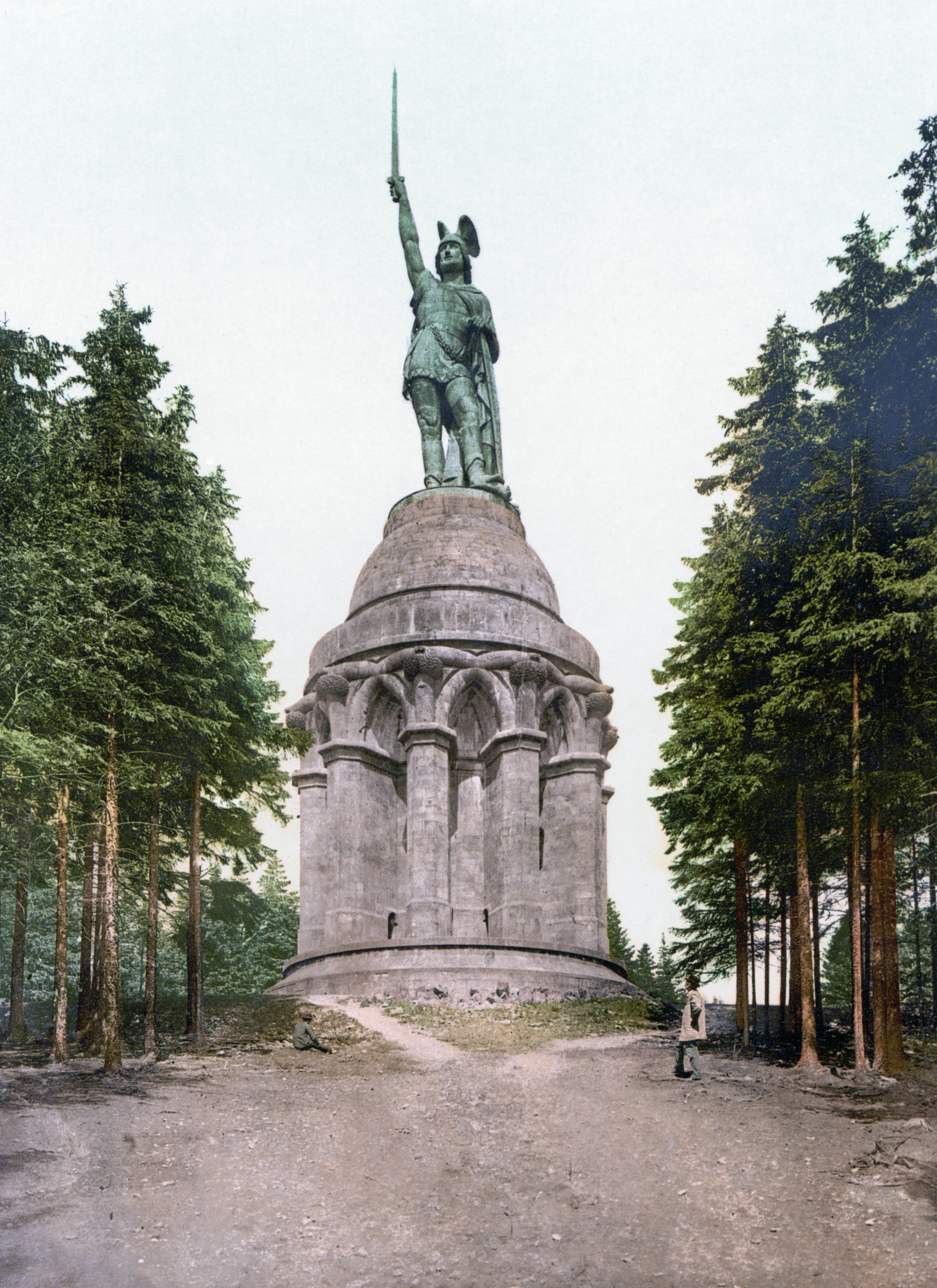
The Hermannsdenkmal circa 1900

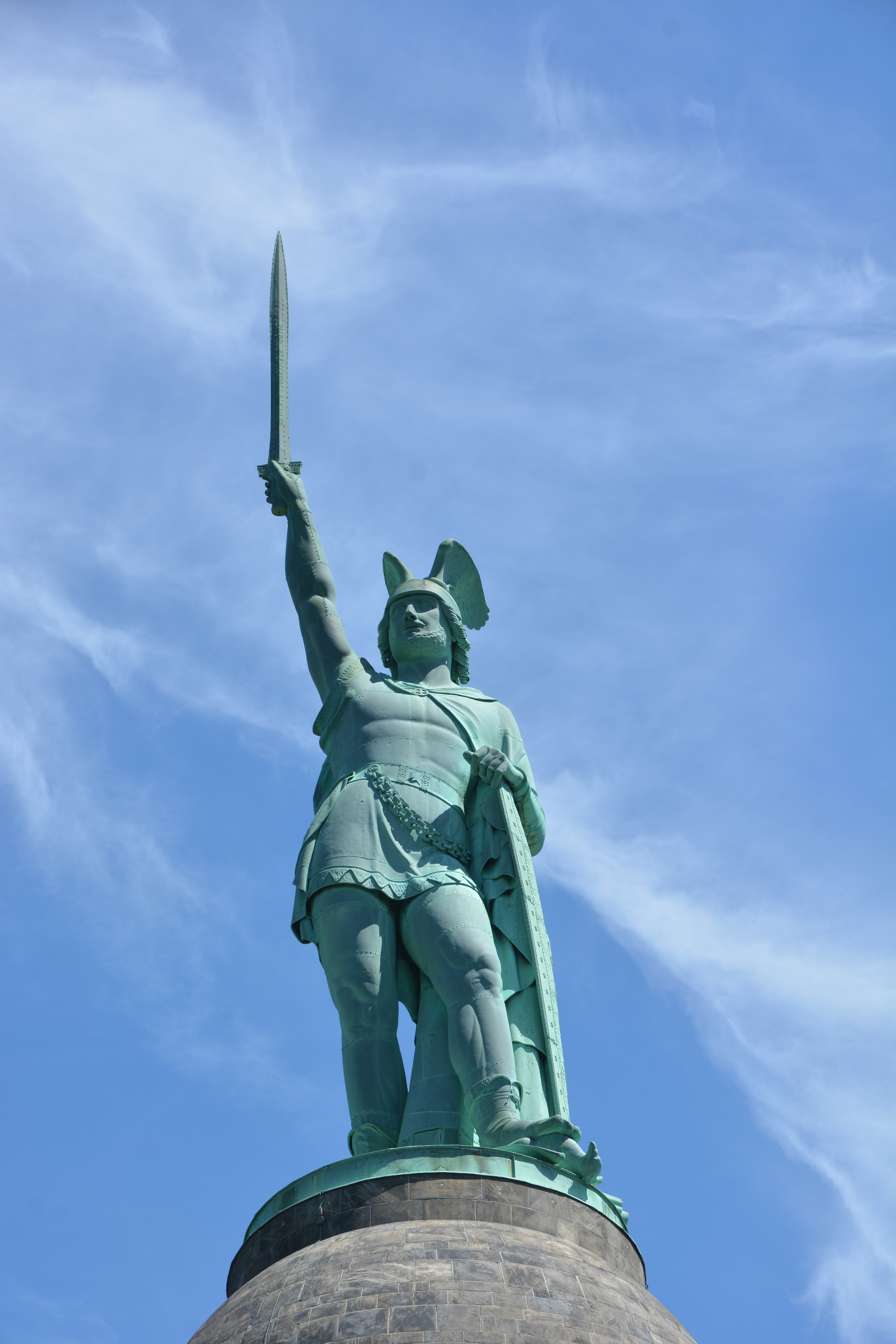
The statue up close. The sword has a length of 7 meters and weighs ca. 550 kg

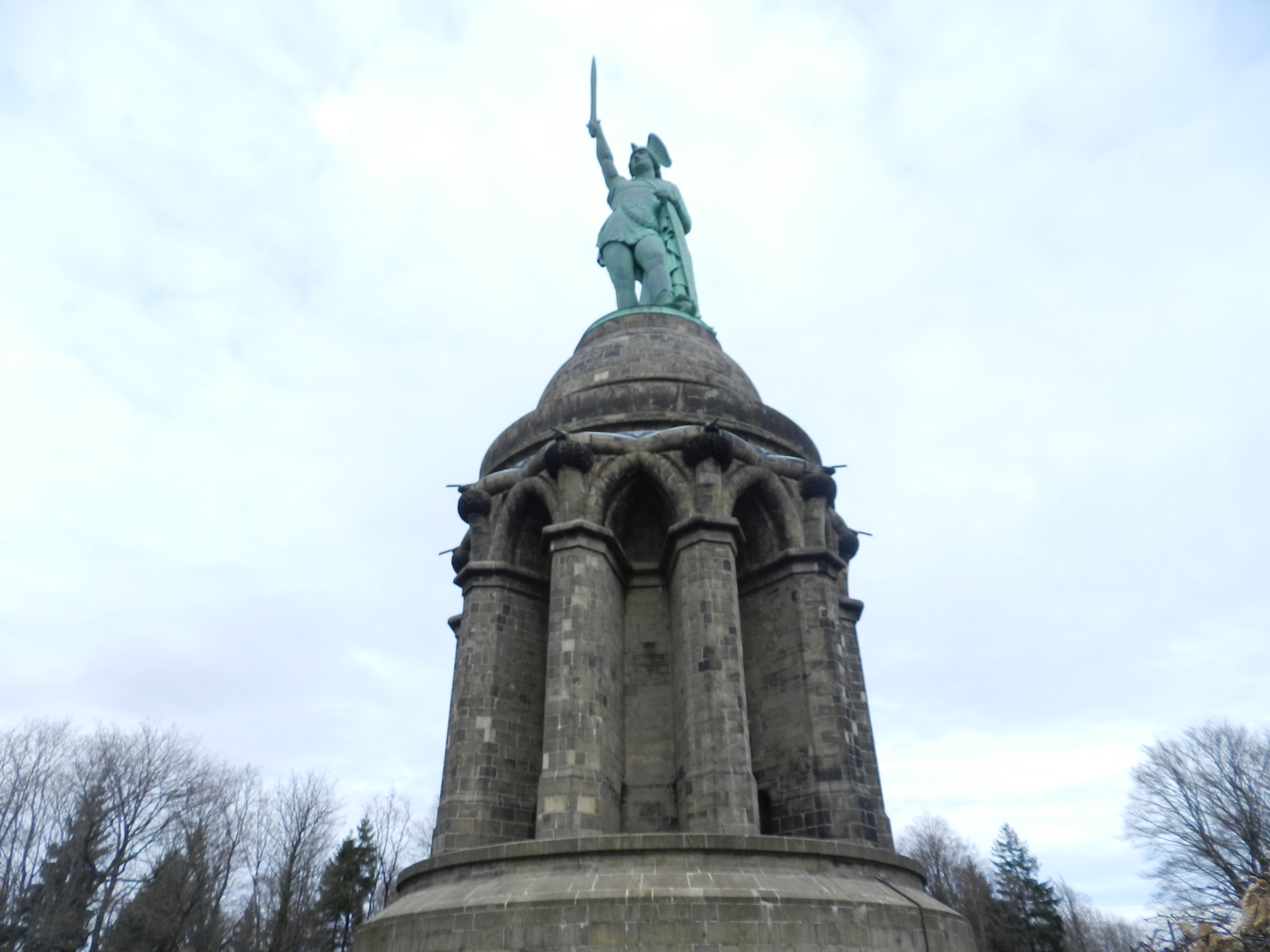
Hermann monument in Detmold, North Rhine-Westphalia

=== Construction ===
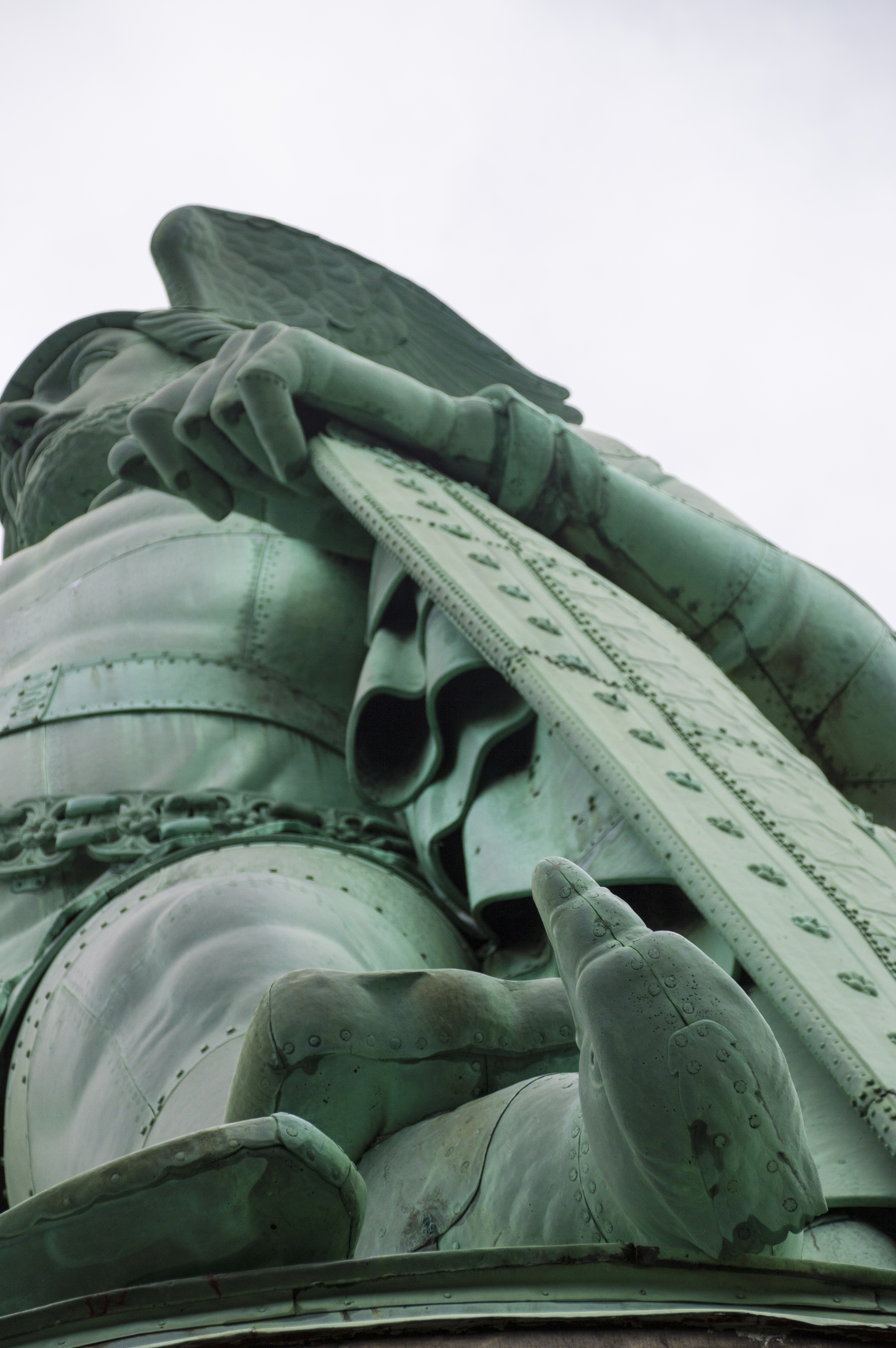
Hermannsdenkmal in 2016

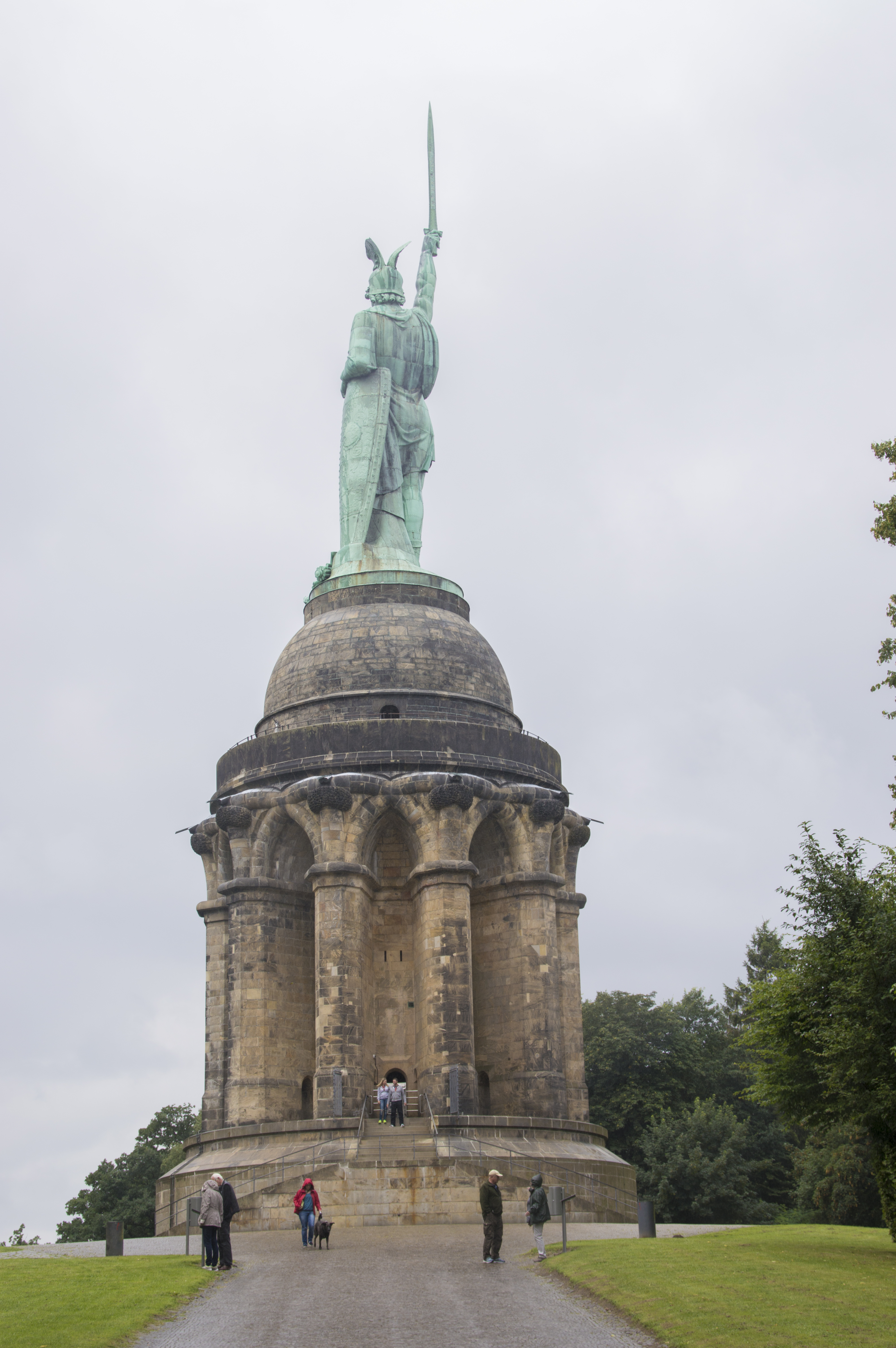
Hermannsdenkmal in 2016 from the back

Against this backdrop Ernst von Bandel came to the Teutoburg Forest in 1836 to put into action his life's dream of erecting a monument to Arminius. He considered building it near the Externsteine, but eventually settled on the Grotenburg, locally also sometimes referred to as Teutburg or Teutoburg. In 1837, an association called Verein für das Hermannsdenkmal was established at Detmold with the goal of funding the project, so Bandel could focus on the work of designing rather than on fundraising. Similar organisations were founded in other parts of Germany and donations started to come in. That same year, Prince Leopold II gave his permission to build the monument, but only for the Grotenburg location, thereby settling the issue. He also provided the property rights for the project. The local residents agreed to forfeit their wood pasture rights on the peak. Bandel's family moved to Detmold.

In 1838, Bandel changed his original draft idea for the figure of 1834 to take into account that a pedestal would be needed in this location, to make the statue visible from afar. Earthworks began in July 1838, and the foundation stone was laid in October 1838. Bandel then traveled to Italy and met King Ludwig I of Bavaria en route, who promised him financial support but also asked for a design change. Thus the rock that was supposed to cap the temple and serve as the base for the figure was to be replaced by a dome surrounded by a gallery. Bandel included this in his final draft of 1840.

Problems emerged as Bandel's designs were subject to criticism and the financial viability of the project came to be questioned. Thus, in 1839, Karl Friedrich Schinkel and Christian Daniel Rauch presented an alternative design. The Prussian king preferred Bandel's more martial design. Yet despite an ample flow of donations, financial difficulties continued. An initial celebration on occasion of the finished base vault on 8 September 1841 already gave rise to some fervent anti-French rhetoric. In 1844, the pedestal was completed, but it had overshot cost estimates by 4,000 thaler. This caused a rift between the Verein and Bandel, who moved back to Hanover in 1846.

After the German revolution of 1848 failed to create a unified German state, the flow of donations for the monument became a trickle and work ceased. Bandel now used his private wealth to continue the work. By 1860, the design for the statue's internal iron frame had been created. A supportive Verein was founded in Hanover. From 1862, Bandel worked on the copper plates at a workshop in Hanover. In 1866, Prussia defeated Austria and German nationalism once again was on the rise. It became more associated with authoritarianism than with the liberal ideas of 1848 and also more anti-French. That year, Prussia annexed the Kingdom of Hanover and its king once again took an interest in the project. In 1869, William I of Prussia visited Bandel's workshop.

After the German victory over the French in the Franco-Prussian War and the creation of the new German Empire, Bandel's Arminius monument perfectly captured the mood of the times and work advanced rapidly. The new Reichstag allocated 10,000 thaler. From August 1871, Bandel once again worked on the site and in 1872 moved there with his wife. In September 1873, the workshop in Hanover was closed and the finishing touch to the monument (the attaching of the Emperor William relief) was applied in July 1875. The monument was inaugurated on 16 August 1875, in the presence of Emperor William I and the crown prince, Frederick William, which made this an event of national importance. Around 20,000 to 30,000 people participated in the festivities.

Although it was "given" to the German people in that ceremony, the Verein remained the legal owner of the monument. The Verein was dissolved in 1881 and transferred responsibility for it to the government of the Principality of Lippe. After a long legal process, ownership passed to the foundation Hermannsdenkmal-Stiftung in 1928, which remains the caretaker today. After 1945, the foundation was linked closely to the Landesverband Lippe.

=== Later reception ===
From its inauguration, the monument served as a memorial for the war against and victory over France. At the same time, Prussia and Germany were in the middle of Kulturkampf, a fight against the power of the Roman Catholic Church, thus Arminius became a convenient symbol of "another victory over Rome".

In the Empire, the Hermannsdenkmal was indeed treated as a national monument, but it remained controversial. At first it was Catholics, but later social democrats, unionists and communists who failed to identify with the monument. Until 1909 no large-scale events took place there, but the location was used for numerous private occasions in memory of the 1870/71 war. In 1881, Detmold was connected to the railway and tourists started to arrive, initially numbering just a few hundred per year, but by 1895 there were 20,500 visitors. In 1909, the 1900th anniversary of Arminius' battle was celebrated with a multi-day event (14 to 23 August), involving parades, costumes and re-enactments of the battle. Around 30,000 people attended the celebration on 15 August at the Grotenburg. Historian Hans Delbrück gave the keynote speech and the newly built Bandel Bench (financed by individual donations) was inaugurated. Missing from the scene was the Kaiser, however. Due to a past argument over the succession in the Principality of Lippe, the current Prince, Leopold IV had asked for the Emperor to be omitted from the list of guests. The day ended with an outdoor staging of a new play by August Weweler, Hermann der Cherusker. This started an annual tradition of such theatrical events, known as the Hünenring-Festspiele after the setting, the Kleiner Hünenring. It was to last until the end of the Empire in 1918.

During World War I the monument became an instrument of military propaganda, which implied that the current war would end with a German victory like the battle fought by Arminius or the war of 1870/71. In 1915, the number of annual visitors exceeded 50,000 for the first time.

In the Weimar Republic the monument became a popular meeting point for associations and societies of the nationalist, monarchist and reactionary right whilst the government kept its distance. The 50th anniversary of the statue's inauguration from 1 to 19 August 1925 thus was an event dominated by the political right. On 8/9 August, around 50,000 visitors attended a procession. Another highlight was a long-distance relay race called Hermannslauf beginning at 16 different points all over Germany (such as Kulm, the Zugspitze or Flensburg) and in which 120,000 runners participated. The final runners arrived at the Grotenburg on 16 August. The keynote speech of the celebration on 9 August was given by the head of the right-wing Der Stahlhelm, and other nationalist groups such as the Jungdeutscher Orden were also prominent. Tourism flourished in the Weimar years: 1920 96,000 people climbed the monument, by 1925 that number had increased to 120,000.

Adolf Hitler visited the monument in 1926 and after 1930 the Lippe NSDAP used the location for a number of assemblies. After the Hitler's seizure of power in 1933, the Detmold government tried to have the Hermannsdenkmal declared the official Wallfahrtstätte der deutschen Nation (pilgrimage site of the German nation) but was turned down by the Nazi government in Berlin. The Nazi leadership preferred to organise events at locations of its own choosing, with better transport facilities. The monument featured as a symbol in Nazi propaganda material, but as a place for assemblies it was mostly used only by the Hitlerjugend and local branches of the various Nazi organisations. In 1936, the monument had 191,000 visitors. Events in 1935 (the monument's 60th anniversary) and 1941 (100 years since the foundation stone was laid) were smaller than the 1909 and 1925 celebrations and focused on glorifying Hitler and glamorizing him as the successor of Arminius.

Post-1945, attempts were made to de-politicise the monument. The 75th anniversary celebrations in 1950 were relatively low key, even though they lasted longer than any previous ones, from 6 July to 20 August. They mostly served to promote the region as a tourist destination. Annual visitor number rose to 400,000 in the 1960s and 1970s, but the focus shifted towards the view and the monument as a purely touristic sight, while the political connotations were pushed into the background. Events in 1975 and 2000 (100th and 125th anniversary) for the first time included critical debate of the 19th-century views of Arminius and the role of the monument in shaping the public's reception of the Germanic past.

== Description ==
=== Location ===
The monument stands on the peak of the wooded hill known as Grotenburg, 386 m above NHN. The hill is part of the Teutoburg Forest. It is located south of the Stadtteil Hiddesen of Detmold. To the southwest lies the Sennelager Training Area. The monument is also a point on the Hermannsweg, a long-distance hiking trail.

=== Overall dimensions and materials ===
The monument rises a total of 53.44 m. The statue accounts for 24.82 m (including the sword). Pedestal and base of the statue make up the difference. The statue was made from around 200 copper plates riveted together and supported by an iron frame. The copper weighs an estimated 11.8 metric tons. The pedestal is made of local sandstone, quarried on the hill nearby.

=== Statue ===
The statue faces west. This reflects the idea that Varus' troops were coming from this direction. It is also intended to confront France, considered to be the Erbfeind (sworn enemy) of Germany in the 19th century. The subject wears clothes deemed historically accurate at the time and has a body shape which the designer considered to be "typically Germanic". The right arm holds the sword pointing upward. The left is supported by a large shield. The statue's left foot rests on a Roman Eagle, the standard of the Roman Legions. Next to it lies a fasces, the symbol of Roman judicial authority.

The figure's position is known as contrapposto, with most of its weight on one foot so that its shoulders and arms twist off-axis from the hips and legs. Arminius is shown wearing trousers, a short skirt reaching to the upper thighs, a tabard held closed by a fibula and boots. On the bearded head with short curly hair sits a winged helm. Bandel knew that Germanic tribes did not use winged helmets but wanted to show the eagle as a heraldic symbol of Germany.

The sword has the following inscription in gold letters:

DEUTSCHE : EINIGKEIT : MEINE : STAERKE
MEINE : STAERKE : DEUTSCHLANDS : MACHT
German unity (is) my strength – my strength (is) Germany's might.

On the shield is written Treufest (roughly "always faithful").

=== Pedestal ===
The pedestal is shaped like a monopteros, a Classical round temple. This is surrounded by ten columns, supporting Gothic arches. At the time of construction, the Gothic style (which actually originated in France) was deemed a "true German" style. Inside the pedestal is a spiral staircase of 75 steps leading up to a round platform encircling the dome on which stands the statue.

Three of the niches created by the columns contain inscriptions:

The first shows a Latin quotation from Tacitus' Annals, describing Arminius as the liberator of Germany (Germaniae).

The second refers to the Befreiungskriege against Napoleon. It blames the prior defeats in the Napoleonic Wars on the help France received from some German states and celebrates Prussia as the leader and liberator of Germany. It also gives the dates of the Battle of Leipzig, the Treaty of Paris, the Battle of Waterloo and the Battle of Issy (i.e. the fall of Paris in 1815).

The third niche contains a relief of Emperor William I, celebrating his victory over France in the Franco-Prussian War of 1870/71 and his role as unifier of Germany as the first Emperor of the German Empire. He is explicitly equated with Arminius in the inscription. Underneath, an inscription states that Napoleon III declared war on Prussia in July 1870, which resulted in "utter defeat" for France at the hand of the combined German states and the establishment of the Unification of Germany.

=== Stairway and Bandel Bench ===
These structures were added in 1908/09, based on an overall design by architect Wilhelm Kreis. The stairs lead up from a small landing to the statue from the front. The landing ends at the Bandel Bench, a semi-circular stone bench decorated with carvings of trophies taken from the Romans by the victorious Germans (designed by sculptor Wilhelm Albermann). In its centre sits a copper monument commemorating Bandel, designed by Rudolph Hölbe.

== Other nearby structures ==
Near the monument stands the Bandelhütte, the historic hut where Bandel lived during the final years of construction (1872–75). Today, it features a small exhibition on the monument. A bit further away is the Bismarckstein monument, dedicated to Otto von Bismarck in 1895.

== Grotenburg ==
The hill also features two circular ramparts. One, around 300 m from the monument, is known as the Kleiner Hünenring. The other, larger one, surrounds the monument and is known as Grotenburg or Großer Hünenring.

The latter had a total size of around 11 hectares. It likely was one of a number of similar structures built and used from the 3rd to 1st century BC by local tribes at the northern edges of the German Mittelgebirge, apparently inspired by Celtic hilltop settlements further south. The Grotenburg walls probably were of a type made up of earth and supported by timber, but not much is known about their construction. Almost nothing of the structure remains visible today, as the terrain has been altered by the building of the monument, the parking area and other touristic infrastructure. No archaeological findings have been made, with the exception of a possible Iron Age (Roman) spear head.

== Hermann Monument in New Ulm ==
A similar Hermann Monument was built in the 1890s in New Ulm, Minnesota, a town settled by German immigrants.

== Today ==
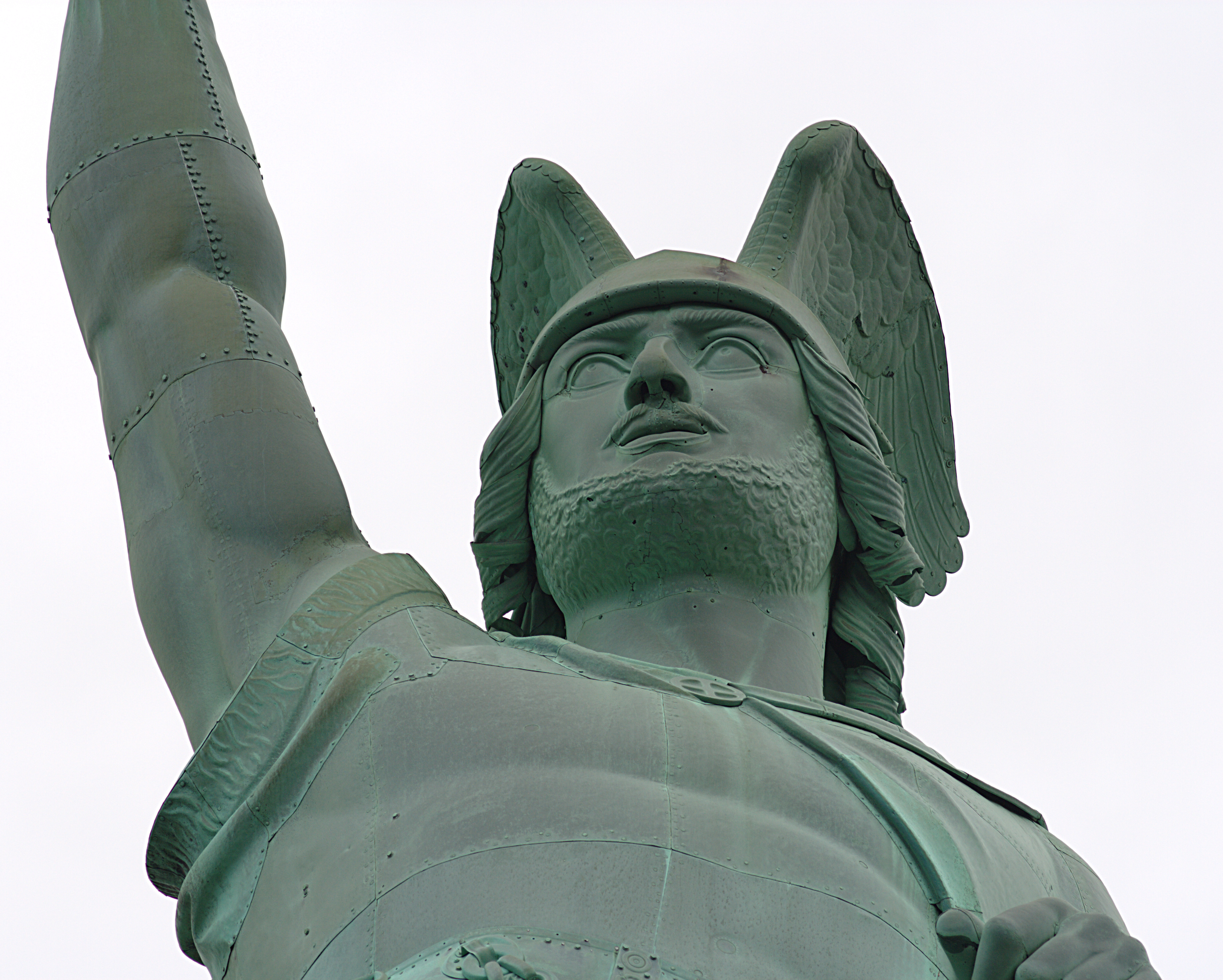
Detailed view of the statue: recognizable are the riveted copper-plates.

The statue is one of the most popular tourist destinations in Germany with over 530,000 visitors a year. The statue's base may be climbed, affording wide landscape views over the surrounding tree cover.

Since 1972, a new form of the Hermannslauf starts at the monument every April. A long-distance signed hiking trail known as Hermannsweg leads past the monument. Since 2008, the Hermannsdenkmal has been a part of the signed tourist road Straße der Monumente.

During thunderstorms the prominence of the statue causes it to be frequently struck by lightning. The Blitzortung network of lightning detectors recorded 234 strikes per year on or near the statue.

The term "Herman the German" is also commonly used by English speakers as an affectionate name for the Hermannsdenkmal – and also as a jocular term for (male) Germans in general.

== See also ==
- Befreiungshalle (Kelheim, Germany)
- Heldenberg Memorial (Austria)
- List of Germania statues
- List of tallest statues
- Niederwalddenkmal (Rüdesheim, Germany)
- Ruhmeshalle (Munich, Germany)
- Vercingétorix monument (France)
- Walhalla temple (Regensburg, Germany)

== Bibliography ==
- Andreas Dörner: Politischer Mythos und Symbolische Politik. Sinnstiftung durch Symbolische Formen. Opladen 1995, ISBN 3-531-12697-0.
- Günter Engelbert (ed.): Ein Jahrhundert Hermannsdenkmal 1875–1975. Detmold 1975.
- Roswitha Kaiser: Hermann: Denkmal, Pflege und Inszenierung. (PDF; 1,4 MB) In: Denkmalpflege in Westfalen-Lippe. 01/07. LWL, Ardey, Münster, 2007. ISSN 0947-8299, pp. 13–18
- Stephanie Lux-Althoff (ed.): 125 Jahre Hermannsdenkmal: Nationaldenkmale im historischen und politischen Kontext. Lemgo 2001, ISBN 3-9807375-1-9.
- Burkhard Meier: Das Hermannsdenkmal und Ernst von Bandel. Detmold 2000, ISBN 3-9806101-7-9.
- Dirk Mellies: „Wir kämpfen unter Hermanns Zeichen bis alle unsere Feinde bleichen“. Die politische Rezeption des Hermannsdenkmals 1914–1933. in: Hermann Niebuhr und Andreas Ruppert (ed.): Krieg – Revolution – Republik. Detmold 1914–1933: Dokumentation eines stadtgeschichtlichen Projekts. Bielefeld 2006, pp. 335–373, ISBN 3-89528-606-0.
- Thomas Nipperdey: Nationalidee und Nationaldenkmal in Deutschland im 19. Jahrhundert. in: Historische Zeitschrift 206 (1968), pp. 529–585.
- Georg Nockemann: Hermannsdenkmal. (Lippische Sehenswürdigkeiten, Heft 3). 2. edition, Lemgo 1984.
- Imke Ritzmann: Ideengeschichtliche Aspekte des Hermannsdenkmals bei Detmold. in: Lippische Mitteilungen 75 (2006), pp. 193–229.
- Hans Schmidt: Das Hermannsdenkmal im Spiegel der Welt. Detmold 1975.
- Charlotte Tacke: Denkmal im sozialen Raum. Nationale Symbole in Deutschland und Frankreich im 19. Jhdt.: Göttingen 1995, ISBN 3-525-35771-0.
- Michael Zelle: Das Hermannsdenkmal (Lippische Kulturlandschaften, Heft 25). Detmold 2014
