= Parlier =

Parlier may refer to:

- Parlier, California, city in Fresno County, California
- Charles Jules Parlier (1827—1888), French general officer
- Eugène Parlier (1929–2017), Swiss football goalkeeper
- Yves Parlier (born 1960), French sailor
- Heinrich the Parlier (died 1403), German stone mason and architect, see Heinrich Beheim
