= Ernst von Bandel =

German sculptor

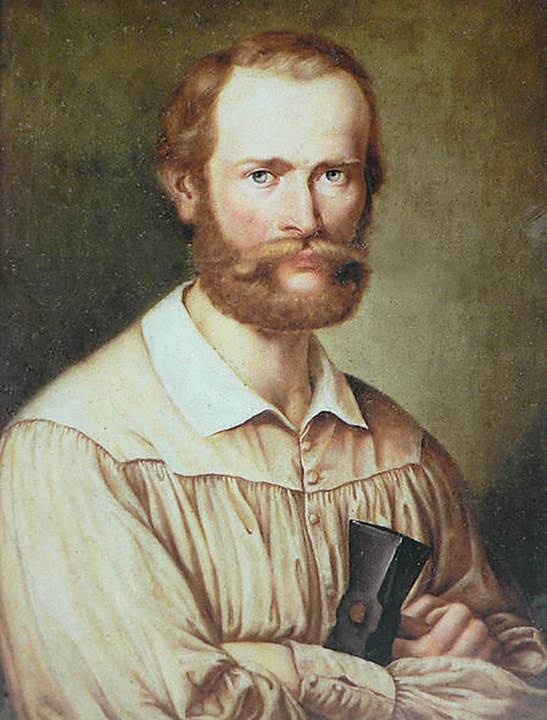
- Ernst von Bandel by Wilhelm Tegeler, c. 1843
- Born: 17 May 1800; Ansbach, Holy Roman Empire
- Died: 25 September 1876 (aged 76); Neudegg, German Empire
- Occupations: sculptor, architect, painter
- Notable work: Hermannsdenkmal

Joseph Ernst von Bandel (17 May 1800, Ansbach – 25 September 1876, Neudegg, near Donauwörth) was a German architect, sculptor and painter. He is best known for his 37 years of work on the monumental Hermannsdenkmal near Detmold, honoring Arminius' victory over Roman troops in 9 AD.

== Early life ==
Ernst Bandel was born on 17 May 1800 at Ansbach. His father, Georg Carl von Bandel, was a Prussian civil servant (Regierungsdirektor). His childhood was dominated by political events (the French occupation in 1805; the 1813 War of Liberation) which left him a lifelong patriot. After Ansbach became Bavarian in 1806, Ernst's father worked for the new government and became the president of the local appellate court. In 1813, he became a noble. At fourteen, Ernst von Bandel began to take drawing lessons at the Academy of Fine Arts, Nuremberg, with the engraver Albert Christoph Reindel. Two years later, he went to Munich to apply for a position with the Royal Bavarian Forestry Office. While there, he met the architect Karl von Fischer and became his student.

His father's death in 1818 and the resulting financial stress almost forced him to give up his interest in art, but through his father's connections with the royal family, he was able to arrange a generous grant from King Maximilian I. The following year, he was given a job as a draftsman at the Hofbauamt (the office responsible for the construction and maintenance of the royal buildings).

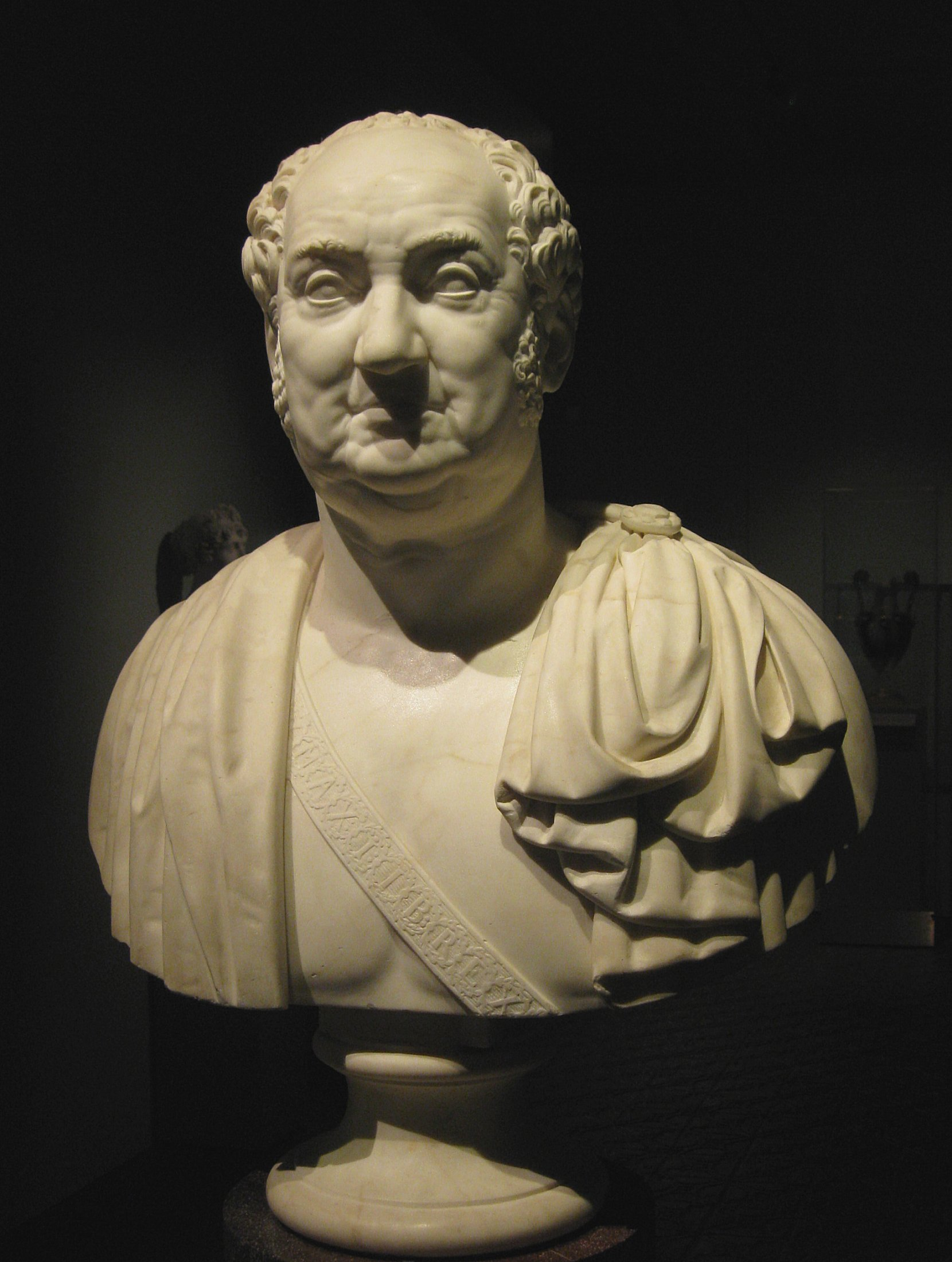
Bust of King Maximilian I (1826)

== Career as an artist ==
In 1820, he refused a job offer as an assistant to the architect Leo von Klenze, as he was not amenable to Bandel's preference for the Gothic style. Later that year, he entered the Academy of Fine Arts, Munich, first as a painter but soon switched to sculpting. There, he studied under Moritz Kellerhoven, Wilhelm von Kobell and others. In 1819/20, he first worked on drafts for a statue of Arminius.

In 1822/23, Bandel was at Nuremberg, working on completing the figures on the Gothic Schöner Brunnen While there, he met Karoline von Kohlhagen, whom he married in 1827. They were to have a total of seven children (five sons, two daughters).

With a final stipendium from the king, he was able to study and work in Italy from 1825 to 1827. While in Rome he met Bertel Thorvaldsen and several members of the Nazarene movement, but was unimpressed by them. His closest associates were Ludwig Schwanthaler and Heinrich Max Imhof. He worked as a sculptor in Rome. After his return to Germany, he made the figurine on the gable of the Staatliche Antikensammlungen, following a design by his teacher Johann Nepomuk Haller. He also found employment with Christian Daniel Rauch at the Glyptothek, where he remained until 1834. In 1832, he and Hans Ferdinand Massmann founded the local Gymnastics Society.

Maximilian's successor, Ludwig I, asked Leo von Klenze to design the Walhalla memorial near Regensburg between 1830 and 1842. Bandel contributed to the work and made the statue of Franz von Sickingen. However, he felt the Neoclassical design to be alien to Germany and thus inappropriate for a national memorial. Bandel also had personal problems with some of his colleagues and the king.

Bandel found himself receiving little support or understanding from the new king, so he moved to Berlin in 1834, following his former employer, Rauch, who was working on a huge equestrian statue of Frederick the Great. He soon began making his own proposals for a grand national monument, but got little encouragement and less interest, so he moved, this time to Hanover where, with the intercession of architect Ernst Ebeling, King William IV entrusted him with the design of the residential palace. Bandel contributed to the interior design of the palace and the Schlosskirche (chapel). He also worked on the new auditorium at Georg August University in Göttingen, creating the pediment reliefs and a statue of William IV in front of the building.

== The Hermannsdenkmal ==
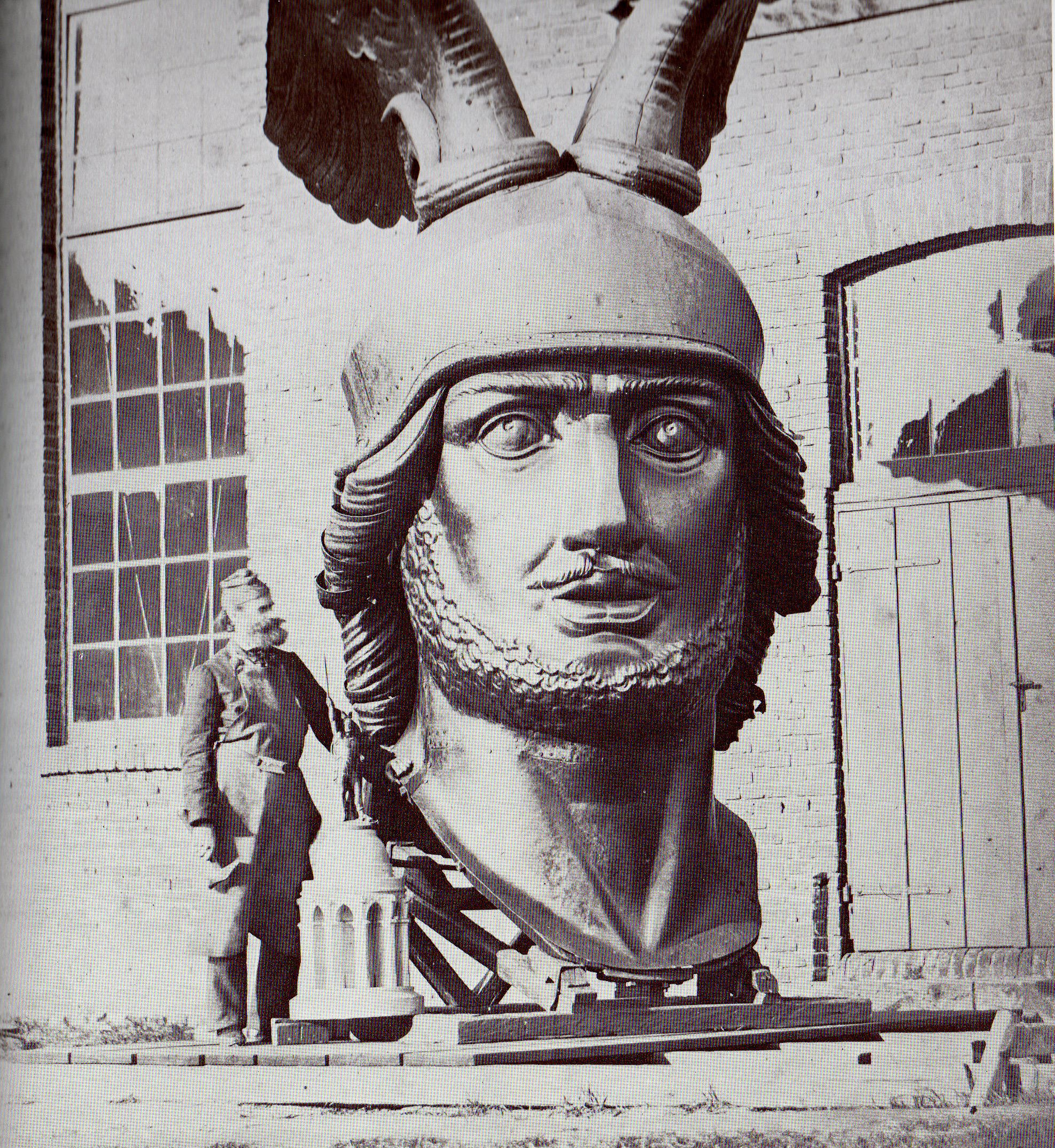
Bandel with Hermann's head (1872). Photograph by Wilhelm August Degèle

From 1837 to 1846, he lived in Detmold, working on the Hermannsdenkmal, which had been a lifelong dream of Bandel's. It commemorates a victory over three Roman Legions by the Cheruscian prince, Arminius (Hermann, in German), in 9 AD.

In 1838, Bandel again travelled to Italy, meeting Ludwig I en route, who offered financial support to the Hermannsdenkmal, but requested some changes. At Carrara, Bandel worked on a statue of Thusnelda, wife of Arminius, eventually sold to the Prince of Lippe. Another trip to Italy followed in 1843/44.

After a great deal of initial support for the project, public interest began to wane and donations decreased dramatically. Bandel had to use up his entire personal fortune in an effort to complete the monument. In 1846, he had a falling out with the Hermannsverein (the civic association promoting the project) over financial issues. He returned to Hanover, broke and embittered, but began re-soliciting donations. After the end of the Franco-Prussian War, the government and the public found their enthusiasm for the project restored. Bandel now made the copper plates for the statue at a Hanover workshop. In 1869, Wilhelm I (William I) visited him there. From 1871, Bandel worked at Detmold again and in 1872 moved to the construction site with his wife. In 1873, the Hanover workshop was closed. The statue was finally inaugurated on 16 August 1875 by (as he now was) Kaiser William I. After the creation of the German Empire, the Reichstag and the Kaiser had provided the necessary sum for completion. Bandel took part in the ceremony, and by now had become a celebrity, showered with honors including honorary citizenship of Detmold (1871) and Ansbach (1875). William I awarded him a lifelong stipend of 4,000 thaler per year.

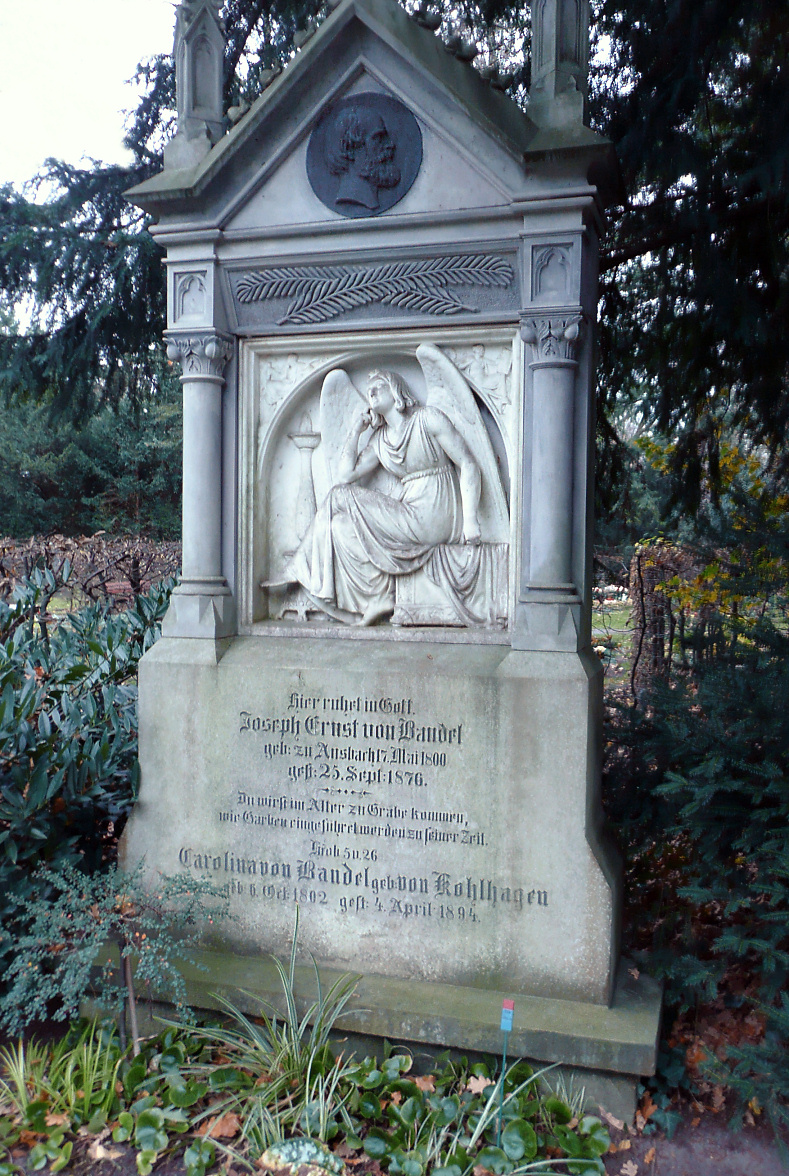
Tomb of Ernst von Bandel

However, Bandel had been weakened by the years of work on the exposed hilltop and by kidney disease. He opened a studio in Hanover and in 1876 went on another trip to Italy. He died on the return trip at his half-brother's estate at Neudegg near Donauwörth on 25 September 1876. He is buried at the Stadtfriedhof Engesohde at Hanover.
