= Zoiglhaus Brewing Company =

Brewery and restaurant in Portland, Oregon, U.S.

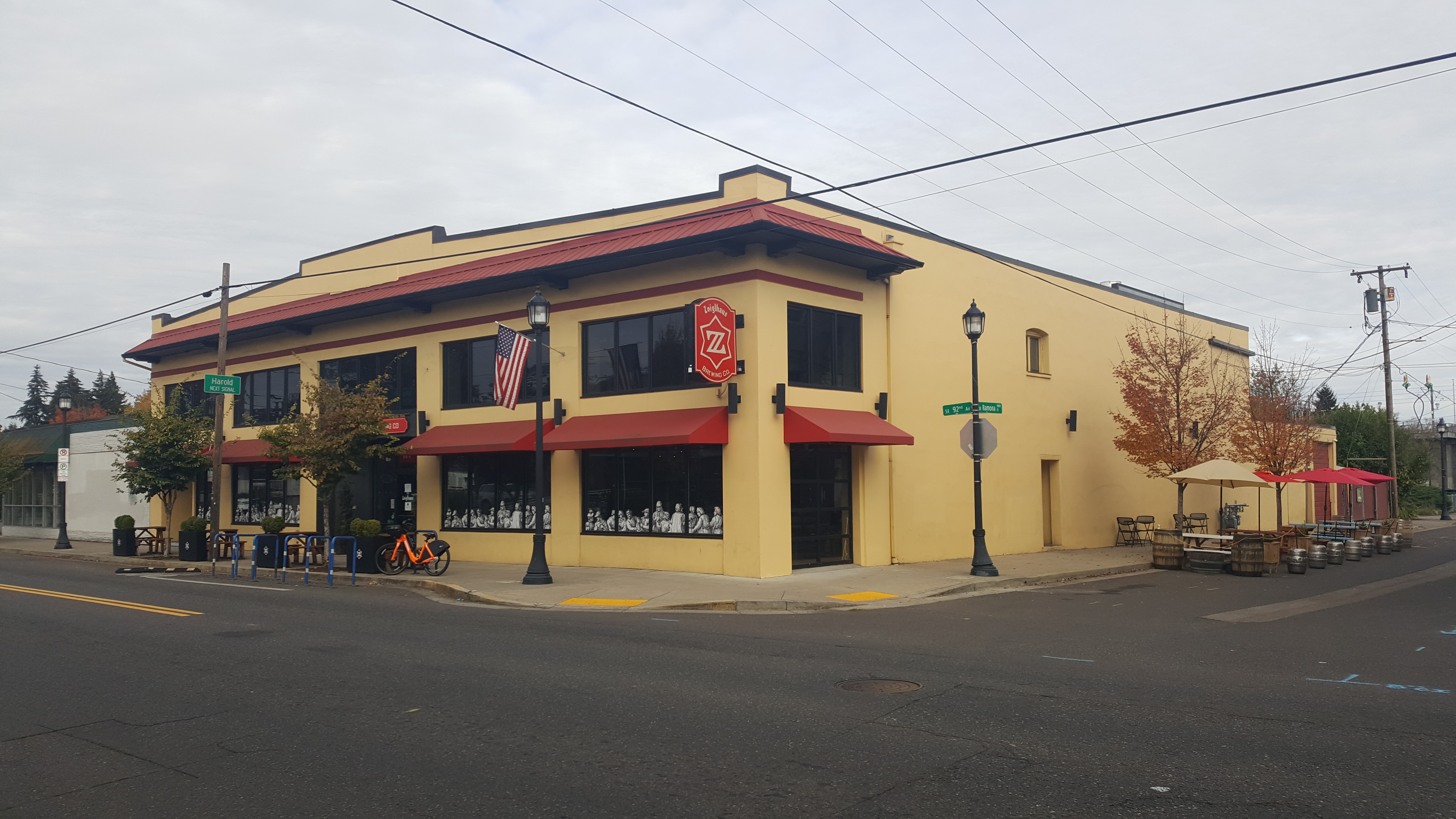
- The restaurant's exterior in 2020
- Interactive map of Zoiglhaus Brewing Company

Restaurant information
- Location: 5716 SE 92nd Avenue, Portland, Oregon, 97266, United States
- Coordinates: 45°28′51.3″N 122°34′6.5″W
- Website: zoiglhaus.com

Zoiglhaus Brewing Company (sometimes simply Zoiglhaus) is a German-style brewery and restaurant in Portland, Oregon's Lents neighborhood.

== Description and history ==
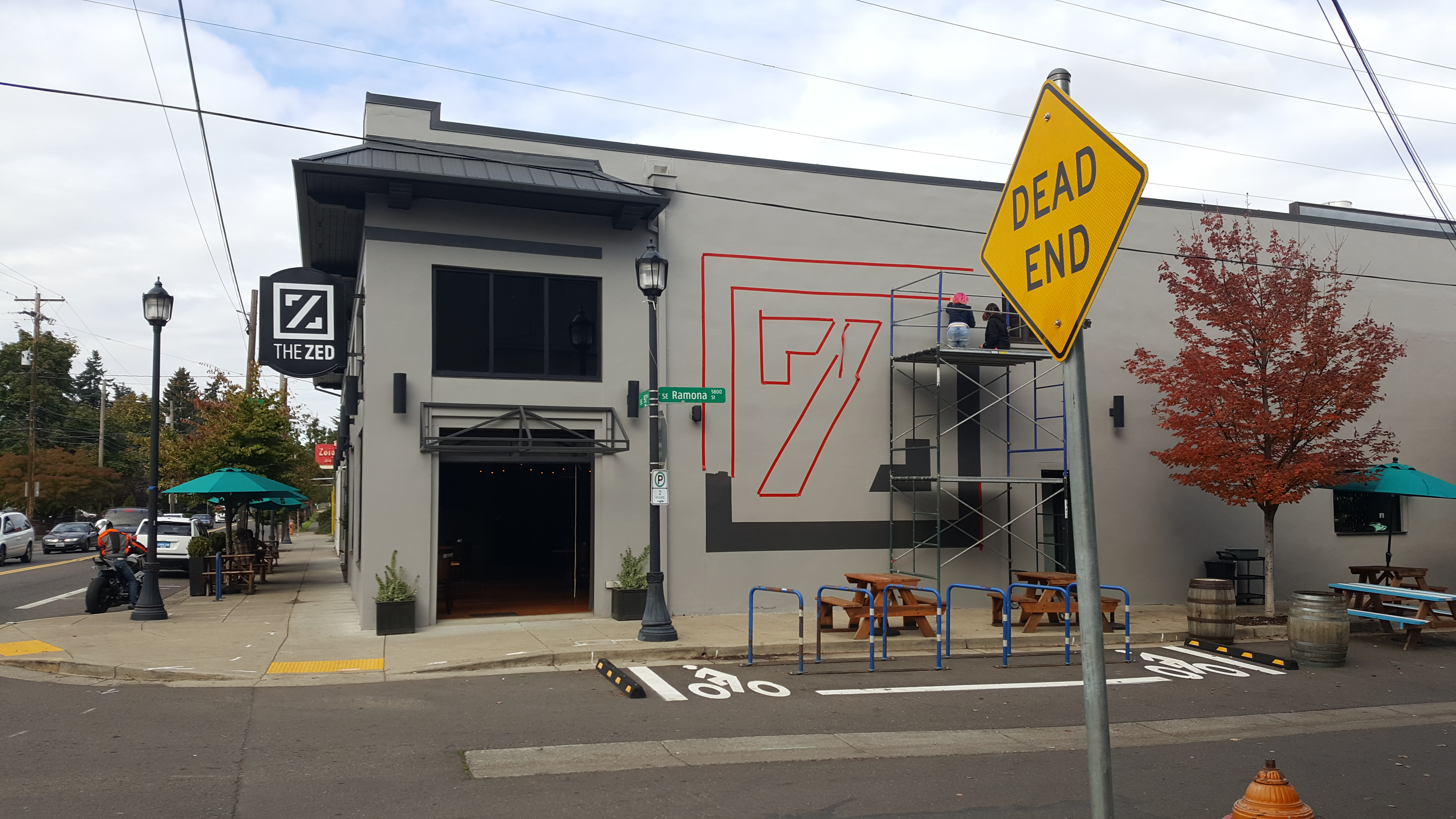
The restaurant's exterior in October 2021, during a transition to The Zed

The restaurant, established in 2015, serves German cuisine including knackwurst and sauerkraut. In 2021, the brewery began transitioning into The Zed, an expanded restaurant with a food hall, cocktail bar, and farmers market. The food hall includes Sherpa Kitchen and the cocktail bar, called Zephyr Lounge, serves a variety of drinks including a chai-infused vodka cocktail with almond milk and Kahlua.

The deaf-, Latino-, and queer-owned restaurant Pah! operated in the food hall, serving burgers, fries, and fish and chips. Michael Russell included the business in The Oregonian's list of Portland's 25 best new restaurants of 2022. Owner Lillouie Barrios closed Pah! in 2024.

The business participated in Portland's Dumpling Week in 2026.

== Reception and recognition ==
Andre Meunier ranked Zoiglhaus number 16 in The Oregonian's list of Portland's 20 best breweries for 2020. Zoiglhaus was recognized at the Oregon Beer Awards in 2021. Nathan Williams included Zoiglhaus in Eater Portland's 2022 overview of recommended eateries in the Lents neighborhood.

== See also ==
- List of German restaurants
