= Hofbräuhaus Columbus =

Brewery and restaurant in Ohio, U.S.

- Interactive map of Hofbräuhaus Columbus

Restaurant information
- Established: October 2014
- Food type: German
- Location: 800 Goodale Boulevard, Grandview Heights, Ohio
- Coordinates: 39.974507°N 83.024073°W
- Website: hofbrauhauscolumbus.com

Hofbräuhaus Columbus is a German brewery and restaurant in Grandview Heights, a suburban enclave of Columbus, Ohio.

== Description and history ==
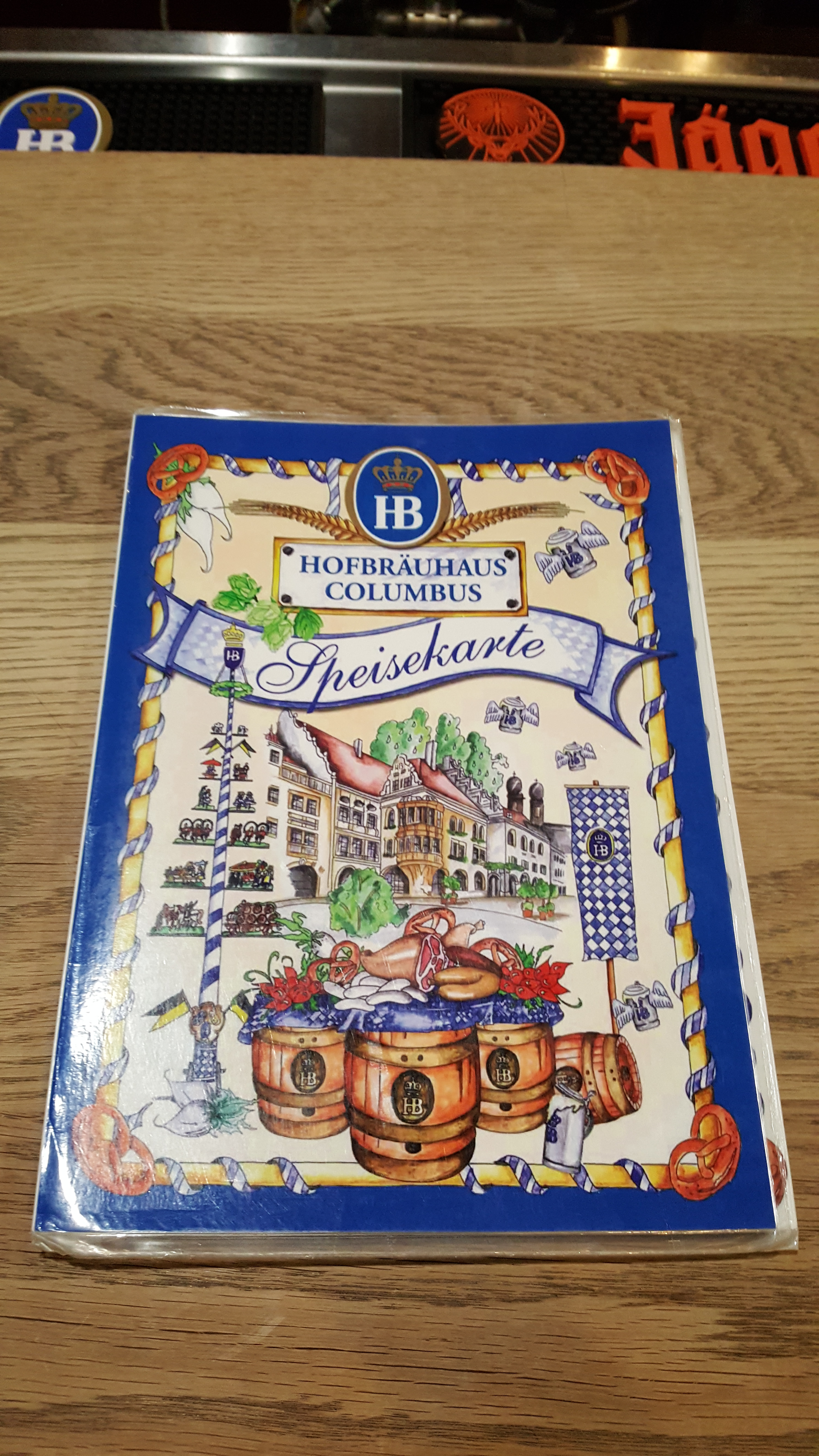
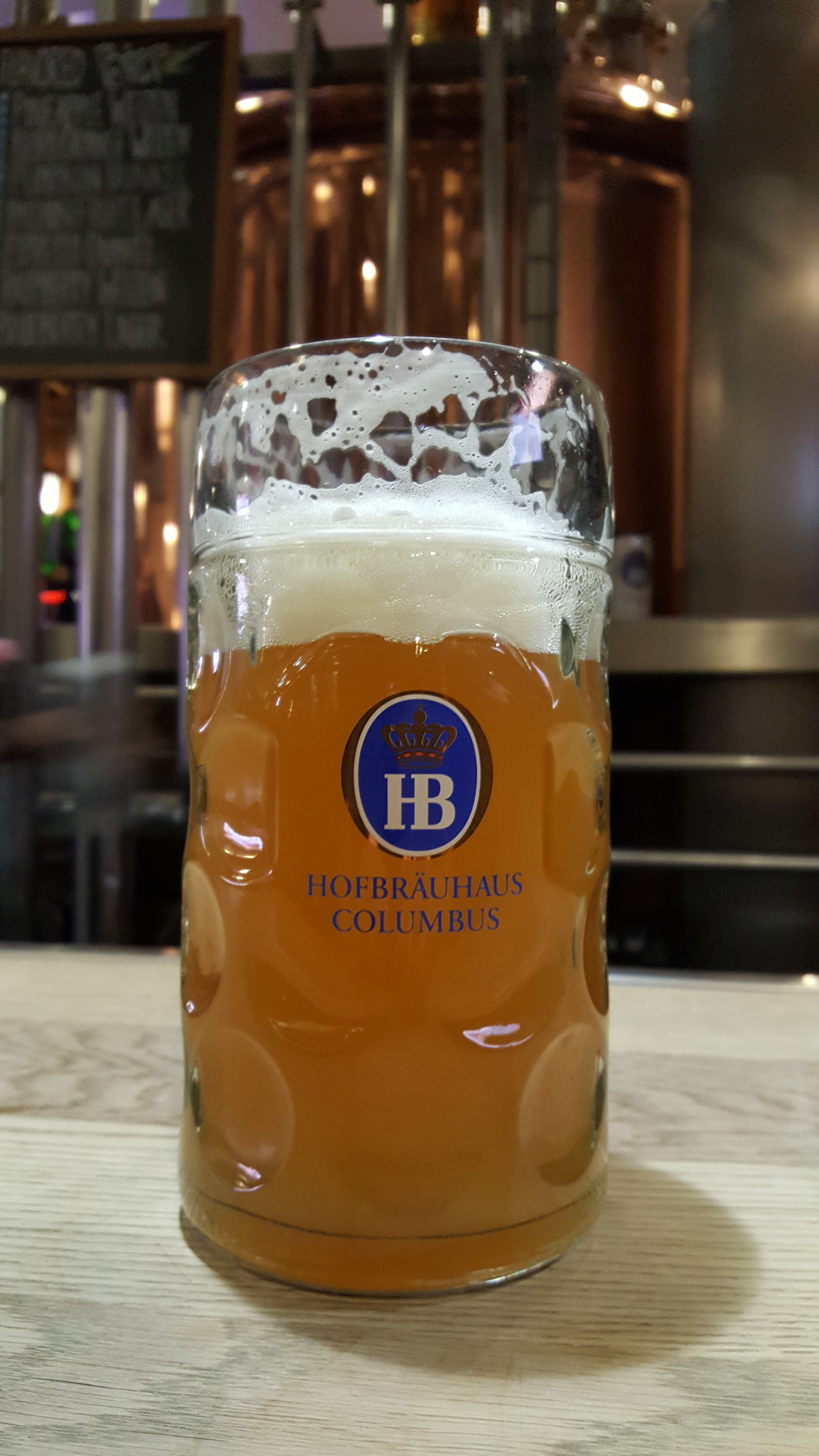
Menu (left) and glass of beer (right) in 2018

The 18,000 square foot beer hall is modeled after the Staatliches Hofbräuhaus in München, and has a patio. Hofbräuhaus Columbus opened in late October 2014.

In 2019, Columbus Monthly's Jackie Mantey wrote:

If your ideal celebration requires a bar, this sprawling spot at Grandview Yard offers an authentic German bier hall experience that’s unlike any other watering hole in town. The open floor plan, warm wooden décor, long rows of shared tables and antique metal chandeliers enhance the communal feel that hits as soon as you step in the door... Beyond the large indoor space is an outdoor biergarten, perfect for warm-weather shindigs, featuring the spot’s freshly brewed beer and menu of traditional Bavarian stars, like schnitzel and brats.

== See also ==
- List of German restaurants
