= Herman the German =

Herman the German or Hermann the German may refer to:

== People ==
- Nickname of Arminius (18/17 BC–AD 21), the chieftain who led a coalition of Germanic tribes to victory in 9 AD over a Roman army in the Battle of the Teutoburg Forest
- Hermannus Alemannus (Latin for "Herman the German"), translator of the 13th century
- Hermannus Teutonicus (Latin for "Herman the German"), Dominican writer of the 14th century
- Gerhard Neumann (1917–1997), German-American aviation engineer and executive for General Electric
- Kenny Wallace (born 1963), nickname of NASCAR driver and TV personality
- Ulf Herman (born 1966), nickname of the professional wrestler

== Arts and entertainment ==
- The statue of Arminius atop the Hermann Heights Monument in New Ulm, Minnesota, US, commonly referred to by locals as "Hermann the German"
- Herman the German, a character played by Fred Grandy in the 1975 film Death Race 2000
- Herman ze German, a 1985 album by Scorpions drummer Herman Rarebell

== Other uses ==
- Herman the German (crane vessel), a crane vessel seized from Germany by the US after World War II, later used to lift the Spruce Goose
- Herman ze German, a small German meat products fast food chain in the UK and Germany
