= Henry Thiele Restaurant =

Defunct restaurant in Portland, Oregon, US

- Interactive map of Henry Thiele Restaurant

Restaurant information
- Established: April 14, 1932
- Closed: 1990s
- Food type: German
- Location: 2315 Northwest Westover Road, Portland, Oregon, United States
- Coordinates: 45.52370°N 122.69883°W
- Seating capacity: 150

Henry Thiele Restaurant, or Henry Thiele's, was a restaurant located at 2315 Northwest Westover Road in Portland, Oregon.

== Description and history ==
Established on April 14, 1932, the restaurant was "an immediate success, offering an extensive, European-influenced menu that changed every day". According to the Oregon Encyclopedia, "Henry Thiele's was especially noted for its salmon dishes, lentils and wurst, Princess Charlotte pudding, and an enormous and puffy egg-and-lemon-and-powdered-sugar dish known as a German pancake or Dutch baby (served on a turkey platter)." Eater Portland has called the restaurant a "landmark for continental cuisine", serving German pancakes, buttered noodles with beef tips until the 1990s. The business operated in a white stucco building with a red tile roof.

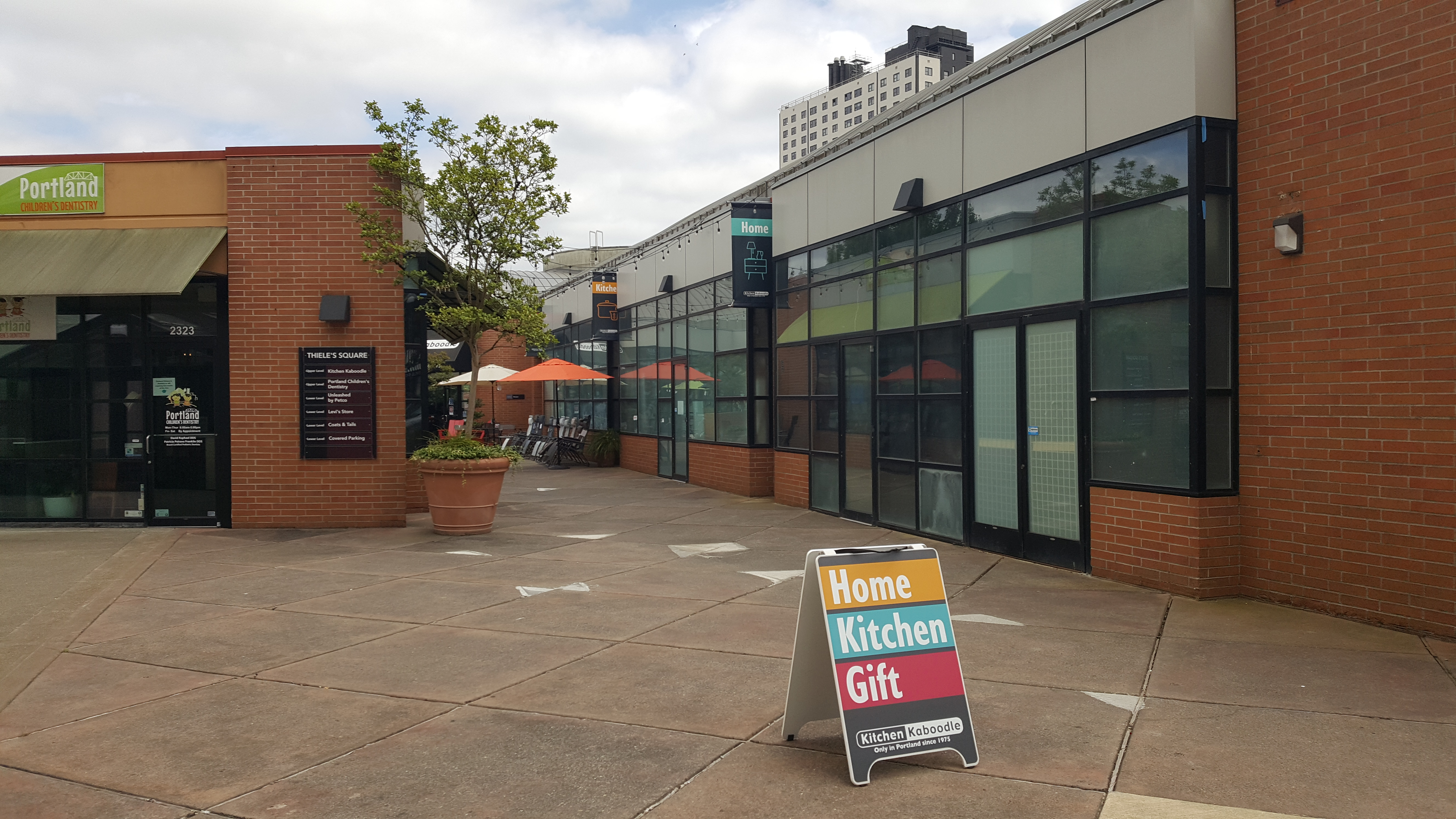
Thiele's Square, 2022

The restaurant was sold in 1990 and demolished in 1992. The shopping center Thiele Square, built in 1995, has a commemorative plaque.

== See also ==
- List of German restaurants
