= Der Rheinlander =

Defunct German restaurant in Portland, Oregon, U.S.

- Interactive map of Der Rheinlander

Restaurant information
- Established: 1963
- Food type: German
- Location: 5035 NE Sandy Blvd., Portland, Multnomah, Oregon, 97213, United States
- Coordinates: 45.539890°N 122.611224°W
- Website: rheinlander.com

Der Rheinlander was a German restaurant in Portland, Oregon's Rose City Park neighborhood, in the United States. It was established by chef Horst Mager, who is originally from Wiesbaden, Germany, in 1963. It was purchased by Venerable Properties and "under reconsideration for redevelopment" in February 2016, and closed in early 2017.

== See also ==
- List of German restaurants
