= Edelweiss Sausage & Delicatessen =

Delicatessen in Portland, Oregon, U.S.

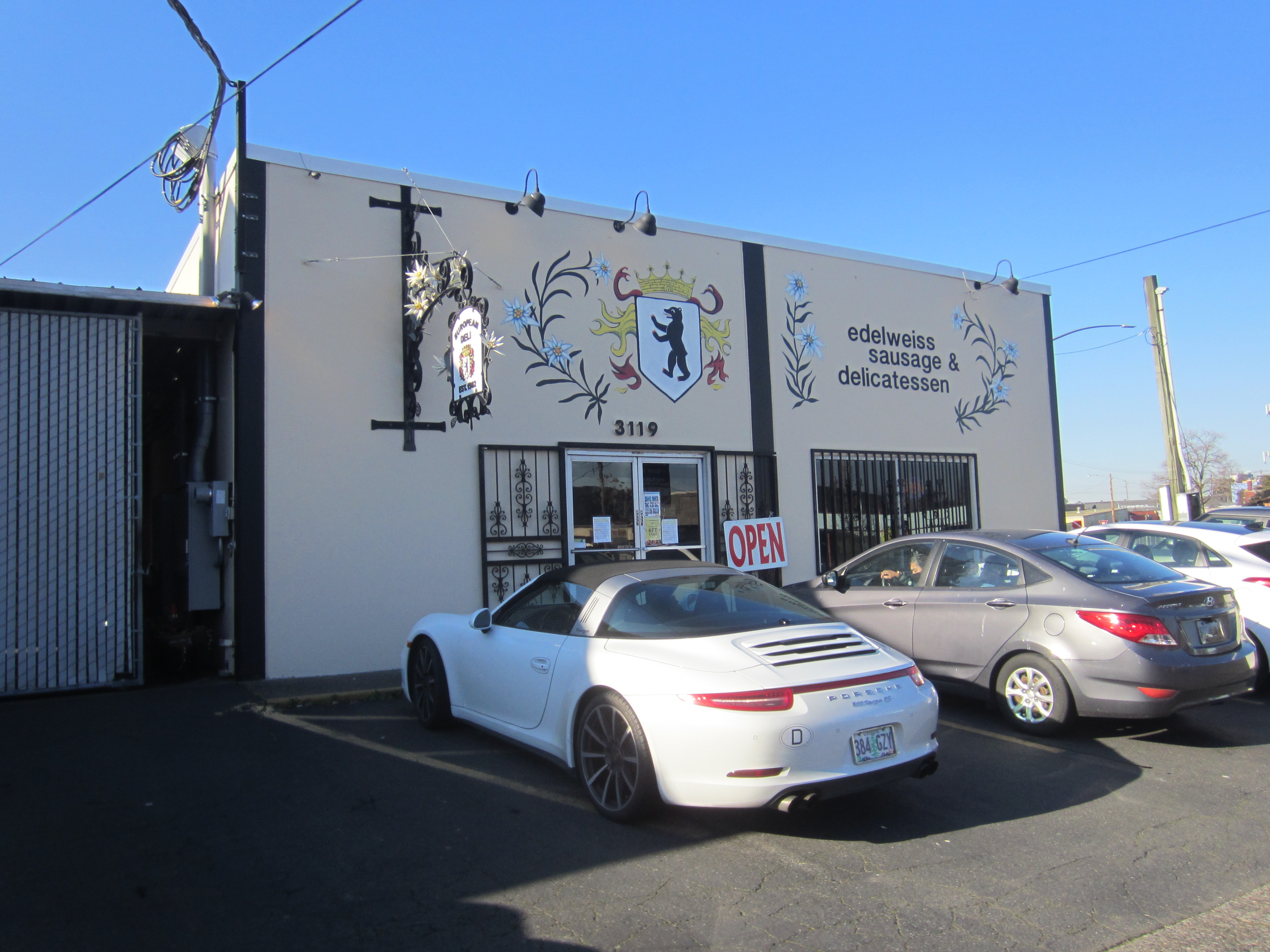
- The deli's exterior in 2021
- Interactive map of Edelweiss Sausage & Delicatessen

Restaurant information
- Location: Portland, Oregon, United States
- Coordinates: 45.5006°N 122.6534°W

Edelweiss Sausage & Delicatessen, or simply Edelweiss, is a delicatessen in southeast Portland, Oregon's Brooklyn neighborhood, in the United States.

== Description ==
In 2018, the Portland Mercury described Edelweiss as a "wünder-land of weird and delicious-looking things, from candies with unpronounceable names to mayonnaise that comes out of a toothpaste tube" with a "wraparound deli with all kinds of meats stacked high".

== History ==
Guy Fieri visited Edelweiss for an episode of the Food Network's Diners, Drive-Ins and Dives.

== Reception ==
In 2015, Willamette Week's Walker MacMurdo included Edelweiss in his overview of "The Five Best Hams Made in Portland". The newspaper's AP Kryza wrote in 2016, "At this German deli and butcher shop filled with wondrous chocolate, better beer and even better meat, all of second-generation deli masters Tom and Tony Baier's house-cured meats are available in sandwiches so voluminous that they overwhelm their rye bread holders." In 2018, Willamette Week's Pete Cottell included Edelweiss' "obscure" German candy in his 2018 list of "eight must-have munchies for when you're stoned and starving". In 2019, the newspaper said, "Whether you're in need of a lunchtime bratwurst, dinnertime pork chop, or sausages for later, Edelweiss will not disappoint."

== See also ==
- List of delicatessens
- List of Diners, Drive-Ins and Dives episodes
- List of German restaurants
