= Stammtisch (restaurant) =

German restaurant in Portland, Oregon, U.S.

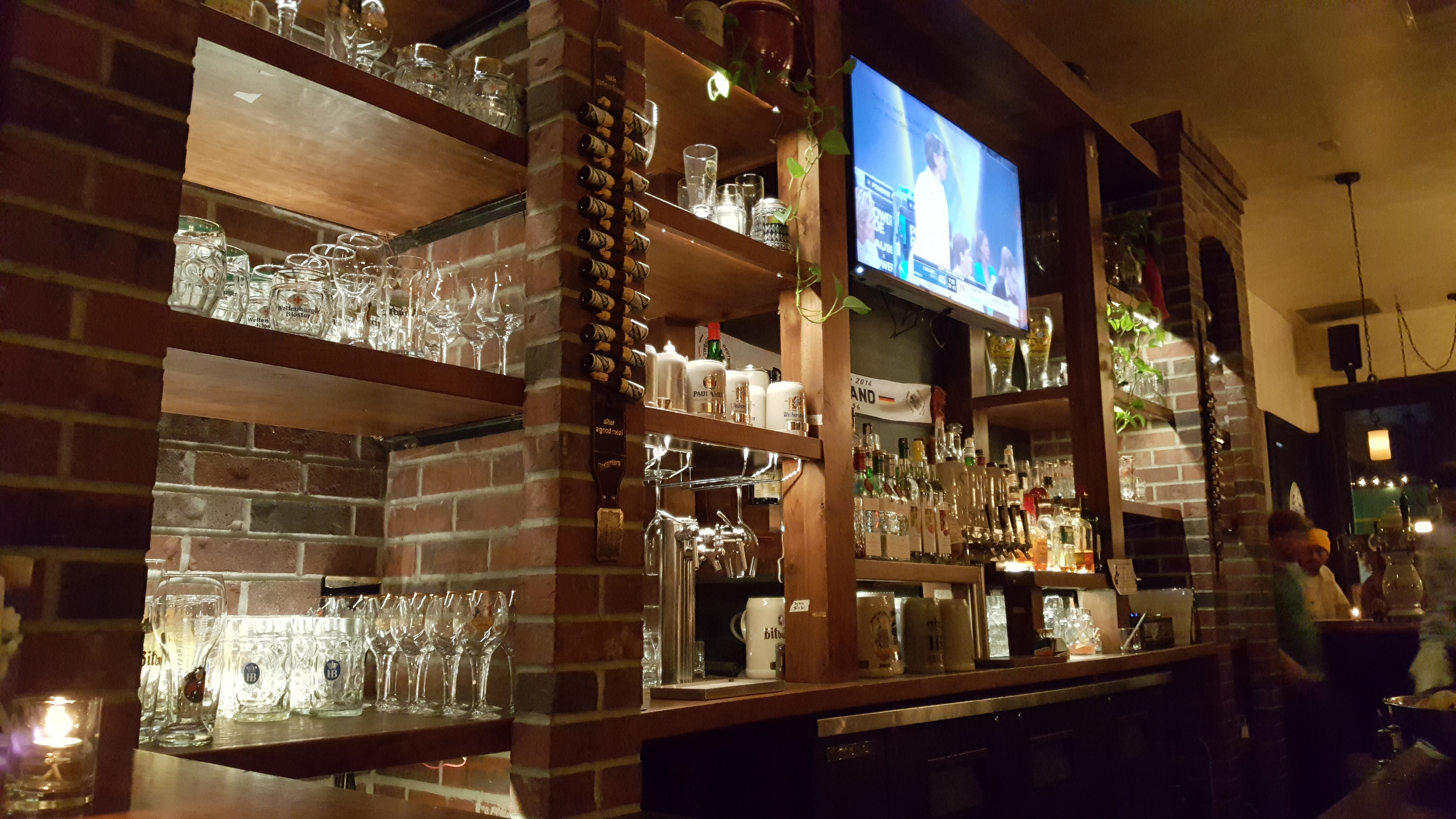
- The restaurant's interior, 2022
- Interactive map of Stammtisch

Restaurant information
- Food type: German
- Location: 401 Northeast 28th Avenue, Portland, Multnomah, Oregon, 97232, United States
- Coordinates: 45°31′33″N 122°38′15″W
- Website: stammtischpdx.com

Stammtisch is a German restaurant in Portland, Oregon.

Stammtish has been described as a "sister restaurant" of the Prost location on Mississippi Avenue in the Boise neighborhood.

== History ==
The restaurant opened in May 2014.

The restaurant participated in Portland's Dumpling Week in 2026.

== Reception ==
Michael Russell included Stammtisch in The Oregonian's 2019 list of the city's 40 best restaurants. He ranked the business number 30 in the newspaper's 2025 list of Portland's 40 best restaurants.

== See also ==
- List of German restaurants
