= Slide Inn =

Restaurant in Portland, Oregon, U.S.

- Interactive map of Slide Inn

Restaurant information
- Owners: Eugen and Lenore Bingham
- Food type: American; German
- Location: 2348 Southeast Ankeny Street, Portland, Multnomah, Oregon, 97214, United States
- Coordinates: 45.5221°N 122.6416°W

The Slide Inn was a restaurant in Portland, Oregon, United States. Owned by Eugen and Lenore Bingham, the restaurant operated in southeast Portland's Buckman neighborhood and served German-inspired American cuisine.

== Description ==
The Slide Inn operated in southeast Portland's Buckman neighborhood. It served American and German cuisine. The Oregonian described the menu as "German-inspired American comfort food". Food options included burgers, fried polenta, pretzels, stroganoff, and wiener schnitzel. Stuffed pancakes were available for brunch. The restaurant also served beer, goulash, onion rings, sausages, and sauerkraut. Eater Portland described the Slide Inn as vegan-friendly.

== History ==
Eugen and Lenore Bingham opened the Slide Inn in 2012, replacing the Italian restaurant Il Piatto. The restaurant hosted a singles night in 2013. It also hosted comedy shows regularly.

The Slide Inn appeared in sketches of the television series Portlandia. It operated via take-out and offered outdoor seating at times during the COVID-19 pandemic. The restaurant was vandalized in 2022.

In April 2026, the business announced plans to close permanently on May 10.

== Reception ==
The restaurant was given a rating of 'C+' by a writer for The Oregonian.

== See also ==
- List of defunct restaurants of the United States
- List of German restaurants
