= Rheinlander Bakery =

Restaurant in Arvada, Colorado, U.S.

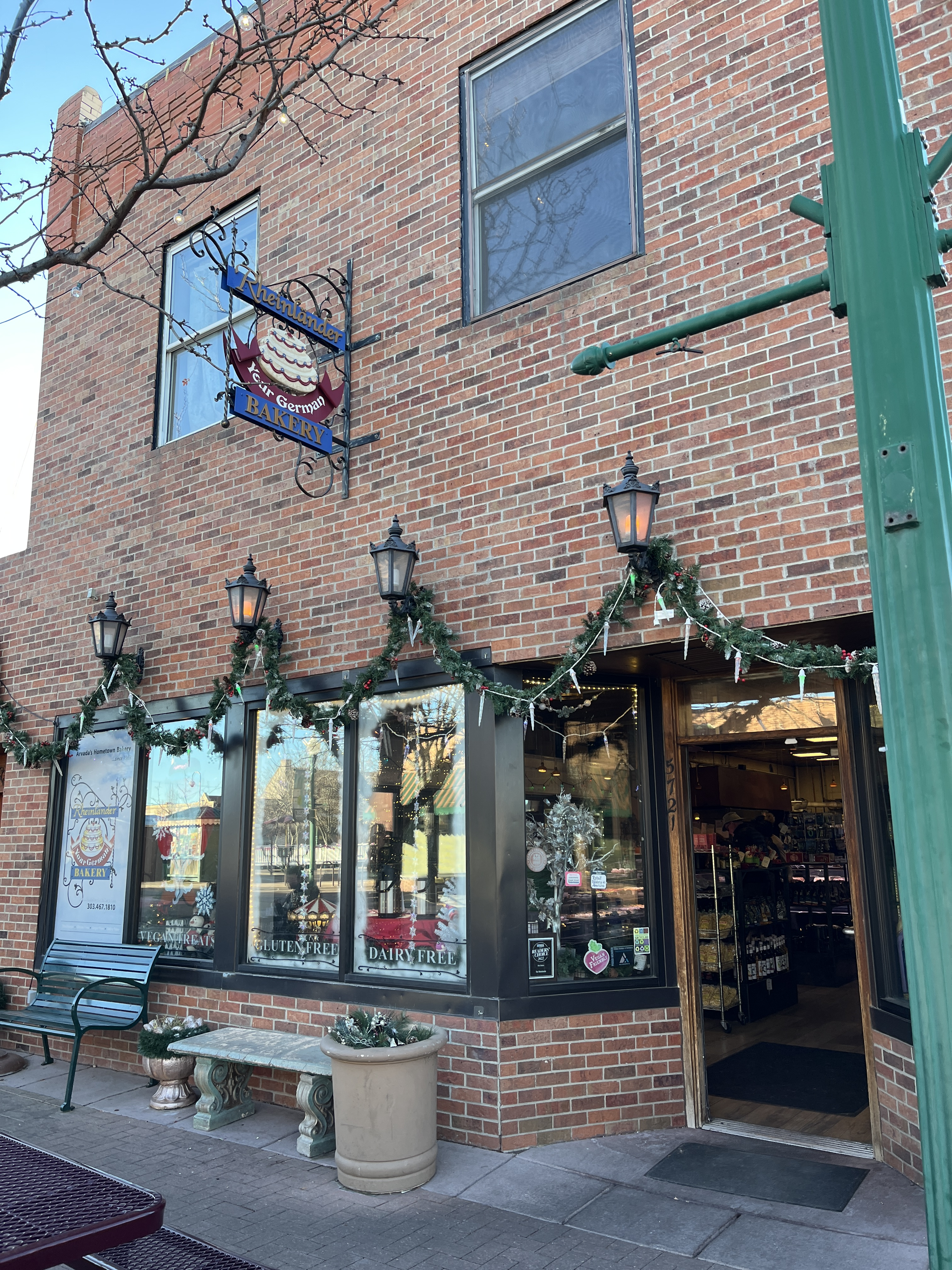
- The bakery's exterior, 2025
- Interactive map of Rheinlander Bakery

Restaurant information
- Established: 1963
- Owners: Loren and Luke Naftz
- Previous owners: Ed and Maro Dimmer
- Location: 5721 Olde Wadsworth Blvd., Arvada, Colorado, United States
- Coordinates: 39°48′03″N 105°04′54″W
- Website: rheinlanderbakery.com

Rheinlander Bakery (formerly Dimmer's Bakery) is a bakery in Arvada, Colorado, United States. It has operated since 1963.

== Description ==
The family-operated Rheinlander Bakery is a German bakery in Olde Town Arvada. The shop has sold baklava, bearclaws, biscotti, apple and cherry turnovers, and cinnamon rolls, as well as coffee cakes, cookies, Danish pastries, European-style tortes, and rye breads. There are gluten-, sugar-, and wheat-free options. The bakery also sells king cakes annually, as well as strudels and yule logs.

A mural of an octopus by Patrick Maxcy appears on the bakery's north exterior.

== History ==
The business has operated since 1963. Ed and Maro Dimmer were owners, until Loren and Luke Naftz took over in 2021. The bakery hosts Strudelfest. It made train-themed baked goods to celebrate the opening of the G Line in 2019 .

== Reception ==
The bakery won in the Best Store in Olde Town Arvada category of Westword's annual 'Best of Denver' readers' poll in 2008. CBS Colorado included Rheinlander in a 2011 list of the top places for buying bread in Denver.

== See also ==
- List of bakeries
- List of German restaurants
