= Berlin Inn =

Defunct German restaurant in Portland, Oregon, US

Berlin Inn Restaurant and Bakery
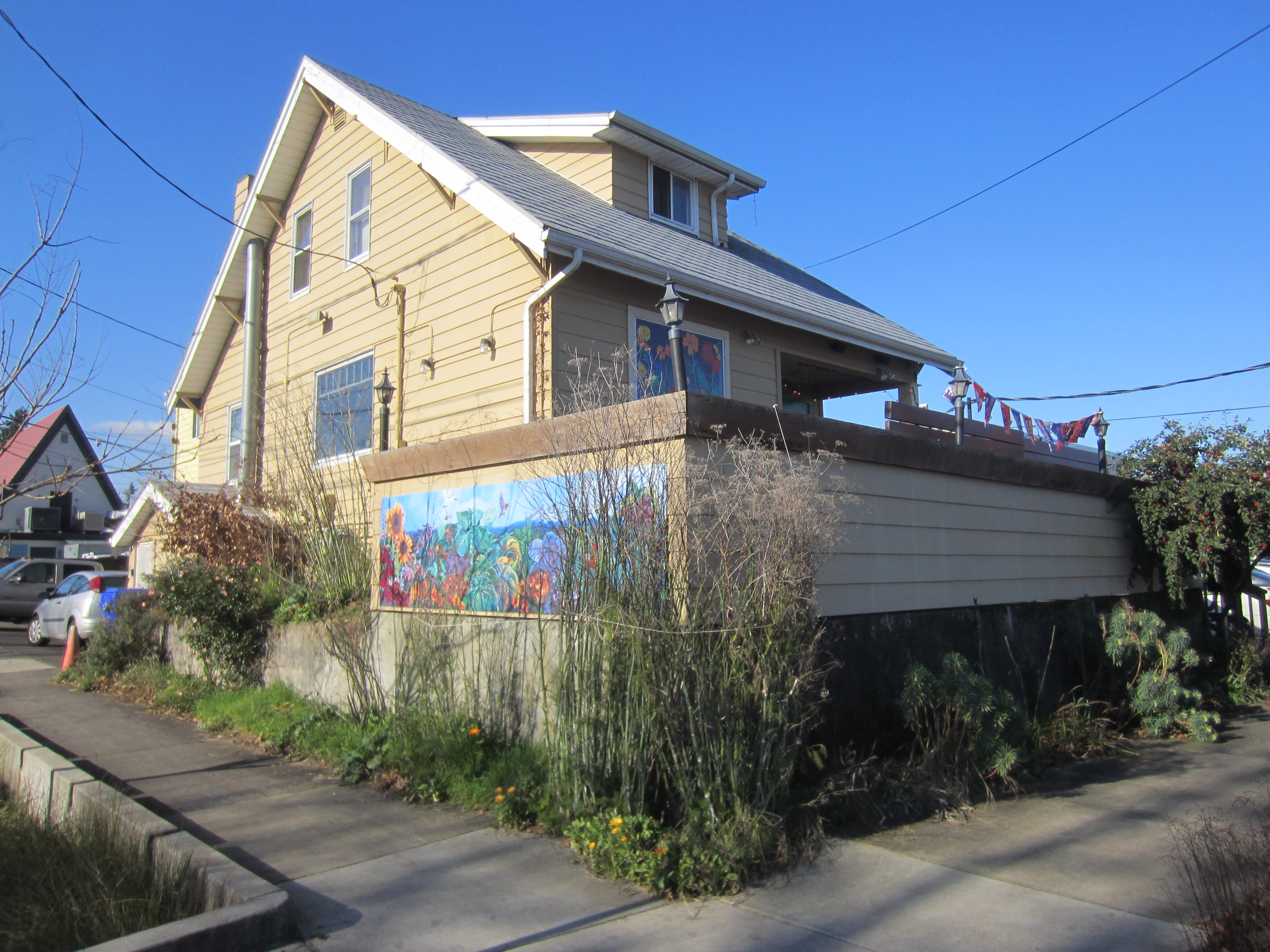
- Exterior of the building which housed the Berlin Inn from 1992 to 2013, in 2021
- Interactive map of Berlin Inn Restaurant and Bakery

Restaurant information
- Established: 1992
- Closed: June 22, 2013
- Food type: German
- Location: 3131 Southeast 12th Avenue, Portland, Multnomah, Oregon, 97202, United States
- Coordinates: 45.5004°N 122.6534°W

The Berlin Inn Restaurant and Bakery (or simply the Berlin Inn) was a German restaurant in Portland, Oregon.

== Description ==
The restaurant operated in a "gasthaus" (converted house) at 12th Avenue and Powell in southeast Portland's Brooklyn neighborhood. Grant Butler of The Oregonian described the old house's interior as "cozy". The menu featured German cuisine and included cheese blintzes, fondue, rouladen, sauerbraten, sausages, schnitzel, and a crispy baked kale salad, as well as German beers and wines. Scrambles with homemade veal sausage were available on the brunch menu.

== History ==
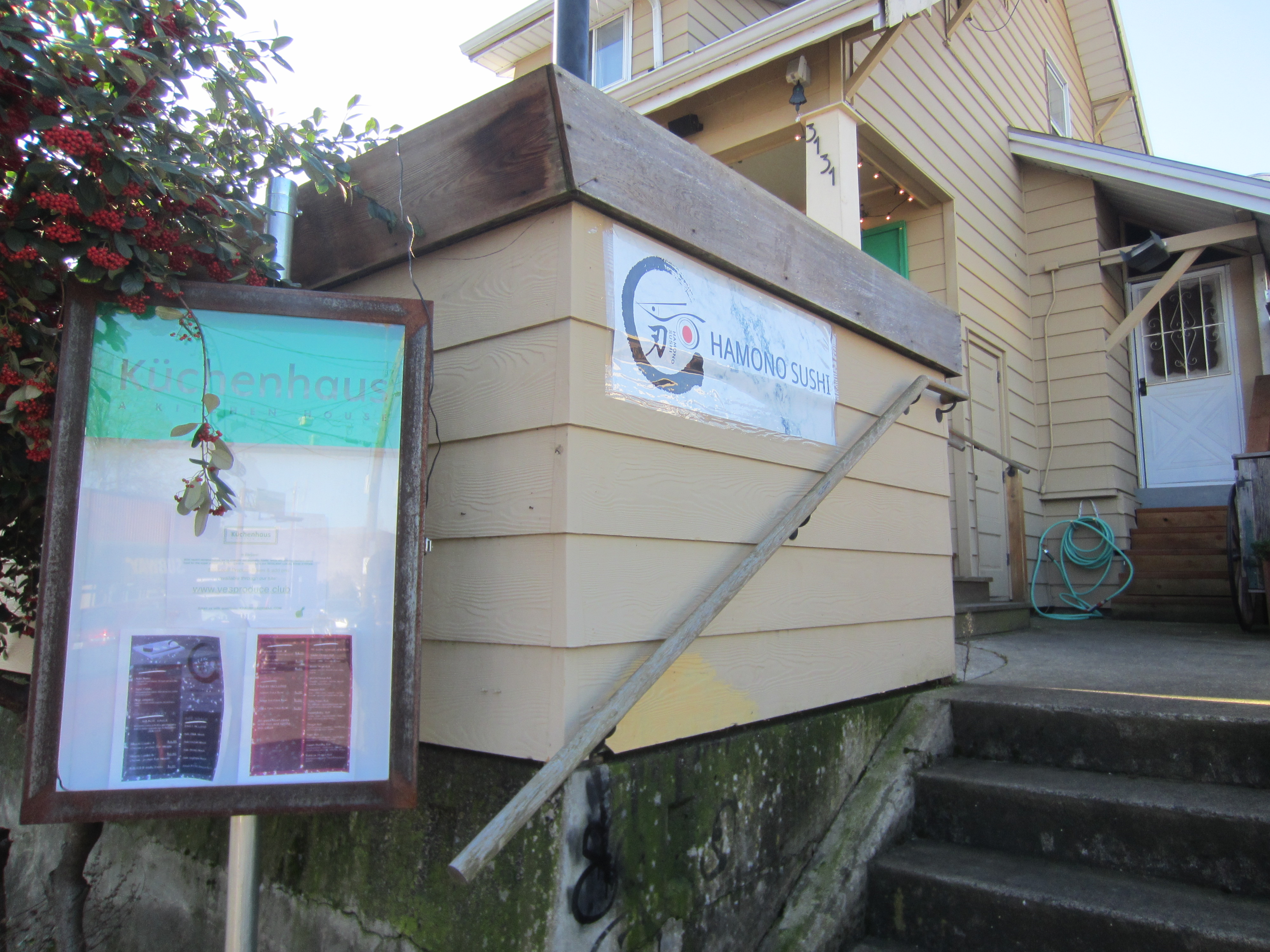
2021 photograph of the exterior of the building which housed the Berlin Inn, with a sign for Hamono Sushi

Karen Brauer was a co-owner of the Berlin Inn, which opened in 1992 and operated for 21 years. Todd Haynes frequented the restaurant.

In June 2013, Brauer confirmed plans to close and reopen under a new name, The Brooklyn House Restaurant, but retaining the same staff and European-style dining. The Berlin Inn closed on June 22. The restaurant's general manager Erica Litzner became a co-owner of Brooklyn House Restaurant (or simply Brooklyn House), along with Lisa Samuels. The duo had previously operated the business Eat Here Now Fresh Local Food together. The restaurant's menu featured dairy-free, gluten-free, and vegan "European-style" comfort food. Some former Berlin Inn employees worked at the Brooklyn House, which opened in August 2013. The aesthetic remained similar, according to Walker MacMurdo of Willamette Week. By 2020, sushi chef Albert Chen had opened the restaurant Hamono Sushi in the house which was previously occupied by the Berlin Inn and Brooklyn House, following "a period of inactivity".

== Reception ==
In 2016, Grant Butler included the Berlin Inn in The Oregonian's list of "97 long-gone Portland restaurants we wish were still around", writing: "This Brooklyn neighborhood German restaurant was the place to go if you wanted sausages and schnitzel without a side order of singing waiters and Deutschland kitsch."

== See also ==
- List of German restaurants
