= Prost (restaurant) =

Small chain of German restaurants in the United States

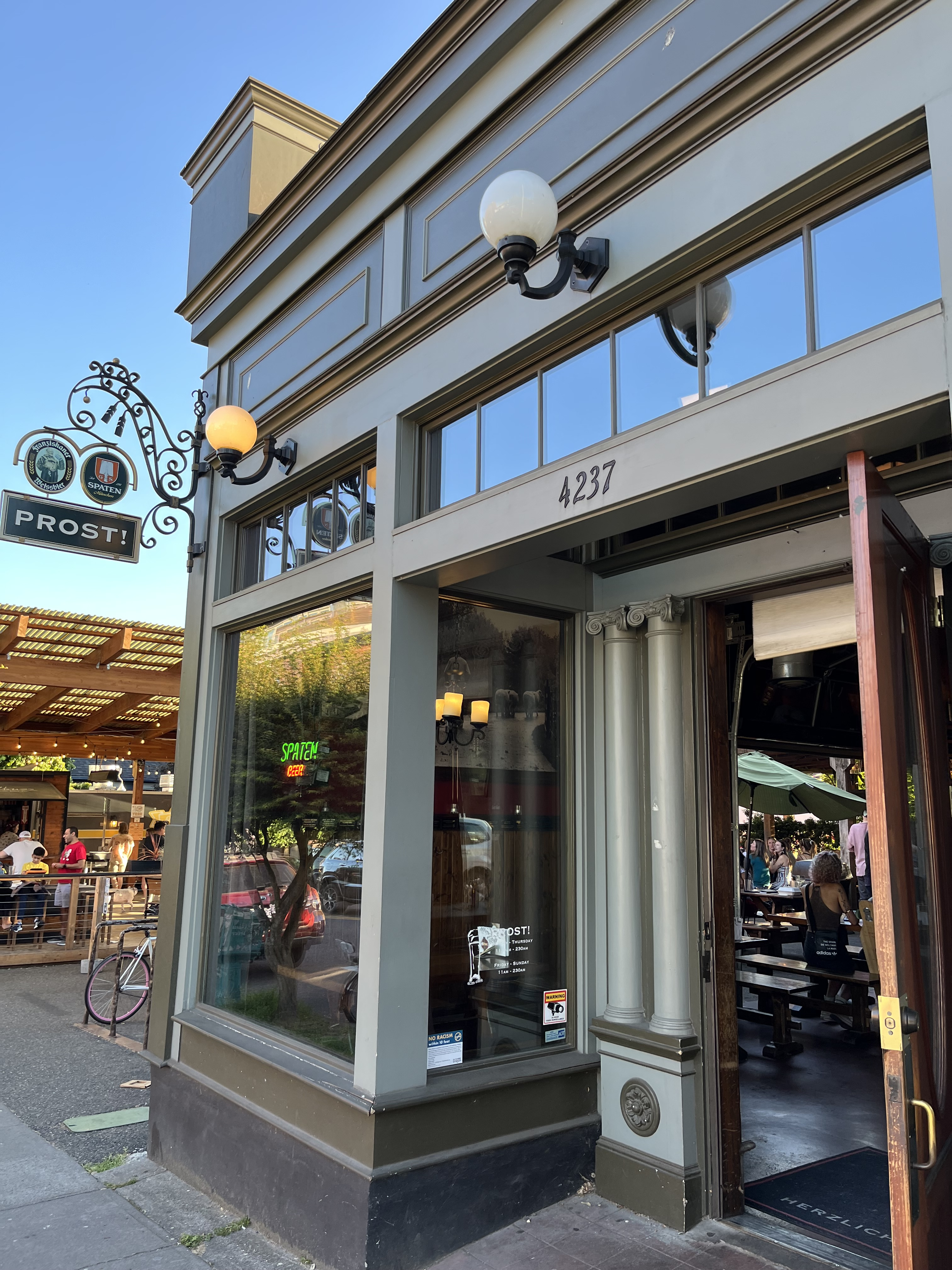
- Exterior of the restaurant in Portland, Oregon, in 2022
- Interactive map of Prost

Restaurant information
- Food type: German
- Location: 4237 N Mississippi Ave, Portland, Oregon, 97217, United States
- Coordinates: 45.5545°N 122.6758°W

Prost is a small chain of German beer bars in the United States.

== Locations ==
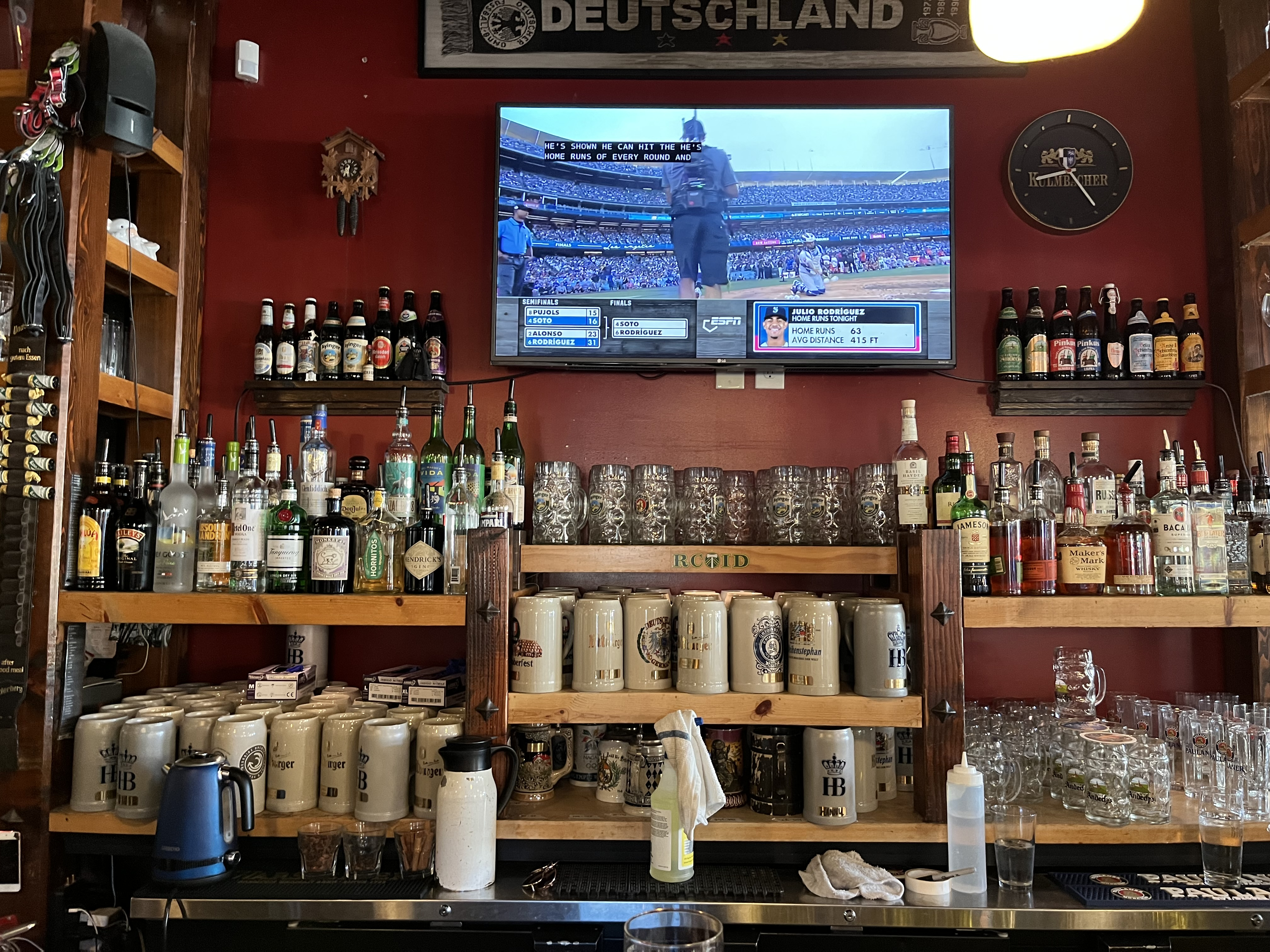
Interior of the restaurant in Portland, Oregon, 2022

As of 2021, the business operates in Seattle; Portland, Oregon; Boise, Idaho; and Bend, Oregon.

The beer bar in north Portland is located on Mississippi Avenue in the Boise neighborhood. Stammtish has been described as a "sister restaurant" of the Portland location. The menu includes "traditional German dishes centered on the staples of bratwurst, sauerkraut, pickles, and German rye", as well as braunschweiger, Bavarian pretzel, and wurst.

== Reception ==
In 2018, Pete Cottell of Thrillist included Prost in "The Beer Drinker's Ultimate Guide to Portland", writing: "Prost is a world-class German beer-lovers bar, and they've got the glassware, accoutrements, and beer selection to prove it. Lagers steeped in old-world tradition are the go-to for a sunny day on the back deck, but don't sleep on some of the Bavarian oddities that never hit it big with macro brewers. We humbly suggest a smoky rauchbier, a clean and crisp helles, or the subtly sweet tinge of a bananaweizen." The website's Emma Banks and Bradley Foster also included the restaurant in a 2022 list of "The Absolute Best Sports Bars in Seattle".

== See also ==
- Beer in Germany
- List of German restaurants
- Prost Marketplace
