= Heartbreak (restaurant) =

Defunct restaurant in New York City, U.S.

- Interactive map of Heartbreak

Restaurant information
- Established: 2010
- Closed: 2011
- Food type: German
- Location: 29 East 2nd Street, New York City, New York, 10003, United States
- Coordinates: 40°43′29.8″N 73°59′26.3″W

Heartbreak was a restaurant in New York City. The German restaurant had received a Michelin star, before closing in 2011.

== See also ==
- List of defunct restaurants of the United States
- List of German restaurants
- List of Michelin-starred restaurants in New York City
