= Schöner Brunnen =

Gothic fountain in Nuremberg

Coordinates: 49°27′15.23″N 11°04′37.40″E

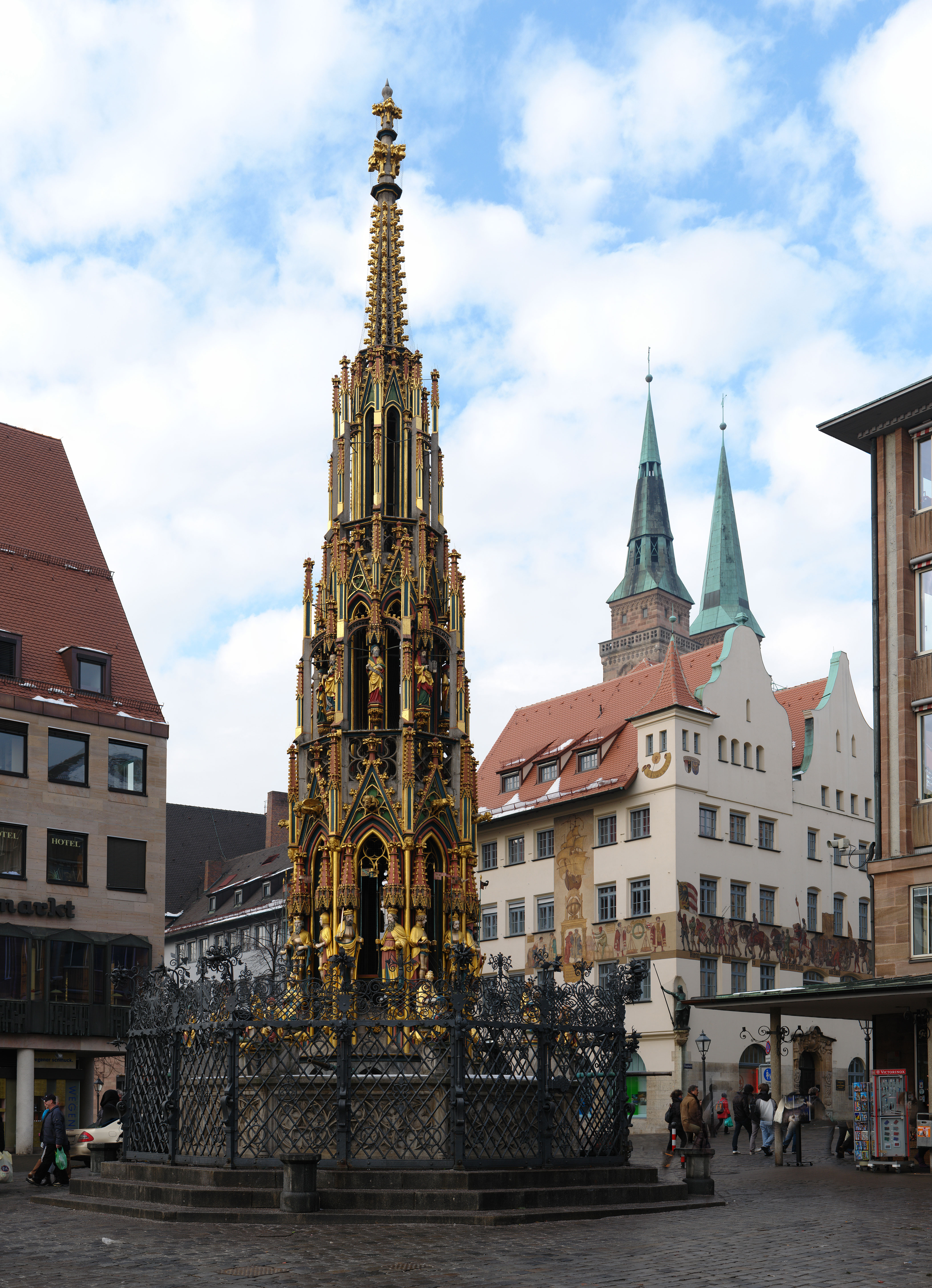

Schöner Brunnen (en:beautiful fountain) is a 14th-century fountain located on Nuremberg's main market next to the town hall and is considered one of the main attractions of the city's Historical Mile. The fountain is approximately 19 metres high and has the shape of a Gothic spire.

== History ==
The fountain was built by Heinrich Beheim from 1385 to 1396. During World War II the fountain was surrounded by concrete to protect it from bombings.

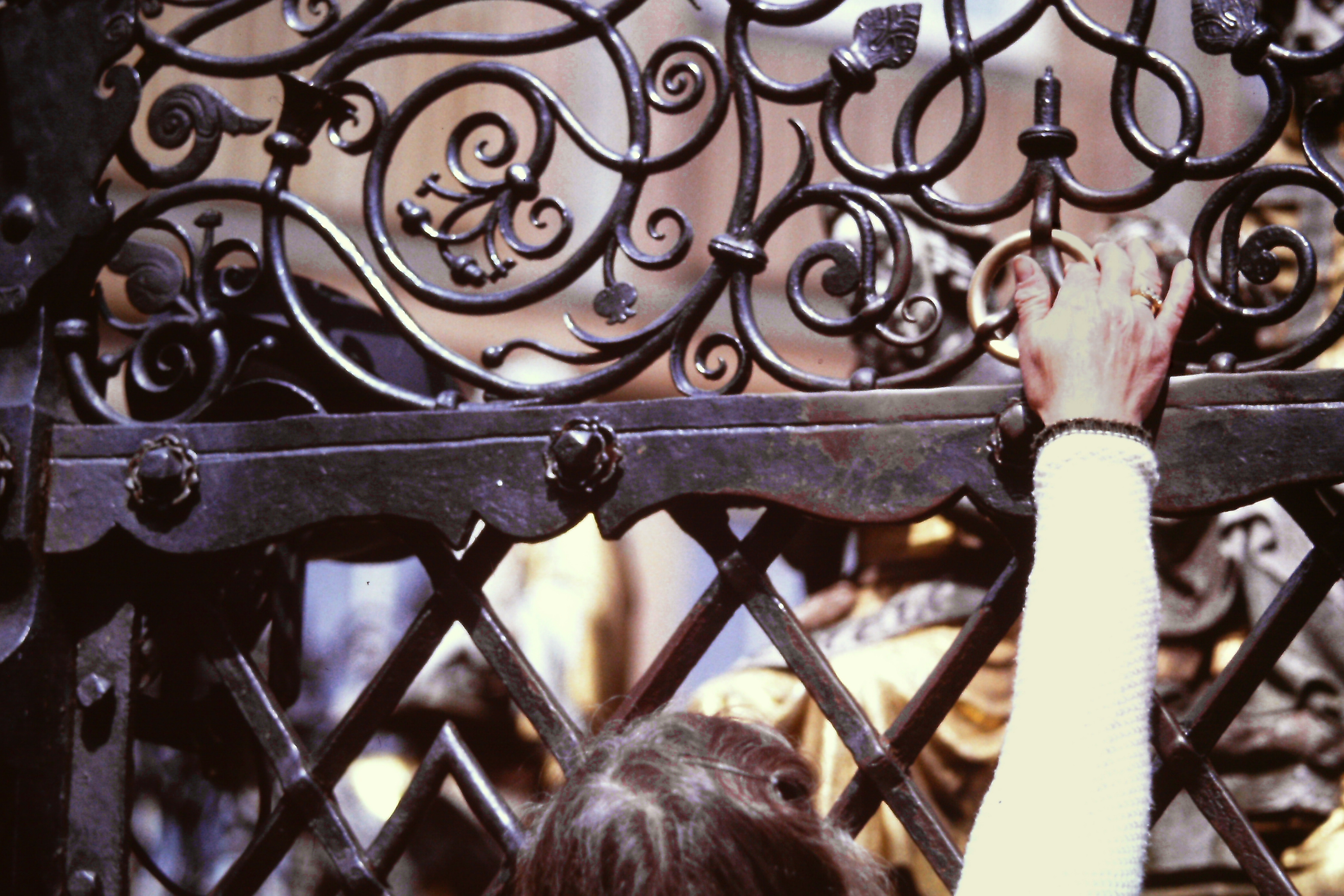
Spinning the good luck bringing wish ring
