= Heinrich Beheim =

German stonemason and architect

Heinrich Beheim (died 1403) was a German stone mason and architect in Nuremberg. His main works are the Schöner Brunnen and the porch of the Frauenkirche.
