= Alte Taverne =

- Native name: Wirtshaus Alte Taverne
- Industry: Restaurant
- Founded: 1595
- Headquarters: Untere Inntalstrasse 16, 94072 Bad Füssing - Würding, Germany
- Website: www.altetaverne.de

Alte Taverne is a traditional restaurant founded in 1595 and located in Bad Füssing, Bavaria, Germany.

The building contains tufts of the former Magdalenen church in Rotthalmünster and in the summer visitors can use the naturally-grown beer garden.

== See also ==
- List of oldest companies
