= Herman ze German =

Chain of fast food restaurants in London

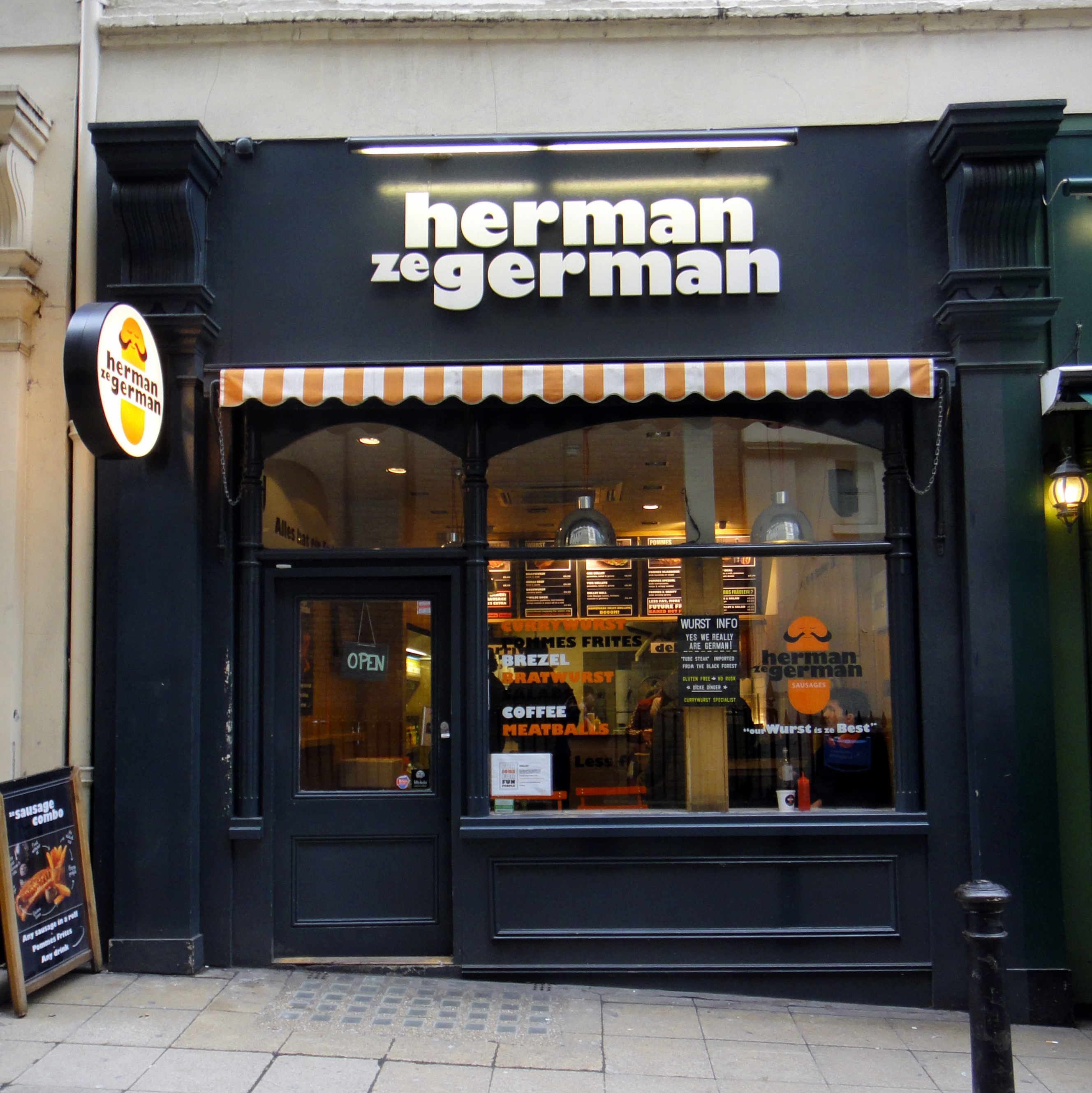
- Villiers Street, March 2013.

Restaurant information
- Established: 2008
- Closed: 2020
- Location: United Kingdom
- Website: Archived link

Herman ze German (2008–2020) was a small chain of fast food restaurants offering German sausage dishes. At its peak it comprised four locations in London as well as one in Birmingham and in addition operated a food truck in Lörrach, Germany.

The restaurants offered a small number of mostly meat based fast food dishes popular in Germany, such as Currywurst, Bockwurst or Schnitzel. They were offered with french fries, bread, coleslaw or sauerkraut as side dishes. The meat was imported from butchers in Southern Germany.

According to the owners, the brand was forced to close all its restaurants in the UK permanently as a result of the COVID-19 pandemic.
