= List of mountains and hills of North Rhine-Westphalia =

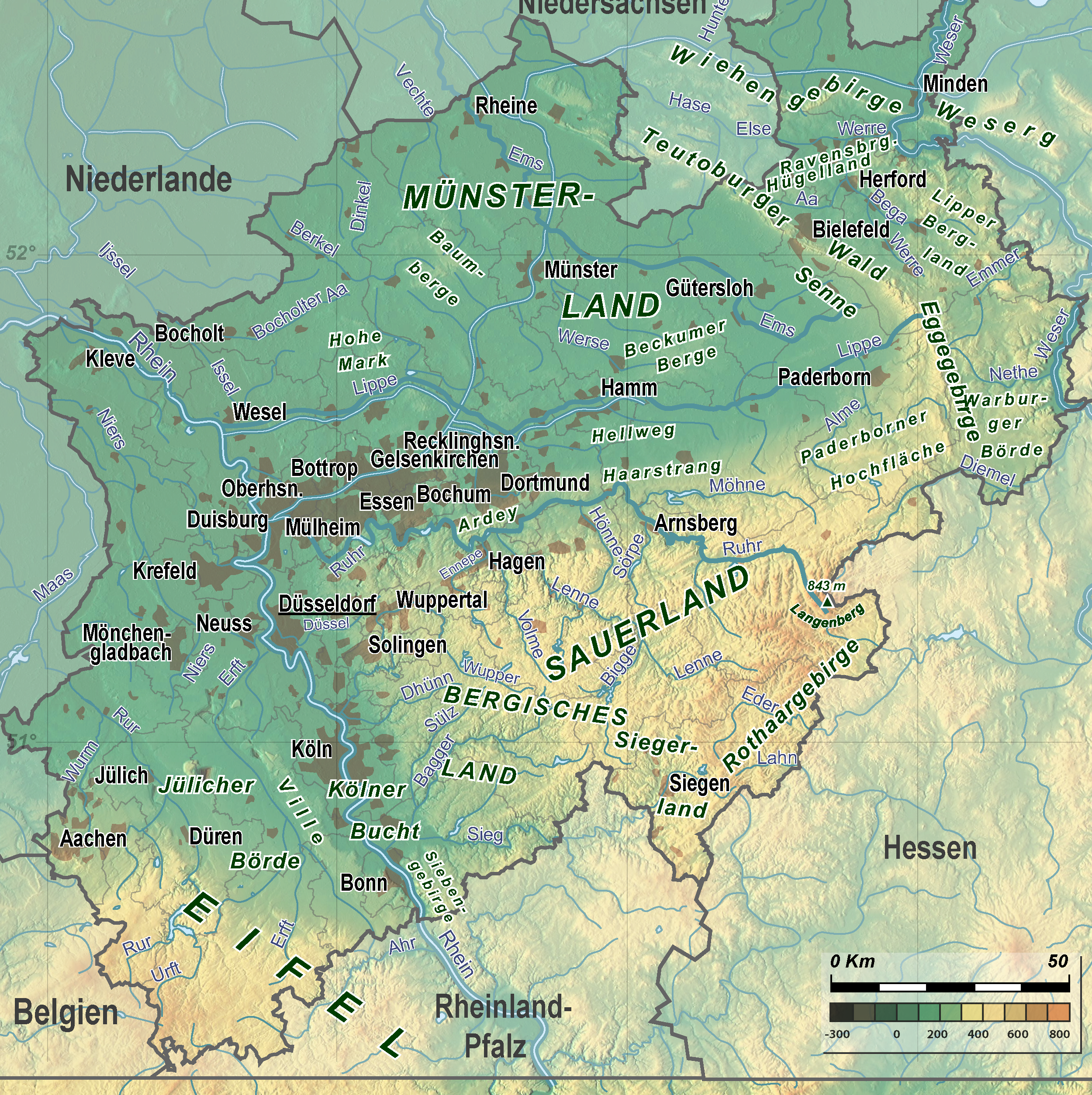
Topography of North Rhine-Westphalia

This list of the mountains and hills in North Rhine-Westphalia shows a selection of high or well-known mountains and hills in the German state of North Rhine-Westphalia (in order of height).

== Highest points of the North Rhine-Westphalian provinces ==
The following table gives the highest hill or point in the five provinces (Regierungsbezirke) of North Rhine-Westphalia.

By clicking on the word "List" in the "Lists" column you will be taken to a list of other hills in the respective region or hill range (some of which lie partly outside of North Rhine-Westphalia). The table is listed in order of height, but can be sorted by other columns by clicking on the symbol at the head.

Highest summit	Height (m)	Region/range	Lists	Province
Langenberg	843.2	Rothaar	List	Arnsberg
Weißer Stein	693	Eifel (Zitterwald)	List	Cologne
Köterberg	495.8	Weser Uplands	List	Detmold*
Brodtberg	378.9	Bergisches Land	---	Düsseldorf
Westerbecker Berg	236	Teutoburg Forest	List	Münster

- The highest point in the Province of Detmold is on the flank of the Totenkopf in the Sauerland near Bad Wünnenberg. The provincial boundary runs up to a height of 498 m above sea level (NN).

== Highest points of the North Rhine-Westphalian regions ==
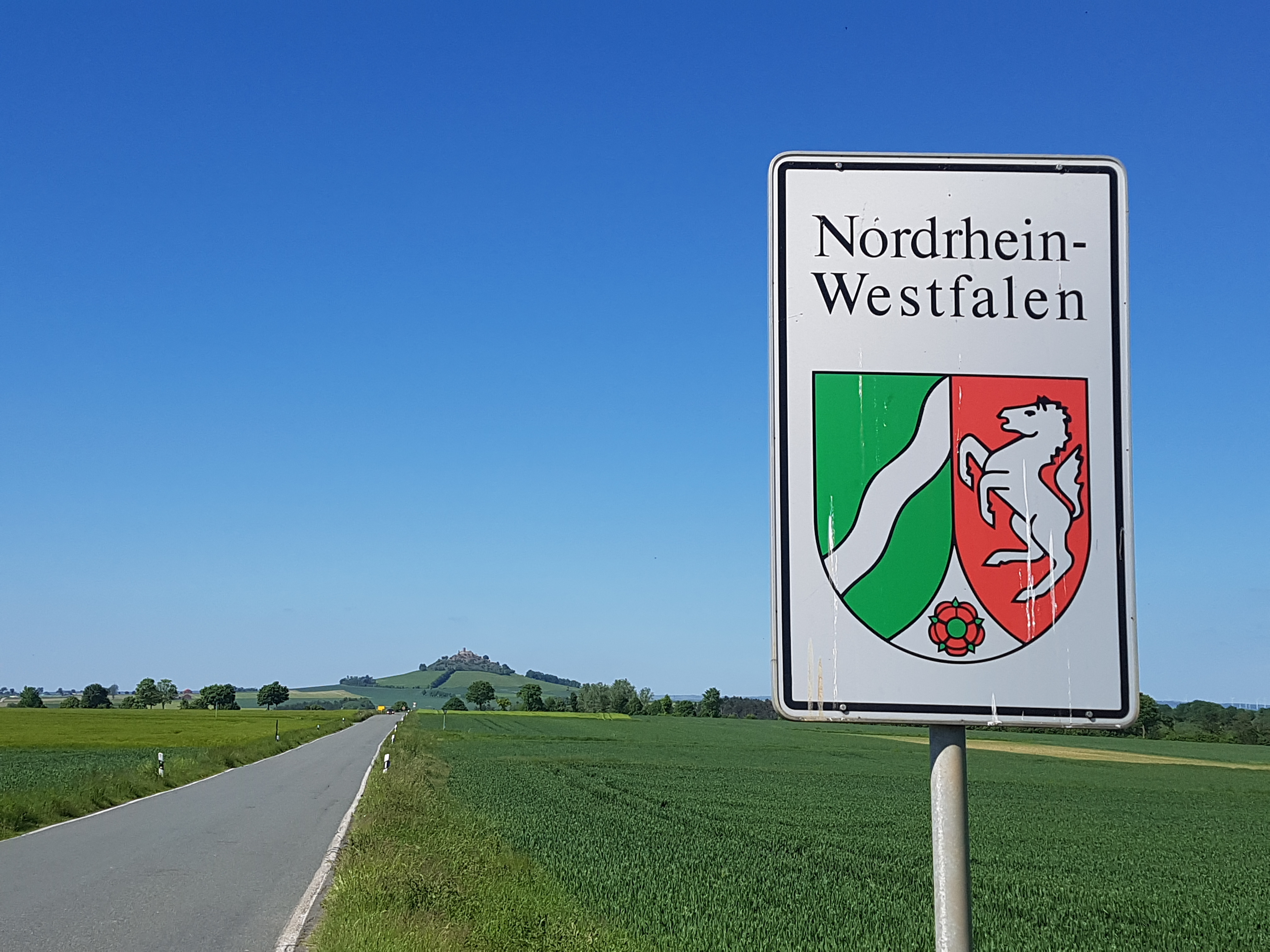
The Desenberg (345 m) nearby the town of Warburg. View from the border between the states of North Rhine-Westphalia and Hesse

In the following table are the highest mountains and hills in the various North Rhine-Westphalian landscapes (regions or hill ranges).

In the "Landscape" column, major hill ranges are shown in bold and landscape units that have no significant local high point or are basins, whose (sometimes island-like) high points have some isolation, are shown in italics. Clicking "List" in the rows of the "List" column links to other hills or mountains in that landscape – some of which are outside of North Rhine-Westphalia. The table is arranged by height, but may be sorted by other criteria by clicking the symbol of the desired column.

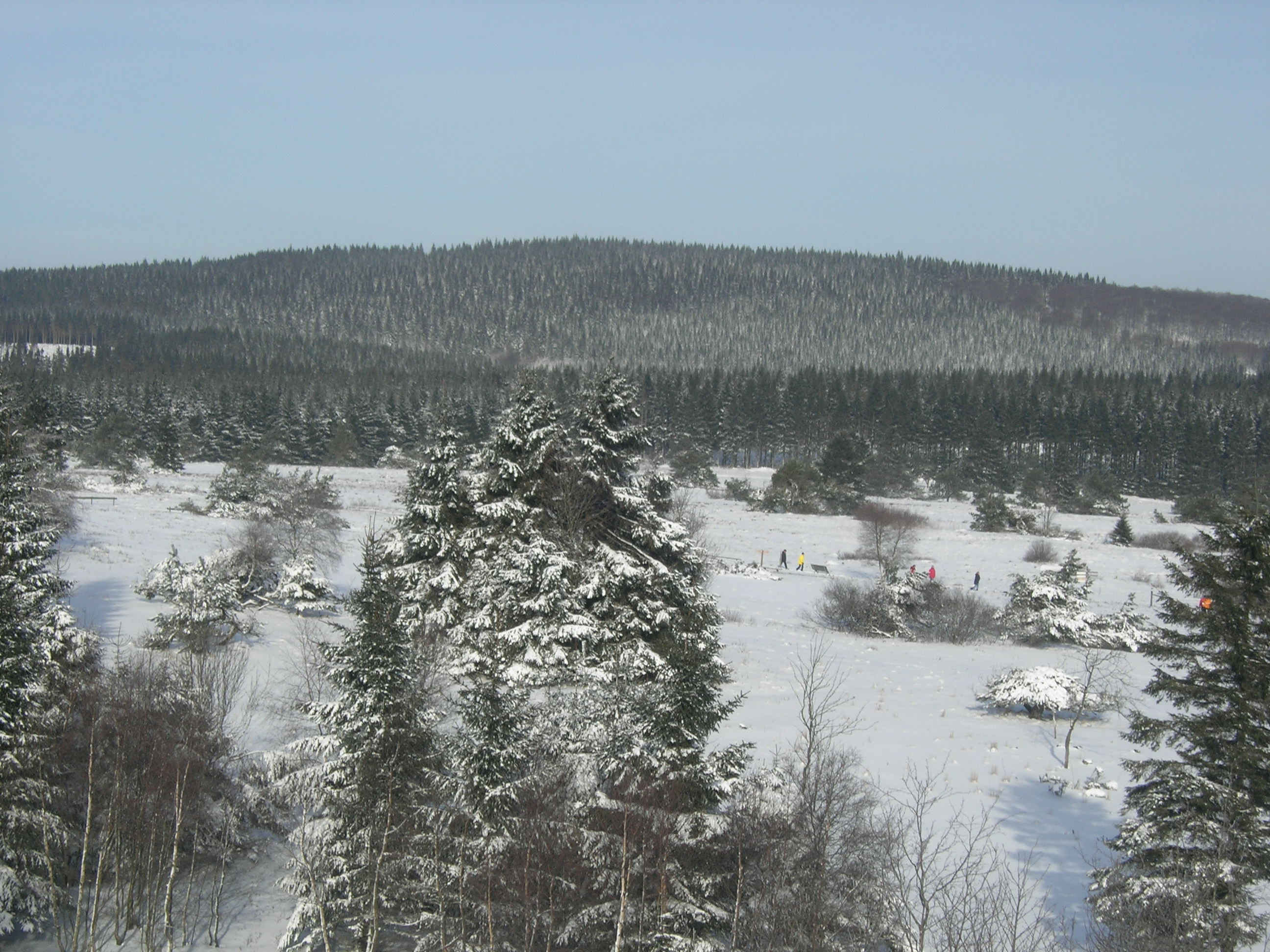
Langenberg (Rothaar)

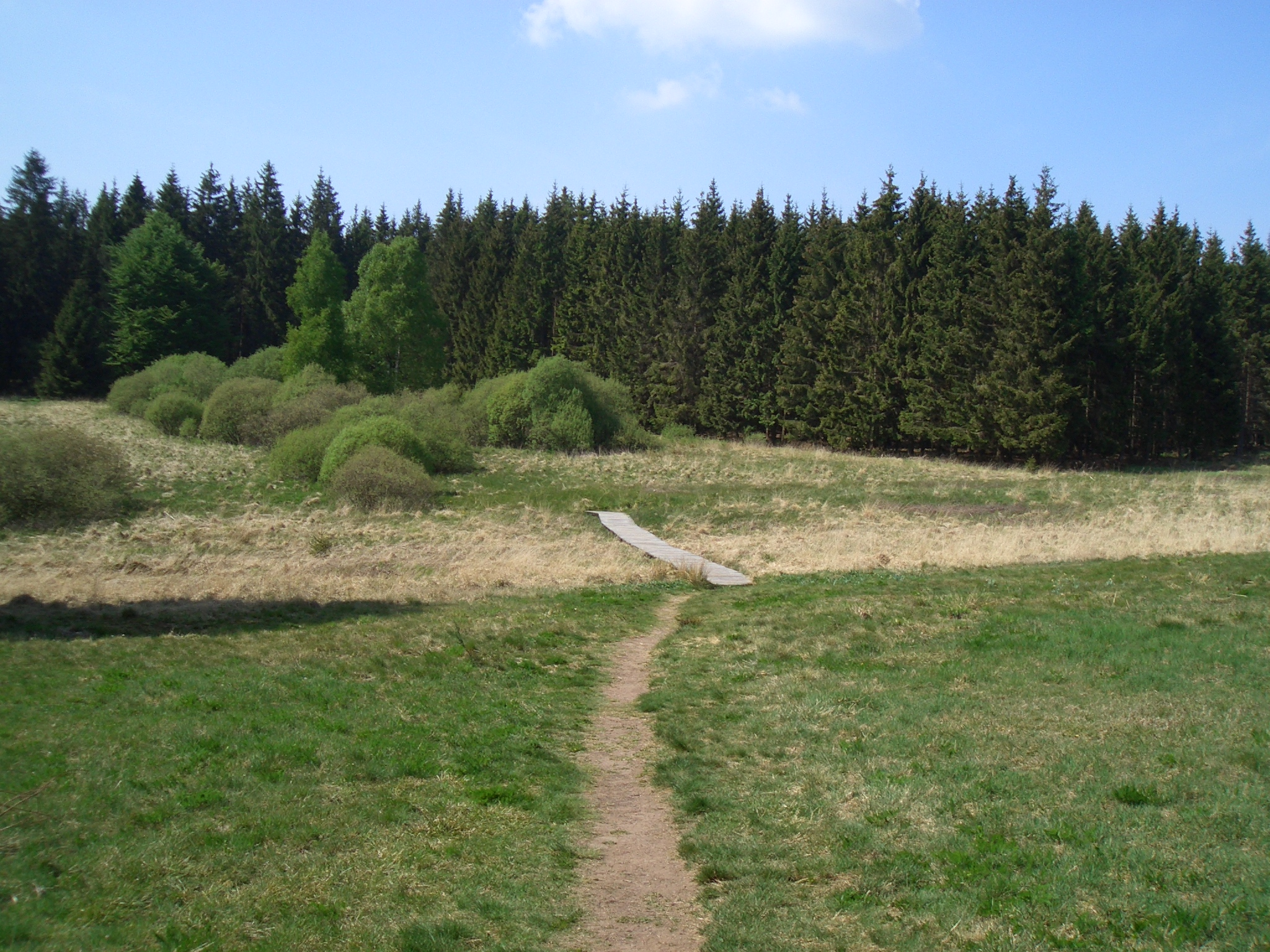
Weißer Stein (Eifel; Zitterwald)

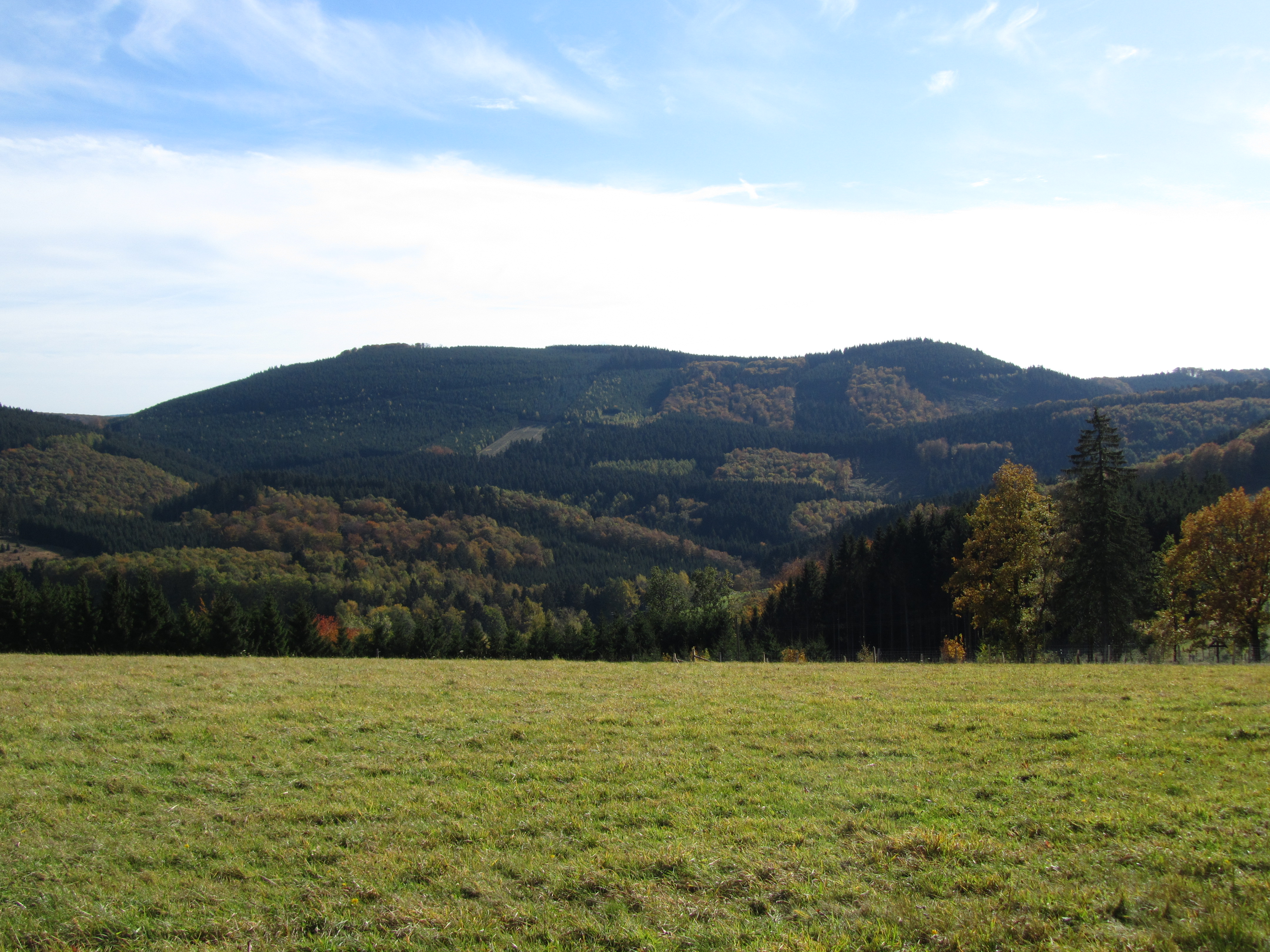
Himberg (Saalhauser Berge)

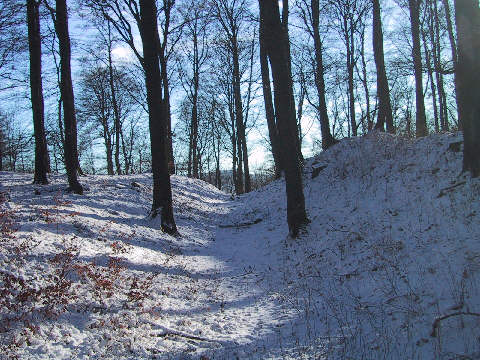
Borberg (Brilo Heights)

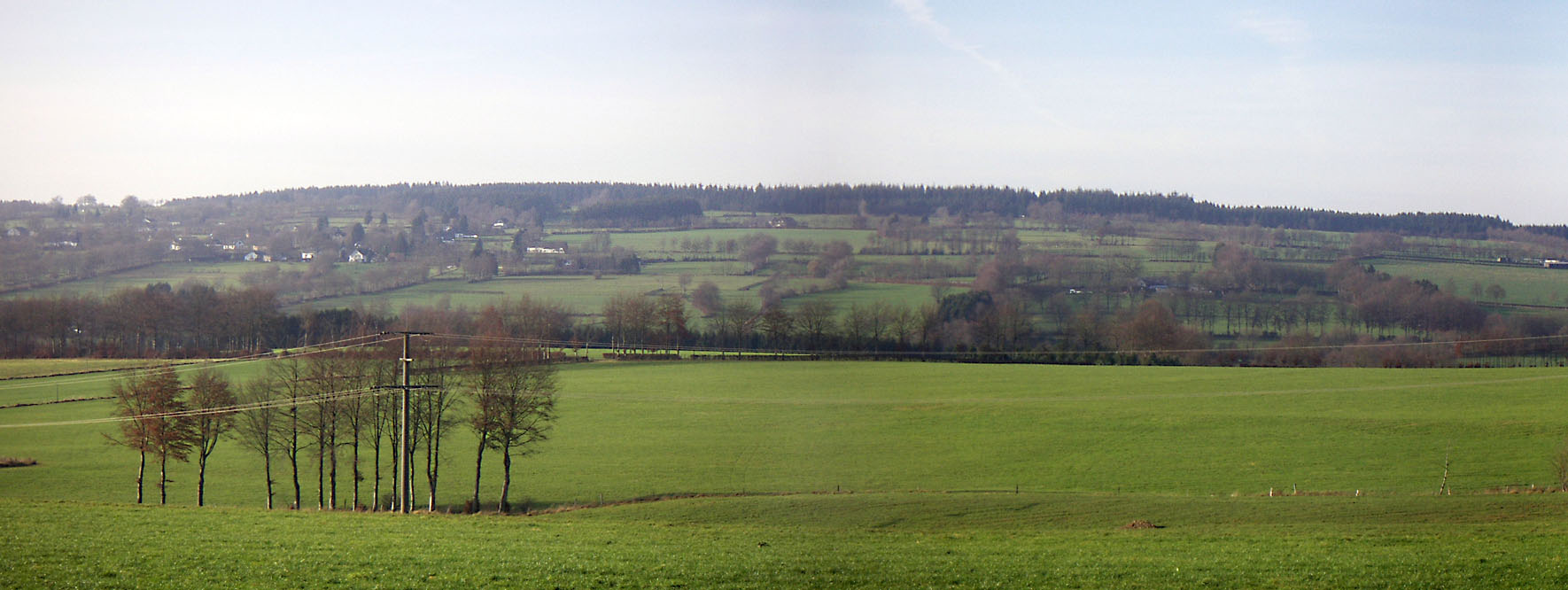
Steling (Eifel; Rur Eifel)

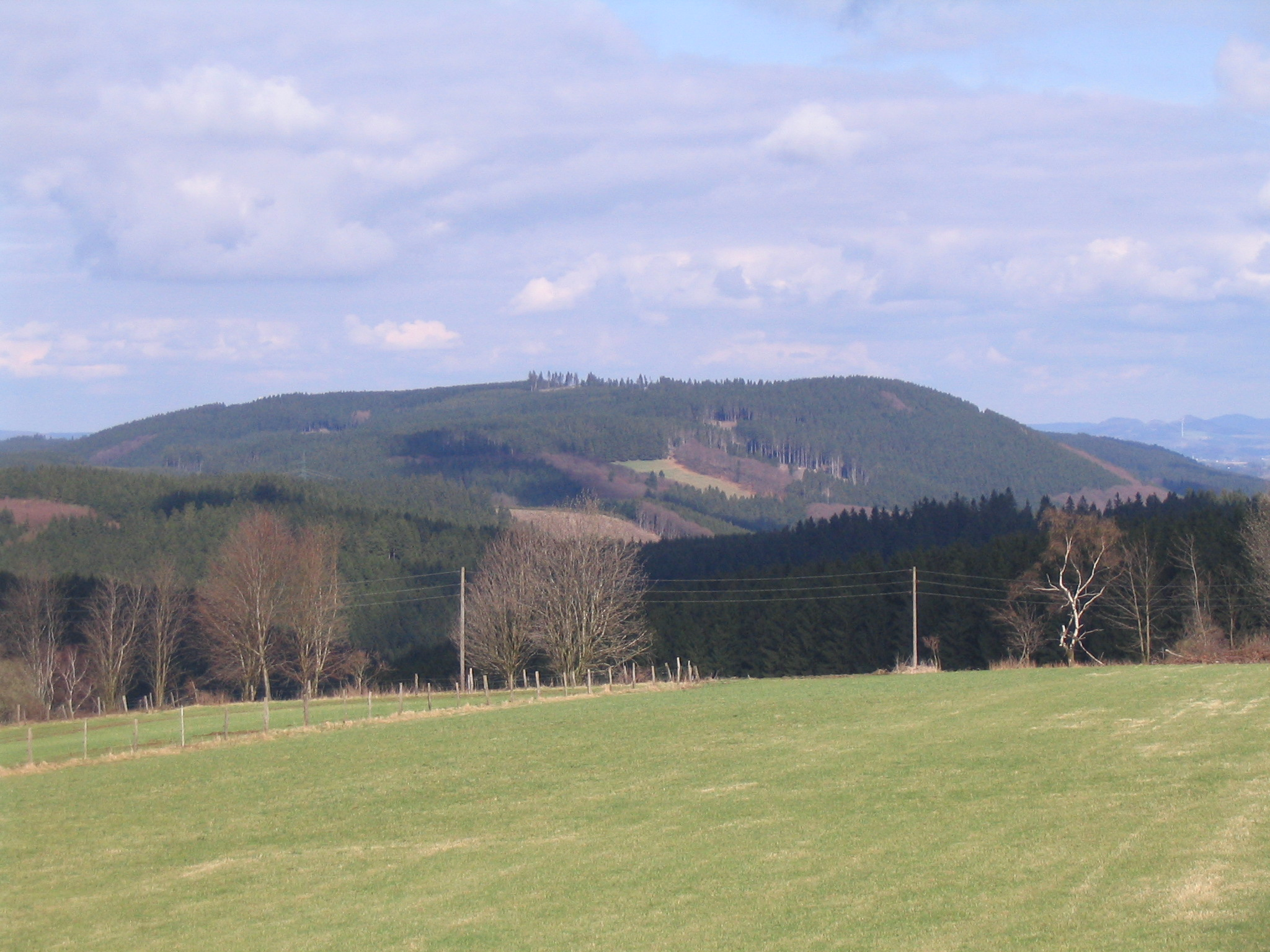
Homert (Lennegebirge)

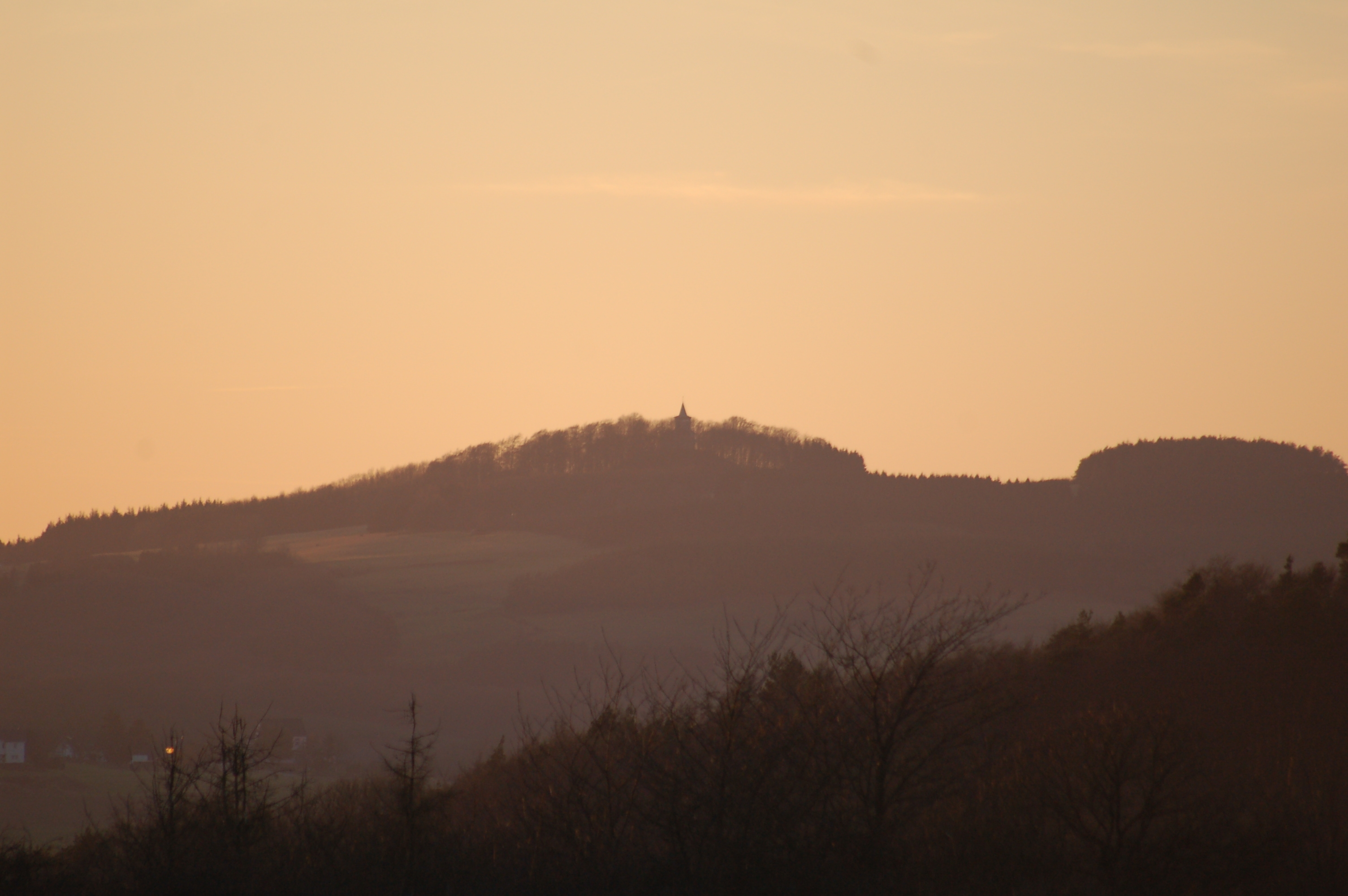
Michelsberg (Eifel; Ahrgebirge)

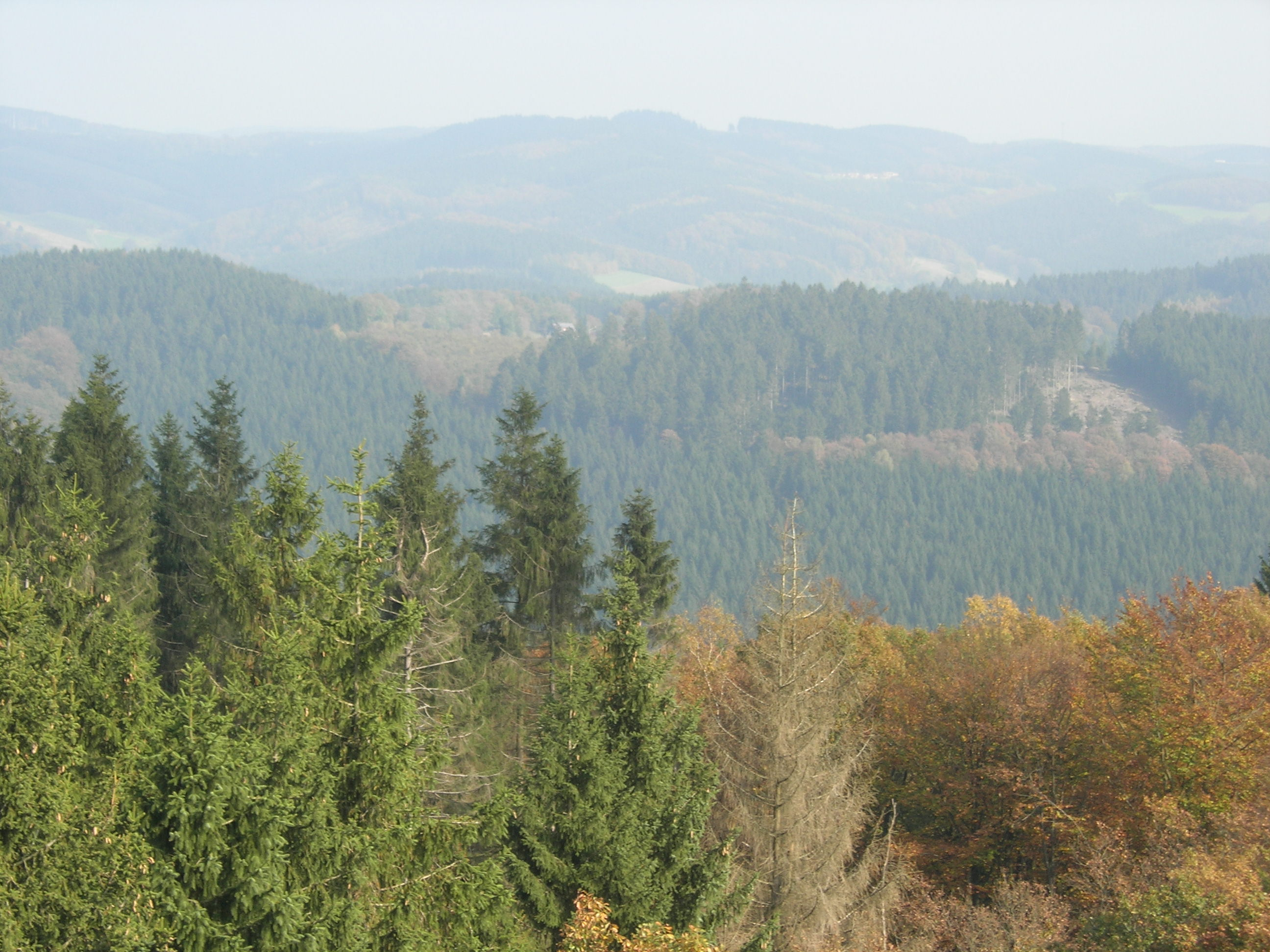
Homert (Bergisches Land)

Mountain / hill	Height (m)	Landscape	Lists	District(s) (or states) free towns
Langenberg	843.2	**Rothaar**	List	Hochsauerland (North Rhine-Westphalia); Waldeck-Frankenberg; Hesse
Weißer Stein	693	**Eifel** (Zitterwald)	List; List	Euskirchen
Himberg	688.5	Saalhauser Berge	List	Hochsauerland, Olpe
Borberg	670.2	Brilon Heights	List	Hochsauerland
Nordhelle; Ebbegebirge	663.3	Ebbegebirge	List	Märkischer Kreis
Steling	658.3	Rur Eifel; Part of the Eifel	--- List	Städteregion Aachen
Homert; Lennegebirge	656.1	Lennegebirge	List	Hochsauerland
Nenkersberg	610.3	**Westerwald**	List	Siegen-Wittgenstein
Michelsberg	586.1	Ahr Hills; Part of the Eifel	List; List	Euskirchen
Langschoß	585.2	Hürtgen Forest; Part of the Eifel	--- List	Städteregion Aachen
unnamed summit	581.5	Arnsberg Forest	List	Soest
unnamed summit	527.8	Kermeter; Part of the Eifel	List; List	Euskirchen
Homert; Oberbergischer Kreis	519.0	Bergisches Land	---	Oberbergischer Kreis
Köterberg	495.8	**Weser Uplands**	List	Kreis Lippe (North Rhine-Westphalia), Kreis Höxter (North Rhine-Westphalia); Holzminden (Lower Saxony)
Preußischer Velmerstot	468	Eggegebirge	List	Kreis Paderborn
Großer Ölberg	460.1	Siebengebirge	List	Rhein-Sieg
Karpkeberg	456.2	Sintfeld	List	Hochsauerland
Barnacken	446.1	Teutoburg Forest	List	Lippe
Wengeberg	441.0	Ruhrgebiet	---	Ennepe-Ruhr
Spitze Warte	390.6	Haarstrang	---	Soest
Desenberg	343.2	Warburg Börde	---	Höxter (Warburg)
Heidbrink	319.6	Wiehen Hills	List	Minden-Lübbecke
Sophienhöhe (Kippe am Tagebau Hambach)	301.8	Jülich-Zülpich Börde	---	Düren
Burggrafenberg	282.8	Burgholz State Forest	List	Solingen (kreisfreie Stadt); Wuppertal (independent city)
Auf dem Heil	273.8	Ardey Hills	List	Ennepe-Ruhr
Glessener Höhe (spoil tip of a former open-cast mine)	209	Ville	List	Rhein-Erft
Westerberg; Baumberge (Westerather Berg)	187.6	Baumberge	List	Coesfeld
Kollwesshöh	181.4	Stemweder Berg	List	Minden-Lübbecke
Mackenberg	174.4	Beckum Hills	List	Warendorf
Stimberg	153.8	Haard	List	Recklinghausen
Waldbeerenberg	145.9	Hohe Mark	List	Recklinghausen
Melchenberg	133.8	Reken Hills	List	Coesfeld, Borken
Fischberg	133.3	Borkenberge	List	Recklinghausen
Tannenbültenberg	107.4	Die Berge	List	Borken

== List of mountains and hills ==
Name, Height in metres above NN, Location (district/landscape); three "???" means unknown or not researched; please complete!

1. Langenberg (843.2 m), North Rhine-Westphalia/Hesse, Hochsauerland district and Waldeck-Frankenberg district, Rothaar
2. Kahler Asten (841.9 m), Hochsauerland district, Rothaar
3. Clemensberg (839.2 m), Hochsauerland district, Rothaar
4. Hopperkopf (832.3 m), North Rhine-Westphalia/Hesse, Hochsauerland district and Waldeck-Frankenberg district, Rothaar
5. Hunau (817.6 m), Hochsauerland district, Rothaar
6. Ziegenhelle (815.5 m), Hochsauerland district, Rothaar
7. Wallershöhe (812 m), Hochsauerland district, Rothaar
8. Bremberg (809 m), Hochsauerland district, Rothaar
9. Hoher Eimberg (806.1 m), North Rhine-Westphalia/Hesse, Hochsauerland district and Waldeck-Frankenberg district
10. Hoppernkopf (805.0 m), North Rhine-Westphalia/Hesse, Hochsauerland district and Waldeck-Frankenberg district, Rothaar
11. Hillekopf (804.9 m), Hochsauerland district, Rothaar
12. Heikersköpfchen (792.4 m), Hochsauerland district
13. Reetsberg (792.2 m), Hochsauerland district, Rothaar
14. Öhrenstein (792.1 m), Hochsauerland district, Rothaar
15. Nordhelle (Rothaar) (between 790 and 799 m), Mark district, Rothaar
16. Schlossberg (790.0 m), Hochsauerland district, Rothaar
17. Auf dem Sternrodt (789.4 m), Hochsauerland district, Rothaar
18. Sange (788.1 m), Hochsauerland district, Rothaar
19. Krutenberg (785.0 m), North Rhine-Westphalia/Hesse, Hochsauerland district and Waldeck-Frankenberg district, Rothaar
20. Junge Grimme (782 m), Hochsauerland district, Rothaar
21. Dreiskopf (781 m), North Rhine-Westphalia/Hesse, Hochsauerland district and Waldeck-Frankenberg district
22. Kahle Pön (775.3 m), North Rhine-Westphalia/Hesse, Hochsauerland district and Waldeck-Frankenberg district, Rothaar
23. Albrechtsberg (768 m), Siegen-Wittgenstein district, Rothaar
24. Rimberg (Winterberg) (764.5 m), Hochsauerland district, Rothaar
25. Bollerberg (757 m), Hochsauerland district, Rothaar
26. Härdler (756 m), Olpe district, Rothaar
27. Poppenberg (746 m), Hochsauerland district, Rothaar
28. Bastenberg (744.8 m), Hochsauerland district, Sauerland
29. Kalied (744.7 m), Hochsauerland district, Rothaar
30. Zwistberg (744 m), Hochsauerland district and Siegen-Wittgenstein district, Rothaar
31. Hohe Hessel (743 m), Olpe district, Rothaar
32. Auf'm Knoll (738 m), North Rhine-Westphalia/Hesse, Hochsauerland district and Waldeck-Frankenberg district, Rothaar
33. Großer Kopf (740 m), Siegen-Wittgenstein district, Rothaar
34. Herrloh (733 m), Hochsauerland district, North Rhine-Westphalia, Rothaar
35. Stüppel (732 m), Hochsauerland district, Rothaar
36. Sperrenberg (725 m), Hochsauerland district, Sauerland
37. Istenberg (721 m), Hochsauerland district, Sauerland
38. Heidkopf (Olsberg) (715.1 m), Hochsauerland district, Rothaar
39. Saukopf (715 m), Hochsauerland district, Rothaar
40. Rimberg (Schmallenberg) (713 m), Hochsauerland district, Rothaar
41. Kahlenberg (712 m), Hochsauerland district, Rothaar
42. Kahleberg (711 m), Hochsauerland district, Rothaar
43. Heidkopf (Hallenberg) (703.8 m), Hochsauerland district, Rothaar
44. Olsberg (703.2 m), Hochsauerland district, Rothaar
45. Beieck (695 m), Hochsauerland district, Sauerland
46. Kompass (Rothaar) (693.9 m), Siegen-Wittgenstein district, Rothaar
47. Weißer Stein (692 m / 689 m on the North Rhine-Westphalian side), Euskirchen district, Zitter Forest/North Eifel
48. Ebschloh (686.3 m), Siegen-Wittgenstein district, Rothaar
49. Westerberg (684.6 m), Olpe district, Rothaar
50. Riemen (678 m), Siegen-Wittgenstein district, Rothaar
51. Jagdberg (Netphen) (675.9 m), Siegen-Wittgenstein district, Rothaar
52. Oberste Henn (675.9 m), Siegen-Wittgenstein district, Rothaar
53. Milfen (670 m), ??? district, Rothaar
54. Milsenberg (670 m), Olpe district, Rothaar
55. Borberg (669 m), Hochsauerland district, Briloner Höhen
56. Nordhelle (Ebbegebirge) (663.3 m), Mark district, Ebbegebirge
57. Kleine Bamicke (659.8 m), Hochsauerland district, Rothaar
58. Steling (658 m), Aachen district, Rur Eifel
59. Wilzenberg (658), Hochsauerland district, Rothaar
60. Homert (1) (656 m), Hochsauerland district, Lenne Uplands
61. Hoher Wald (655 m), Siegen-Wittgenstein district, Rothaar
62. Giller (653.5 m), Siegen-Wittgenstein district, Rothaar
63. Schurenstein (650 m), Hochsauerland district, Sauerland
64. Ederkopf (649 m), Siegen-Wittgenstein district, Rothaar
65. Schomberg (648 m), Hochsauerland district, Lenne Uplands
66. Rehberg (646 m), Olpe district, Ebbegebirge
67. Aukopf (644.9 m), Siegen-Wittgenstein district, Rothaar
68. Stein (644 m), Siegen-Wittgenstein district, Rothaar
69. Rammelsberg (637.2 m above NN), Siegen-Wittgenstein district, Rothaar
70. Jagdberg (Erndtebrück) (634.5 m), Siegen-Wittgenstein district, Rothaar
71. Homberg (630 m), Siegen-Wittgenstein district, Rothaar
72. Röhrenspring (629 m), Hochsauerland district, Rothaar
73. Hölzenberg (626 m), ??? district, Rothaar
74. Lahnkopf (624.9 m), Siegen-Wittgenstein district, Rothaar
75. Bilstein (620 m), Hochsauerland district, Brilon Heights
76. Kindelsberg (617.9 m), Siegen-Wittgenstein district, Rothaar
77. Nenkersberg (610 m), Siegen-Wittgenstein district, Westerwald
78. Eisenberg (606 m), Hochsauerland district, Brilon Heights
79. Kuhelle (603 m), Olpe district, Rothaar
80. Rothenstein (600 m), Mark district, Ebbegebirge
81. Iberg (596 m), Hochsauerland district, Sauerland
82. Die Burg, (591 m), Siegen-Wittgenstein, Rothaar / Westerwald
83. Michelsberg (588 m), Euskirchen district, Ahr Hills, Eifel
84. Hohe Bracht (587.9 m), Olpe district
85. Unnamed peak (581.5 m), near Meschede-Eversbergs, Soest district, Arnsberg Forest
86. Wilde Wiese (580 m), Hochsauerland district, Rothaar
87. Kalteiche (579.3 m), Siegen-Wittgenstein, Rothaar
88. Weiße Frau (572 m), Hochsauerland district, Brilon Heights
89. Donnerhain (560 m), Siegen-Wittgenstein district, Rothaar
90. Unnamed peak (559.5 m), near Brilon-Esshofs, ??? district, Arnsberg Forest Nature Park
91. Unnamed peak near the Meschede TV tower (557.4 m), Hochsauerland district, Arnsberg Forest Nature Park
92. Warsteiner Kopf (556.9 m), Hochsauerland district, Arnsberg Forest Nature Park
93. Der Griesing (555 m), Mark district, Ebbegebirge
94. Gemeinheitskopf (551.9 m), Hochsauerland district, Arnsberg Forest Nature Park
95. Tiefenrother Höhe (551 m), Siegen-Wittgenstein district, Rothaar
96. Unnamed peak (550.8 m), near Meschede and the "B 55", Hochsauerland district, Arnsberg Forest Nature Park
97. Niekopf (550.4 m), Soest district, Arnsberg Forest Nature Park
98. Ebberg (546.9 m), ??? district, Arnsberg Forest Nature Park
99. Balve Forest (545.9 m), Mark district, Rothaar
100. Ensterknick (543.2 m), Hochsauerland district, Arnsberg Forest Nature Park
101. Nuttlar Heights (Nuttlarer Höhe) (542.2 m), Hochsauerland district, Arnsberg Forest Nature Park
102. Stimm Stamm (541.1 m), Passhöhe, Soest district and Hochsauerland district, Arnsberg Forest Nature Park
103. Homert (2) (539 m), Mark district, Ebbegebirge
104. Kahler Kopf (539 m), Mark district, Ebbegebirge
105. Knippberg (537 m), ??? district, Ahr Hills, Eifel
106. Heimberg (536 m), Hochsauerland district, Briloner Höhen
107. Sengenberg (530.4 m), Soest district, Arnsberg Forest Nature Park
108. Bornstein (529 m), Hochsauerland district, Sauerland
109. Walkersdorfer Berg (526 m), Siegen-Wittgenstein district, Rothaar
110. Wildbretshügel (525 m), Euskirchen district/Düren district, Rur Eifel/Kermeter
111. Wehberg (525 m), Soest district, Arnsberg Forest Nature Park
112. Liverhagen (522.6 m), Hochsauerland district, Arnsberg Forest Nature Park
113. Moosberg (522.0 m), ??? district, Arnsberg Forest Nature Park
114. Voßstein (521.1 m; nordöstlicher Kopf), ??? district, Arnsberg Forest Nature Park
115. Hornscheid (519.7 m), Hochsauerland district, Arnsberg Forest Nature Park
116. Voßstein (519.7 m; mittlerer Kopf), ??? district, Arnsberg Forest Nature Park
117. Homert (3) (519 m), Upper Berg district, Bergisches Land
118. Silberkuhle (515 m), Upper Berg district, Bergisches Land
119. Greverhagen (514.6 m), Hochsauerland district, Arnsberg Forest Nature Park
120. Kopnück (514 m), Euskirchen district, Ahr Hills, Eifel
121. Bautenberg (512.9 m), Siegen-Wittgenstein district, Rothaar
122. Voßstein (512.3 m; southwestern peak), ??? district, Arnsberg Forest Nature Park
123. Brandenberg (509.3 m), Soest district, Arnsberg Forest Nature Park
124. Unnenberg (506 m), Marienheide, Upper Berg district, Bergisches Land
125. Heinberg (504.9 m), ??? district, Arnsberg Forest Nature Park
126. Neuer Berg (504.2 m), ??? district, Arnsberg Forest Nature Park
127. Wennemer Höhe (503.3 m), Hochsauerland district, Arnsberg Forest Nature Park
128. Totenkopf (502.6 m), Hochsauerland district, near Marsberg
129. Kohlberg (502 m), Mark district
130. Kopf (500.8 m), ??? district, Arnsberg Forest Nature Park
131. Blumenkopf (500.7 m), ??? district, Arnsberg Forest Nature Park
132. Schaaken (500 m), Hochsauerland district, Briloner Höhen
133. Pfannenberg (499.2 m), Siegen-Wittgenstein district, Rothaar
134. Suhrenberg (498.2 m), ??? district, Arnsberg Forest Nature Park
135. Köterberg (496 m; Monte Wau-Wau), Lippe district, Weser Uplands, border of North Rhine-Westphalia and Lower Saxony
136. Schälhorn (493 m), Hochsauerland district, Brilon Heights
137. Kahlenbergsköpfe (485.7 m southern peak), Soest district, Arnsberg Forest Nature Park
138. Schellberg (472 m), Hochsauerland district, Brilon Heights
139. Wildenberg (468.7 m), Siegen-Wittgenstein district, Rothaar
140. Preußischer Velmerstot (468 m), Paderborn district, Eggegebirge
141. Kahlenbergsköpfe (466.9 m mittlerer Kopf), Soest district, Arnsberg Forest Nature Park
142. Tüppel (461 m), Soest district, Arnsberg Forest Nature Park
143. Großer Ölberg (460 m), Rhine-Sieg district, Siebengebirge
144. Löwenburg (455 m), Rhine-Sieg district, Siebengebirge
145. Schiffenberg (452.6 m), Siegen-Wittgenstein district, Rothaar
146. Hoheloh (451 m), ??? district, Sindfeld
147. Kahlenbergsköpfe (447.5 m nördlicher Kopf), Soest district, Arnsberg Forest Nature Park
148. Barnacken (446 m), Lippe district, Teutoburg Forest
149. Elkersberg (443.2 m), Siegen-Wittgenstein district, Rothaar
150. Kleine Rausche (443.1 m), Siegen-Wittgenstein district, Rothaar
151. Wengeberg (442 m), Ennepe-Ruhr district, Breckerfeld, highest elevation in the Ruhr
152. Hausheide (441 m), Höxter district, Eggegebirge, near Bad Driburg
153. Lippischer Velmerstot (441 m), Lippe district, Eggegebirge
154. Große Rausche (436.9 m), Siegen-Wittgenstein district, Rothaar
155. Lohrberg (435 m), Rhine-Sieg district, Siebengebirge
156. Hirseberg (434 m), ??? district, Sindfeld
157. Hohlestein (433 m), Lippe district, Teutoburg Forest
158. Leyenkopf (431.5 m), Siegen-Wittgenstein district, Rothaar
159. Padberg (426 m), Lippe district, Teutoburg Forest
160. Küppel (422.6 m), ??? district, Arnsberg Forest Nature Park
161. Unnamed peak (285.8 m), near Möhnesee-Delecke, ??? district, Arnsberg Forest Nature Park
162. Langenberg (418 m), Lippe district, Teutoburg Forest
163. Püsterberg (410 m), Soest district, Arnsberg Forest Nature Park
164. Stemberg (402 m), Lippe district, Teutoburg Forest
165. Burgberg, (400.5 m), Düren district, North Eifel
166. Piusberg (399 m), Soest district, Arnsberg Forest Nature Park
167. Stillenbergskopf (399 m), Soest district, Arnsberg Forest Nature Park
168. Markberg (394 m), Lippe district, Teutoburg Forest
169. Sonnenberg (393.3 m), Düren district, Rur Eifel/Hausener Busch
170. Bielstein (393 m), Lippe district, Teutoburg Forest
171. Spitze Warte (391 m), Soest district, Haarstrang
172. Hoher Schaden (388 m), Rhine-Sieg district, Westerwald
173. Teutberg (386 m), Lippe district, Teutoburg Forest
174. Heckberg (383 m), Rhine-Sieg district, Bergisches Land
175. Iburg (380 m), Höxter district, Eggegebirge, near Bad Driburg
176. Brodtberg (378.86 m), Remscheid, Bergisches Land
177. Hohes Wäldchen (378 m), Rhine-Sieg district, Bergisches Land
178. Stahlseifer Kopf (375.8 m), Siegen-Wittgenstein district, Rothaar
179. Butterberg (372 m), Soest district, Arnsberg Forest Nature Park
180. Hellerberg (366.9 m), Siegen-Wittgenstein district, Rothaar
181. Hermannsberg (364 m; also called Großer Hermannsberg), Lippe district, Teutoburg Forest
182. Eisenberg (361 m), Soest district, Arnsberg Forest Nature Park
183. Lichtscheid (351 m), Wuppertal
184. Kleiner Heckberg (348 m), Rhine-Berg district, Bergisches Land
185. Wehlhügel (346 m), Soest district, Haarstrang
186. Desenberg (343.6 m), Höxter district, Warburg Börde
187. Bonstapel (342 m), Herford district, Weser Uplands
188. Großer Ehberg (340 m), ??? district, Teutoburg Forest
189. Nonnenstromberg (335 m), Rhine-Sieg district, Siebengebirge
190. Tönsberg (333.4 m), Lippe district, Teutoburg Forest
191. Petersberg (331 m), Rhine-Sieg district, Siebengebirge
192. Scharpenacker Berg (326.3 m), Wuppertal
193. Wolkenburg (324 m), Rhine-Sieg district, Siebengebirge
194. Drachenfels (321 m), Rhine-Sieg district, Siebengebirge
195. Vaalserberg (322.50 m), Germany-Belgium-Netherlands border, Aachen Forest
196. Heidbrink (319.6 m), Minden-Lübbecke district, Wiehen Hills
197. Hengeberg (316 m), Gütersloh district, Teutoburg Forest
198. Große Egge (312 m), Gütersloh district, Teutoburg Forest
199. Ebberg / Eiserner Anton (309 m), town of Bielefeld, Teutoburg Forest
200. Hankenüll (307 m), Gütersloh district, on the border between Lower Saxony and North Rhine-Westphalia, Teutoburg Forest
201. Bußberg (306 m), Gütersloh district, Teutoburg Forest
202. Hollandskopf (306 m), Gütersloh district, Teutoburg Forest
203. Teutberg (305.3 m), Lippe district
204. Hünenburg (302 m), Bielefeld, Teutoburg Forest
205. Johannisberg (291 m), Gütersloh district, Teutoburg Forest
206. Sophienhöhe (290 m), Düren district, a slag heap
207. Nettelstedter Berg (289 m), Minden-Lübbecke district, Wiehen Hills
208. Burggrafenberg (282.8 m), Wuppertal, Staatsforst Burgholz
209. Wittekindsberg (281.48 m), Porta Westfalica, Wiehen Hills
210. Auf dem Heil (274 m), Ennepe-Ruhr district, Ardey Hills
211. Nonnenstein (274 m), on the border between Herford and Minden-Lübbecke districts, Wiehen Hills
212. Arenberg (269 m), Ennepe-Ruhr district, Witten
213. Lousberg (264 m), Aachen
214. Lüderich (260.2 m), Rhine-Berg district
215. Klusenberg (254 m), Dortmund, Ardey Hills, highest hill on Dortmund city territory
216. Syberg (244 m), Dortmund, Ardey Hills
217. Höstreichberg (243 m), Ennepe-Ruhr district
218. Höhensteine (236 m), Rhine-Sieg district, Leuscheid
219. Böllberg (236 m), Ennepe-Ruhr district
220. Westerbecker Berg (236 m), Steinfurt district
221. Harkortberg (232 m), Ennepe-Ruhr district, Ardey Hills
222. Glessener Höhe (204 m), highest point in Rhein-Erft district, Ville ridge
223. Halde Oberscholven (201.8 m), Gelsenkirchen, Bergehalde
224. Ibbenbüren-Dickenberg (201 m) Ibbenbüren Steinfurt district (Bergehalde)
225. Unnamed peak (193 m) in Bochum-Stiepel, western extension of the Ardey Hills, highest hill in the city of Bochum
226. Maschberg (190.2 m), Herford district
227. Ichenberg (190 m), Aachen district
228. Limberg (190 m), Minden-Lübbecke district
229. Westerberg (187 m), Coesfeld district, Baumberge
230. Kaisberg (185 m), Ennepe-Ruhr district
231. Brasberg (185 m), Ennepe-Ruhr district
232. Stever Berge (182 m), Coesfeld district, Baumberge
233. Stemweder Berg (181 m), Minden-Lübbecke district, Stemme Hills
234. Schafberg (Ibbenbüren) (174 m), Steinfurt district
235. Mackenberg (173 m), Warendorf district, Beckum Hills
236. Rennenberg (164.10 m), Ruppichteroth
237. Dörenther Klippen (159 m), Steinfurt district, Teutoburg Forest
238. Schöppinger Berg (157.6 m), Borken district
239. Stimberg (156 m), Recklinghausen district, the Haard
240. Halde Großes Holz (150 m), Unna district, Bergehalde
241. Waldbeerenberg (146 m), Recklinghausen district, Hohe Mark
242. Bergelerberg (136 m), Warendorf district, Beckum Hills
243. Granatsberg (135 m), Recklinghausen district, Hohe Mark
244. Fischberg (134 m), ??? district, Borkenberge
245. Ostenberg (126 m), ??? district, Stemme Hills
246. Halde Haniel (126 m), Bottrop, Bergehalde
247. Weseler Berg (126 m), Recklinghausen district, the Haard
248. Dachsberg (123 m), Recklinghausen district, the Haard
249. Galgenberg (123 m), Recklinghausen district, Hohe Mark
250. Stuckenberg (118 m), Unna district, Unna-Massen
251. Monte Troodelöh (118 m), Köln, Königsforst
252. Maiberg (109 m), ??? district, Hohe Mark
253. Hammerberg (106 m), Recklinghausen district, the Haard
254. Kurricker Berg (102 m), Stadt Hamm in the borough of Bockum-Hövel
255. Halde Norddeutschland (102 m), Neukirchen-Vluyn, Bergehalde
256. Tannenbülten (100 m), ??? district, Die Berge
257. Klever Berg (99 m), Kleve district, Kleve
258. Michaelsberg (118 m), Rhine-Sieg district
259. Inrather Berg (87 m), Krefeld
260. Kapuzinerberg (77 m), Krefeld
261. Kaiserberg (75 m), Duisburg
262. Fürstenberg (75 m), Xanten
263. Oermter Berg (68 m), between Rheurdt and Issum
264. Hülser Berg (63 m), Krefeld

== See also ==
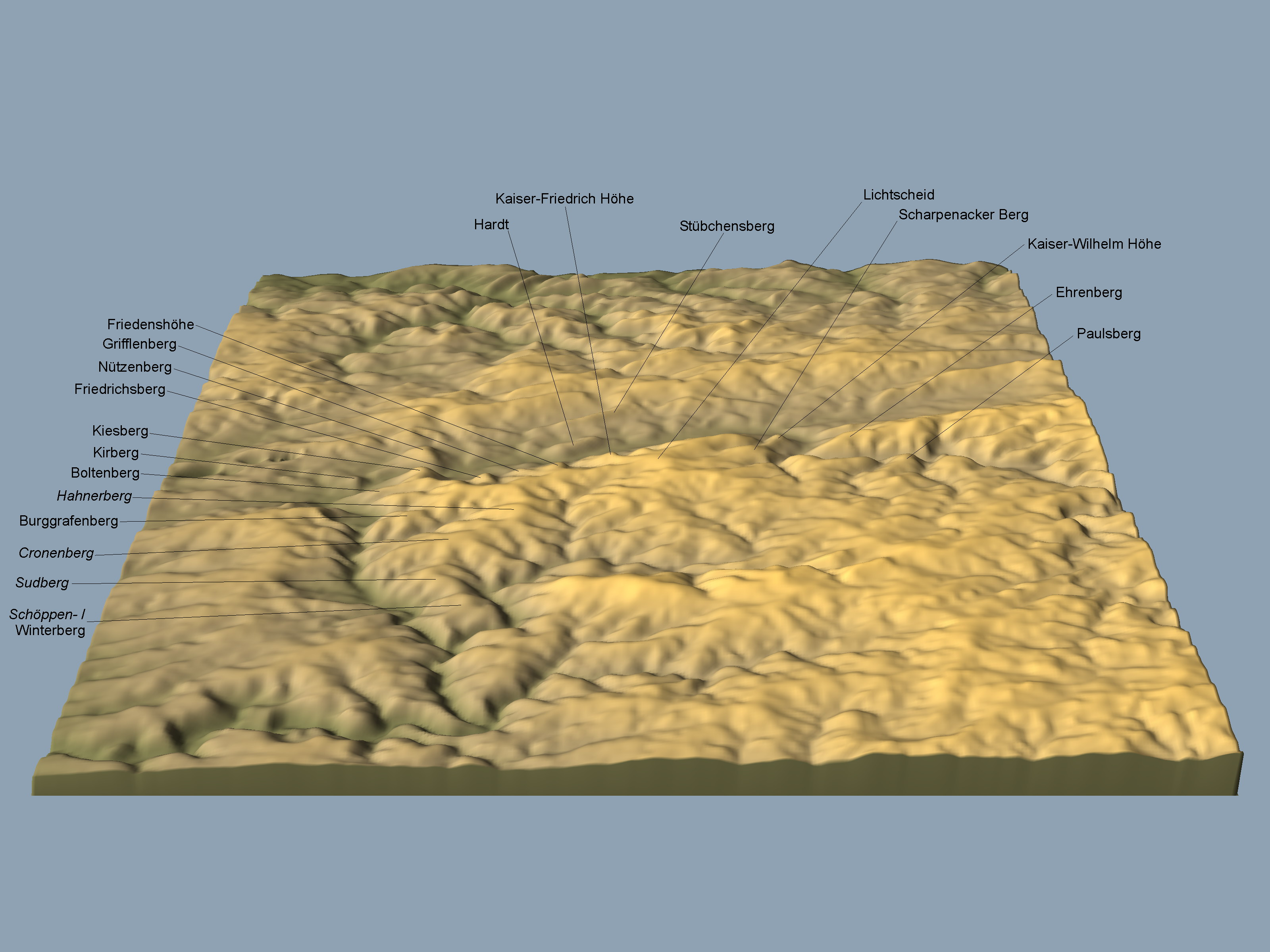
View over the Wuppertal Hills

- List of the highest mountains in Germany
- List of mountain and hill ranges in Germany
- List of hills in the Teutoburg Forest
