= List of hills in the Teutoburg Forest =

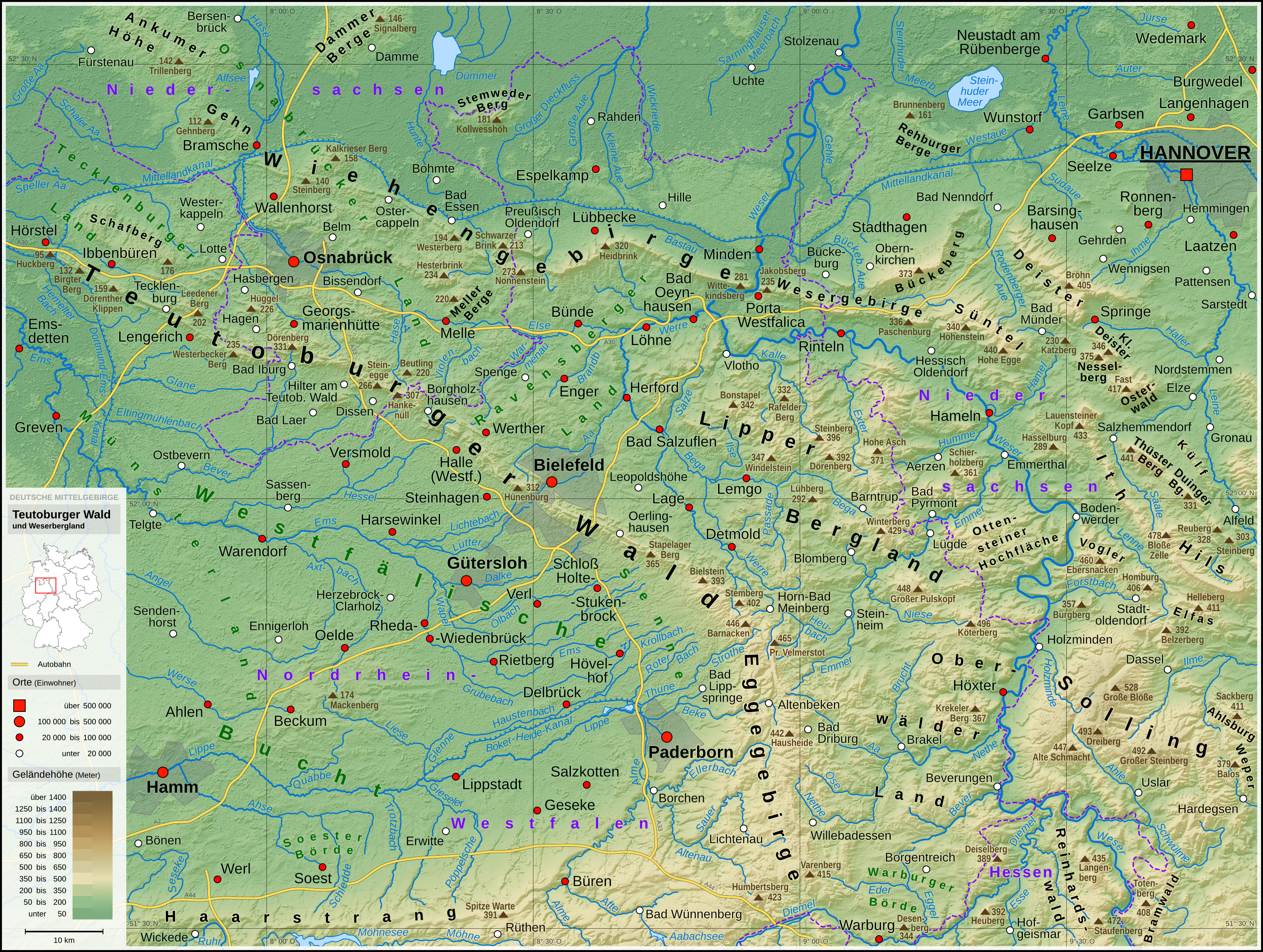
Topographic map of the Teutoburg Forest and the Weser Uplands

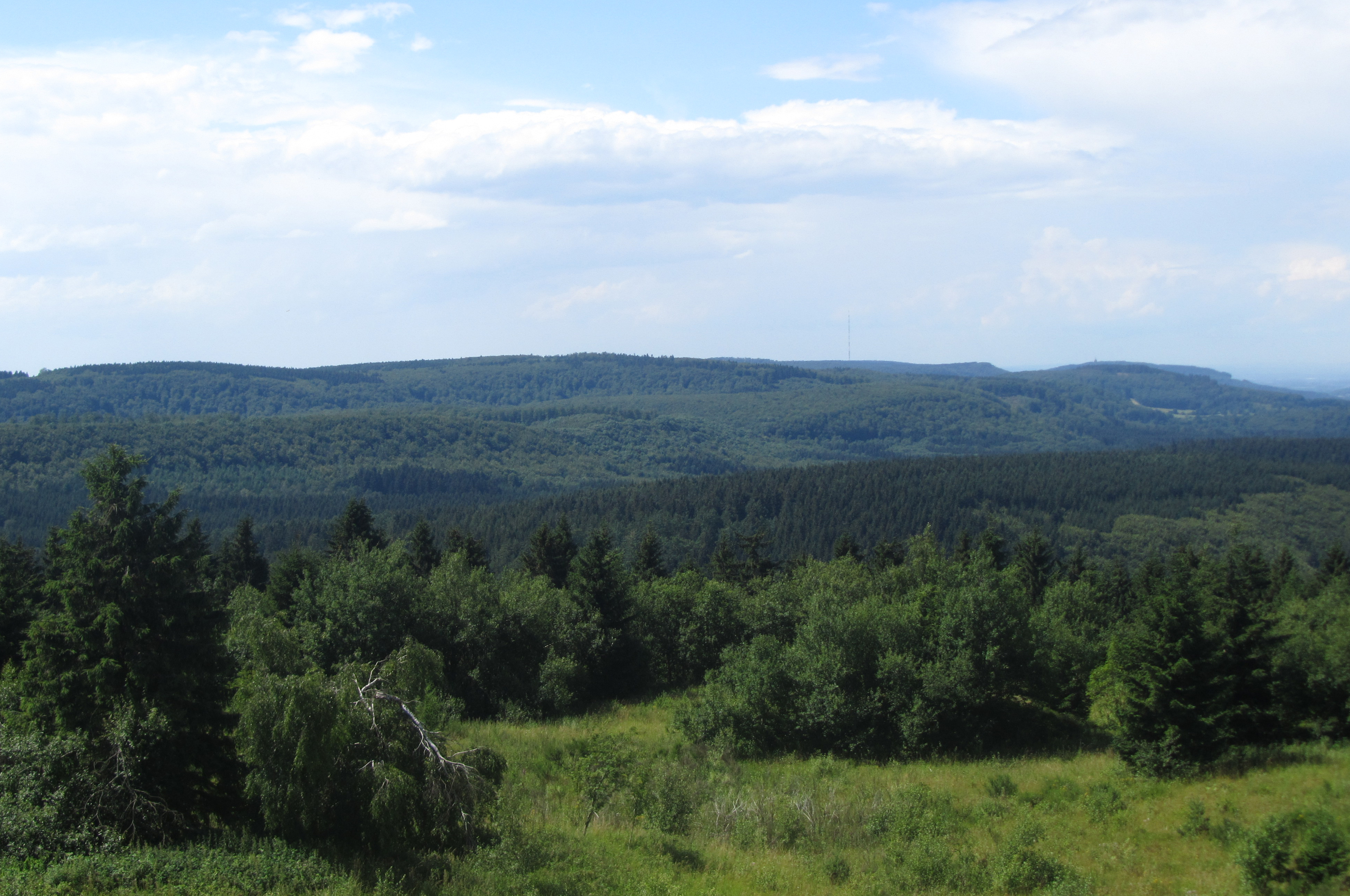
The Barnacken (centre), highest point in the Teutoburg Forest, seen from the Egge Tower

This list of hills in the Teutoburg Forest records a selection of the hills, elevations and foothills (some are only high points on the crest of the ridge) in the Teutoburg Forest and its foothills, a hill chain in the German states of North Rhine-Westphalia and Lower Saxony. Several belong to the Iburg Forest (a hill ridge near Bad Iburg) or the Lippe Forest (Lippischer Wald) (southeastern part of the chain), most however are considered part of the Western Egge Foreland in the transition region to the Egge Hills (Eggegebirge) – a continuation of the hill chain to the southeast.

Most of the hills of in the Teutoburg Forest lie in North Rhine-Westphalia ("NW"), those in Lower Saxony ("NI") and others on the border between the two states are indicated by the relevant abbreviations. The list is sorted by height in metres (m) above sea level (NN; unless otherwise stated, based on; more rarely or):

- Barnacken (446.1 m), Horn-Bad Meinberg-Holzhausen; Lippe Forest
  - Padberg (437.5 m), Schlangen-Kohlstädt
    - Schierenberg (410 m), Schlangen-Kohlstädt
  - Mordkopf (408.6 m), Horn-Bad Meinberg-Holzhausen
  - Kleiner Rigi (387.7 m), Horn-Bad Meinberg-Holzhausen
  - Kartoffelberg (ca. 385 m), Horn-Bad Meinberg-Holzhausen
- Eggeberg (437.0 m), Horn-Bad Meinberg-Veldrom (also: Western Egge Foreland)
  - Bielstein (409.0 m), Horn-Bad Meinberg-Veldrom
    and the nearby Skilift
- Hohlestein (433.2 m), Schlangen-Kohlstädt
  and the Hohlstein Cave (also: Western Egge Foreland)
  - Ebersberg (401 m), Horn-Bad Meinberg-Veldrom
    - Markberg (ca. 394 m), Horn-Bad Meinberg-Veldrom
- Upper Langenberg (418.8 m, Horn-Bad Meinberg-Holzhausen; Lippe Forest
  - Unterer Langenberg (386 m), Detmold-Berlebeck
    - Warmsberg (392.8 m), Detmold-Berlebeck; Lippe Forest
    - Stiensberg (ca. 390 m), Detmold-Berlebeck
- Düsterlau (417.4 m), Berlebeck-Johannaberg (Detmold); Lippe Forest
  - Kortewebelshals (385.5 m), Johannaberg
  - Großer Gauseköterberg (366.7 m), Johannaberg
- Stemberg (401.9 m), Horn-Bad Meinberg-Holzhausen
  and the nearby ruins of Falkenburg Castle (Detmold); Lippe Forest
  - Falkenberg (345.2 m), Horn-Bad Meinberg-Holzhausen
- Bielstein (393.6 m), Detmold-Hiddesen
  and the Grundnetzsender Teutoburg Forest; Lippe Forest
  - Klöppingsberg (393.4 m), Detmold-Heiligenkirchen/Schling
  - Kanzel (351 m), Hiddesen
    - Uffler (290.9 m), Hiddesen
      and the nearby natural monument of Mordkuhle
    - Scharfnacken (281.0 m), Hiddesen
      - Sternschanze (234.7 m), Hiddesen
- Grotenburg (or: Teutberg; 386 m), Detmold-Hiddesen
  and Hermann’s Monument and hillfort; Lippe Forest
  - Altarstein (ca. 356 m), Hiddesen
  - Hellberg (346.8 m), Detmold-Heiligenkirchen/Schling
- Buchenberg (ca. 385 m), Horn-Bad Meinberg-Veldrom (also: Western Egge Foreland)
- Stapelager Berg (365.2 m), Lage-Hörste; Lippe Forest
- Knieberg (365.1 m), Horn-Bad Meinberg
- Hermannsberg (or: Großer Hermannsberg; 363.7 m), Lage-Hörste; Lippe Forest
  - Hörster Berg (315,1 m), Hörste
  - Esbatzen (278,4 m), Hörste
    - Kleiner Ehberg (216.5 m), Detmold-Pivitsheide V. L.
- Großer Ehberg (339.6 m), Detmold-Pivitsheide V. L.
  - Allhornberg (316 m), Pivitsheide V. H.
- Tönsberg (336.9 m), Oerlinghausen; Lippe Forest
  and the Hünenkapelle, Sachsenlager, Löns Monument, memorial to the fallen of the 1st World War, Kumsttonne windmill base.
- Dörenberg (331.2 m), NI, Georgsmarienhütte; Iburg Forest
  u. a. and the Hermann’s Tower (observation tower), Bennosteinbruch and Bäumker Chapel
- Huneckenkammer (325.7 m), Oerlinghausen; Lippe Forest
  - Mämerich (310.2 m), Oerlinghausen
    - Ravensberg (304.0 m), Oerlinghausen
- Hohe Warte (325.0 m), Detmold-Berlebeck; Lippe Forest
- Auf dem Polle (320.4 m), Bielefeld-Stieghorst/Lämershagen
  - Lewenberg (312.6 m), Lämershagen
  - Eisgrundsberg (268.9 m), Bielefeld-Stieghorst/Lämershagen
- Bärenstein (317.6 m), Horn-Bad Meinberg-Holzhausen
  and the nearby Externsteine
- Hengeberg (315.7 m), Halle/Werther
- Knickenhagen (ca. 314.1 m), Horn-Bad Meinberg
  and the nearby Externsteine
- Grafensundern (314 m), NI, Bad Iburg; Iburg Forest
  and the transmitter site
- Hünenberg (312.5 m), between Bielefeld-Quelle and -Uerentrup
  with the Bielefeld Hünenburg and Hünenburg Observation Tower
  - Jostberg (285.7 m), between Quelle and Uerentrup
  - Sennberg (282.2 m), Uerentrup
- Große Egge (312.1 m), Halle
  with its closed microwave tower
- Ebberg (309.5 m), between Bielefeld-Buschkamp and -Hillegossen
  with its Bielefeld Bismarck Tower, called the "Iron Anthony" (Eisernem Anton), an observation tower.
  - Bokelberg (264.8 m), Buschkamp / Hillegossen
  - Jostmeiers Berg (260.5 m), Buschkamp / Hillegossen
    and the Zwergen Cave
- Hankenüll (307.1 m), NW / NI, between Borgholzhausen and Dissen
  - Ascher Egge (284 m), NI, Dissen
  - Steinbrink (ca. 209 m), NI, Dissen
- Hollandskopf (306.6 m), Borgholzhausen
  and the nature reserve of Johannisegge–Schornstein
  - Schornstein (ca. 273 m), Borgholzhausen
  - Vicarienkopf (ca. 270 m), Borgholzhausen
- Bußberg (306.2 m), between Bielefeld-Kirchdornberg and Steinhagen-Amshausen
  and the Schwedenschanze near Dornberg
  - Petersberg (266 m), Kirchdornberg / Amshausen
- Rosenberg (301.6 m), Bielefeld-Brackwede
- Palsterkamper Berg (295.1 m), between Bielefeld-Großdornberg and Steinhagen-Rote Erde
- Togdrang (293.8 m), Bielefeld-Sieker and -Buschkamp
  - Kettlersche Berge (283.6 m), Sieker and Buschkamp
- Barkhauser Berge (292.6 m), Oerlinghausen
- Johannisegge (293.0 m), Borgholzhausen
  and the Luise Tower (observation tower)
- Hellegrundsberg (276.0 m), Bielefeld-Stieghorst/Lämershagen
- Menkhauser Berg (ca. 271 m), Oerlinghausen
  - Steinbült (261.4 m), between Oerlinghausen and Oerlinghausen-Lipperreihe
    and the 492-metre-long tunnel of the Landesstraße 751n (Oerlinghausen–Lipperreihe section)
- Barenberg (269.2 m), between Borgholzhausen and Hesseln
  and nearby Ravensberg Castle
- Großer Freeden (269 m), NI, Bad Iburg
  - Kleiner Freeden (200 m), NI, Bad Iburg
- Käseberg (266.9 m), Bielefeld-Brackwede
- Steinegge (ca. 266 m), NI, Dissen
  and the Fernmeldeturm Dissen (with its observation platform)
  - Schollegge (255.4 m), NI, Dissen
    - Petersbrink (ca. 212 m), NI, Dissen
  - Sahlbrink (ca. 244 m), NI, Dissen
    - Rechenberg (ca. 206 m), NI, Dissen
      - Steinbrink (ca. 200 m), NI, Dissen
- Ubbedisser Berg (266.0 m), between Bielefeld-Ubbedissen and Oerlinghausen
- Hochholz (264 m), NI, Georgsmarienhütte-Oesede; Iburg Forest
- Gottesberg (ca. 263 m), between Bielefeld-Kirchdornberg and Steinhagen-Amshausen
- Hohnangel (ca. 262 m), NW / NI, between Hilter and Dissen
  - Hülsberg (ca. 254 m), NI, Hilter
- Musenberg (ca. 256 m), NI, Georgsmarienhütte-Dröper
- Knüll (253.5 m), Halle
  with the nature reserve of Knüll – Storkenberg incl. the Kaffeemühle observation tower and two nearby monuments
  - Storkenberg (ca. 234.0 m), Halle
- Timmer Egge (ca. 254 m), NI, Hilter
  - Asberg (ca. 244 m), NI, Hilter
- Kahler Berg (248.3 m), between Bielefeld-Bethel and -Uerentrup
  and the nearby Olderdissen Wildlife Park and Bielefeld Botanical Garden
- Baumannsknollen (245.0 m), NI, Georgsmarienhütte; Iburg Forest
  - Lammersbrink (191.9 m), NI, Georgsmarienhütte
    and the Varusturm
- Hohnsberg (242 m), NI, Bad Iburg
- Westerbecker Berg (235 m), Lienen
- Hüggel (226 m), NI, between Hasbergen, Hagen and Georgsmarienhütte
- Zedling (225.7 m), Detmold-Hiddesen; Lippe Forest
  - Kahler Ehberg (224.1 m), Hiddesen
  - Kupferberg (197 m), Detmold-Heidenoldendorf
- Beutling (ca. 220 m), Melle-Wellingholzhausen
  with the nature reserve of Beutling and observation tower
- Lönkerberg (ca. 220 m), between Bielefeld-Brackwede and Gadderbaum
- Urberg (218.1 m), NI, Bad Iburg
- Hohe Liet (217.5 m), Steinhagen-Amshausen
- Jacobsberg (216.7 m), Steinhagen-Amshausen
- Kleiner Berg (ca. 208 m), NI, between Bad Laer, Bad Rothenfelde and Hilter
  with its observation tower
- Leedener Berg (202.4 m), Tecklenburg-Leeden
- Johannisberg (197.0 m), Bielefeld
- Limberg (194.3 m), NI, Bad Iburg
  (crash site of Zeppelin LZ 7, 1910)
- Dörenther Klippen (159 m), Ibbenbüren
- Hagenberg, NI, (139.2 m), Bad Iburg
- Birgter Berg (131.8 m), Hörstel-Birgte
- Riesenbecker Berg (133.5 m), Hörstel-Riesenbeck
  - Lagerberg (128.2 m) Hörstel-Riesenbeck
  - Bergeshöveder Berg (118.2 m), Hörstel-Riesenbeck
- Huckberg (95.2 m), Hörstel-Bevergern
  northwestern end of the Teutoburg Forest
- Waldhügel (90.4 m) in Rheine
- Thieberg (Neuenkirchener Berg; 83.5 m), between Rheine and Neuenkirchen
- Thieberg 68.6 m), Rheine
  with its Hünenborg memorial

== Details not fully known ==
The details of the following hills in the range are not yet complete:

- Mielberg (251 m), Bielefeld-Dornberg
- Stadtberg, in Rheine

== See also ==
- List of mountains and hills of Lower Saxony
- List of mountains and hills of North Rhine-Westphalia
