= Padberg =

Padberg may refer to:

- Padberg, Marsberg, a district of the town Marsberg in North Rhine-Westphalia, Germany
- Padberg (Teutoburg Forest), spur of the Barnacken hill in the Teutoburg Forest, North Rhine-Westphalia, Germany
- Lutz von Padberg (b. 1950), German historian whose specialty is medieval history
- Eva Padberg (b. 1980), German fashion model, singer, and actress
