= Worringer Bruch =

Coordinates: 51°2′49.2″N 6°51′31.8″E

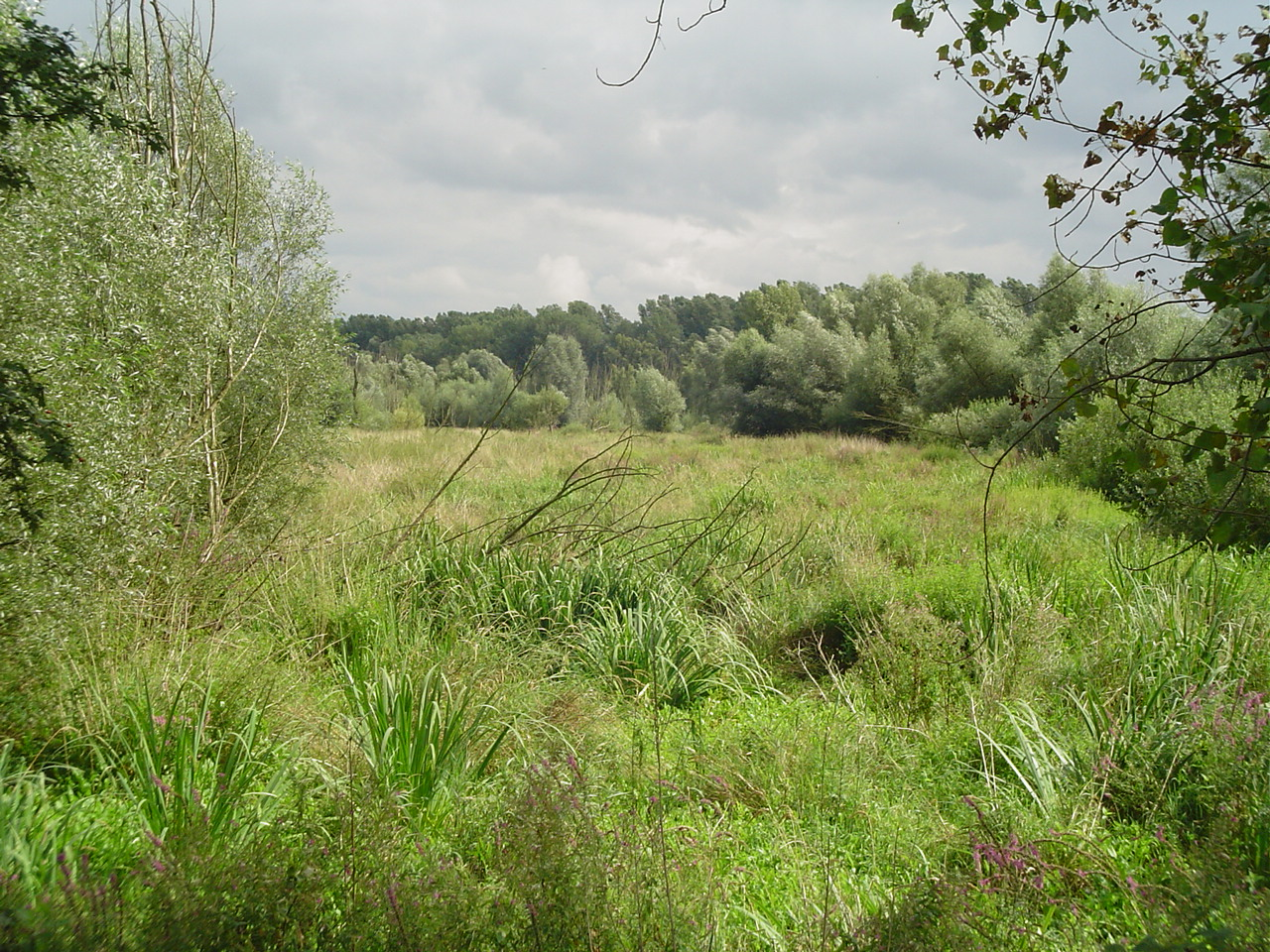
Worringer Bruch

The Worringer Bruch is a section of 164 hectares (410 acres) swampy lowlands in the far north of Cologne, Germany. It is approximately 8,000 years old, and is now almost a completely dried up meander part of the Rhine. It was named after an adjacent district of Cologne, Worringen, which once was an independent city, which has a thousand years of history (first mentioned in 922).

The Worringer Bruch is geographically 37.5 m above sea level, and is the lowest point of Cologne (the highest is 118.3 m – Monte Troodelöh in Königsforst). The water level is closely related to the water level of the river Rhine. Today, Worringer Bruch offers shelter for different types of forest and cultural landscapes such as pastures and orchards, the most important being the floodplain landscape. In addition, Worringer Bruch serves as a valuable regional habitat for several endangered plants and animal species.

Playing an essential role in the conservation and protection of nature, rare animals and plant species, it also serves as the "green lungs" of Cologne. It is also a notable area for recreation and nature experience such as hiking, and flora and fauna exploration. In 1991, the Worringer Bruch was designated as a nature reserve.

== Fauna ==
As large parts of Worringer Bruch are difficult for people to access, it is an ideal habitat for many animal and bird species, including:

- Slowworm
- Toads
- About 20 species of bats
- Nightingales
- Marsh harriers
- Black woodpeckers
- Long-eared owls
- European honey buzzards
