= Westerbecker Berg =

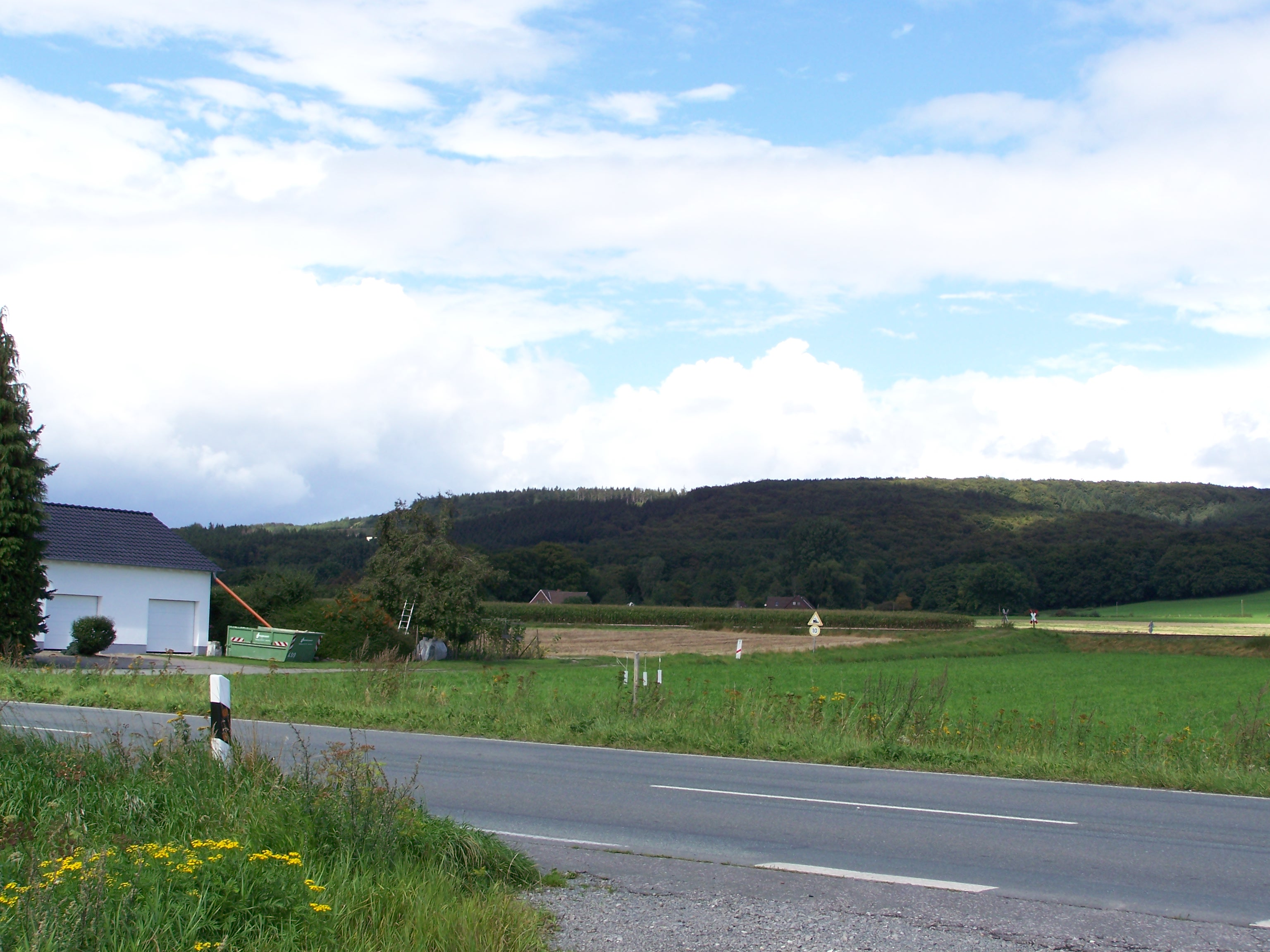
- The Westerbecker Berg from the south

Highest point
- Elevation: 236 m above sea level (NHN) (774 ft)
- Listing: Highest point in Tecklenburg Land and Steinfurt county
- Coordinates: 52°10′10″N 7°56′23″E

Geography
- Location within North Rhine-Westphalia
- Location: Lienen, North Rhine-Westphalia Germany
- Parent range: Teutoburg Forest

The Westerbecker Berg is a forested hill in the Teutoburg Forest and, at 236 m above sea level (NHN), the highest point in Tecklenburg Land, the county of Steinfurt and the administrative region of Münster in the German state of North Rhine-Westphalia.

== Location ==
The Westerbecker Berg lies in the TERRA.vita Nature Park (formerly the North Teutoburg Forest and Wiehen Hills Nature Park) in the municipality of Lienen north of the farming community of Westerbeck. To the south and southwest of the hill the terrain transitions into the Münsterland Park Landscape of Münsterland which enables very good long-distance views.

== History ==
The historical trade route known as the Hermannsweg, now a long-distance trail, runs over the Westerbecker Berg. The trail runs along the crest of the hills that form the Teutoburg Forest from Rheine to Velmerstot in the Egge.

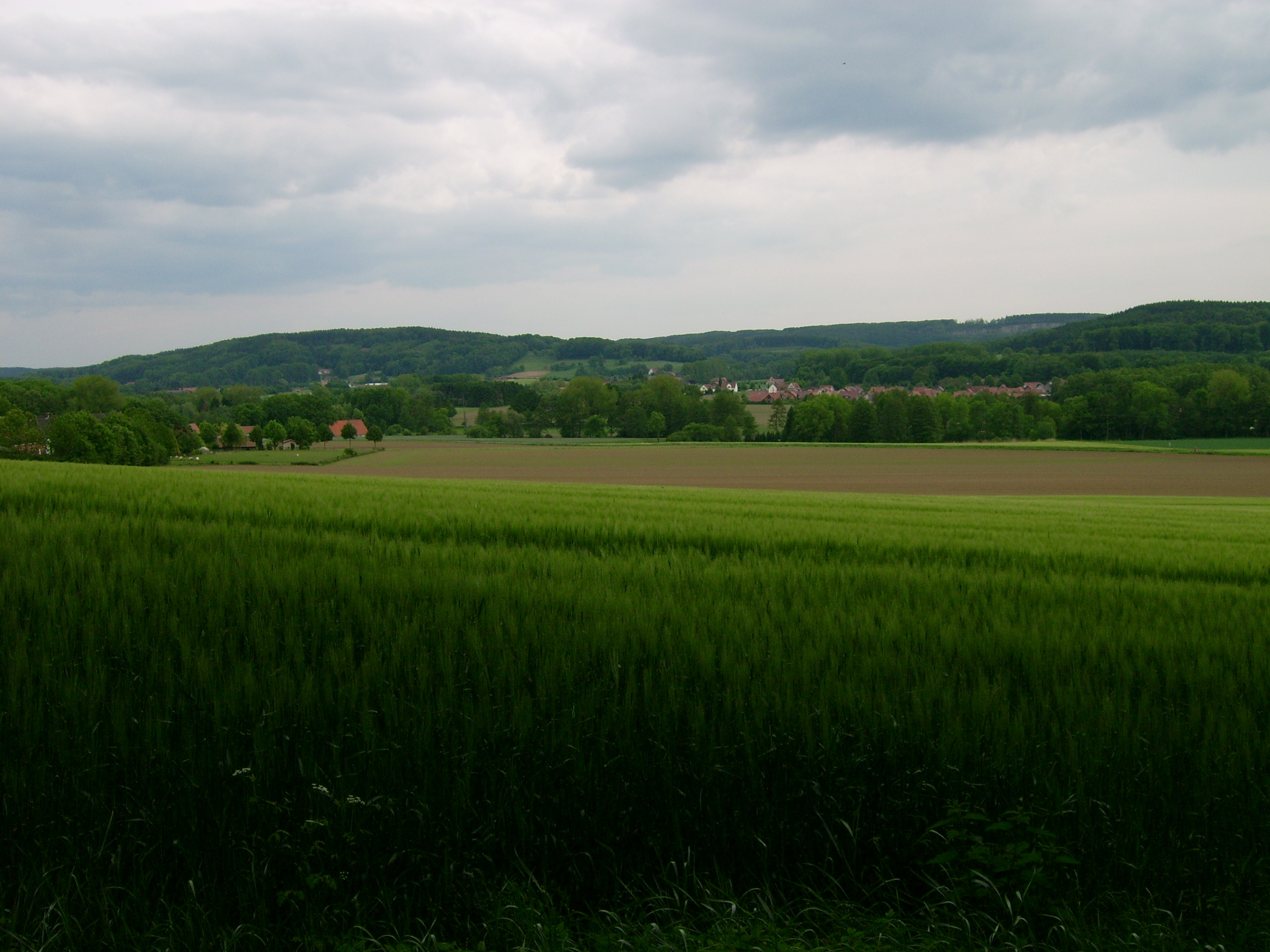
North view with former limestone quarry

Quarries on the hillsides recall the once flourishing extraction of limestone here. As a result, a cableway was built to the Hüggel, which may be seen to the north-northeast. Limestone was transported on the Hüggelbahn to the Georgsmarienhütte works and used as aggregate limestone (Zuschlagskalk).
