= Auf'm Knoll =

Mountain in Hesse, Germany

Auf´m Knoll
- Location within Hesse

Highest point
- Elevation: 739.1 m above sea level (NHN) (2,425 ft)
- Coordinates: 51°16′N 8°38′E

Geography
- Location: near Usseln; Waldeck-Frankenberg, North Hesse (Germany)
- Parent range: Upland (Rothaar)

Auf'm Knoll in the North Hessian county of Waldeck-Frankenberg, Germany is a hill, 739.1 m above sea level (NHN), in the Upland in the Rothaar mountains. Some parts of the hill belong to North Rhine-Westphalia.

== Location ==
Auf´m Knoll lies in the Upland, the northeastern foothills of the Rothaar mountains, in the wider Diemelsee Nature Park area between Titmaringhausen North Rhine-Westphalia and Usseln Hesse. The source of the river Diemel is very close to the top of the hill, around 0.7 km in northeast direction. There are also sources for the river Aarbach (0.4 km northwest) and river Wamecke (1.1 km southwest) in the closer area.

== Natural region classification ==
The Auf´m Knoll belongs to the major unit group of Süder Uplands (No. 33), the major unit of the Rothaar Mountains (with the High Sauerland) (333) and the sub-unit of the Upland (333.9). Most of it falls within the natural region of Inner Upland (333.90). Its northern and eastern slopes descend into the major unit of the East Sauerland Foothills (332) and the sub-unit of Adorf Bay (Vorupländer Adorfer Bucht, 332.6) in the natural region of Vorupland Hill Country (Vorupländer Hügelland, 332.61).
