= Steinfurt (district) =

Coordinates: 52°10′N 7°40′E

- District
- Flag Coat of arms
- Country: Germany
- State: North Rhine-Westphalia
- Adm. region: Münster
- Capital: Steinfurt

Government
  - District admin. (2020–25): Martin Sommer (Ind.)

Area
  - Total: 1,792.097 km^{2} (691.933 sq mi)

Population (31 December 2025)
  - Total: 451,004
  - Density: 251.663/km^{2} (651.803/sq mi)
- Time zone: UTC+01:00 (CET)
  - Summer (DST): UTC+02:00 (CEST)
- Vehicle registration: ST, TE, BF
- Website: www.kreis-steinfurt.de

Steinfurt (German pronunciation: [ˈʃtaɪnfʊʁt]) is a Kreis (district) in the northern part of North Rhine-Westphalia, Germany. Neighboring districts are Bentheim, Emsland, district-free Osnabrück and the Osnabrück district, Warendorf, district-free Münster, Coesfeld, Borken.

== Geography ==
The district is situated at the Lower Saxon border, north of Münster. The Ems river runs through the district from south to north. The highest point in the region is the Westerbecker Berg at 234 metres above sea level; the lowest point is Bentlage Castle at 32 metres.

== History ==
In the middle ages and early modern period, Steinfurt was an independent county of the Holy Roman Empire. In 1806, it became part of the Grand Duchy of Berg and in 1815 it became part of the Kingdom of Prussia.

In 1975, the old district Steinfurt was merged with the district Tecklenburg, and together with Greven and Saerbeck from the former district Münster the current district was formed.

== Coat of arms ==
The coat of arms combines elements from the coats of arms of the former districts of Steinfurt, Tecklenburg and Münster. The swan in the middle comes from the countship of Steinfurt, the centre of the district. The red bar around the swan symbolizes the clerical state of Münster, which lay around the dukedom of Steinfurt. The red water lily leaves were symbols of the dukes of Tecklenburg.

== Towns and municipalities ==
Clickable map of towns and municipalities in the district

Towns
Municipalities
1. Emsdetten
2. Greven
3. Hörstel
4. Horstmar
5. Ibbenbüren
6. Lengerich
7. Ochtrup
8. Rheine
9. Steinfurt
10. Tecklenburg
1. Altenberge
2. Hopsten
3. Ladbergen
4. Laer
5. Lienen
6. Lotte
7. Metelen
8. Mettingen
9. Neuenkirchen
10. Nordwalde
11. Recke
12. Saerbeck
13. Westerkappeln
14. Wettringen

== Town Twinning ==
Steinfurt is twinned with:

- (United Kingdom) Ealing
