= Barnacken =

Hill in North Rhine-Westphalia, Germany

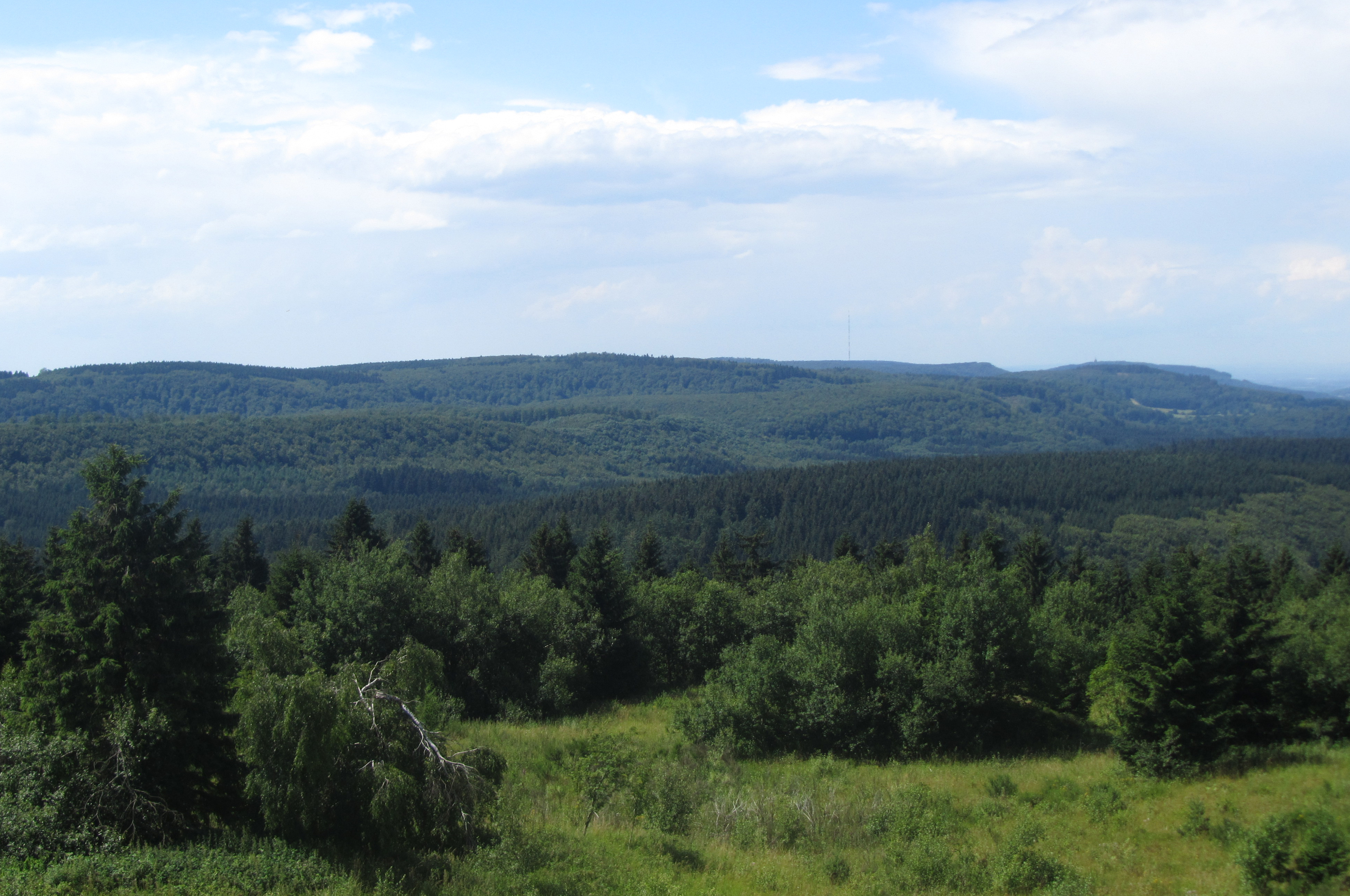
- The Barnacken (centre), highest point in the Teutoburg Forest, seen from the Egge Tower

Highest point
- Elevation: 446.4 m above sea level (NN) (1,463 ft)
- Coordinates: 51°51′22″N 8°54′04″E

Geography
- Location within North Rhine-Westphalia
- Location: Nordrhein-Westfalen, Germany
- Parent range: Teutoburg Forest

At 446.4 m above sea level (NN) the Barnacken is the highest hill in the Teutoburg Forest in the German state of North Rhine-Westphalia.

== Geography ==
The Barnacken is located about 3 km (as the crow flies) southwest of Horn, part of the town of Horn-Bad Meinberg, and northwest of the Silberbach stream, which runs in a valley in a southwest to northeast direction through Veldrom to Leopoldstal, and the transition between the Teutoburg Forest and the Eggegebirge hills.

Its north-northeastern spur is the Kleine Rigi (387.7 m), its eastern subpeak, the Kartoffelberg (ca. 385 m) and its western spur, the Mordkopf (408.6 m); they belong to Horn-Bad Meinberg. Its southern spur is the Padberg (437.5 m) which belongs to Schlangen.

The river Strothe rises on the Barnacken, near the B 1 federal road, and flows in a southwesterly direction alongside the B1 from Horn-Bad Meinberg in the northeast to Schlangen in the southwest and which continues as the Thune before discharging into the river Lippe.

== Weser-Ems watershed ==
The most southeasterly point of the Weser-Ems watershed is located on the Barnacken. All streams that rise in the Teutoburg Forest further to the northwest of this hill and flow westwards discharge, sooner or later, into the river Ems. By contrast, the streams and rivers that flow from here northwards and eastwards join the Weser at some point.

It should also be mentioned here that all streams that rise south of the Barnacken and flow towards the southwest, eventually enter the Lippe, which ultimately flows into the Rhine.

== Points of interest ==
The following points of interest and geographical features may be found in the vicinity of the Barnacken:

- Externsteine
- Fürstenallee
- Gauseköte (pass)
- Hermannsdenkmal
- Lippischer Velmerstot
- Preußischer Velmerstot
- Falkenburg ruins
- Silberbachtal

== See also ==
- List of mountains and hills in North Rhine-Westphalia
