= Thune (Lippe) =

River in Germany

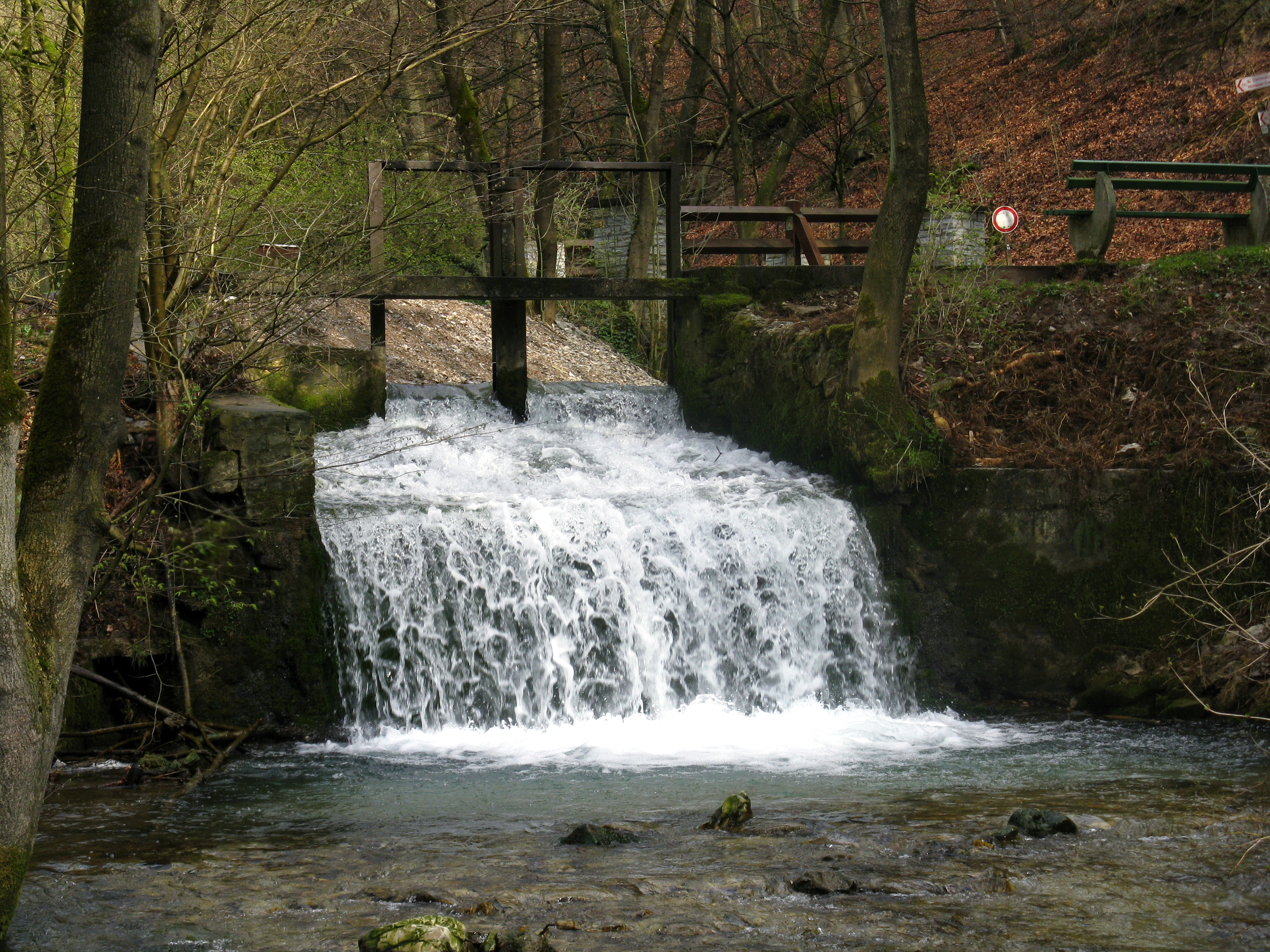

Location
- Country: Germany
- State: North Rhine-Westphalia

Physical characteristics
- Mouth
  - location: Lippe
  - coordinates: 51.761°N 8.683°E
- Length: 22.3 km (13.9 mi)

Basin features
- Progression: Lippe→ Rhine→ North Sea

Thune (in its upper course: Strothe) is a river of North Rhine-Westphalia, Germany. It flows into the Lippe near Paderborn.

== See also ==
- List of rivers of North Rhine-Westphalia
