= Weißer Stein (Eifel) =

Mountain in Belgium

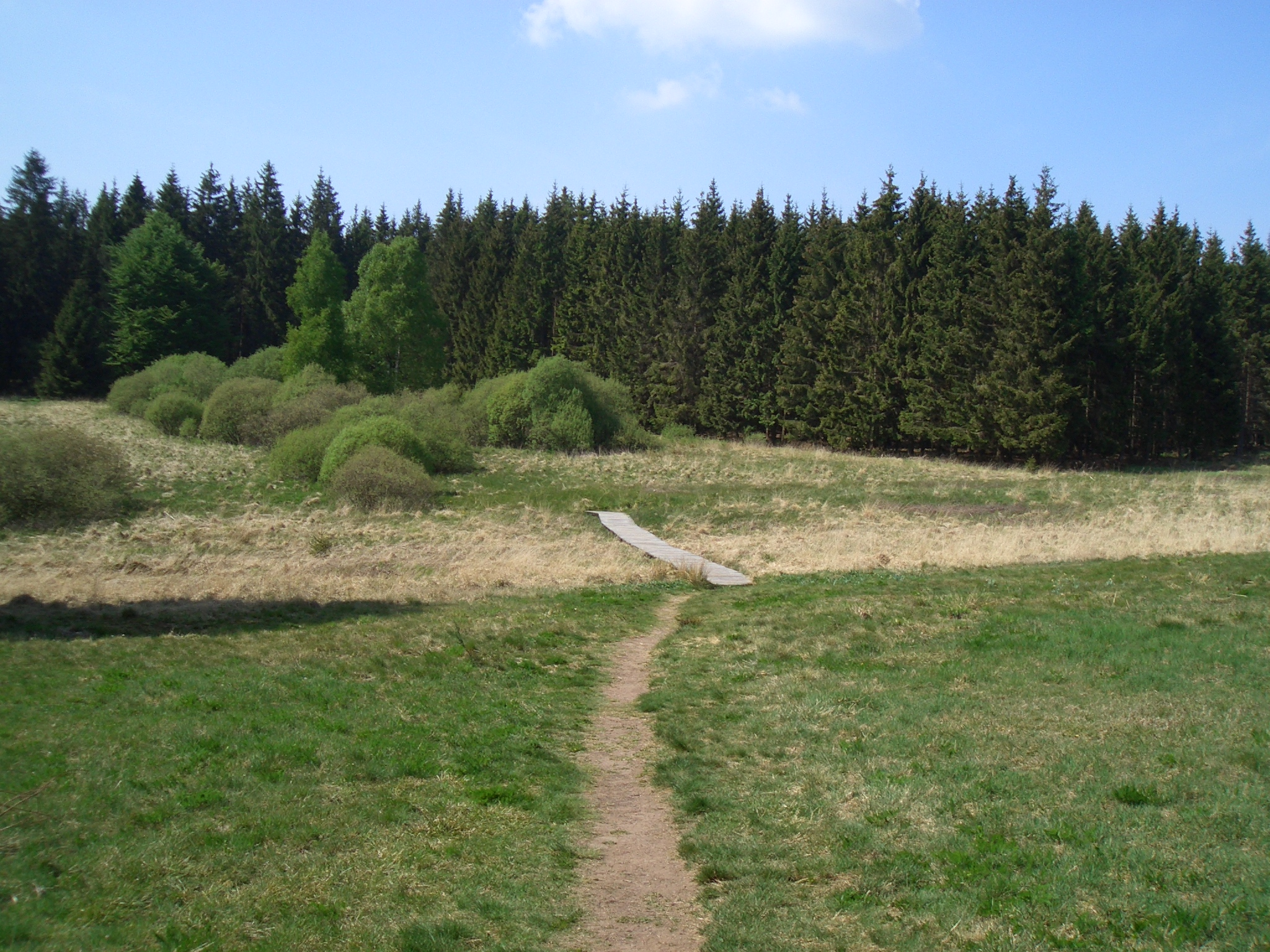
- Boardwalk leading to the Weißer Stein rocks in Belgium

Highest point
- Elevation: 693.3 m (2,275 ft)
- Coordinates: 50°24′30″N 6°22′9″E

Geography
- Location within Belgium
- Location: Büllingen, East Belgium
- Parent range: Eifel

The Weißer Stein (German for White Stone; in English also written as Weisser Stein) is located in the forest of Mürringen, a hamlet of the Büllingen municipality in East Belgium. It is the highest point of this village and the second-highest point of Belgium. It also lies on the border with the German state of North Rhine-Westphalia.

German measurements (until 1920 the area belonged to Germany) indicated an altitude of 689 m (NN, German standard) at the nearby located measuring point, and a small higher area surrounded by the 690-meter altitude line. In 2007 the University of Liège executed measurements and found a height of 692 m (TAW, Belgian standard). The altitude meter of Google Earth caused some doubt about Signal de Botrange (694 m TAW) as Belgium's highest point because its vertical reference EGM96 deviates a couple of meters from the German Normalnull and the Belgian TAW, thereby suggesting an altitude of 701 m for the Weißer Stein. An accurate control by the Belgian National Geographic Institute in 2010 showed the Weißer Stein to be at maximum 693.3 m TAW (=691 m NN), with which it differs by less than 1 m from Signal de Botrange.
