= Brodtberg =

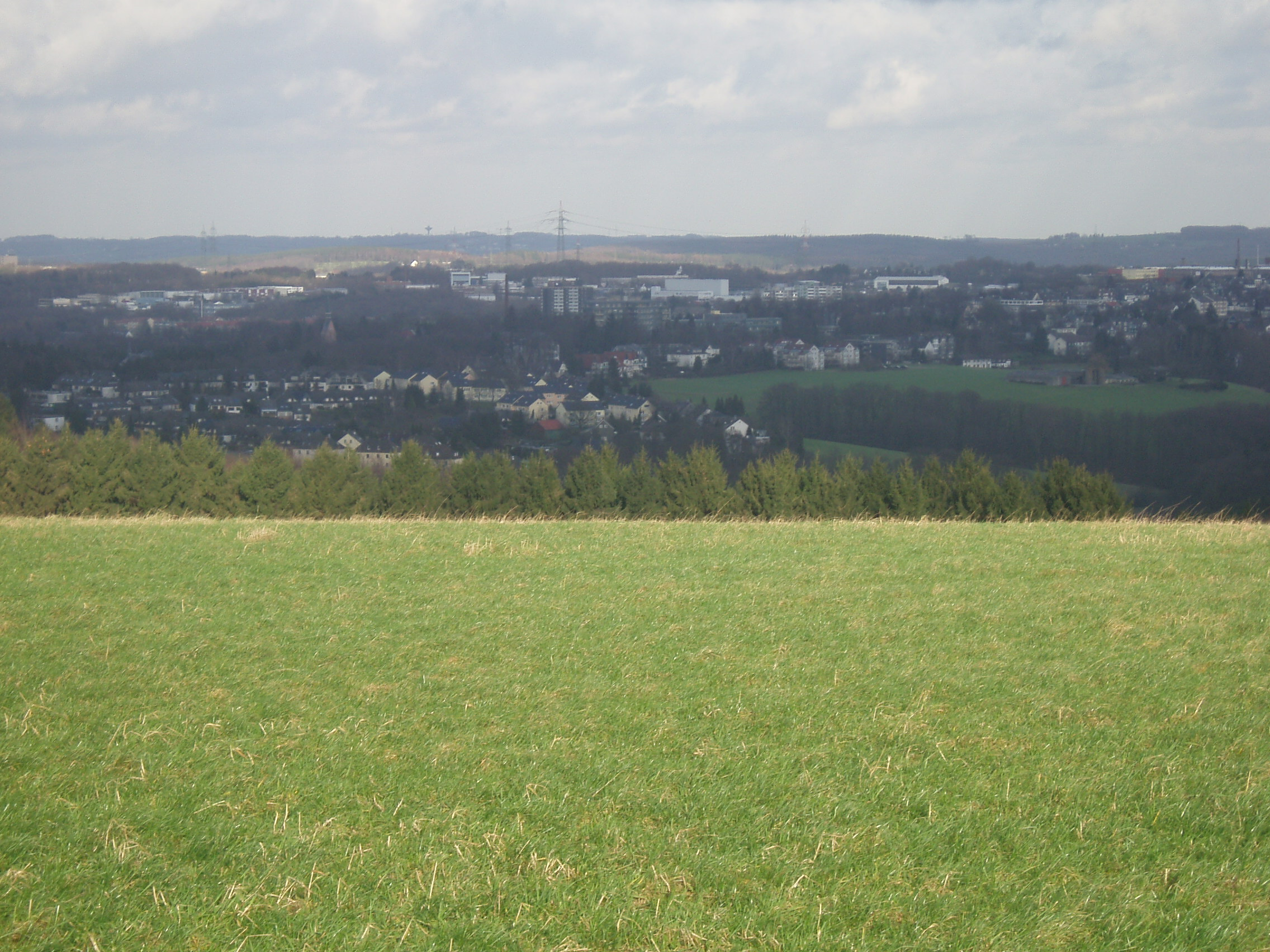
- View from Brodtberg

Highest point
- Elevation: 378.86 m above sea level (NN) (1,243.0 ft)
- Listing: Highest point in the borough of Remscheid; Highest hill in the region of Düsseldorf
- Coordinates: 51°11′08″N 7°13′16″E

Geography
- Location within North Rhine-Westphalia
- Location: Remscheid, North Rhine-Westphalia, Germany
- Parent range: Bergisches Land

The Brodtberg, at 378.86 m above sea level (NN), is the highest hill in Remscheid and the region of Düsseldorf in Germany. Despite that, it is not particularly prominent; for example the nearby quarter of Lennep lies at elevations of up to 370 metres.

== Geography ==
The hill is located in the quarter of Hohenhagen and belongs to the borough of Remscheid-Süd. The Brodtberg lies west of the hill of Westerholt, the second highest point in Remscheid.
