= Desenberg =

Hill in North Rhine-Westphalia, Germany

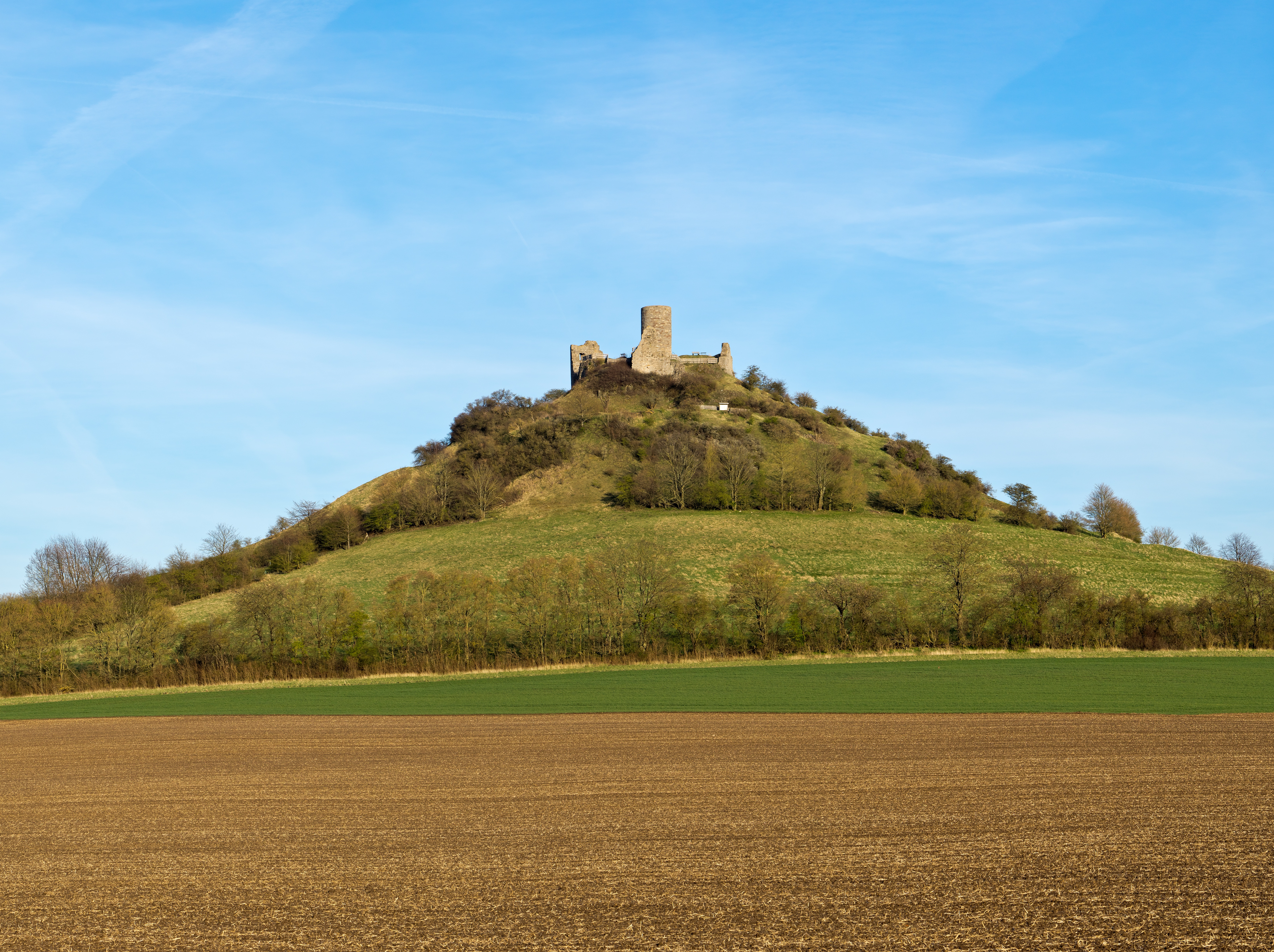
- Desenberg and Desenberg Castle, western aspect

Highest point
- Elevation: 343.6 m above sea level (NHN) (1,127 ft)
- Listing: Ruins of Desenberg Castle with its bergfried (observation tower)
- Coordinates: 51°30′1.6″N 9°11′54″E

Geography
- Location within North Rhine-Westphalia
- Location: near Daseburg; Höxter, North Rhine-Westphalia (Germany)

Geology
- Mountain type: free standing extinct volcano
- Rock type: Basalt

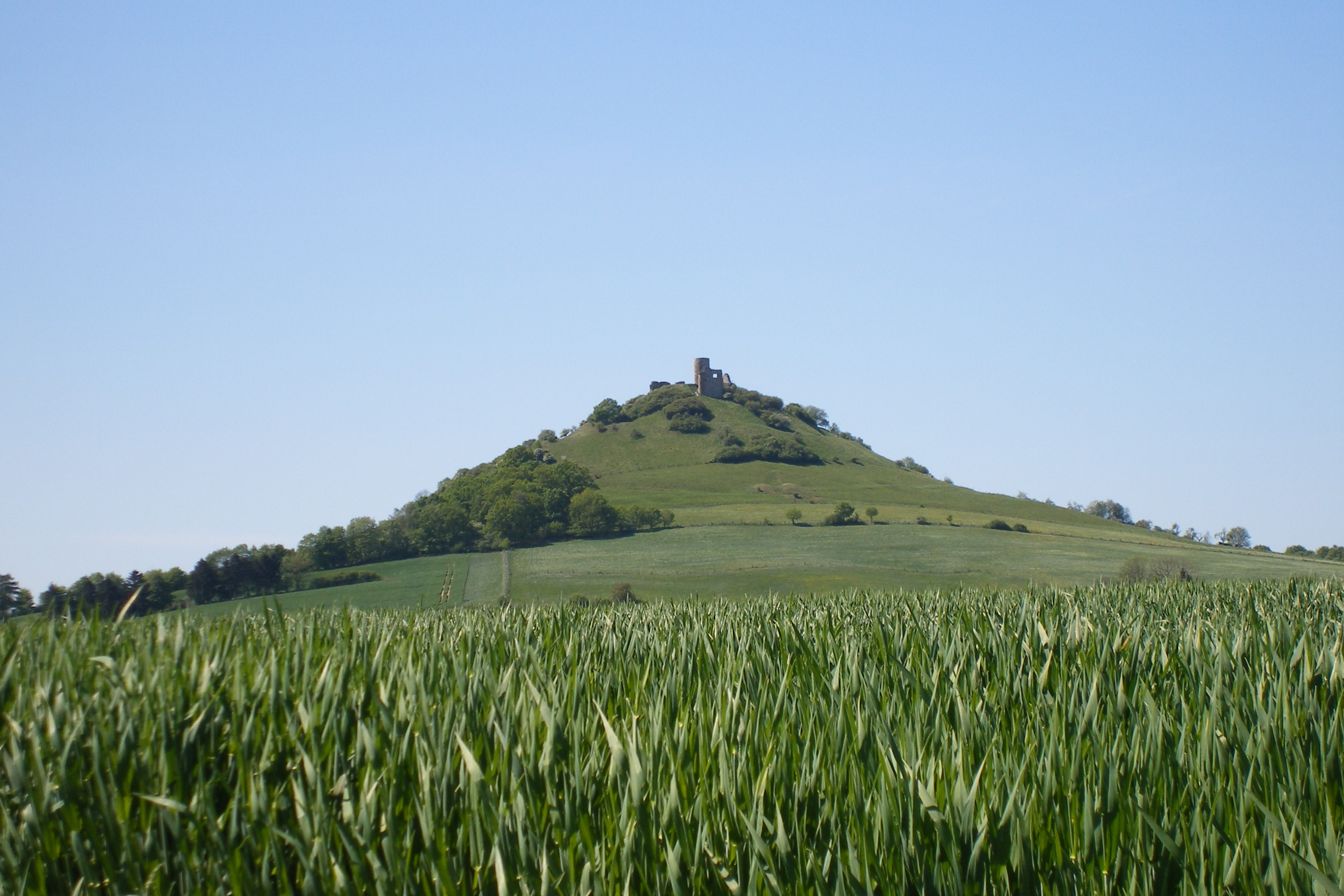
View of the Desenberg from the east-northeast

The Desenberg near Daseburg in the North Rhine-Westphalian county of Höxter is 343.6 m above sea level (NHN) and the most prominent hill in the Warburg Börde, a relatively level, fertile Börde region. The hill is a basalt knoll crowned by the ruins of Desenberg Castle and a relict of recent geological history and volcanism, as well as medieval feudalism and warfare. The present shape of the Desenberg has arisen through weathering.

== Geography ==
=== Location ===
The Desenberg rises in Ostwestfalen around 3.5 km east-northeast of the centre of Warburg, 8 km south-southwest of the town of Borgentreich, 12 km west of the town of Hofgeismar and 2 km southwest of the village of Daseburg. About 1.7 km to the south, the River Diemel runs from west to east past the hill, and 2.3 km to the east its tributary, the Eggel, runs from north to south.

=== Topography ===
The Desenberg is a cone-shaped inselberg that can be seen from afar, the summit of which rises around 190 m above the Diemel and about 100 to 150 m above its surroundings. It is evidence of East Westphalian Tertiary basalt volcanism, a vein of basalt that protected the rocks in its immediate vicinity from erosion.

=== Natural regions ===
The Desenberg is a singularity (360.00) in the Große Börde (360.0) subunit of the Warburger Börde (360) major unit within the major unit group of the Upper Weser Uplands (No. 36).

== History and legend ==
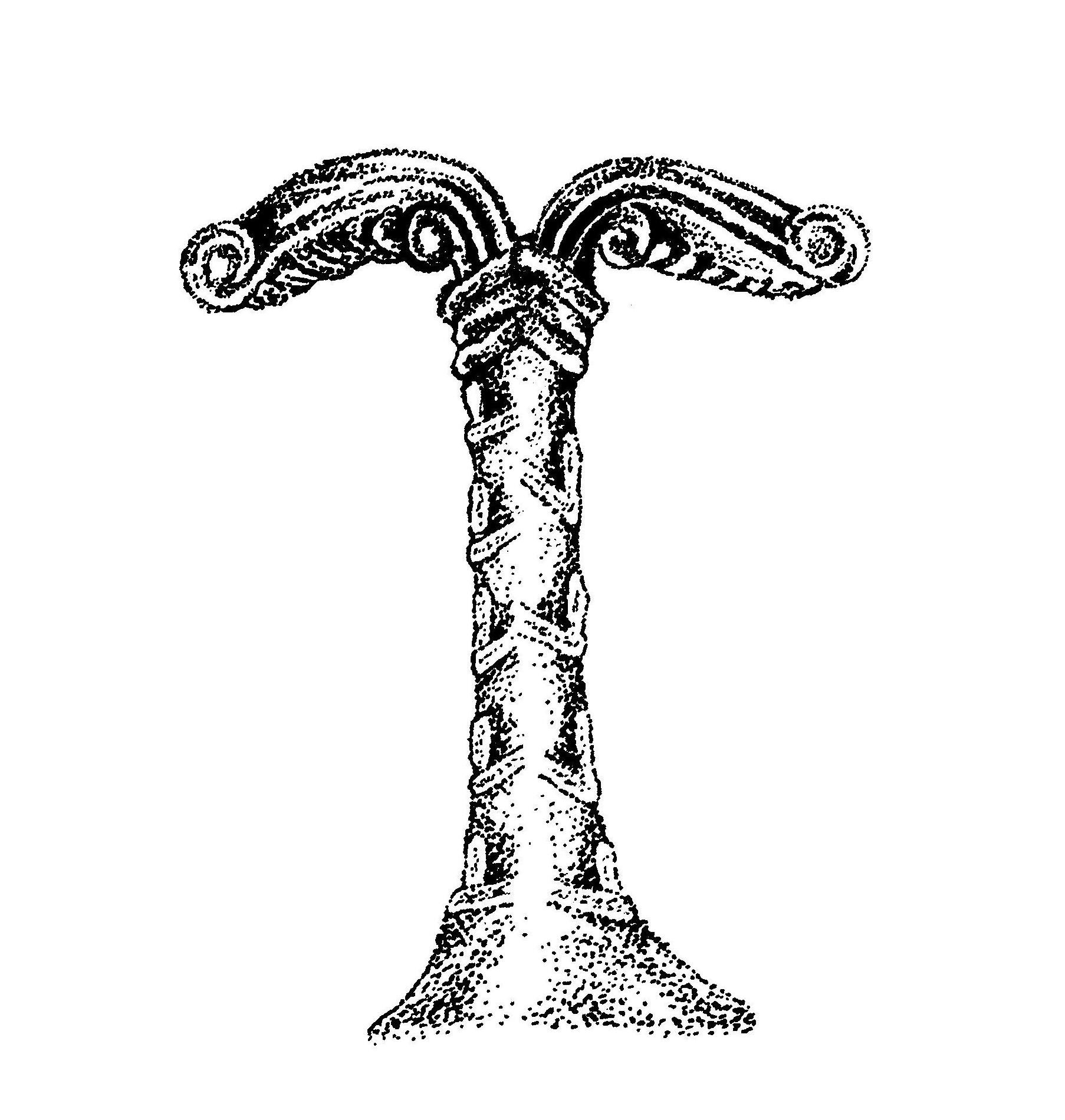
The Desenberg is considered a possible location for the Irminsul (here as an illustration from the Externsteine relief).

Surface finds show that people lived in the area surrounding the Desenberg from an early age. In 1995, the Daseburger Kreisgraben (Daseburg Circular Ditch) was discovered while working on a gas pipeline. The facility is oriented towards the Desenberg, which, viewed from the middle of the ditch, shows the setting position of the sun at the summer solstice in the fifth millennium BC. The mountain was probably later a Germanic place of worship. The Desenberg is discussed as a possible location for the Irminsul, an early medieval Saxon-Germanic sanctuary. Another possible location, the Eresburg near Marsberg, is only 30 kilometres away. The legend of the mirror knight is often mentioned In connection with the Desenberg. In the legend, a brave Saxon frightens and slays a dragon living on the hill using the reflection off his shield. This may be the origin of the name of the House of Spiegel (zum Desenberg) (e.g. Witukind of Spiegel zum Desenberg or Henry of Spiegel zum Desenberg), whose coat of arms shows three mirrors as an indication of this deed of heroism.

But according to legend, Charlemagne lies sleeping at the Desenberg. Throughout the Middle Ages, enchanted Messiah emperors such as Emperor Frederick Barbarossa, his grandson Frederick II, Charlemagne, Frederick the "Freidige", as well as others of this name "Frederick = Prince of Peace", including the Prince of Light Sigfrid and Widukind (Wittekind), played a role, according to the legend. And so in this sense also Charlemagne, who sleeps enchanted in the Desenberg, should become the expected emperor again. As regards the myth about Emperor Charlemagne, the following legend is told:

The emperor sits deep in the Desenberg with his knights and rests from his victories. His long beard grows through the table. He often asks the dwarfs who are gathered around him for the year. When the time comes, he will go out of the mountain with his generals to restore the great empire and to usher in a golden age of peace and happiness. Shepherds who tended their cattle on the Desenberg often went to see the emperor. They surrounded the mountain with caper spurge. Sometimes they played their most beautiful songs to him and received many gifts. A baker from Warburg once brought the emperor a basket full of white bread and received rich wages for it. (see also: King asleep in mountain)

The Desenberg and Desenberg Castle came into the possession of the von Spiegels around 1250. In the 14th century the family split into the lines of Spiegel zum Desenberg and Spiegel zu Peckelsheim. In the middle of the 16th century the Spiegels left Desenberg and took up knightly seats nearby, in Bühne, Rothenburg, Klingenburg, Wickelgönne and Dalheim. The mountain and the castle ruins are still owned by the Counts of Spiegel zum Desenberg.

The castle on the Desenberg had a strategically advantageous location, as the paths around the castle were visible from there.

== Views ==
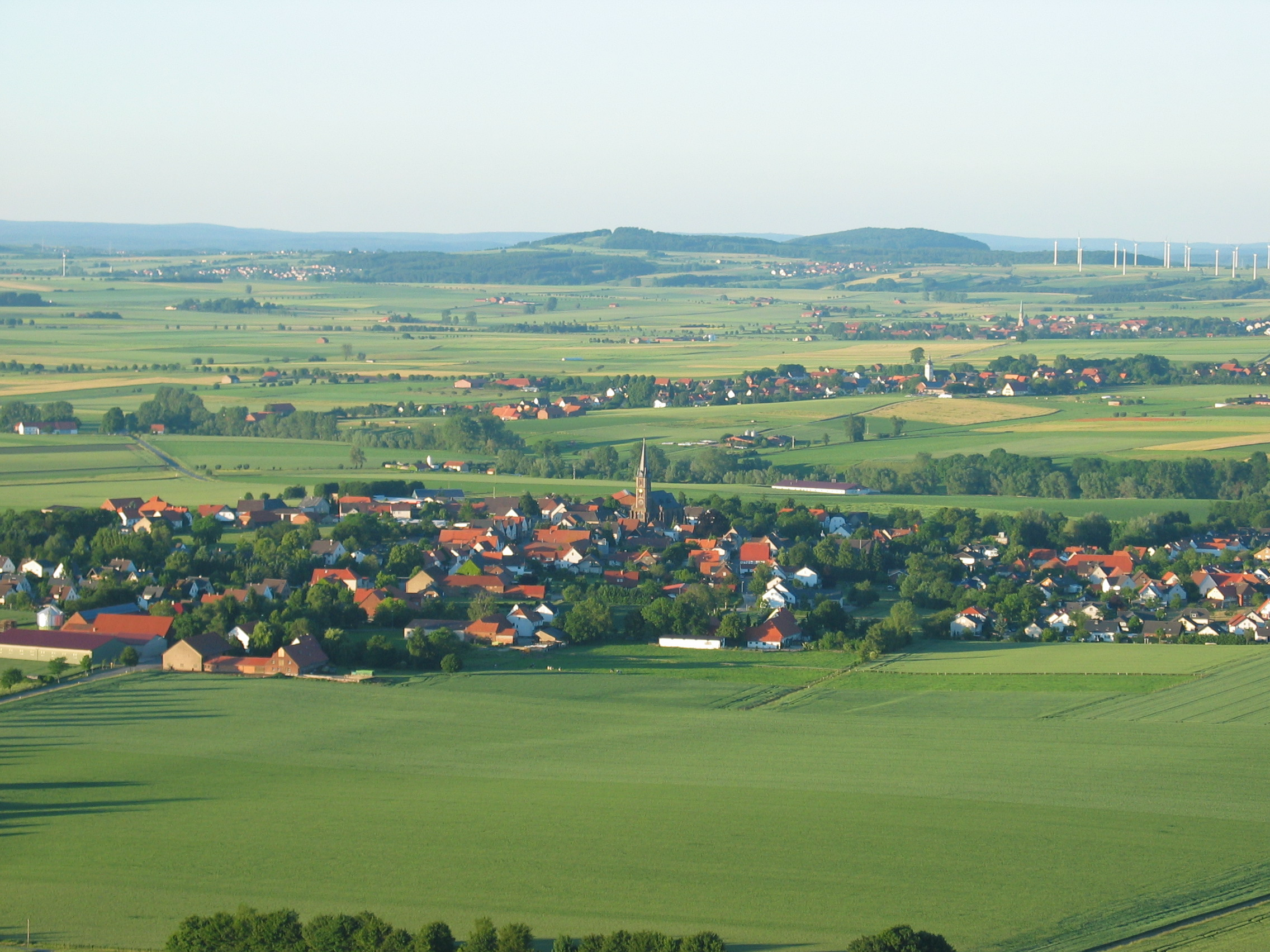
View from the Desenberg looking north-east over the Warburger Börde and village of Daseburg, to the Deiselberg (left of the wind farm ) and Weser Uplands (on the horizon)

From the Desenberg and especially from the tower of the freely accessible Desenberg castle ruins, the view extends over the Warburg Börde and in the distance to the Weser Uplands, including the Reinhardswald, the Habichtswald hills at Kassel, Rothaar Mountains and Egge.

== See also ==
- List of volcanoes in Germany

== Literature ==
- Peter Aufgebauer: Desenberg und Plesse. In: Plesse-Archiv 27 (1991), pp. 208–217.
- Ignaz Theodor Liborius Meyer: Der Desenberg bei Warburg. In: Wigand’s Archiv für Geschichte und Alterthumskunde Westfalen, 1. Bd. (1825), 2. Heft, S. 25–48 (Digitalisat) und S. 110–112 (digitalised)
- Hans-Werner Peine und Cornelia Kneppe: Der Desenberg bei Warburg-Daseburg, Kreis Höxter. In: Frühe Burgen in Westfalen, Heft 16 (2014). digitalised
