= Lienen =

- Town
- Coat of arms

- Location of Lienen within Steinfurt district
- Interactive map of Lienen
- Location within Germany Location within North Rhine-Westphalia
- Coordinates: 52°08′46″N 7°58′26″E
- Country: Germany
- State: North Rhine-Westphalia
- Admin. region: Münster
- District: Steinfurt

Government
  - Mayor (2020–25): Arne Strietelmeier

Area
  - Total: 73.44 km^{2} (28.36 sq mi)
- Elevation: 82 m (269 ft)

Population (2025-12-31)
  - Total: 8,469
  - Density: 115.3/km^{2} (298.7/sq mi)
- Time zone: UTC+01:00 (CET)
  - Summer (DST): UTC+02:00 (CEST)
- Postal codes: 49536
- Dialling codes: 05483; 05484 (Kattenvenne)
- Vehicle registration: ST (until 1975: TE)
- Website: www.lienen.de

Lienen (German pronunciation: [ˈliːnən]; Westphalian: Linen) is a municipality in the district of Steinfurt, in North Rhine-Westphalia, Germany. It is situated approximately 15 km south-east of Osnabrück and 30 km north-east of Münster.

Lienen is a sister city with Saint Marys, Ohio in the United States. Lienen's neighboring municipalities, Ladbergen and Lengerich, are sister cities with Saint Marys' neighbors New Knoxville and Wapakoneta, respectively.

== Population ==
Historical population

Year	Pop.	±% p.a.
1965	7,028	—
1970	7,185	+0.44%
1975	7,560	+1.02%
1980	7,707	+0.39%
1985	7,736	+0.08%
1990	8,194	+1.16%
1995	8,575	+0.91%

Year	Pop.	±% p.a.
2000	9,045	+1.07%
2005	8,822	−0.50%
2010	8,578	−0.56%
2015	8,559	−0.04%
2020	8,622	+0.15%
2025	8,469	−0.36%

Source: Landesdatabank Nordrhein-Westfalen
