= Monte Troodelöh =

Coordinates: 50°56′19″N 7°08′31″E

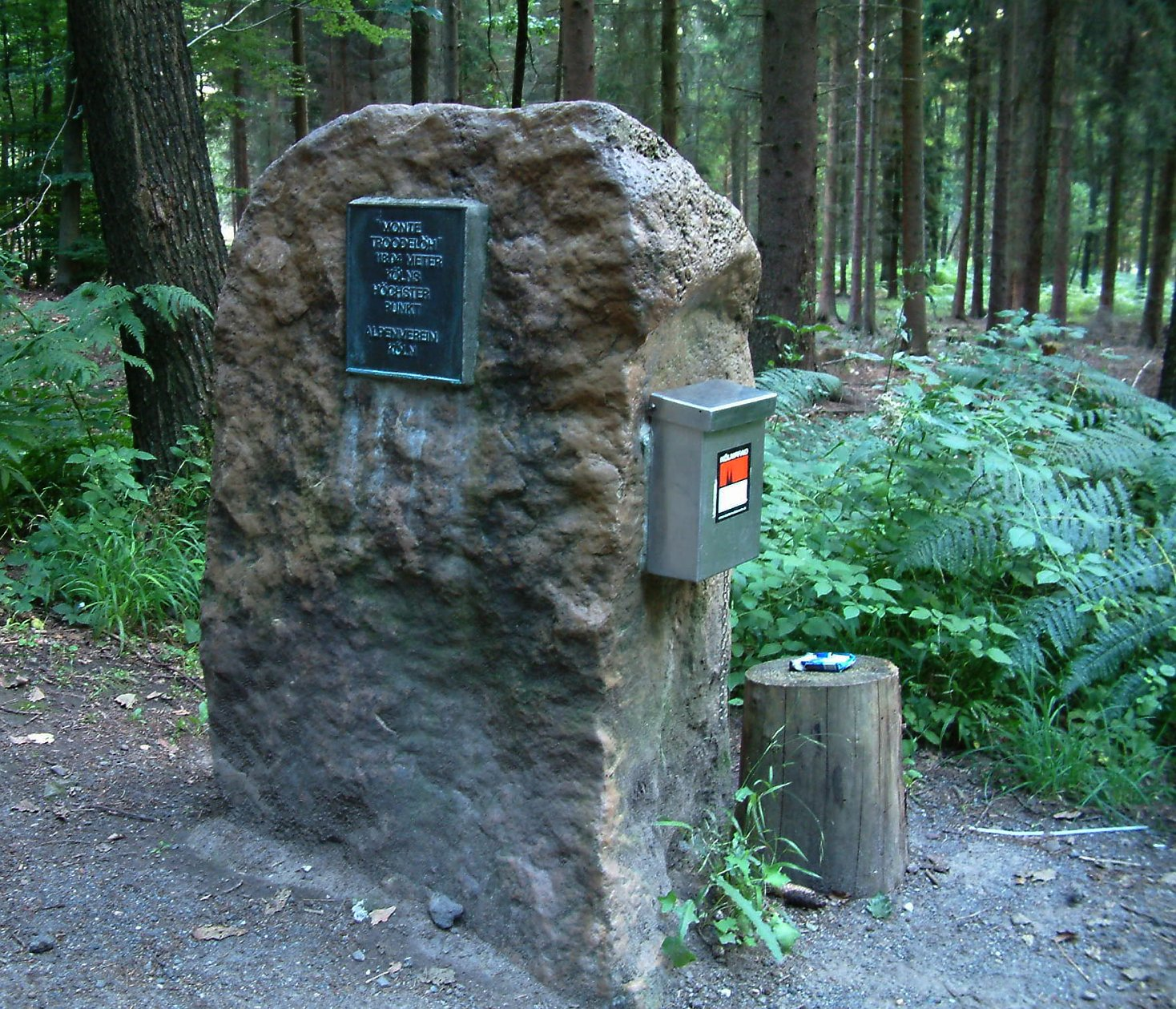
Monte Troodelöh, the highest point within the municipal area of the city of Cologne

Monte Troodelöh is the highest point in the municipal area of the city of Cologne. It lies in the Rath/Heumar district, approximately 1,250 metres south of the A4 at Wolfsweg between the intersection of Pionier-Hütten-Weg and the Brück-Forsbacher Weg.

== Overview ==
It lies on rising ground in the middle of Königsforst at a height of 118 meters above sea level. Above the Wolfsweg there is a prominence that is 130 metres higher, but it lies outside of the boundaries of Cologne and is officially a part of Bergisch Gladbach.

As recently as 1999, Monte Troodelöh was largely unknown. Today it is a destination on many suggested hiking routes and is considered a tourist attraction, in spite of the fact that the spot offers neither an attractive view nor any rest stops or amenities.
