= Teutoburg Forest / Egge Hills Nature Park =

Nature park in North Rhine-Westphalia, Germany

Coordinates: 51°48′44″N 8°52′01″E

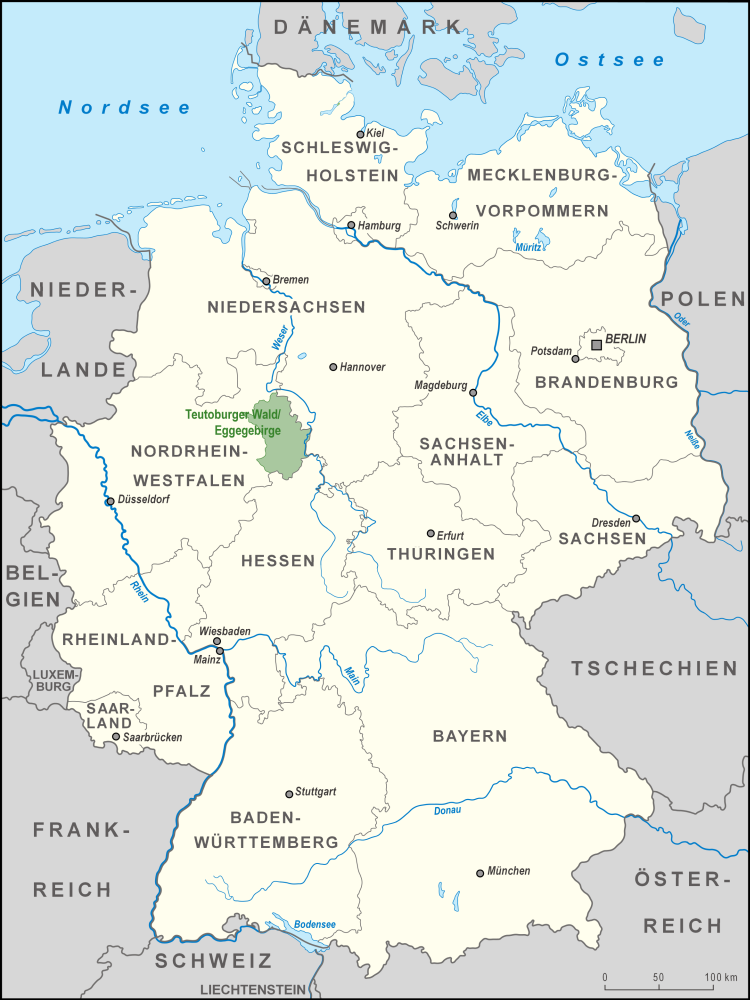
Location of the Teutoburg Forest / Egge Hills Nature Park

The Teutoburg Forest / Egge Hills Nature Park (German: Naturpark Teutoburger Wald / Eggegebirge) is a nature park founded in 1965 in the northeast of the German state of North Rhine-Westphalia. After being expanded in 2008, the nature park is now the largest in Germany, covering an area of 2,700 square kilometres (1,000 sq mi). The park comprise the southern Teutoburg Forest and Egge Hills.

The Teutoburg Forest / Egge Hills Nature Park won the state competition for nature parks, "Naturpark.2009.NRW", with its concept "Natural Health" (Natürlich Gesund).

== Geography ==
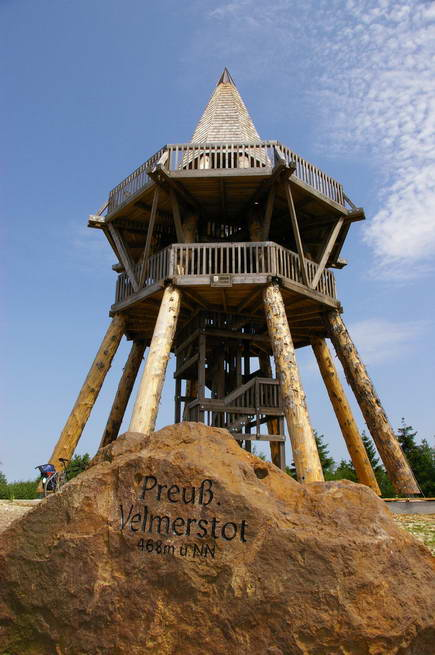
Preußischer Velmerstot, the highest point in the nature park

The northern part of the nature park begins immediately southeast of Bielefeld and then runs over the southern Teutoburg Forest in a southeasterly direction via Oerlinghausen and Detmold to Horn-Bad Meinberg. The southern part of the area is contiguous to it and runs along the Egge Hills southwards via Bad Driburg and Willebadessen almost as far as Marsberg. In the east, the nature park reaches as far as the River Weser near Höxter; to the east it extends up to the city boundary of Paderborn. It is adjoined by the Northern Teutoburg Forest-Wiehen Hills Nature Park northwest of Bielefeld.

In addition to the two Central Upland ranges that give the park its name, there are elements of the Weser Uplands, the Oberwälder Land and the Lippe Uplands in the park as well as parts of the karst landscape of the Paderborn Plateau and the Senne. The highest point of the park, at 495.8 m above sea level (NN), is the Köterberg near Höxter. The second highest elevation is the Preußische Velmerstot at 468 m above sea level (NN). The volcano of Sandebeck in Steinheim-Sandebeck is the northernmost volcano in Germany.

The regional climate has average annual temperatures of 7 to 8 °C (45 to 46 °F) and average annual precipitation between 625 millimetres (24.6 in) (Warburg) and 1,132 millimetres (44.6 in) (Feldrom).

The region of the nature park is also called the Health Garden of Germany (Heilgarten Deutschland). The reason for this sobriquet is its unique plethora of natural spa resources, such as brine, bogs, cold and hot springs. There are spas like Bad Salzuflen, Bad Lippspringe, Bad Meinberg and Bad Driburg, as well as numerous climatic and Kneipp spas, on the edge of the Teutoburg Forest.

== Name ==
The name of the nature park is written – contrary to typographical conventions – with spaces either side of the forward slash. This was agreed by the park authority on 6 December 2007. The German language authority, Duden, gives freedom to firms and associations to do this. Strictly, the typographically or orthographically correct way of writing the name would be "Teutoburg Forest/Egge Hills Nature Park" ("Naturpark Teutoburger Wald/Eggegebirge").

== Conservation ==
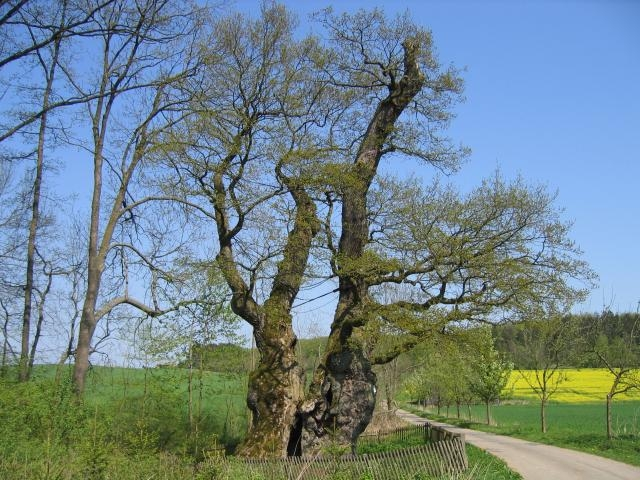
The natural monument of Rieseneiche near Borlinghausen

Some 60% of the area of the nature park is forested. As a large, contiguous forest, the landscape unit fulfils an ecological balancing function. The Egge Hills and the Teutoburg Forest are thus important components of the state-wide wildlife corridor. A good 85% of the area is protected landscape, some 10% is nature reserve and around 14% is Special Areas of Conservation. In addition, there are about 1,000 designated natural monuments (e. g. trees, rock formations, biotopes).

The mascot of the nature park is the wildcat, whose presence in the region is one of the oldest to have survived to the present day in the state of North Rhine-Westphalia.

=== Sights ===
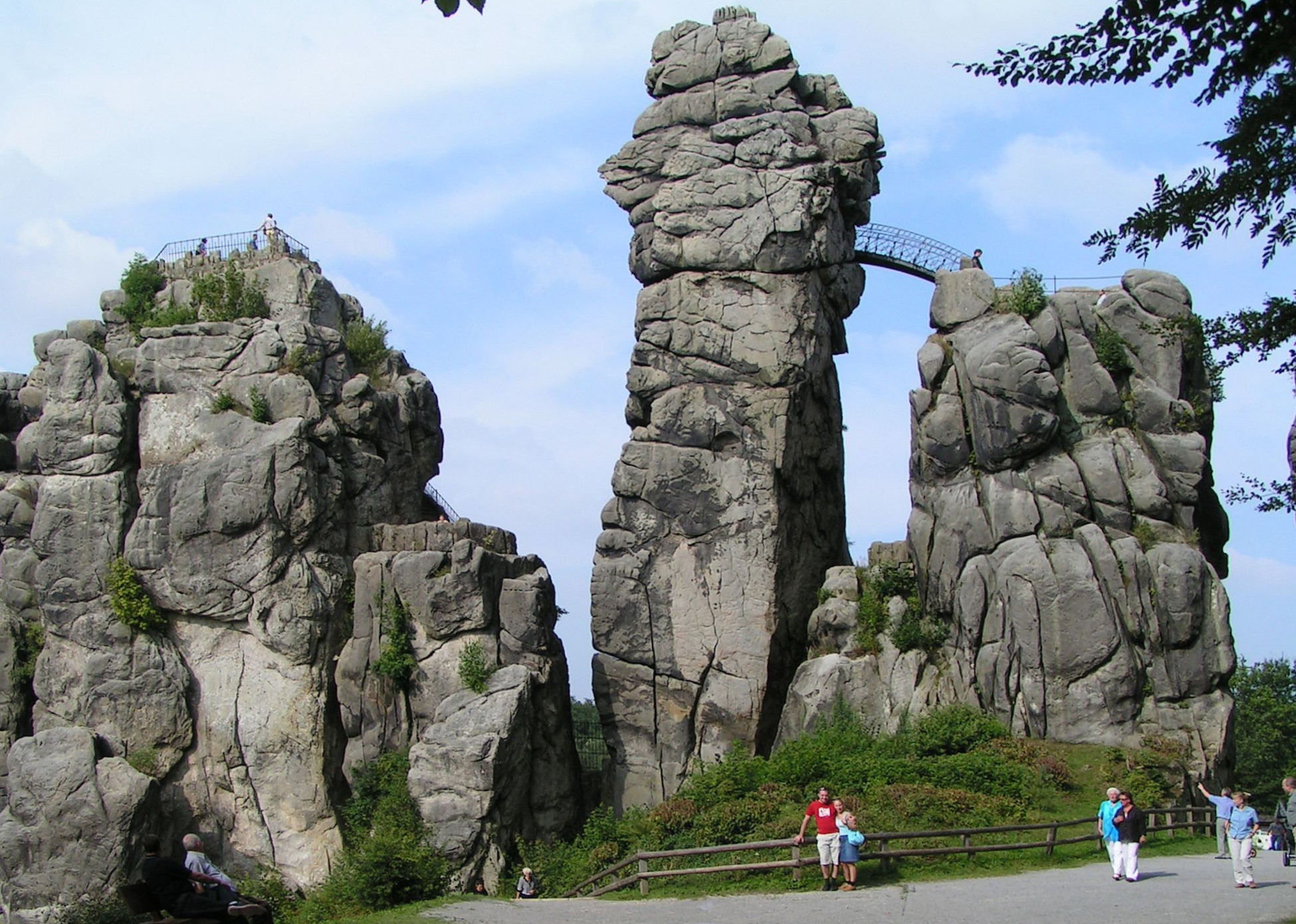
Externsteine

- Externsteine
- Hermannsdenkmal
- Blue zinc violets in the Bleikuhlen at Blankenrode
- Eggeweg and Hermannsweg
- Preußischer and Lippischer Velmerstot
- Köterberg
- Desenberg
- Altenbeken Viaduct
- Fürstenallee
- Rheder Castle near Brakel
- Berlebeck Eagle Observatory
- Iburg near Bad Driburg
- Sparrenberg Castle in Bielefeld
- Dalheim Abbey
- Hardehausen Abbey
- Corvey Abbey
- Detmold Open-air Museum

== Literature ==
- Naturschutzzentrum Senne (pub.): Senne und Teutoburger Wald. tpk-Regionalverlag Bielefeld, 2008, ISBN 978-3-936359-32-9.
- Willy Lippert: Das Eggegebirge und sein Vorland. (Lippert Wanderführer) Eggegebirgsverein. Bad Driburg. 1996. 5th ed.
- Sabine Schierholz: Reiseführer Naturpark Teutoburger Wald / Eggegebirge. tpk-Regionalverlag, 2009, ISBN 978-3-936359-34-3.
- World Habitat Society (pub.): Freizeitkarte Naturpark Teutoburger Wald / Eggegebirge 1:100.000 (published for the Teutoburg Forest / Egge Hills Nature Park), 2009, ISBN 978-3-9811646-1-9.

== See also ==
- List of nature parks in Germany
