= Silberbach (Heubach) =

River in Germany

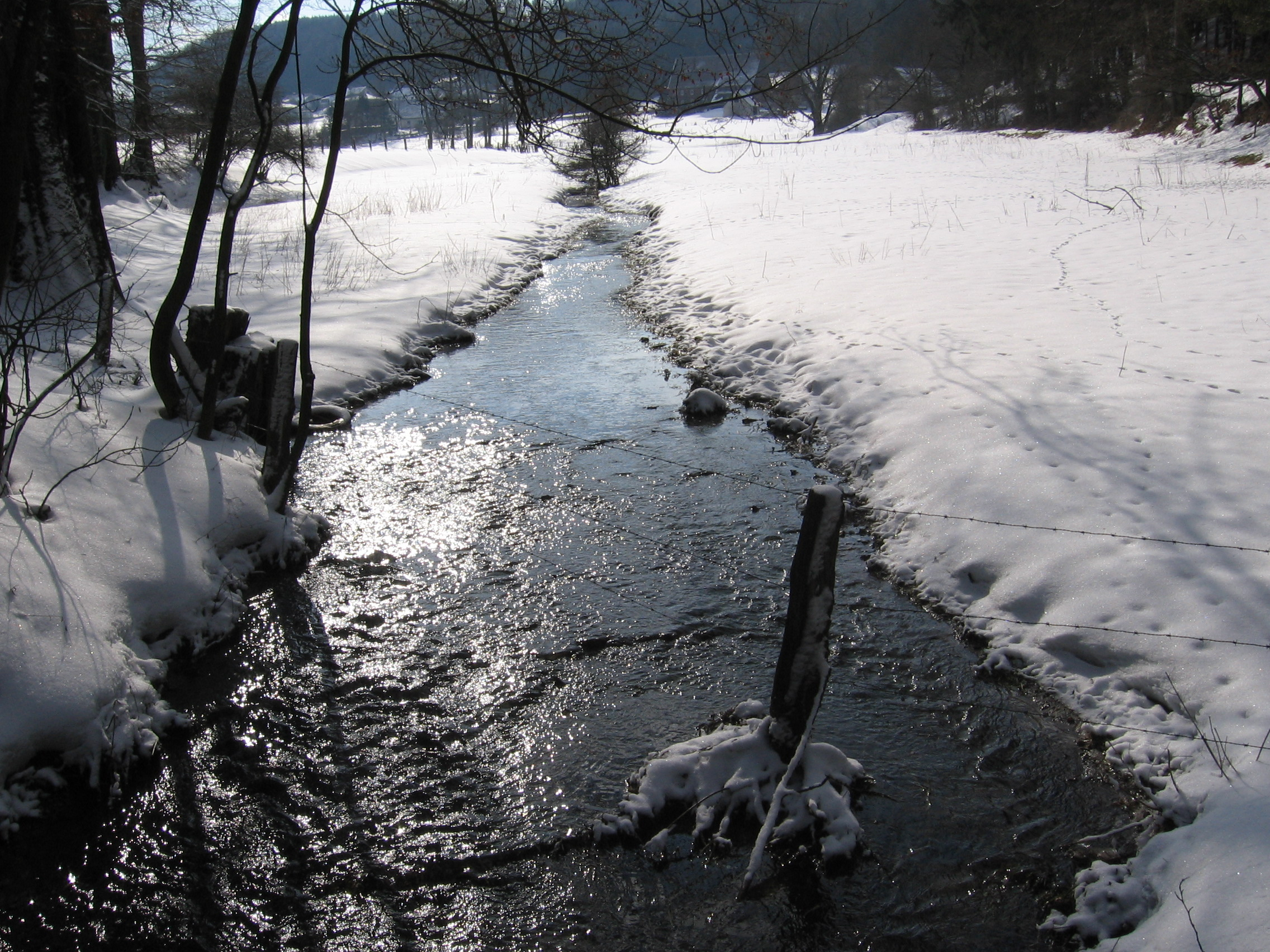
- Silberbach near Feldrom

Location
- Country: Germany
- State: North Rhine-Westphalia

Physical characteristics
- Mouth
  - location: Heubach
  - coordinates: 51°51′21″N 9°00′24″E
- Length: 11.4 km (7.1 mi)

Basin features
- Progression: Heubach→ Emmer→ Weser→ North Sea

Silberbach is a river of North Rhine-Westphalia, Germany. It is a left tributary of the Heubach near Horn-Bad Meinberg.

== See also ==
- List of rivers of North Rhine-Westphalia
