= Hermannsweg =

Hiking trail in Germany

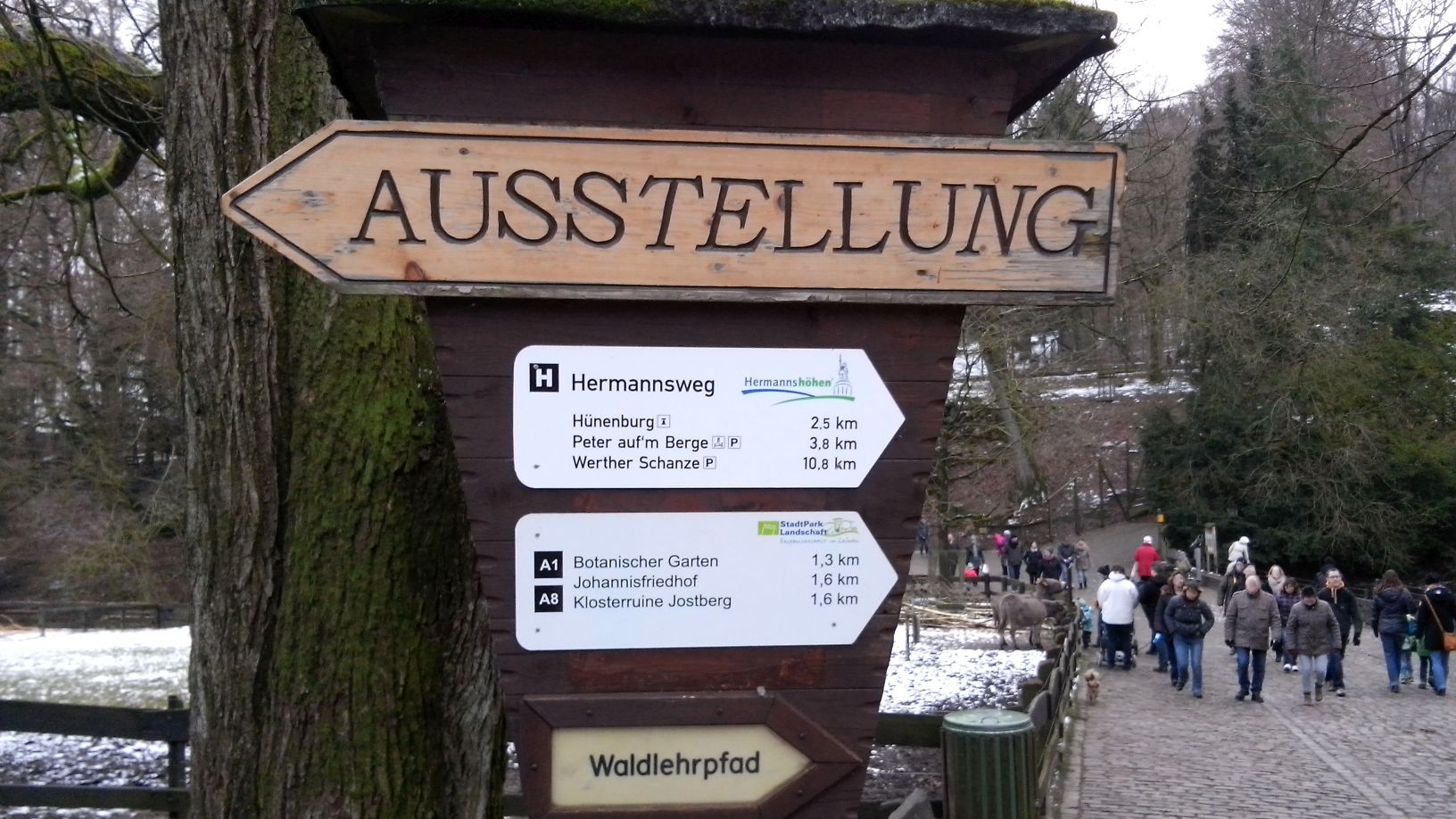
- Hermannsweg signage in Heimat-Tierpark Olderdissen, Bielefeld
- Length: 156 km (97 mi)
- Location: Teutoburg Forest, Germany
- Use: hiking
- Highest point: 441 m (1,447 ft)
- Lowest point: 100 m (330 ft)
- Waymark: white "H" on black square

The Hermannsweg is a 156 kilometres (97 mi) long hiking trail which follows the ridge of the Teutoburg Forest, running from Rheine to Velmerstot in Germany. It is marked by signposts showing a white H on a black background. The Hermannsweg is named for Arminius (German name: Hermann), a Cherusci chief who defeated the Romans in the Battle of the Teutoburg Forest in 9 AD. Together with the 70 kilometres (43 mi) long Eggeweg, this long-distance hiking trail forms the Hermannshöhen. It is maintained by the Teutoburger-Wald-Verein e.V., located in Bielefeld.

== History ==
Parts of the way along the ridge of the Teutoburg Forest were already used by hunter-gatherers and traders in the Mesolithic period, as evidenced by findings of flint tools. In the Middle Ages, the Hermannsweg connected surrounding areas to travelling and trading routes of interregional importance such as the Westphalian Hellweg and the Frankfurter Weg. The hiking trail was officially established in 1902, 25 years after the construction of the Hermannsdenkmal near Detmold, which commemorates the Cheruscan victory over the Romans in 9 AD.

== The Route ==
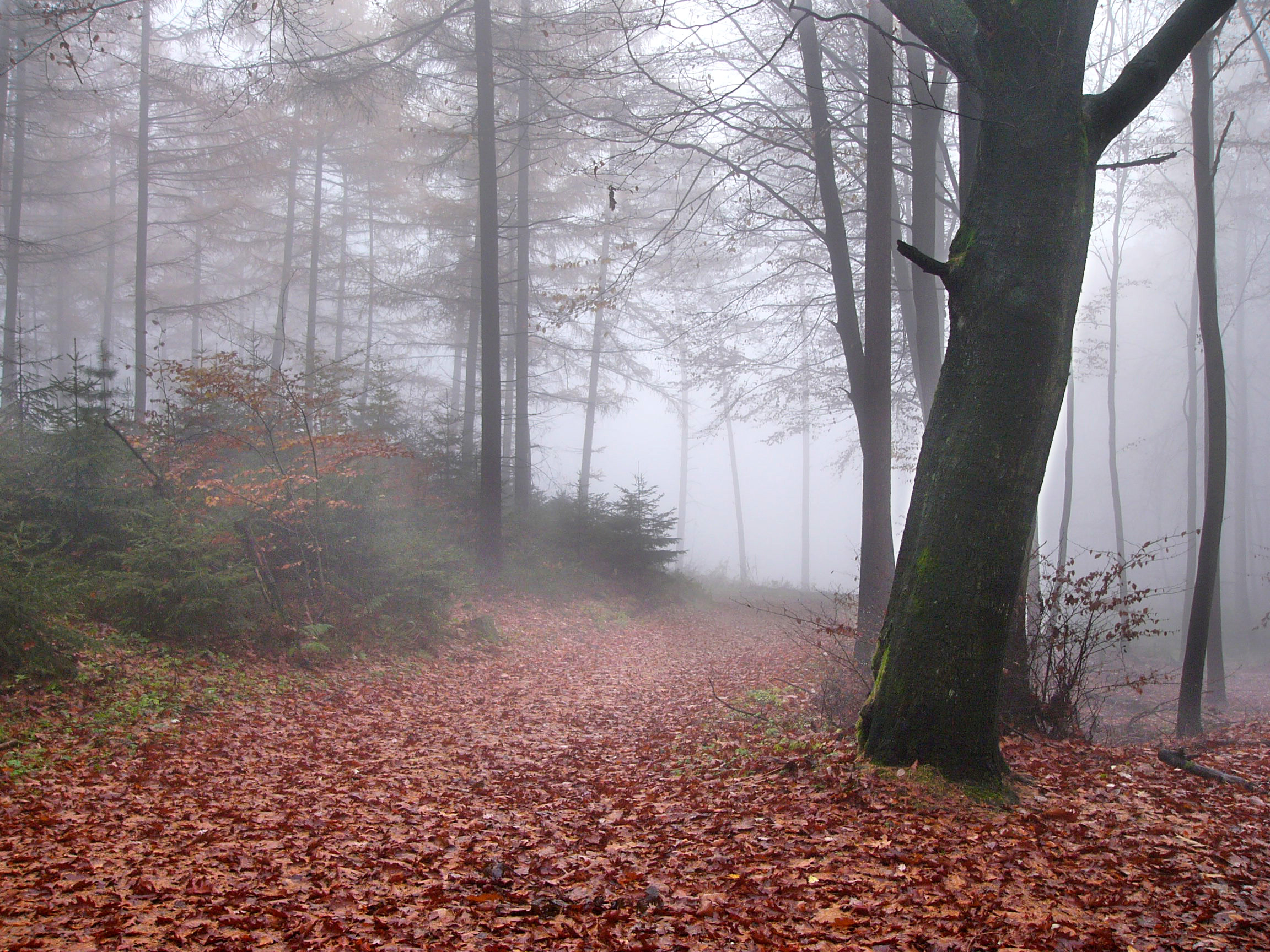
Hermannsweg in Teutoburg Forest near Oerlinghausen

The Hermannsweg starts and ends in the state of North Rhine-Westphalia, but also crosses part of Lower Saxony. The trail starts at a low altitude of less than 100 metres (330 ft) in Rheine, in the North-West of North Rhine-Westphalia, and runs to the South-East through Bervergern, Ibbenbüren, Tecklenburg, Bad Iburg, Hilter, Borgholzhausen, Werther, Bielefeld and Oerlinghausen before ending at an altitude of 441 metres (1,447 ft) on the mountain Velmerstot near Horn-Bad Meinberg. The trail leads mostly through forest, but along the way there are also many sights and landmarks of cultural, historical or geological importance. These include: the Naturzoo Rheine, the Water Castle Surenburg, the 20 metres (66 ft) high sandstone formations Dörenther Klippen, the former limestone quarry Lengericher Canyon, the largely intact mediaeval town Tecklenburg, the Baumwipfelpad Bad Iburg, the castle Schloss Iburg, the Lookout Luisenturm in Borgholzhausen, the Castle Ravensberg, the Olderdissen Heimat-Zoo in Bielefeld, the Sparrenberg Castle in Bielefeld, the Hermannsdenkmal, Adlerwarte Berlebeck, the bird-park Heiligenkirchen, the Externsteine and a variety of museums.
