= Teutoburgerwald =

Teutoburgerwald may refer to

- Teutoburg Forest, a mountain range in Germany
  - Battle of the Teutoburg Forest, 9 AD, between Germanic tribes and Roman legions
- 10661 Teutoburgerwald, an asteroid named after the mountains
