= Teutoburg =

Teutoburg may refer to:

- Teutoburg Forest, formerly Osning, in the German states of Lower Saxony and North Rhine-Westphalia
- Battle of the Teutoburg Forest, in 9 AD
