= Oberwälder Land =

Region of Germany

Coordinates: 51°43′22″N 9°19′45″E

The Oberwälder Land is a natural region in the extreme east of the German state of North Rhine-Westphalia with small elements parts in Hesse and Lower Saxony. It consists of Muschelkalk upland, heavily dissected by the Nethe and its tributaries, between the Eggegebirge to the west, the Lippe Uplands to the north, the Weser Valley around Holzminden to the east, the West Hesse Depression to the southeast and the Warburg Börde to the south. This natural region is part of the upper Weser Uplands and hence the German Central Uplands.

== Political division ==
The Oberwälder Land lies predominantly in the North Rhine-Westphalian district of Höxter. This includes the borough of Brakel in the centre as well significant parts of Nieheim, Beverungen, Höxter and Willebadessen. The latter is also true of the Hessian town of Liebenau and to a lesser extent of Polle in Lower Saxony. The name derives from the time of the Prince-Bishopric of Paderborn, when there was an Oberwaldischer Distrikt as an administrative unit. Oberwaldisch meant situated beyond the Eggegebirge (as seen from the town of Paderborn).

== Natural features ==
The deep, sunken Weser valley to the east necessitates a very steep descent for the streams of the Oberwälder Land, which cut deeply into the soft limestone as a result. There are numerous 'box-shaped' valleys which, in the west, flow towards the flat Nethe depression around Brakel, and, in the east, run directly to the Weser and lie at a height of about 150 m NN. The heavily dissected uplands reach heights of up to 350 m and, in places, their slopes descend in steep steps. As one would expect from the underlying rocks, much of the soil contains high levels of calcium carbonate.

The region has a maritime climate, but the individual microclimates vary according to height above sea level. The average annual precipitation is between 750 and 900 mm. The predominant natural woodland habitat is the beech wood.

== Human utilisation ==
The greater part of the landscape is given over to arable farming; grassland is only found on the wetter, wider valley floors.

== Literature ==
- Emil Meynen (Hrsg.): Handbuch der naturräumlichen Gliederung Deutschlands. Selbstverlag der Bundesanstalt für Landeskunde, Remagen 1953-1962 (Teil 1, enthält Lieferung 1-5), ISBN B0000BJ19E
