= Sparrenberg Castle =

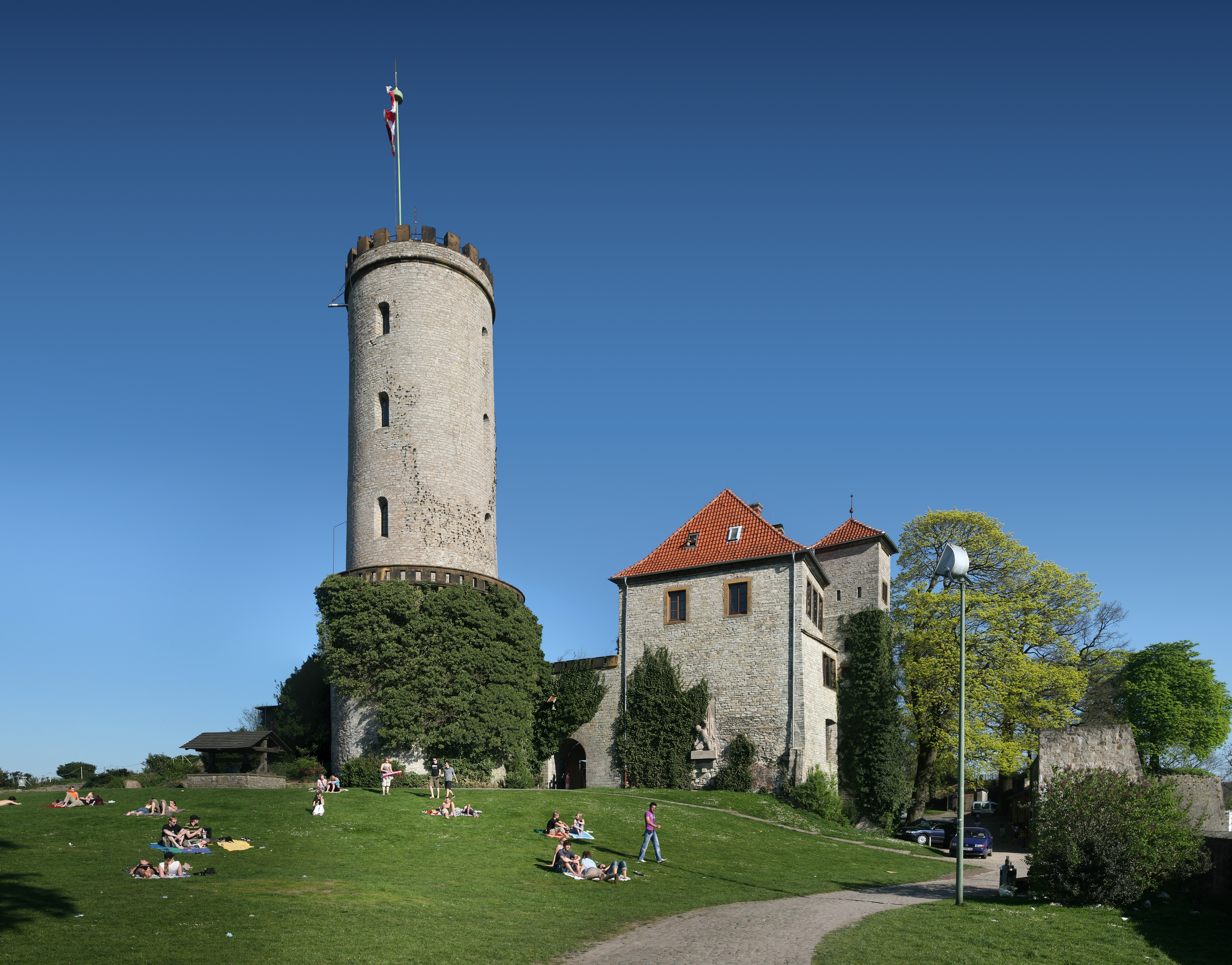
- Donjon – tower of the Sparrenburg
- Interactive map of the Sparrenberg Castle area

General information
- Location: Bielefeld, Germany
- Coordinates: 52.0149°N 8.52678°E
- Completed: < 1260
- Client: Counts of Ravensberg

Sparrenberg Castle, also known as the Sparrenburg (German: Burg und Festung Sparrenberg or Sparrenburg), is a restored fortress in the Bielefeld-Mitte district of Bielefeld, Germany. It is situated on the Sparrenberg hill (180 metres (590 ft) altitude) in the Teutoburg Forest and towers 60 metres (200 ft) above the city centre. Its current appearance mainly originated in the 16th and 19th century. The Hermannsweg, a long-distance hiking trail, passes through its grounds, directly in front of the castle. The Sparrenburg is considered to be the signature landmark of Bielefeld.

== History ==
=== First centuries ===
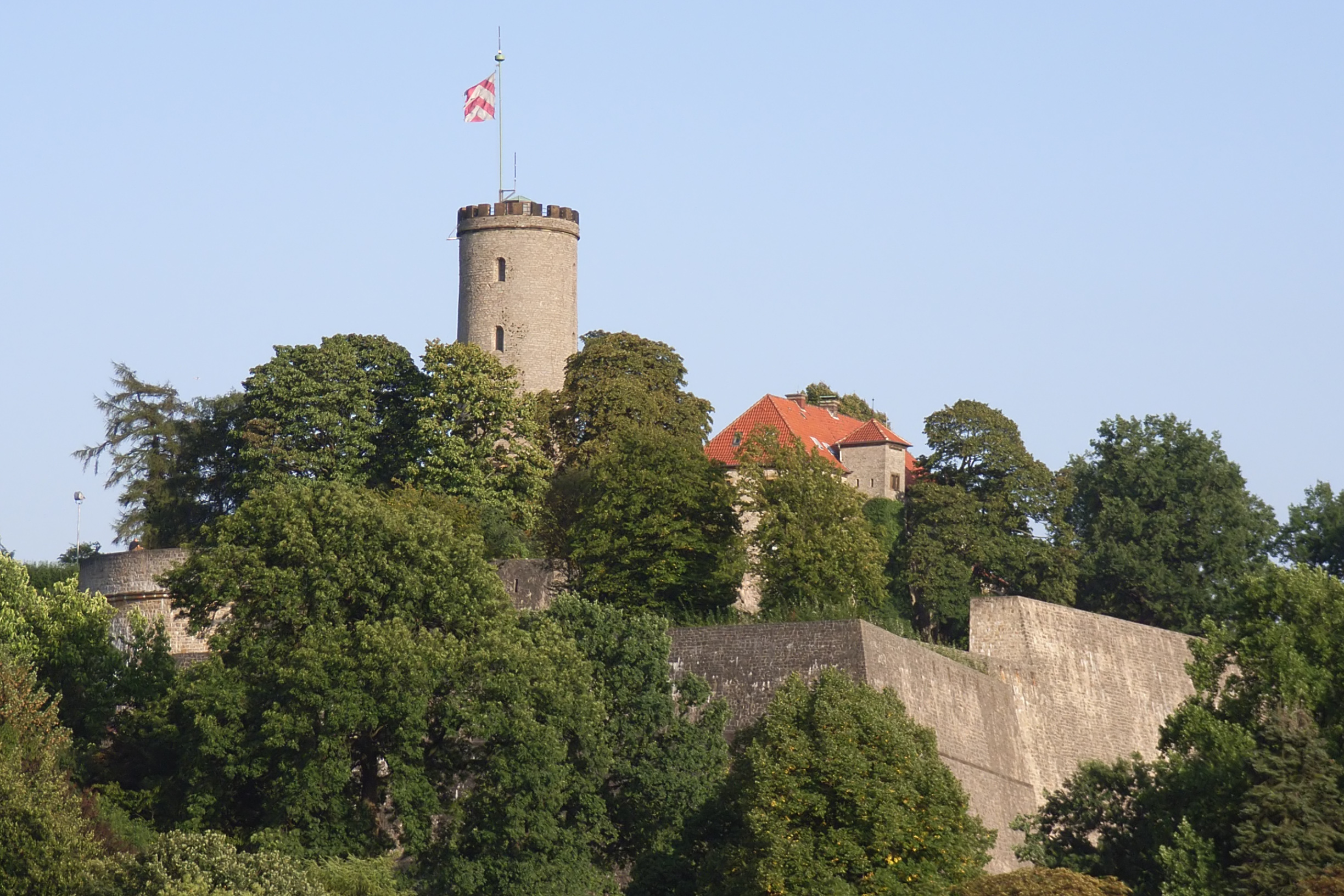
Sparrenburg

The Sparrenburg was erected as a castle sometime before 1250 by the counts of Ravensberg. It guarded the Bielefeld Pass over the Teutoburg Forest, as well as acting as the ruling seat of the counts of Ravensberg, and as protection for the city of Bielefeld, probably founded around 1200. Because the construction of a protective castle generally predates the foundation of a town, it is assumed that there was an older castle. In 1256, the castle was first mentioned in records.

In 1346, Bernard, Count of Ravensberg died without issue and, with his death, the line of Calvelage-Ravensberg was extinguished. The castle was transferred through marriage to Count Gerhard I of Jülich-Berg, who had been married to Bernard's niece Margaret since 1338, and its function as the ruling seat was lost. On 18 November 1377, Emperor Charles IV stayed overnight at the castle. From 1410 to 1428 the Sparrenburg served as a ruling seat for a last time, for Count William II of Ravensberg, who came from the line of the House of Jülich that ruled the Duchy of Berg. In 1511, the Sparrenburg changed hands again. William IV, Duke of Jülich-Berg, who was also the count of Ravensberg, died and County and castle were handed over to his son-in-law John III, Duke of Cleves.

=== Reconstruction as a fortress ===
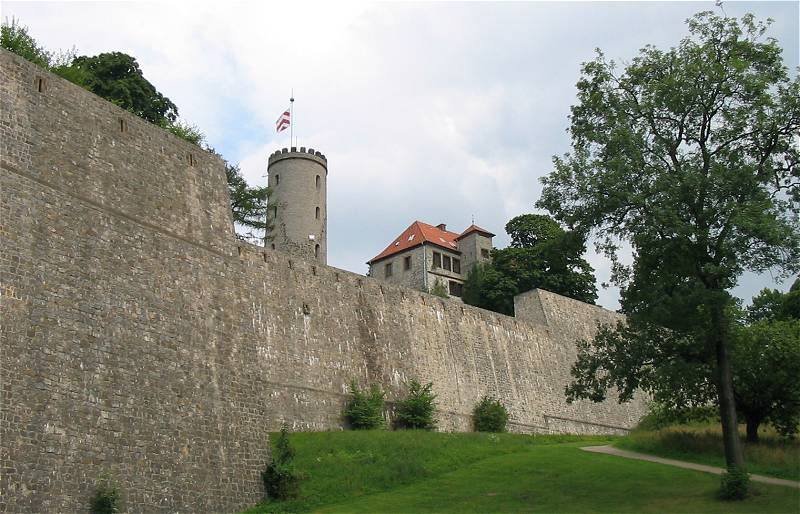
Part of the Sparrenberg fortress with the Scherpentiner

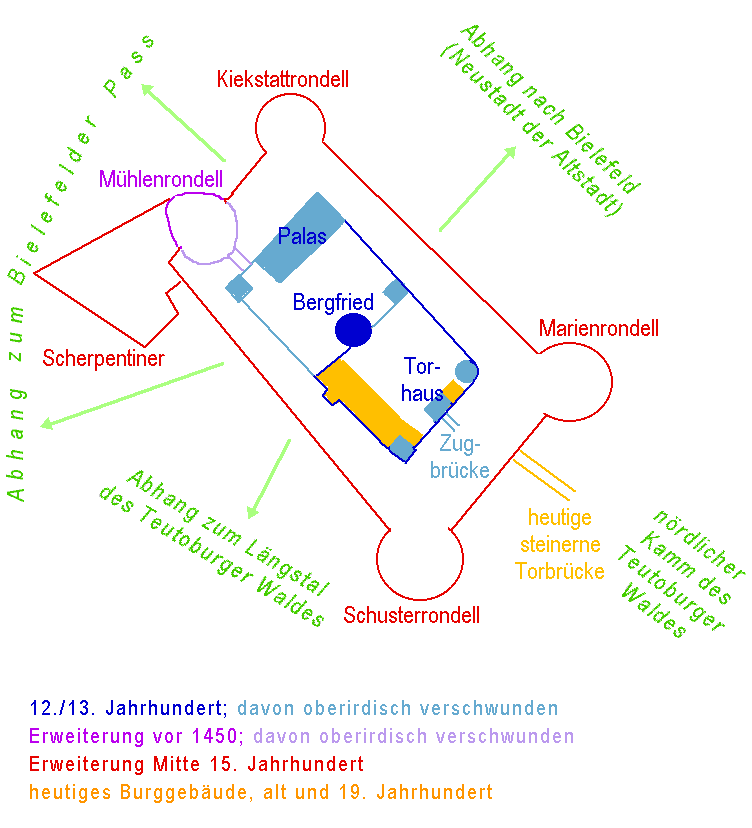
Construction history of the Sparrenburg. The exact location of the medieval castle and palas is unclear. Its location in the diagram is therefore only conjectural.

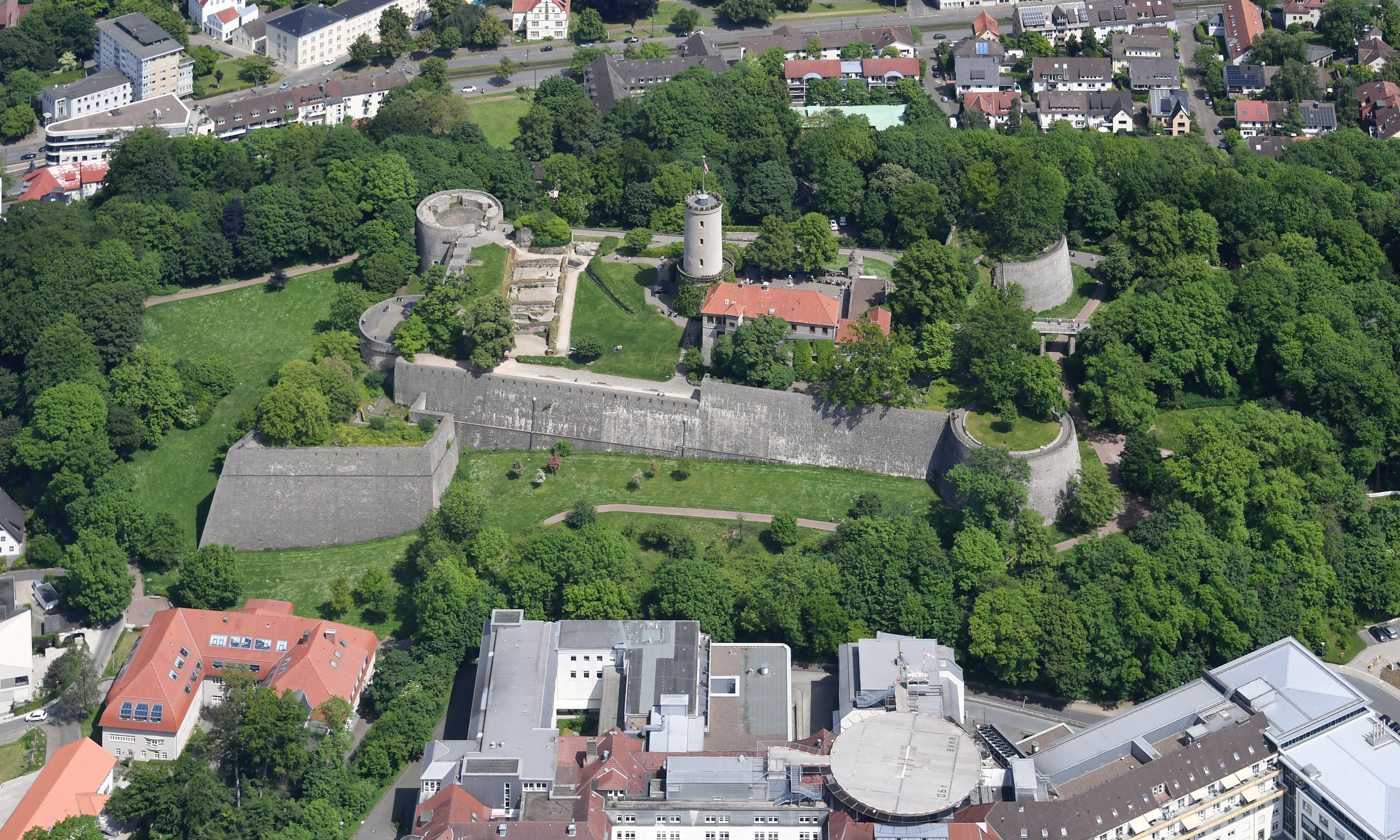
Aerial view of the Sparrenberg Castle

Following the discovery of gunpowder and the resultant increasing use of cannon and other firearms, the new counts of Ravensberg and the owners of the Sparrenburg, the dukes of Cleves, ordered the expansion of the castle into a fortress of the Early Modern Period that could withstand bombardment from siege guns and also employ its own cannon.

Around 1530, a round bastion was added in the west, only accessible from the castle itself via a bridge, from which one could control Bielefeld Pass with artillery.

After some preliminary work starting in 1535, from 1556 on the Italian fortress master builder Alessandro Pasqualini and his son managed the reconstruction, which was finished in 1578 and created the largest fortress in Westphalia. The old castle was now surrounded by a terrace and a high defensive wall. In addition to the original western bastion, the Mühlenrondell, the other three corners of the fortress received round bastions and the Mühlenrondell was expanded into a pointed bastion, called "Scherpentiner, in order to further improve control over the Pass.

The description Scherpentiner can only be verified at the Sparrenburg, its origin can be traced back to the Serpentinen (Serpentin = Italian for snake; German Feldschlange, culverin), which are light artillery guns of the 15th and 16th century.

=== Practical tests ===
In 1609 John William von Jülich-Cleves-Berg, the last duke of Jülich died without male descendants. The collective government, arranged in 1609 by the main heirs John Sigismund, Elector of Brandenburg and duke Wolfgang Wilhelm, Count Palatine of Neuburg failed and culminated in the War of the Jülich Succession. In 1612, the castle was damaged by an earthquake. Due to the Treaty of Xanten, signed in 1614, which ended the succession conflict, the castle was handed over to Brandenburg-Prussia, which immediately granted the right of occupation to its Dutch confederates. The Dutch occupation became effective in November 1615. Years of conflict had subject the castle to war, bandits and arson.

In 1623, in the course of the Thirty Years' War, which broke out in 1618, the Dutch had to retreat before the overpowering advance of the Spanish, led by count John III von Rietberg. In 1625, Brandenburg's colonel Gent unsuccessfully attempted to reconquer the Sparrenburg with the help of Ravensberg's peasants. In 1636 the Swedes and Hessians besieged the Spanish for nearly one year before they had to hand over the fortress in 1637. In 1642, they left Sparrenburg to their French allies.

In 1648, the Peace of Westphalia confirmed the affiliation to Brandenburg-Prussia. In the following years the Grand Elector Frederick William stayed several times at the fortress, and two of his children were born there.

During the Franco-Dutch War the Sparrenburg successfully resisted its last sieges, in 1673 against troops of Münster and in 1679 French troops.

=== Decline and romantic renovation ===
At the end of the 17th century, the Sparrenburg no longer met the military requirements. Therefore, it was partly used as a prison, and partly subjected to decline. The outer walls were torn down by agreement of King Frederick II of Prussia and were used for the construction of the barracks 55, which still stands at the Hans-Sachs-Straße.

In the course of the castle romanticism of the 19th century, the "Comité zur Wiederherstellung des Thurmes auf dem Sparrenberg" (Committee for the Renovation of the Tower on the Sparrenberg) was founded in Bielefeld, and it reconstructed the tower in 1842/43.

In 1879, the city of Bielefeld was able to buy the complex from Prussia for a sum of 8,934.90 Marks, although the original value was assessed 70,000.00 Marks. After long discussions concerning the building's design the construction of the new great hall building was started in 1886 using building plans of the architect E. Hillebrand. On April 24, 1888, the gothic building with ballroom, restaurant, and museum rooms was opened.

In 1900, a monument of the Grand Elector Frederick William, made by Fritz Schaper, was erected in the courtyard while Emperor William II, who is the nominal last count of Ravensberg, was present.

=== War damages and restorations ===
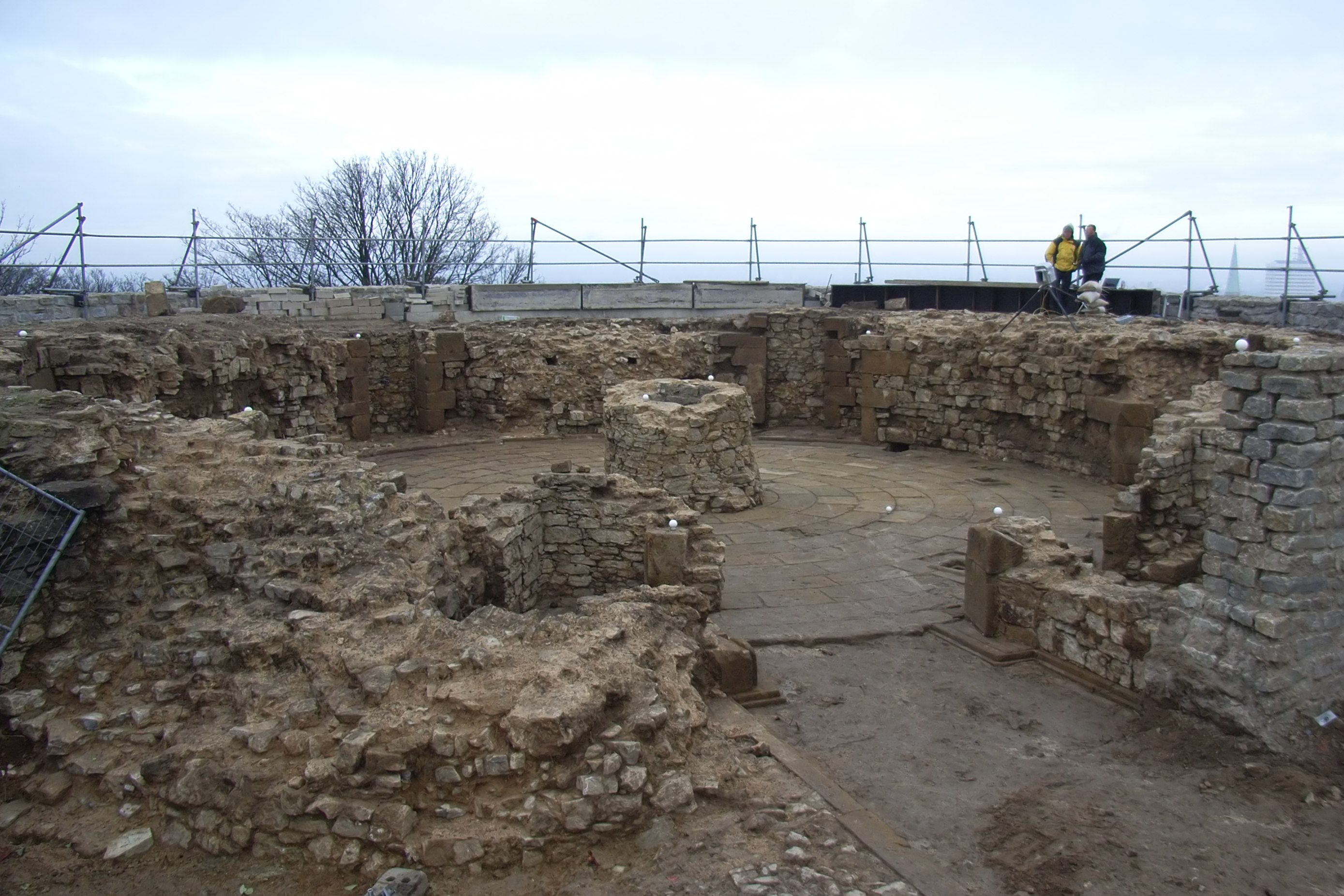
Excavation site at the Kiekstatt roundel

Used as a flak emplacement during World War II, the Sparrenburg was heavily damaged in the course of the air raid on Bielefeld on 30 September 1944; only the tower remained undamaged.

From 1948 to 1987 there was continuous cleanup and restoration work. From 1955 to 1983 the German Museum of Playing Cards was housed in the rebuilt estate building.

During the latest renovations the actual floor of the fortress was found on the northern Kiekstatt roundel. It is 3 metres (9.8 ft) below the current level. Furthermore, stairs leading to the catacombs were discovered. How the restoration should be further carried out is clear as of 2007.

A new visitor centre designed by Max Dudler on the southeast edge of castle's courtyard was opened in September 2014. Inside the 80 square metres (860 sq ft) single-storey building with compressed concrete walls are integrated museum gift shop, ticket counter and kiosk.

== Sightseeing and events ==
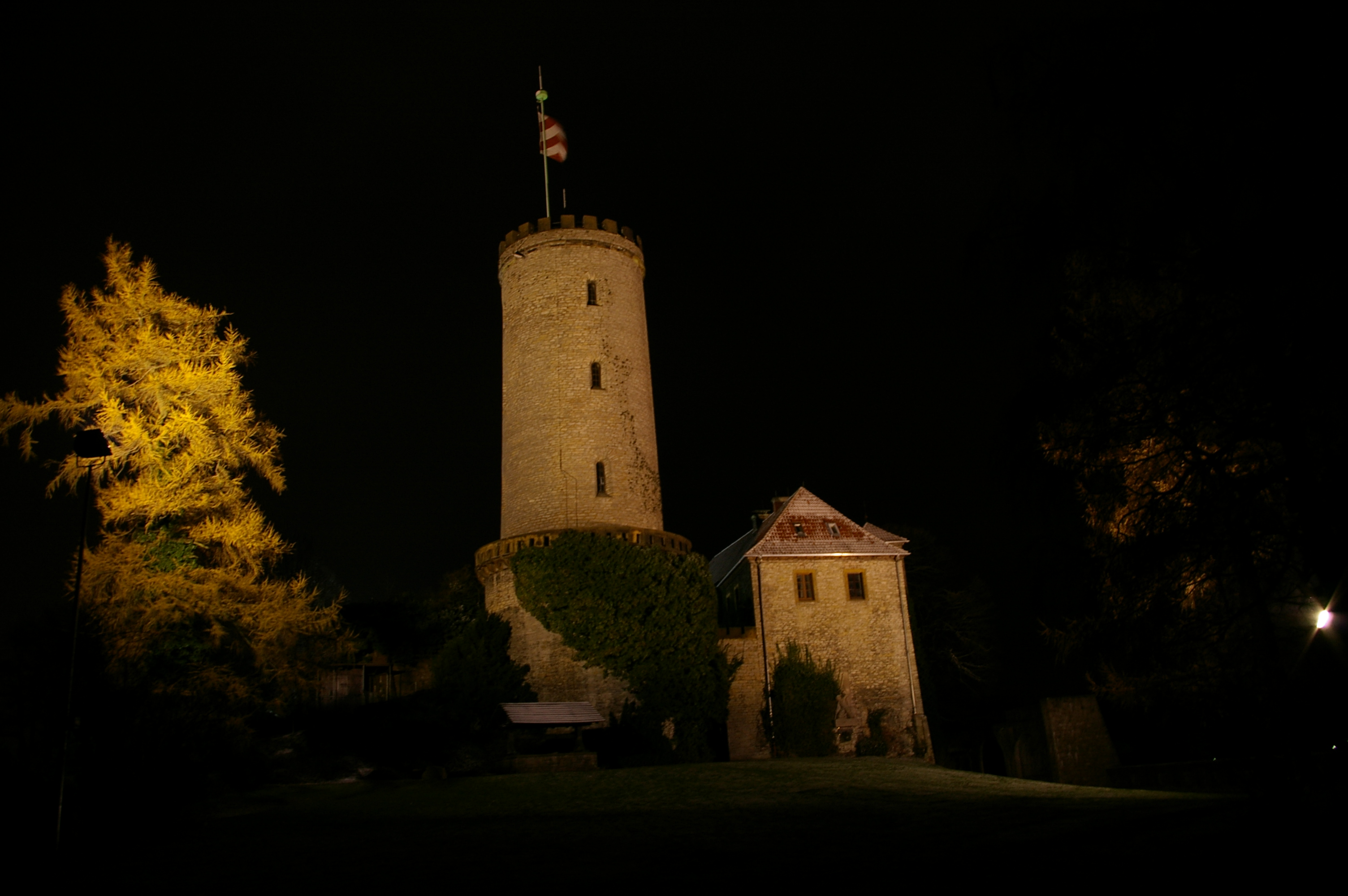
Sparrenburg at night

The above-ground parts of the Sparrenburg can be visited year-round, free of charge. The rest of the castle can be visited daily from April to October, including the ascent of the 37 m (121 ft) tower and the front part of the 285 m (935 ft) subterranean corridor (Casemates). The northwestern part of the underground corridor is not accessible with the exception of three tours per year, as it is home to bats.

An attraction is the annual Sparrenburgfest held on the last weekend of July, where carnies and merchants re-enact the medieval way of life.

In order to financially secure the preservation and restoration of the complex, the campaign Ein Stein für die Burg (One stone for the castle) was brought to life, where a stone of the castle's wall can be adopted for a donation. For higher donations a personal engraving of the stone was possible. A total of 3,100 adoptions were made. The possibility of an adoption no longer exists since the end of 2006, because the engraved stones were used for paving the roundels of the castle, and thus the number of adoptions was limited. In view of the estimated restoration costs of 7.5 million euro Bielefeld's Townsmen Foundation continues to seek further donations even after the end of the adoptions.

== Bibliography ==
- Michael Wessing: Die Sparrenburg. Vom Wehrbau zum Wahrzeichen. Bielefeld: Westfalen Verlag, 2000. ISBN 978-3-88918-078-0
- Carmen Hochmann: Sparrenburg. Geschichte(n) für Kinder. Bielefeld: Kiper, 2004. ISBN 978-3-936359-04-6
- Andreas Kamm: Sparrenburg. Burg - Festung - Wahrzeichen. Bielefeld: Kiper, 2007. ISBN 978-3-936359-27-5
