= Heubach (Emmer) =

River in North Rhine-Westphalia, Germany

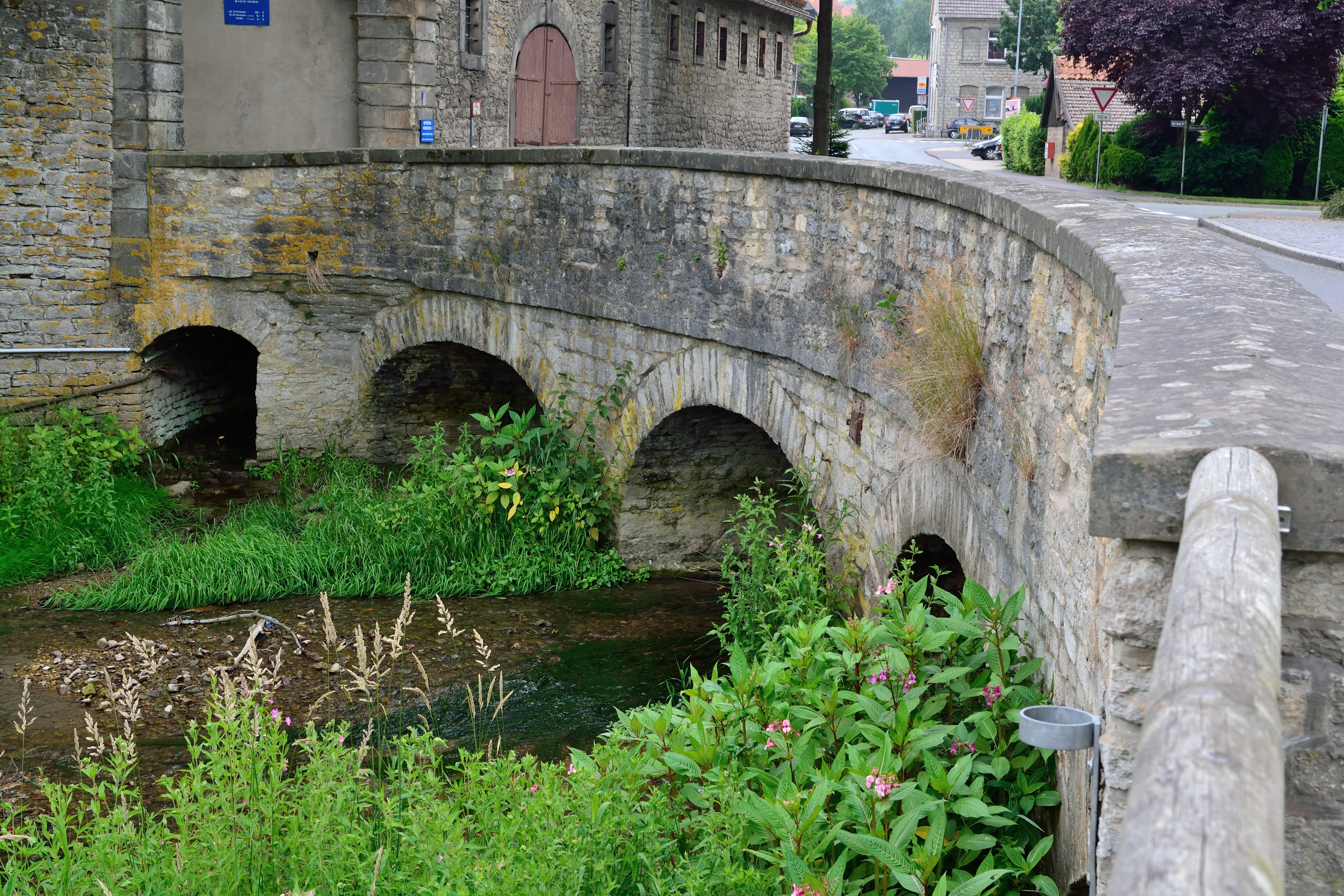

Location
- Country: Germany
- State: North Rhine-Westphalia

Physical characteristics
- Mouth
  - location: Emmer
  - coordinates: 51°51′58″N 9°05′58″E
- Length: 17.6 km (10.9 mi)

Basin features
- Progression: Emmer→ Weser→ North Sea

Heubach is a river of North Rhine-Westphalia, Germany. It flows into the Emmer in Steinheim.

== See also ==
- List of rivers of North Rhine-Westphalia
