= Teutoburg Forest =

Forest in Germany

- Teutoburger Wald
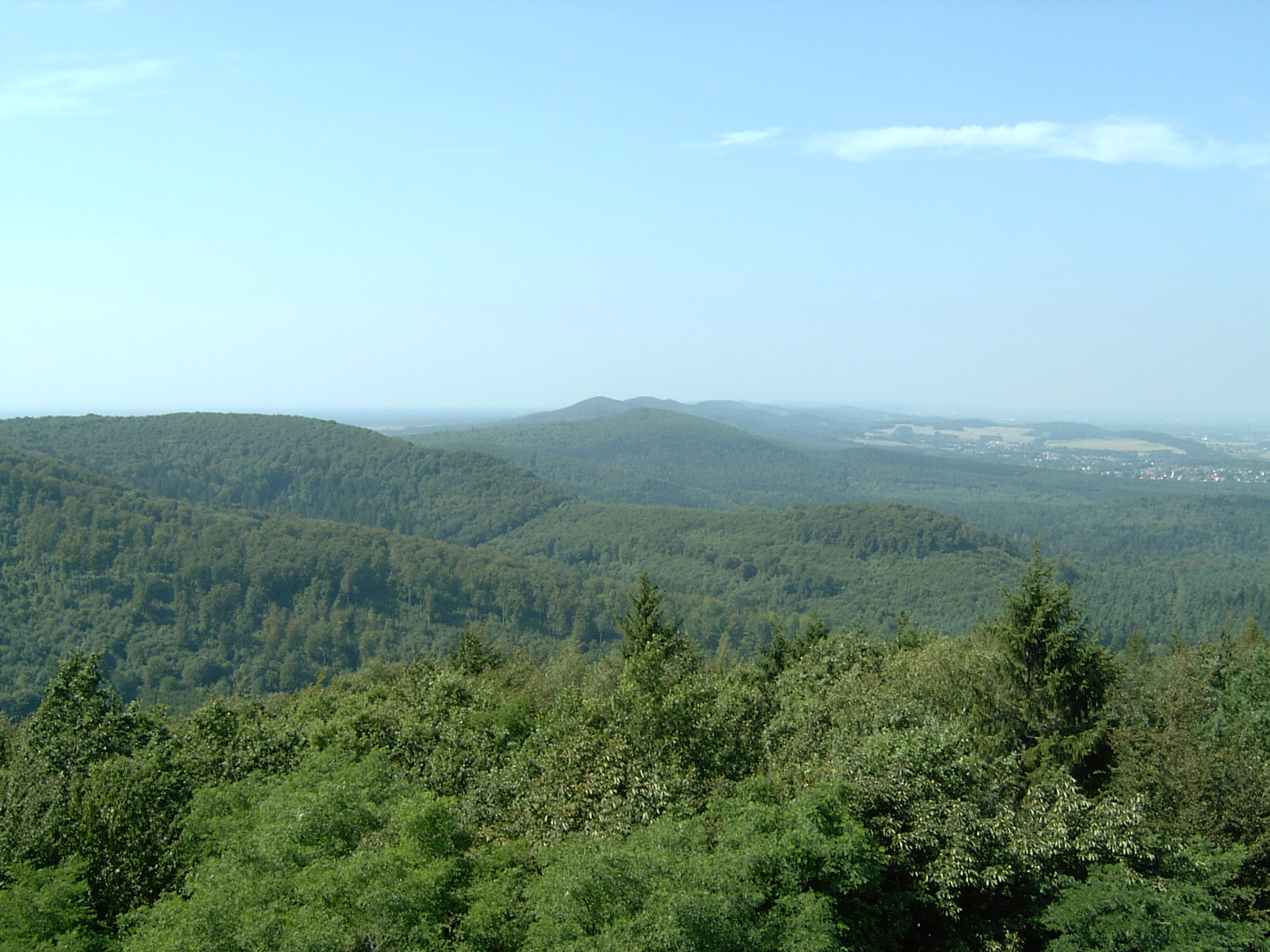
- View over the Teutoburg Forest

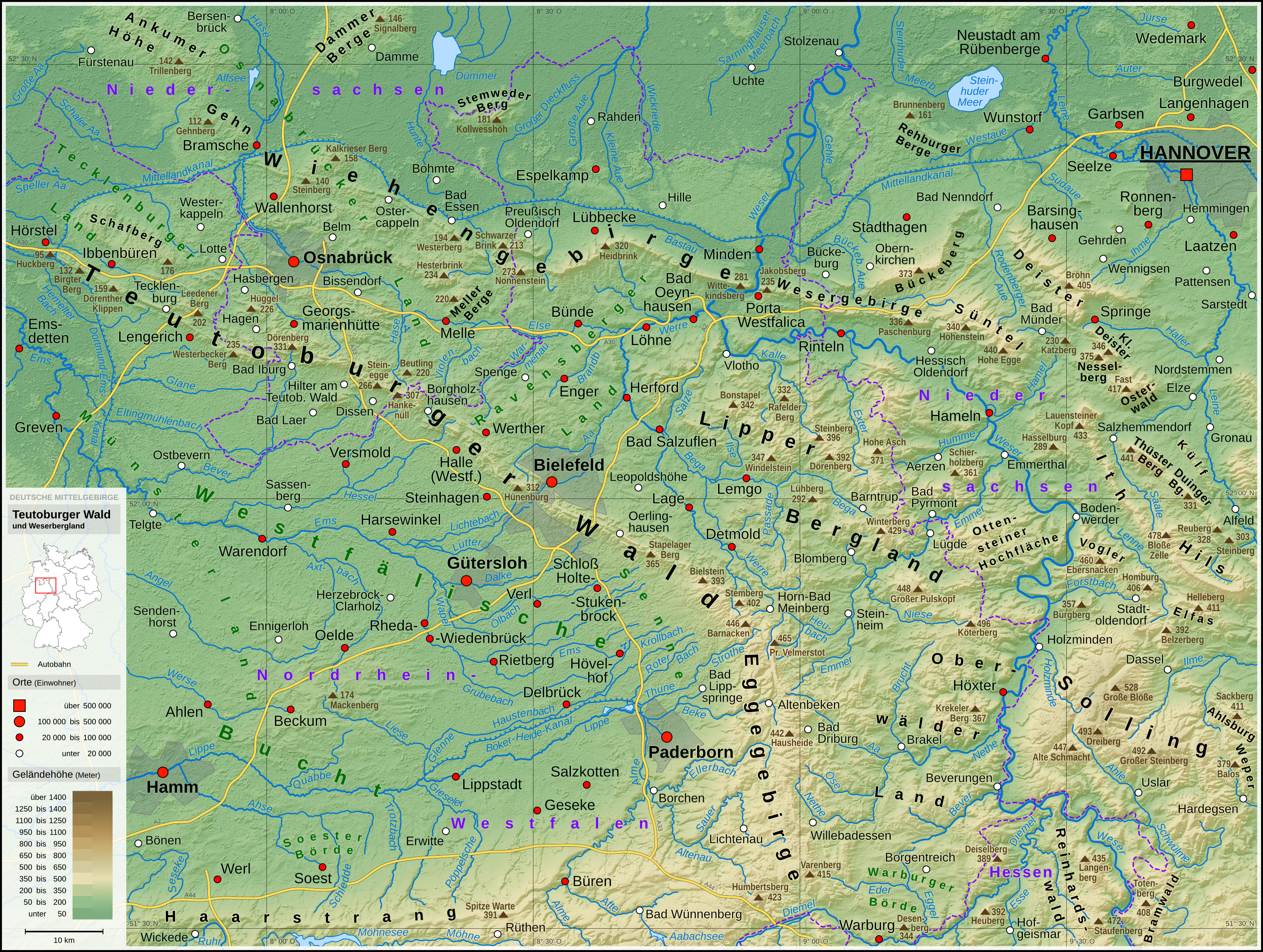
- Teutoburg Forest and Weser Uplands
- Location: Germany (north-west); Lower Saxony & NRW
- Nearest city: Bielefeld; Paderborn (to the south); Osnabrück (to the north-west)
- Coordinates: 51°54′00″N 8°49′00″E
- Area: c. 4,000 km^{2} (1,500 sq mi) almost all of it included officially in one of two natural parks: 1,220 km^{2} (470 sq mi) (TERRA.vita Nature Park); 2,711 km^{2} (1,047 sq mi) (Teutoburg Forest / Egge Hills Nature Park)

The Teutoburg Forest (/ˈtjuːtəbɜːrɡ/ TEW-tə-burg; German: Teutoburger Wald [ˈtɔʏtoˌbʊʁɡɐ ˈvalt]) is a range of low, forested hills in the German states of Lower Saxony and North Rhine-Westphalia. Until the 17th century, the official name of the hill ridge was Osning. It was first renamed the Teutoburg Forest in 1616 in commemoration of the Battle of the Teutoburg Forest in 9 AD, which most likely took place at Kalkriese instead.

== Geography ==
The Teutoburg Forest is a peripheral section in the north of the German Central Uplands, and forms a long narrow range of hills (comprising three ridges) extending from the eastern surroundings of Paderborn in the south to the western surroundings of Osnabrück in the northwest. South of the city centre of Bielefeld, a gap called the Bielefeld Pass bisects the range into the Northern Teutoburg Forest (two thirds) and Southern Teutoburg Forest (one third). In addition, the northeastern and southwestern ridges are cut by the exits of the longitudinal valleys between the ridges.

The geologically oldest ridge is the northeastern one, which consists of limestone of the Triassic.

Most of the ridges and part of the valley are covered by deciduous forest. Parts of the valley areas are used for agriculture, especially the production of cereals.

The highest elevation in the Southern Teutoburg Forest is the Velmerstot (468 m or 1,535 ft) south of Horn-Bad Meinberg. In the Northern Teutoburg Forest the highest elevation is the Dörenberg (331 m or 1,086 ft) north of Bad Iburg.

The river Ems has its source at the western base of the southernmost portion of the Teutoburg Forest.

The southern half of the range, situated about 30 kilometres (19 mi) southwest of the Weser valley, is part of the watershed between the Ems basin in the west and the Weser basin in the east. The drainage towards the Weser is affected by the Werre river. The northwestern half of the range is drained to the river Ems on both sides.

The neighboring landscapes are the Westphalian Lowland in the west, Hase valley in the north, the hilly Ravensberg Basin in the northeast, Lippe Uplands in the east, and Egge Range (German: Eggegebirge) in the south.

Except for a short area south of Osnabrück, which belongs to the Bundesland of Lower Saxony, the whole forest is part of North Rhine-Westphalia.

A long-distance hiking trail called Hermannsweg runs for 156 kilometres (97 mi) along the length of the Teutoburg Forest, from Rheine in Münsterland to Leopoldstal near Horn-Bad Meinberg.

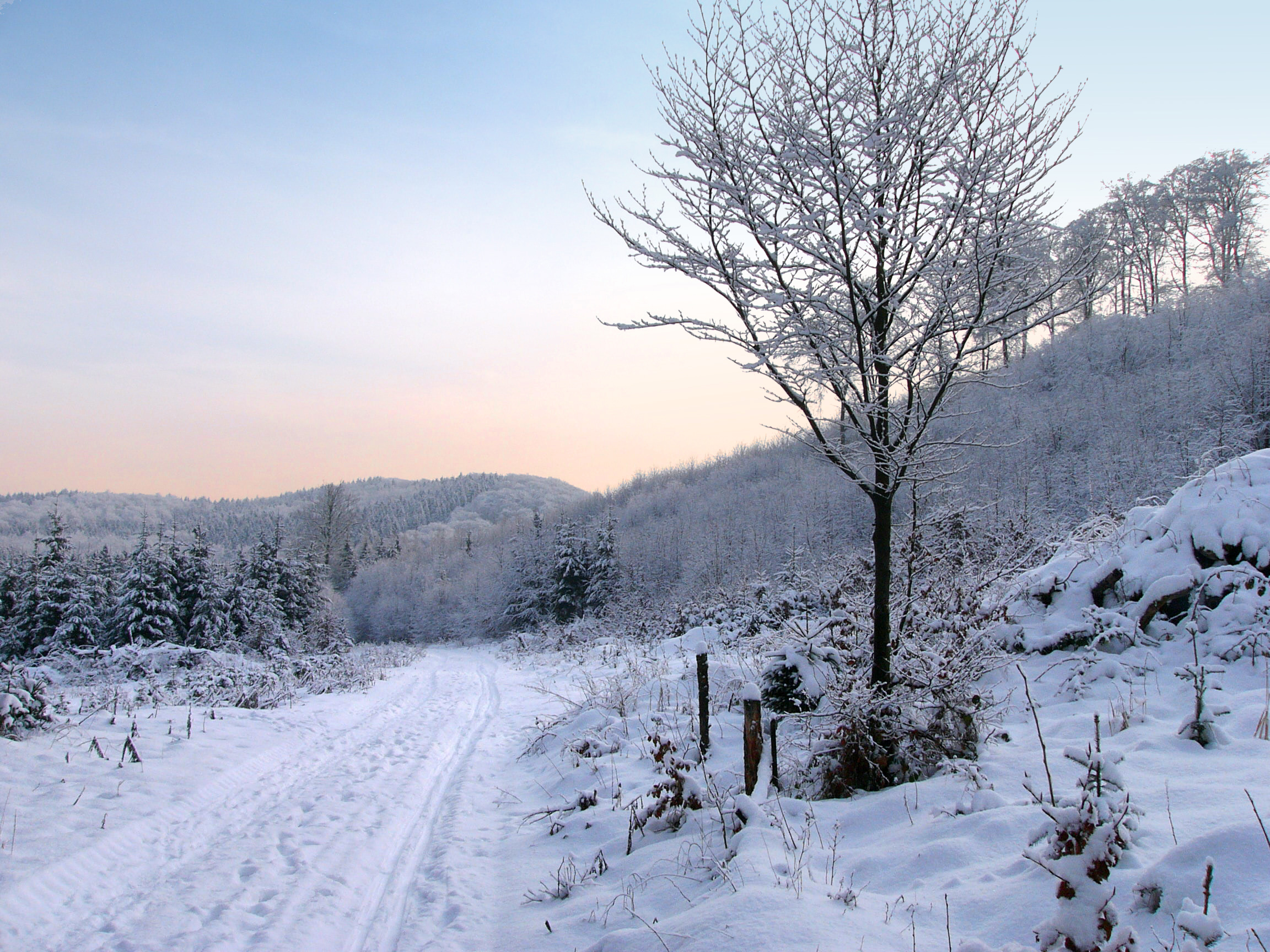
Winter scenery at the Teutoburg Forest

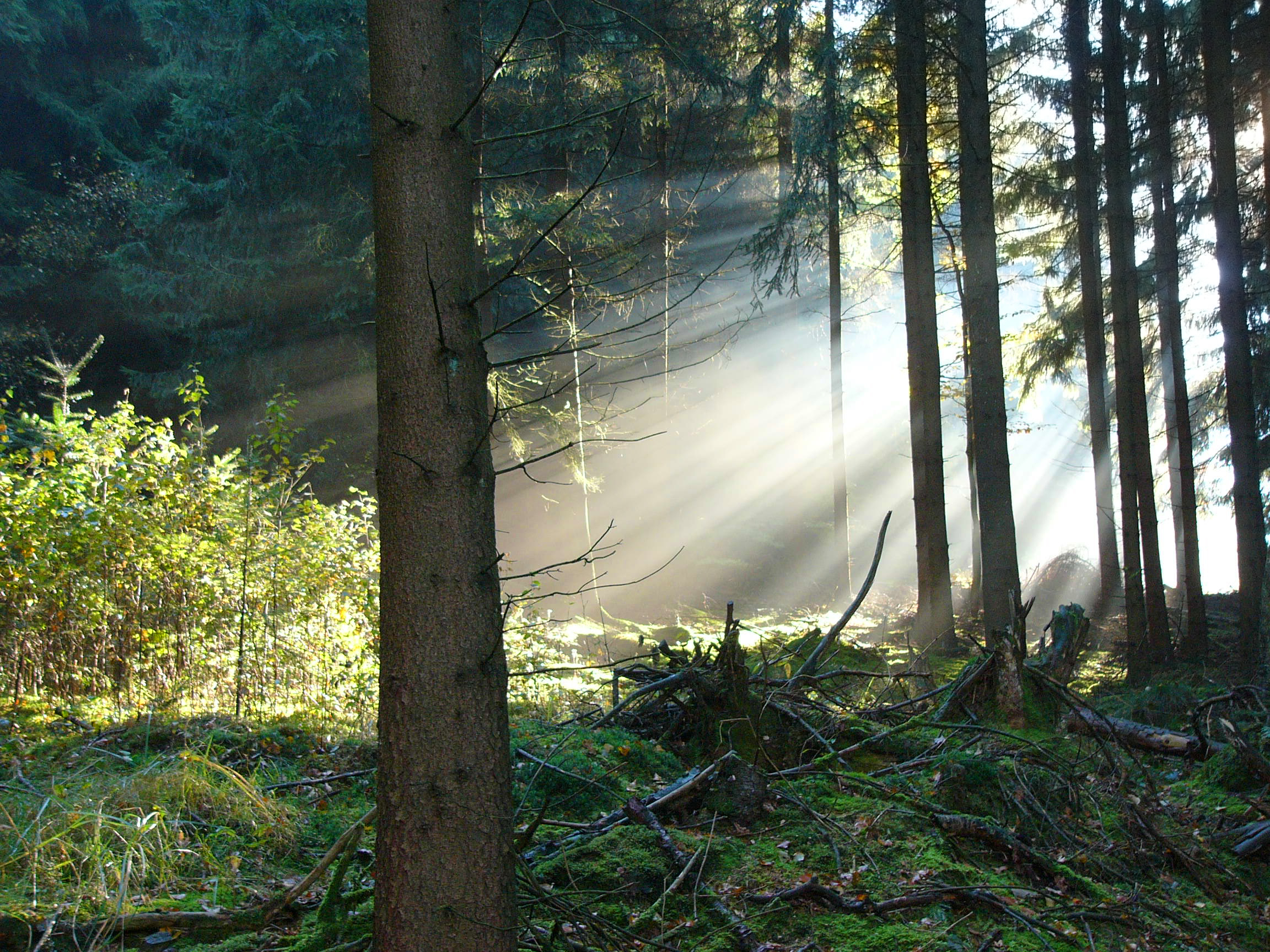
Fall scenery at the Teutoburg Forest

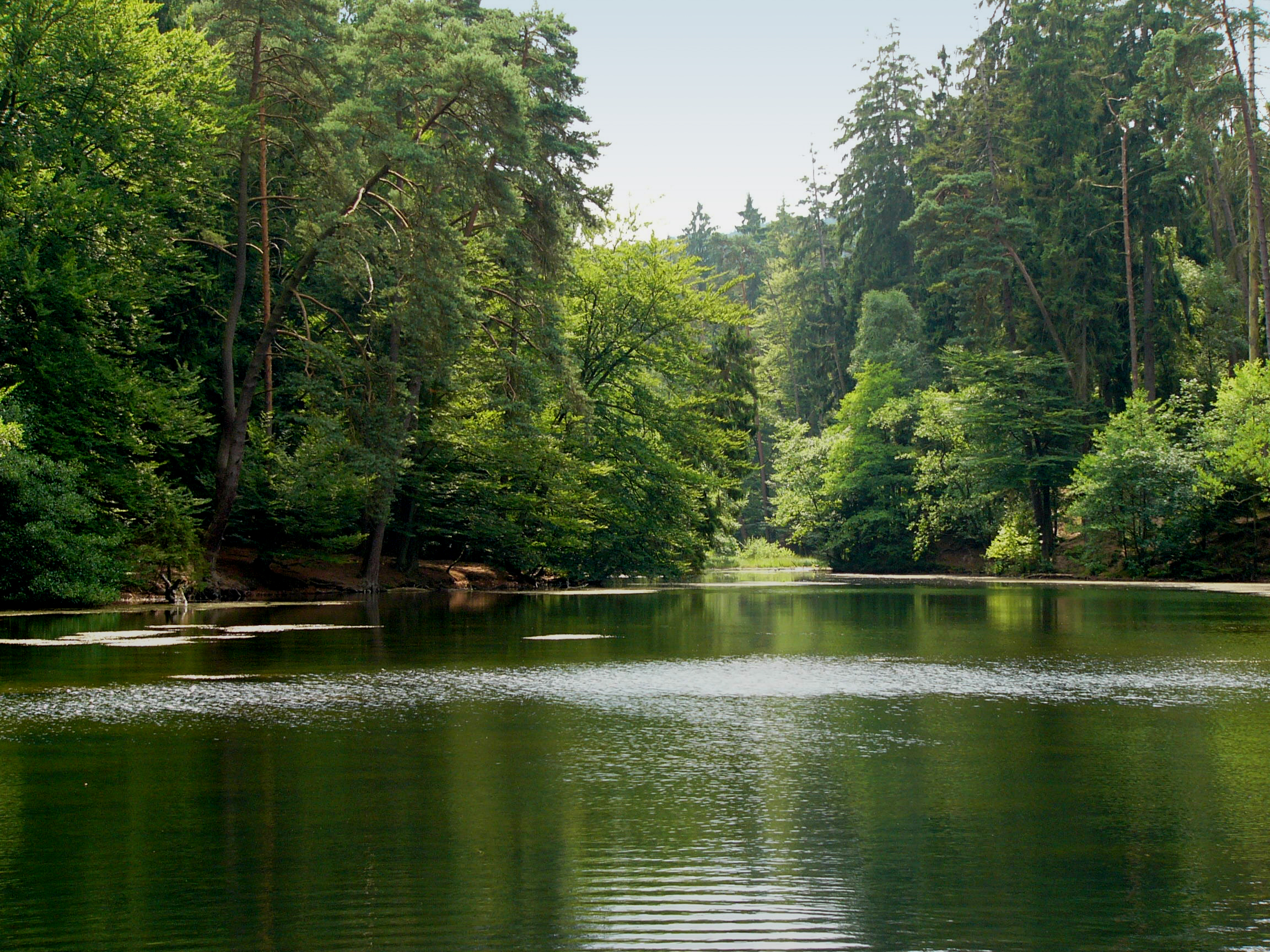
Donop's Pond (Donoperteich)

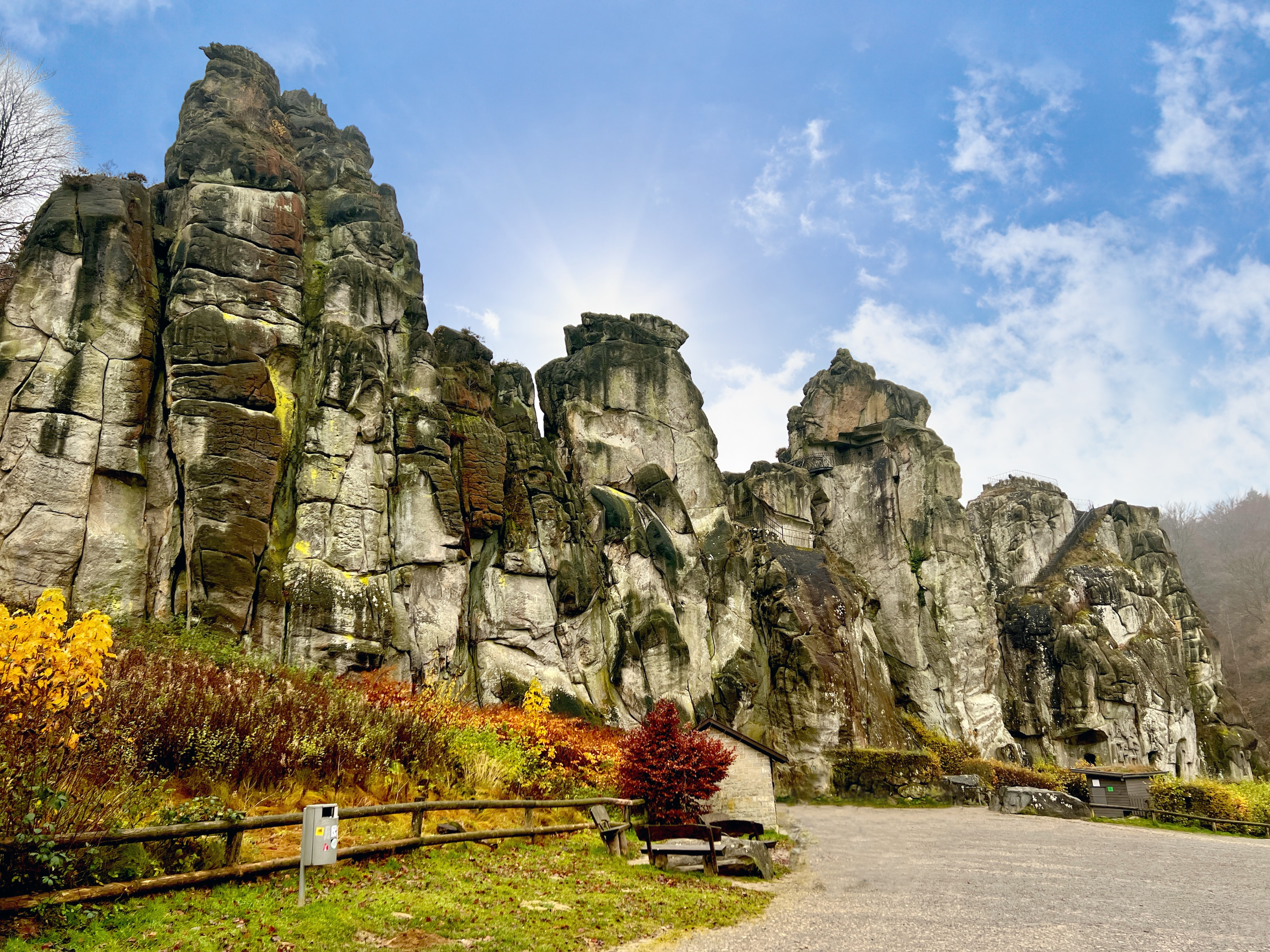
Externsteine

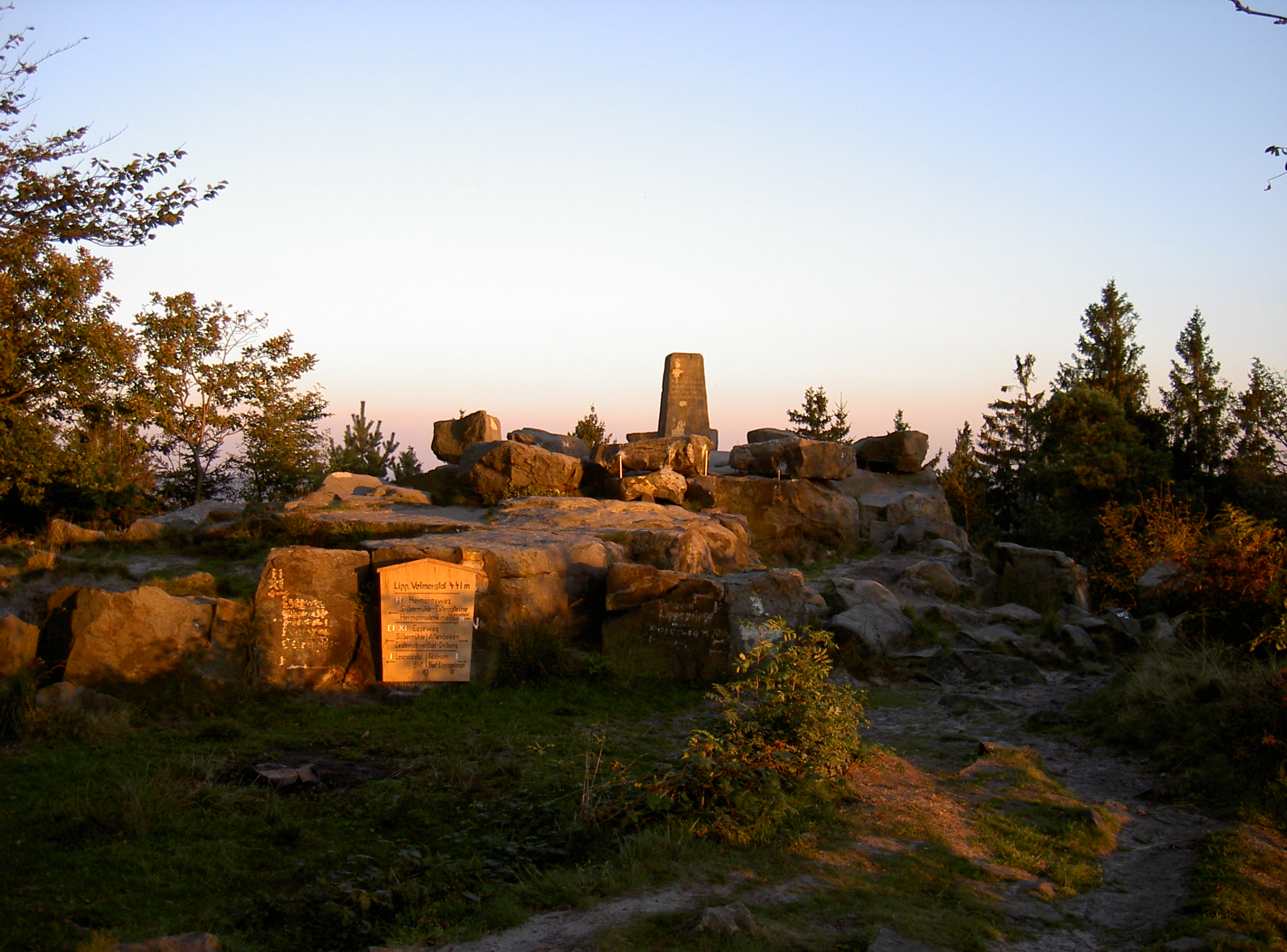
Tip of the Velmerstot Mountain

== History ==
The Battle of Teutoburg Forest in 9 AD occurred in or near this region, though the exact location is disputed. The Roman historian Cornelius Tacitus identified the location of the battle as saltus Teutoburgiensis (saltus meaning a forest valley in Latin). Recent excavations suggest that at least the final stages of the battle took place further northwest, at Kalkriese, north of Osnabrück.

The Teutoburg Forest was also the scene of some fighting at the very end of the Second World War. Lieutenant Ralph Elliott of the Manchester Regiment – a noted Australian scholar in later life – was severely wounded in combat in the Teutoburg Forest, and nearly died before being rescued several hours later.

The Teutoburg Forest is composed of two separate nature parks:

- TERRA.vita Nature Park, northwest part between Bielefeld and Osnabrück
- Teutoburg Forest / Egge Hills Nature Park between Bielefeld and river Diemel

== Hermann's Memorial and the renaming of the Osning ==
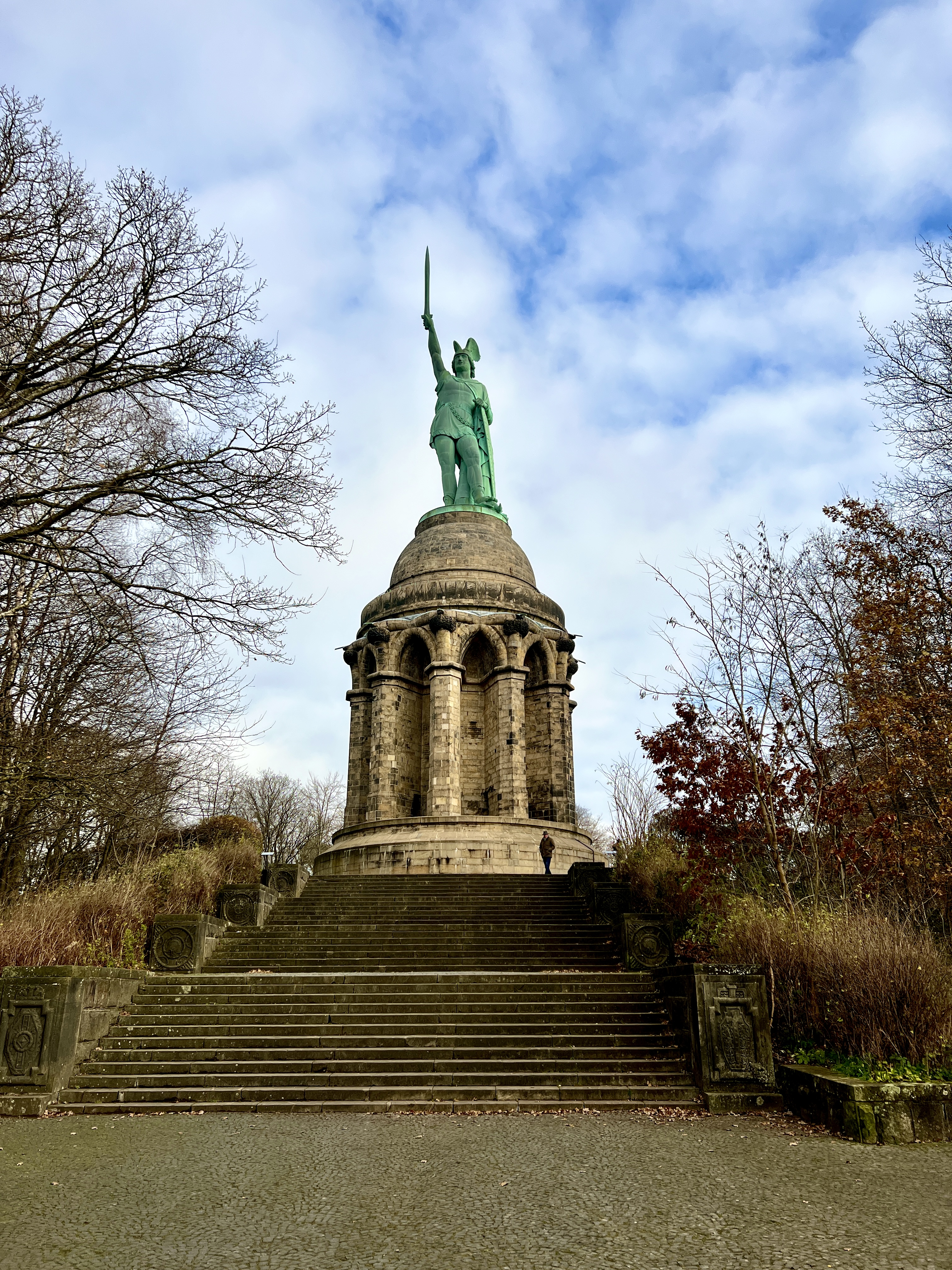
The Hermannsdenkmal

Arminius (also known as Hermann the Cherusker), leader of the Germanic tribes during the battle, became something of a legend for his overwhelming victory over the Romans. During the period of national renaissance in the wake of the Napoleonic wars, German people saw him as an early protagonist of German resistance to foreign rule and a symbol of national unity.

A monumental statue of Arminius commemorating the battle, known as the Hermannsdenkmal (the "Hermann monument"), was erected on the hill of Grotenburg near Detmold, close to the site where the most popular theory of the time placed the battle. Emperor William I, the first Kaiser of the unified German Empire, dedicated the monument in 1875. In order to create a national landscape the Osning Hills were given the name "Teutoburg Forest", see also Teutonic. The first to use that name had been historian and geographer Philipp Clüver in 1616, later it became more common when Ferdinand of Fürstenberg used it in his history and had it printed on maps. However, the old name survived among the local population and the part of the ridge around the Ebberg (309 m or 1,014 ft) near Bielefeld is still known as the Osning today.

The composer Johannes Brahms liked to take walks in this forest during his stay in Detmold.
