= Horn-Bad Meinberg =

- Town
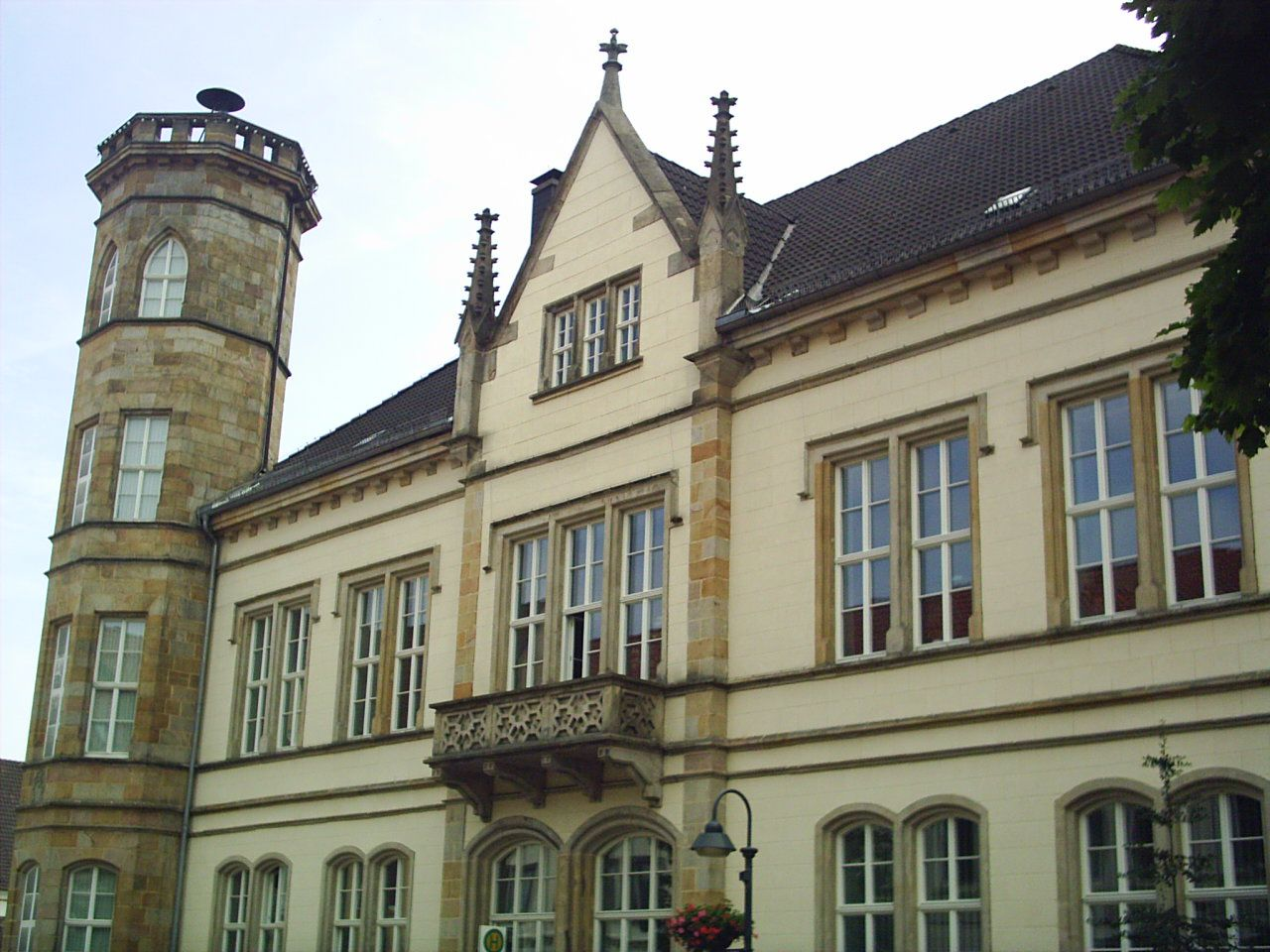
- The Town Hall of Horn-Bad Meinberg.

- Coat of arms

- Location of Horn-Bad Meinberg within Lippe district
- Interactive map of Horn-Bad Meinberg
- Location within Germany Location within North Rhine-Westphalia
- Coordinates: 51°53′N 8°58′E
- Country: Germany
- State: North Rhine-Westphalia
- Admin. region: Detmold
- District: Lippe
- Subdivisions: 16

Government
  - Mayor (2020–25): Heinz-Dieter Krüger (SPD)

Area
  - Total: 90.15 km^{2} (34.81 sq mi)
- Elevation: 207 m (679 ft)

Population (2025-12-31)
  - Total: 17,377
  - Density: 192.8/km^{2} (499.2/sq mi)
- Time zone: UTC+01:00 (CET)
  - Summer (DST): UTC+02:00 (CEST)
- Postal codes: 32805
- Dialling codes: 05234
- Vehicle registration: LIP
- Website: www.horn-badmeinberg.de

Horn-Bad Meinberg (German pronunciation: [ˈhɔʁn baːtˈmaɪnˌbɛʁk]; Low German: Häoern-Möomag) is a German city in the Lippe district in the north-east of North Rhine-Westphalia on the edge of the Teutoburg forest. The district Bad Meinberg is a spa resort. It has 17,377 inhabitants (2025). It was formed in 1970 by merging various other municipalities that had grown together, including Bad Meinberg and Horn - the new entity's original name was Bad Meinberg-Horn, before taking its present name.

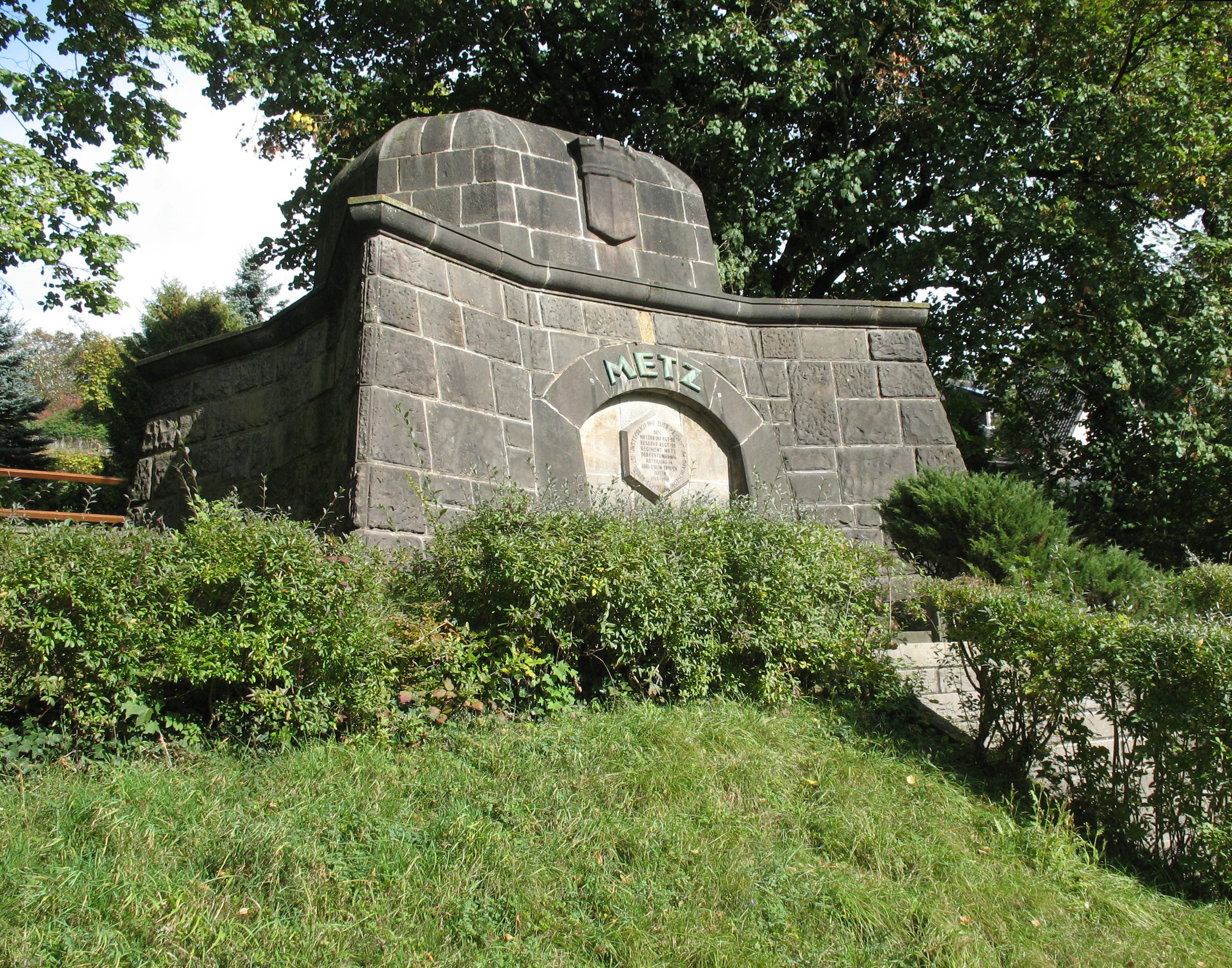
Memorial "Metz"

Horn-Bad Meinberg is the location of the Externsteine, a rock formation consisting of several tall, narrow columns.

== Geography ==
In the municipality are the two highest peaks of the Eggegebirge, the Lipp Velmerstot (441 m) and the Prussian Velmerstot with about (464 m) above sea level and the highest elevation of the Teutoburg forest, the Barnacken with (446 m). The deepest point of the metropolitan area is (125 m). Between the districts Horn and Holzhausen-Externsteine is the most famous natural monument of the Teutoburg Forest, the Externsteine, nearby springs the Wiembecke.

=== Neighbouring communities ===
Starting in the west the municipality is bordering to Schlangen, Detmold, Blomberg and Schieder-Schwalenberg in Lippe. It follows in the south Höxter with the community Steinheim. Southwest still meets the Kreis Paderborn with the communities Altenbeken and Bad Lippspringe on the border with the municipality Horn-Bad Meinberg.

=== Constituent communities ===
The merger of the city of Horn and the municipalities Bad Meinberg, Belle, Bellenberg, Billerbeck, Fromhausen, Heesten, Holzhausen-Externsteine, Leopoldstal, Schmedissen, Vahlhausen at Horn, Veldrom and Wehren and Kempenfeldrom and the integration of parts of the municipalities Oberschönenbuch Hagen (Fissenknick) and Schönemark (Wilberg) formed the newly Horn-Bad Meinberg"

== Horn ==
=== History ===
The oldest known written mention of Horn shows that the foundation of the city was in 1248. Armed conflicts around the city were especially during the Soest Feud (1444–1449) and during the Thirty Years' War (1618–1648). 1761 the town resisted in the Seven Years' War the siege of the French troops commanded by the princes of Beauvau. In 1864, large parts of the city were destroyed by fire, including the old town hall; a new neo-Gothic town hall was built in its stead. A connection for the city of Horn to the railway connection was made in 1895. The station was built outside the city center and is located on the route Detmold-Altenbeken.

== Settlement Moorlage ==
In the east of Horn arose at the beginning of World War II, the settlement Moorlage . Reason was the relocation of the village Haustenbeck in Senne, which was given to the Sennelager Training Area. Many people from the community moved to Horn, where the company Künnemeyer needed workers. The farmers received courtyards of the Reichsumsiedlungsgesellschaft. On February 18, 1938, the first proposal was made to build a closed settlement. Some forty families settled around to Horn. End of August 1939 arrived the first domestic, mayor Wilhelm Mehrmann. 1989 were still 42 of 44 settlement houses owned by the families, who they also built before the war.

== Population ==
Historical population

Year	Pop.	±% p.a.
1965	14,867	—
1970	16,000	+1.48%
1975	16,920	+1.12%
1980	16,843	−0.09%
1985	16,499	−0.41%
1990	17,409	+1.08%
1995	18,664	+1.40%

Year	Pop.	±% p.a.
2000	18,754	+0.10%
2005	18,507	−0.26%
2010	17,704	−0.88%
2015	17,126	−0.66%
2020	17,245	+0.14%
2025	17,377	+0.15%

Source: Landesdatabank Nordrhein-Westfalen
