= Velmerstot =

Hill in North Rhine-Westphalia, Germany

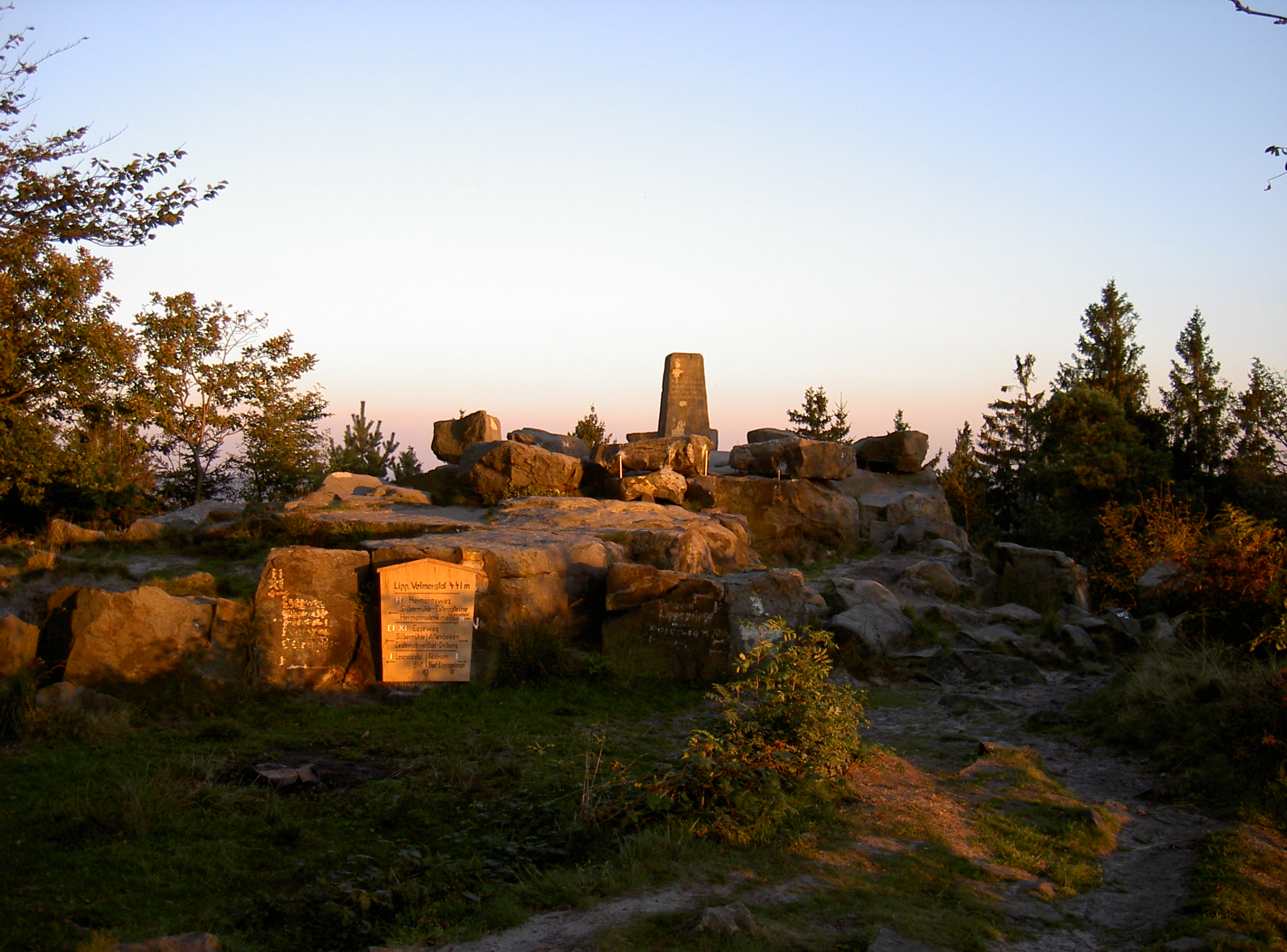
- Lippische Velmerstot and its memorial

Highest point
- Elevation: 468 m above sea level (NN) (1,535 ft)
- Prominence: 120 m ↓ West of Neuenheerse
- Isolation: 25.6 km → Köterberg (Lippe Uplands)
- Coordinates: 51°50′00″N 8°57′13″E

Geography
- Location within North Rhine-Westphalia
- Location: North Rhine-Westphalia, Germany
- Parent range: Eggegebirge

The Velmerstot is the northernmost and highest hill in the Eggegebirge ridge in the German state of North Rhine-Westphalia. It has two summits, the Prussian Velmerstot (Preußische Velmerstot) (468 m), which lies on the territory of Steinheim-Sandebeck in the county of Höxter, and the Lippe Velmerstot (Lippische Velmerstot) (51°50′26″N 8°37′16″E, 441 m), which is located in the county of Lippe. The whole hill is part of the Teutoburg Forest / Egge Hills Nature Park.

During the Cold War, the hill had a NATO and Dutch air defence installations; they left by 1994 and the installations were torn down in 2002/03.

== Literature ==
- Hans-Martin Wienke: Silbermühle, Velmerstot und die Höhlen des Teutoburger Waldes. Schnelle, Detmold, o.J. (1982?)
