= Lippe Uplands =

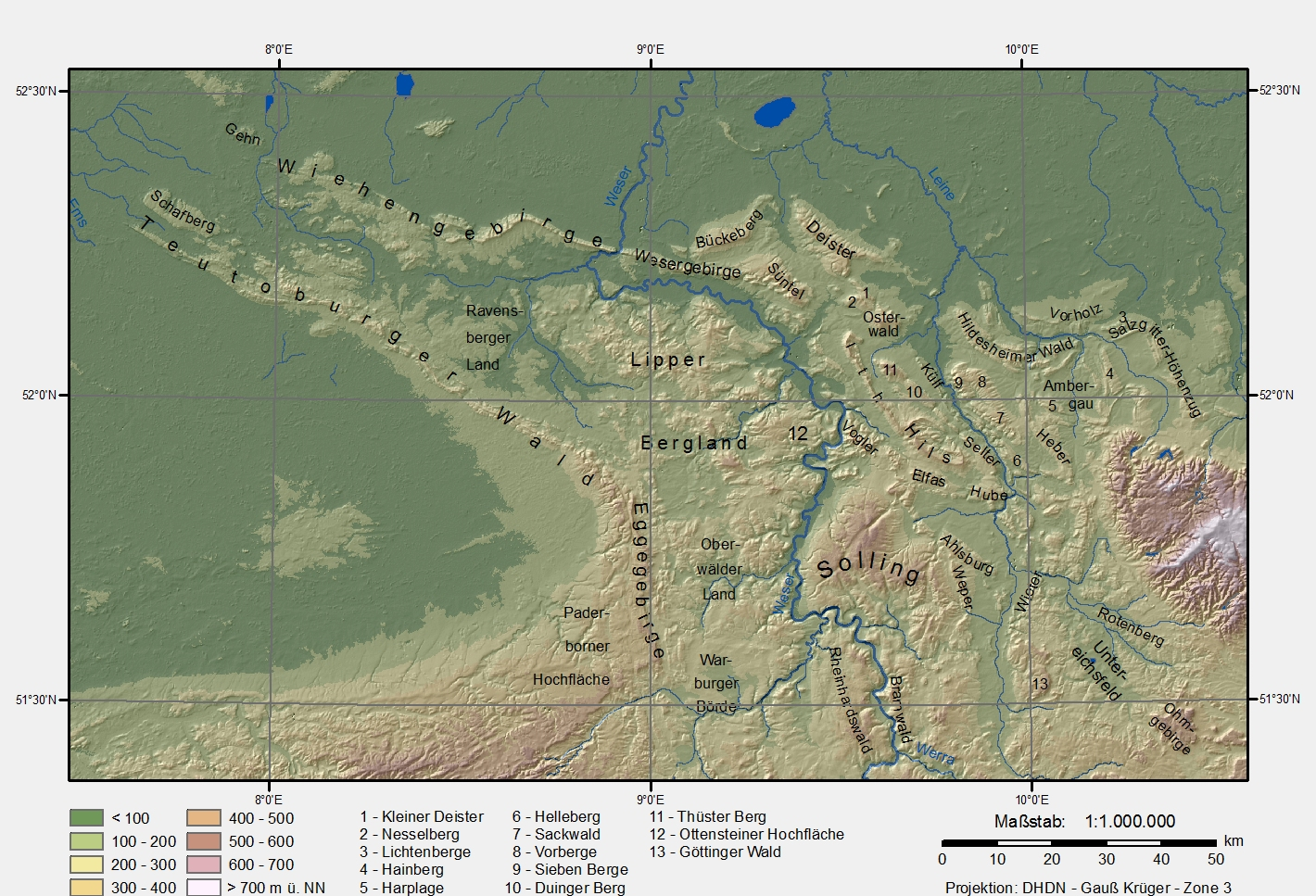
- Map of the Weser Uplands with Lippe Uplands in the centre

Highest point
- Peak: Köterberg
- Elevation: 496 m (1,627 ft)
- Coordinates: 51°51′20″N 9°19′30″E

Dimensions
- Length: 50 km (31 mi)

Geography
- Country: Germany
- State: North Rhine-Westphalia

The Lippe Uplands (German: Lipper Bergland, pronounced [ˈlɪpɐ ˈbɛʁkˌlant], or Lippisches Bergland [ˈlɪpɪʃəs -]) is a range of hills in Ostwestfalen-Lippe within the administrative district of Detmold in the German state of North Rhine-Westphalia.

== Geography ==
The Lippe Uplands are part of the Weser Uplands and are delineated by the river Werre in the west and the Weser in the north and east. In the south, the Lippe Uplands merge into the Egge Hills and the Oberwälder Land. The landscape has sharp variations in relief: rounded peaks (Kuppen) alternate with steep ridges, and flat depressions with hills dissected by valleys. Three larger rivers - the Weser, Werre and Bega, cut deeply into the terrain, the Lippe Uplands dropping away down into their valleys. The highest elevation is the Köterberg at 497 metres (1,631 ft).

== Flora and fauna ==
The woods are dominated by stands of beech and oak. The agricultural land is almost exclusively used for arable farming. Rare and protected animals and plants are found along the partly, almost natural river courses. Some of the rivers are therefore under environmental protection.
