= Egge (Lower Saxon Hills) =

Hill range in Germany

Egge Hills
- Eggegebirge
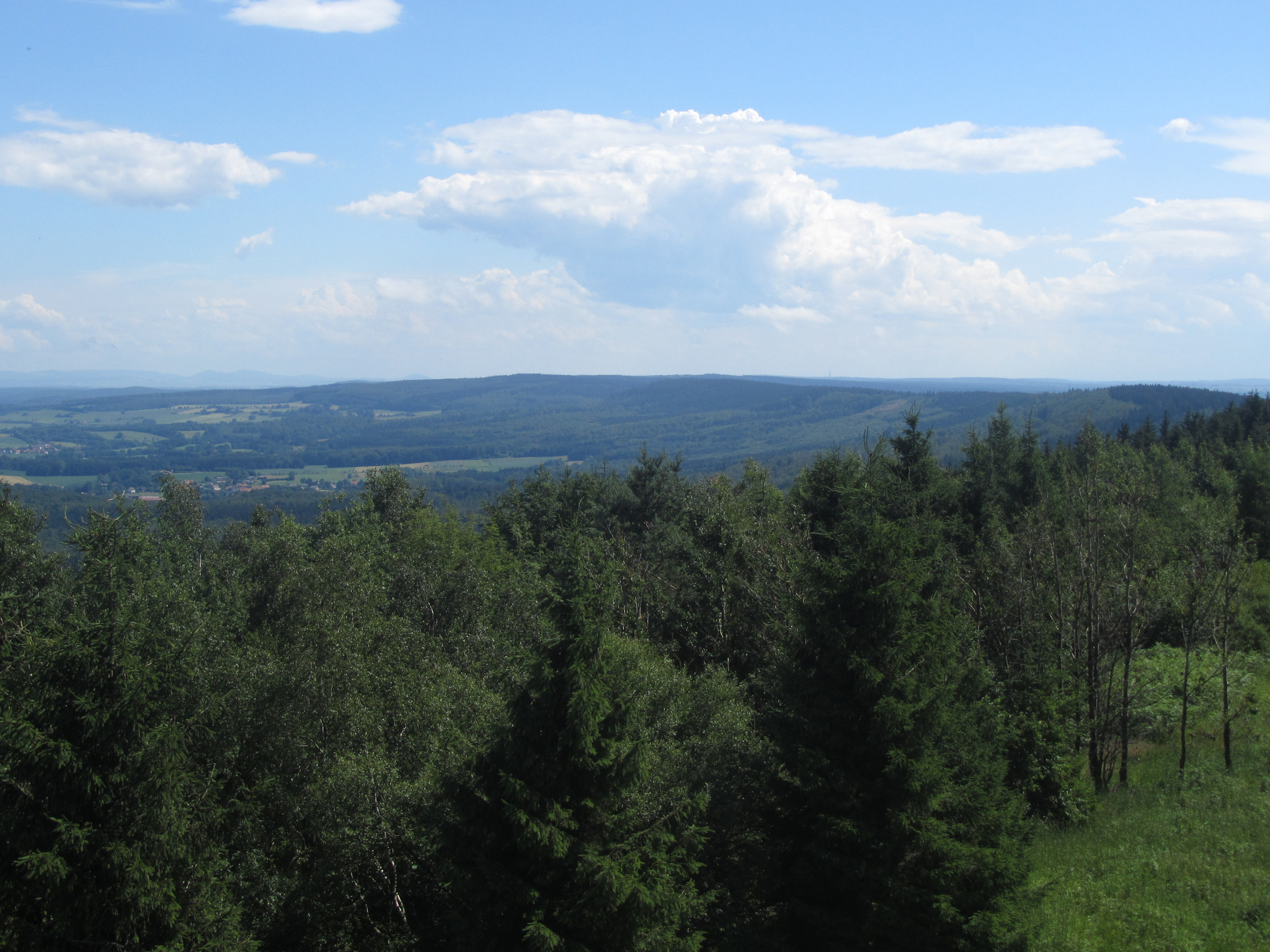
- View from the Egge Tower on the Velmerstot looking south over the crest of the Egge Hills

Highest point
- Peak: Velmerstot
- Elevation: 468 m above NN

Dimensions
- Length: 50 km (31 mi)

Geography
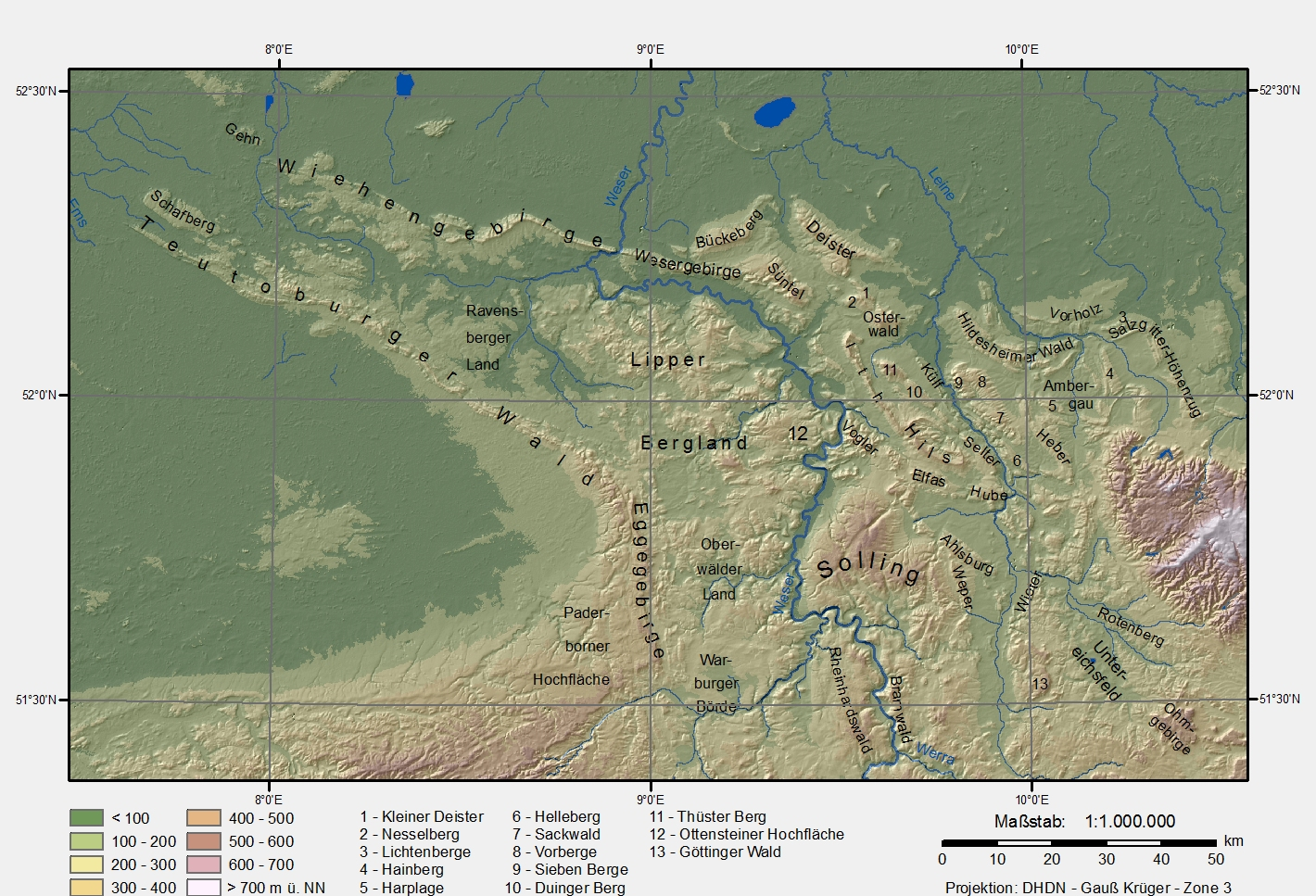
- Country: Germany
- Region(s): Höxter, Paderborn, Lippe, North Rhine-Westphalia
- Range coordinates: 51°44′00″N 8°58′00″E
- Parent range: Lower Saxon Hills

The Egge Hills (German: Eggegebirge [ˈɛɡəɡəˌbɪʁɡə]), or just the Egge ([ˈɛɡə]) is a range of forested hills, up to 464 m above sea level (NN), in the east of the German state of North Rhine-Westphalia.

== Geography ==
The Egge extends from the southern tip of the Teutoburg Forest range near Horn-Bad Meinberg and Steinheim, Westphalia southwards to the northern parts of the Sauerland near Marsberg. Its highest point is the Preußischer Velmerstot at an altitude of 468m. It is part of the Lower Saxon Hills and one of the two main lines of hills within the Teutoburg Forest / Egge Hills Nature Park.

It also constitutes part of the watershed between the rivers Rhine and Weser.
