= Steinheim, Westphalia =

Steinheim
- Town
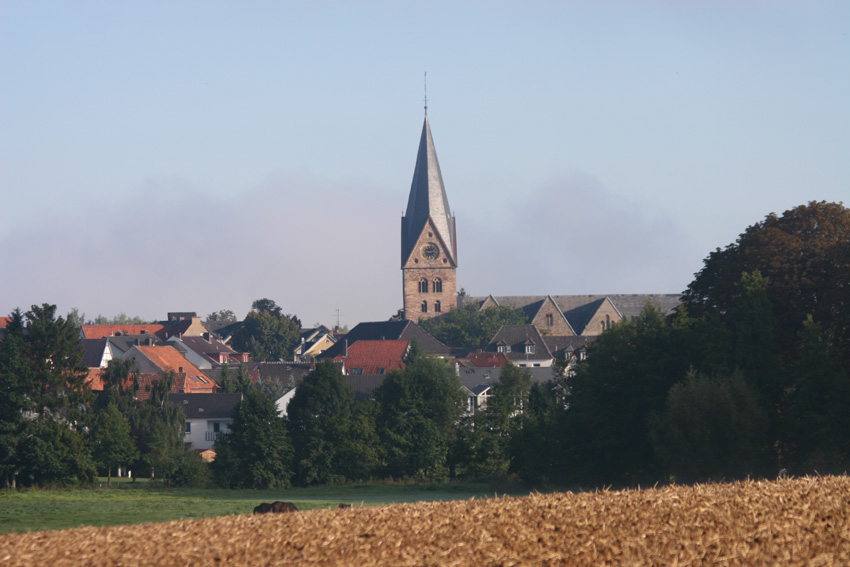
- View of Steinheim with the Catholic Parish Church of Saint Mary

- Coat of arms

- Location of Steinheim within Höxter district
- Interactive map of Steinheim
- Location within Germany Location within North Rhine-Westphalia
- Coordinates: 51°51′57″N 09°05′40″E
- Country: Germany
- State: North Rhine-Westphalia
- Admin. region: Detmold
- District: Höxter
- Subdivisions: 9

Government
  - Mayor (2020–25): Carsten Torke (CDU)

Area
  - Total: 75.69 km^{2} (29.22 sq mi)
- Elevation: 180 m (590 ft)

Population (2025-12-31)
  - Total: 12,000
  - Density: 160/km^{2} (410/sq mi)
- Time zone: UTC+01:00 (CET)
  - Summer (DST): UTC+02:00 (CEST)
- Postal codes: 32839
- Dialling codes: 05233
- Vehicle registration: HX
- Website: www.steinheim.de

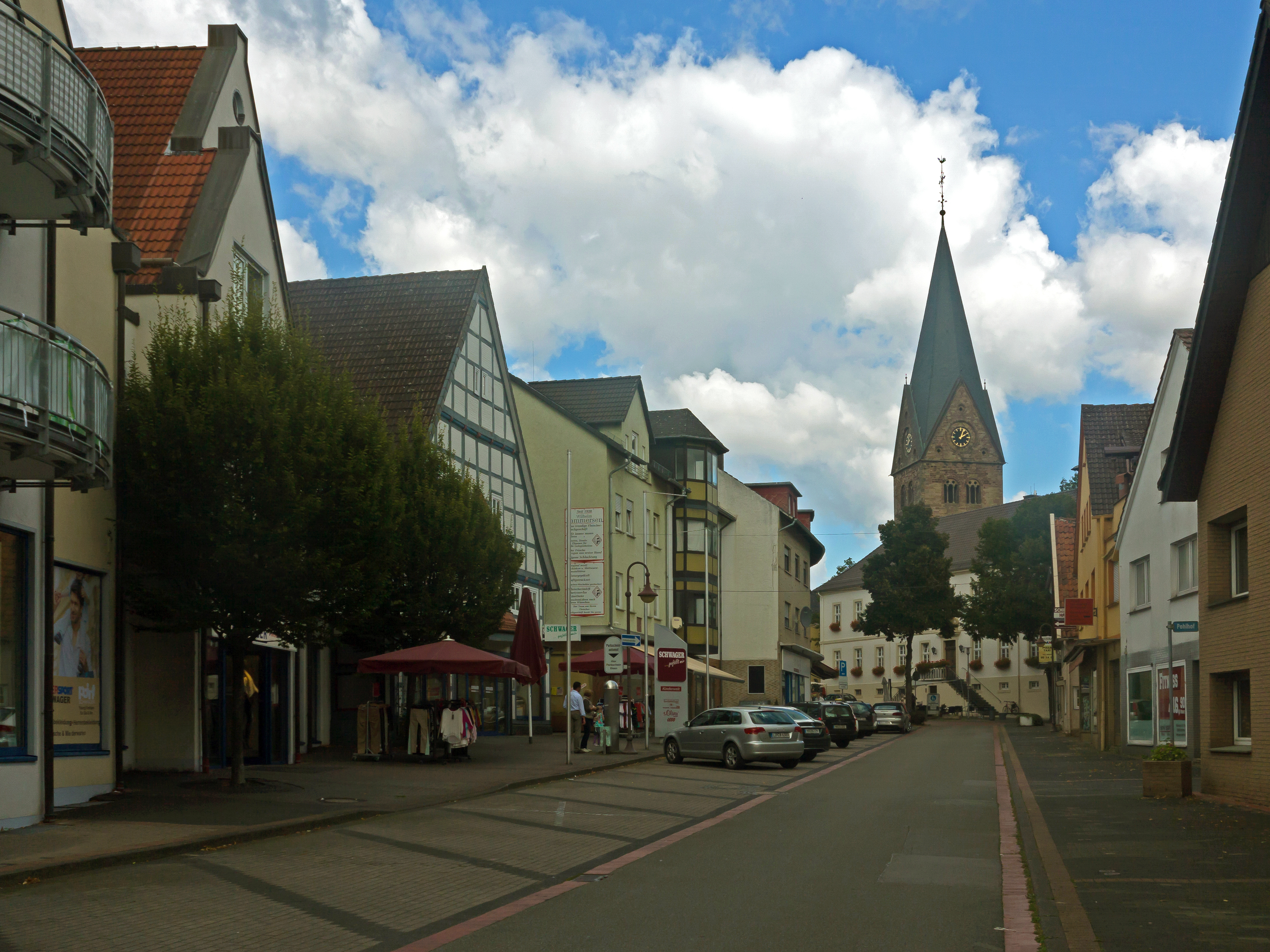
Steinheim, catholic church in the street

Steinheim (German pronunciation: [ˈʃtaɪnhaɪm]; Low German: Staime) is a town in Höxter district in North Rhine-Westphalia, Germany.

The middle centre of Steinheim forms the economic, cultural and social hub of the Steinheimer Börde, one of the main territories of the old Prince-Bishopric of Paderborn. This territory was known as Wethi-Weizengau in Saxon times. Particularly scenic are the foothills of the Eggegebirge.

== Geography ==
=== Location ===
Steinheim lies roughly 15 km southeast of Detmold. The town belongs to the district of Höxter and is situated in the north-eastern part of the federal state of North Rhine-Westphalia.

=== Constituent communities ===
The greater town of Steinheim consists of the main town of Steinheim and eight outlying villages:

- Bergheim
- Eichholz
- Grevenhagen
- Hagedorn
- Ottenhausen
- Rolfzen
- Sandebeck
- Vinsebeck

== History ==
Steinheim was granted town rights in 1275 by Simon I, Bishop of Paderborn.

== Population ==
Historical population

Year	Pop.	±% p.a.
1965	11,569	—
1970	11,905	+0.57%
1975	12,124	+0.37%
1980	12,119	−0.01%
1985	12,014	−0.17%
1990	12,609	+0.97%
1995	13,296	+1.07%

Year	Pop.	±% p.a.
2000	13,981	+1.01%
2005	13,733	−0.36%
2010	13,169	−0.84%
2015	12,922	−0.38%
2020	12,617	−0.48%
2025	12,000	−1.00%

Source: Landesdatabank Nordrhein-Westfalen

== Main sights ==
- The Steinheim Catholic Parish Church of Saint Mary (Katholische Pfarrkiche St. Marien Steinheim).
- The Town Hall, built in 1835, is a plain, two-storey plaster building in late Classicist forms.
- The rectory (Pfarrhaus), a two-storey half-timbered house with a half-hipped roof, was built in 1729.
- The so-called Paradieshof (Detmolder Str. 24) was formerly the episcopal financial officer's (Rentmeister) seat. It was built in 1729 with a half-hipped roof. Renovated in 1995-96, the building has been used since that time as a kindergarten, daycare centre and shelter on the parental initiative Klabautermann e.V.
- The nearby Rentmeisterhaus (Detmolder Str. 28) presents itself as a late Baroque heptaxial plaster (half-timbered?) building with middle risalit and Mansard roof. It was built in 1767. It still has its original front door.
- In the town core after the renovations in the 1970s and 1980s, only a few older residential houses had been kept. As a rule, this usually meant plain half-timbered Dielenhäuser (wide, open houses with a high hallways) almost all of which had been built after the devastating town fire in 1729. Especially well preserved is Rochusstraße 22, a half-timbered Dielenhaus from 1729.
- Of the town wall, built beginning in 1280, one rather lengthy stretch has been preserved on the street "Hinter der Mauer" ("Behind the Wall").

== Cultural events ==
- Steinheim's Rosenmontagszug – a colourful parade – is the biggest and oldest in the East Westphalia-Lippe region. Also, the Steinheim shooting festival, held every year in early summer, enjoys great popularity.

== Politics ==
=== Town council ===
Town council's 26 seats are apportioned as follows, in accordance with municipal elections held on 26 September 2004:

- CDU 12 seats
- SPD 6 seats
- Greens 3 seats
- UWG 5 seats

Note: UWG is a citizens' coalition.

=== Mayors ===
At the 2015 municipal elections, the new mayor Carsten Torke (CDU) was elected with an absolute majority, succeeding the previous mayor Joachim Franzke (CDU). Torke was re-elected in 2020.

=== Coat of arms ===
Steinheim's civic coat of arms might heraldically be described thus: In argent a wall with three crenellated towers, the middle tower higher than the two flanking, gules, in the wall below the middle tower a gate Or.

Steinheim's oldest town seal, from the 15th century, shows the wall with the three towers, but not the gate. The wall and towers have figured on all seals since that time, but some seals showed the gate, and others did not. Arms were officially granted the town on 23 March 1908, and showed only the wall and towers, not the gate. On 22 March 1971, the town adopted a new coat of arms whose composition was roughly the same, but it included a narrow green chief (stripe across the top). These arms soon yielded to the present arms when a disagreement arose over the new arms, with the council opposing the new blazon that included the green chief.

The current arms were adopted on 3 July 1972.

== Economy and infrastructure ==
=== Transport ===
Owing to Steinheim's advantageous location on the north-south-running East Westphalia Road (Ostwestfalenstraße), otherwise known as Federal Highway (Bundesstraße) B252, connections to the B1 (Paderborn-Ruhr area) and Autobahnen A 2 (Hanover-Ruhr area) and A 44 (Dortmund-Kassel) are right at hand.

Steinheim can also be reached by rail throughout the day, with hourly trains from both Hanover and Paderborn.

=== Education ===
Steinheim has several kindergartens and daycare centres, two primary schools, one special school, a Realschule and a Gymnasium. Till 2011 Steinheim also had a Hauptschule.

== Town partnerships ==
Steinheim maintains partnership links with the following places :

- Busko-Zdrój, Poland
- Haukipudas, Finland
- (Democratic Republic of the Congo) Kalemie, DRC
- Specchia, Italy
- Szigetszentmiklós, Hungary
