= Friedrich Staphylus =

German theologian

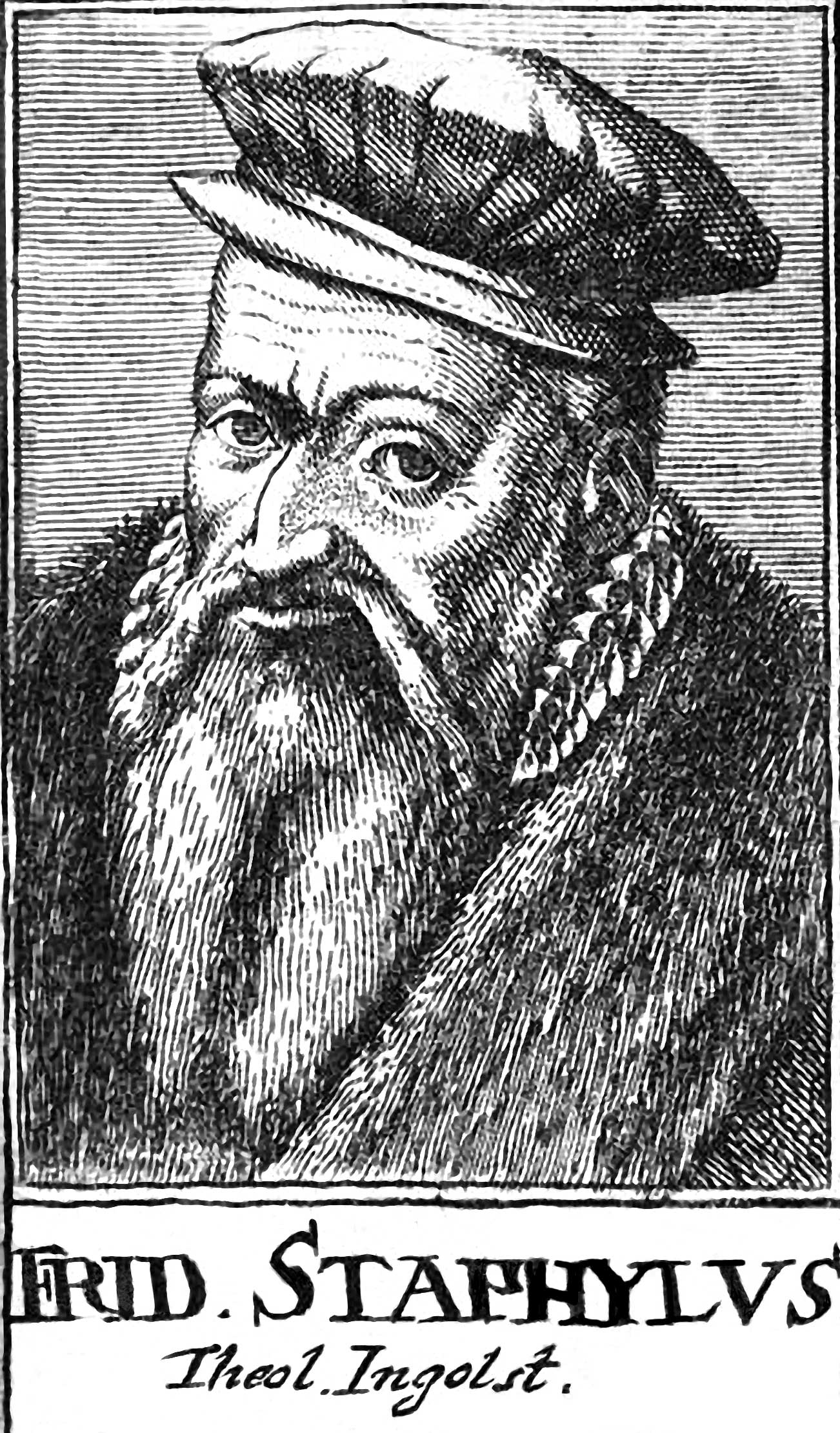
A contemporary engraving of "Friedrich Staphylus, theologian of Ingolstadt".

Friedrich Staphylus (Lat. Fridericus) (27 August 1512 – 5 March 1564) was a German theologian, at first a Lutheran Protestant and then a Catholic convert.

== Biography ==
Staphylus was born at Osnabrück. His father, Ludeke Stapellage, was an official of the Bishop of Osnabrück. Left an orphan at an early age, he came under the care of an uncle at Danzig, then went to Lithuania and studied at Kraków, after which he studied theology and philosophy at Padua.

About 1536 he went to Wittenberg, obtained the Degree of magister artium in 1541 and at Melanchthon's recommendation became a tutor in the family of the Count of Eberstein. In 1546 Duke Albert of Prussia appointed Staphylus professor of theology at the new University of Königsberg, which the duke had founded in 1544.

At this time Staphylus was still under the influence of Martin Luther's opinions, as is shown by his academic disputation upon the doctrine of justification, De justificationis articulo. However, at his installation as professor he obtained the assurance that he need not remain if the duke tolerated errors which "might be contrary to the Holy Scriptures and the primitivæ apostolicæ et catholicæ ecclesiæ consensum". This shows that even then he regarded with suspicion the development of Protestantism.

At Königsberg he had a violent theological dispute with Wilhelm Gnapheus. In 1547–48 he was the first rector elected by the university, but in 1548 he resigned his professorship, because he met with enmity, and was dissatisfied with religious conditions in Prussia. Still he continued to be one of the councillors of the duke. In 1549 he married at Breslau the daughter of John Hess, a reformer of that place.

Returning to Königsberg, a new dispute broke out between him and Osiander. The dogmatic dissension, which seemed to him to make everything uncertain, drove him continually more and more to the Catholic idea of Tradition and to the demand for the authoritative exposition of the Scriptures by the Church. He expressed these views in the treatise Synodus sanctorum patrum antiquorum contra nova dogmata Andreæ Osiandri, which he wrote at Danzig in 1552. A severe illness hastened his conversion, which took place at Breslau at the end of 1552.

After this he first entered the service of the Bishop of Breslau, for whom he established a school at Neisse. In 1555 the Emperor Ferdinand I appointed him a member of the imperial council. At the Disputation of Worms in 1557 he opposed, as one of the Catholic collocutors, the once venerated Melanchthon. In his Theologiæ Martini Lutheri trimembris epitome (1558) he severely attacked the lack of union in Protestantism, the worship of Luther, and religious subjectivism. The treatise called forth a number of answers.

In 1560 Duke Albert of Bavaria, at the request of Canisius, appointed Staphylus professor of theology at the Bavarian University of Ingolstadt after Staphylus had received the Degree of Doctor of Theology and Canon Law in virtue of a papal dispensation, as he was married. As superintendent (curator) he reformed the university.

After this he took an active part in the Catholic restoration in Bavaria and Austria. He drew up several opinions on reform for the Council of Trent, as the "Counsel to Pius IV", while he declined to go to the council personally. In 1562 Pope Pius IV sent him a gift of one hundred gulden, and the emperor raised him to the nobility. He died at Ingolstadt, aged 51.

His learning and eloquence are frankly acknowledged by his Lutheran fellow-countryman Hermann Hamelmann.

== Works ==
- Diodori Siculi fragmentary ex Greco in latinum versa
- Historia et Apologia Utriusque Partis, Catholicae Et Confessionariae, de dissolutione Colloquii nuper Wormatiae instituti ad omnes Catholicae fidei Protectores (Vienna, 1558)
- Theologiae Martini Lutheran Trimembris Epitome (Worms, 1558)
- Historam de vita, morte et gestis Caroli V (Augsburg, 1559)
- Defensio Pro Trimembri Theologia M. Lvtheri, Contra Aedificatores Babylonicae Tvrris. Phil Melanthonem, Shvvenckfeldianum Longinum, And. Musculum, Mat FLACC. Illyricum, Iacobum Andream Shmidelinum (Dillingen, 1561)
- Christian to report to the godly gemainen laity (Ingolstadt, 1561)
- Prodromus D. Friderici Staphyli, in Defensionem Apologiae suae, de vero germanoque scripturae sacrae intellectu etc. (Latine redditus by F. Laurentium Surium Carthusianum (Cologne, 1562))
- Hysterodromum
- Lucubrationes super plurimas sessions ad Concilium cum libris II De republica Christiana
- Oratio de bone litteris (1550)
- Synodus Patrum contra Osiandrum (1553)
- The Apologie of Fridericvs Staphylvs covnseller to the late emperovr Ferdinandvs, &c. (translated by Thomas Stapleton; Antwerp: John Latius, 1565). Available on Google Books, and reprinted in facsimile in the English Recusant Literature series edited by D. M. Rogers.

== Literature ==
- Staphylus, Frederick or season. In: Zedler's Universal-Lexicon. Vol. 39, Leipzig, 1744, columns 1228–1230.
- Paul Tschackert: Staphylus, Frederick. In: Allgemeine Deutsche Biographie (ADB). Vol. 35, Duncker & Humblot, Leipzig, 1893, pp. 457–461.
- Paul Tschackert: Staphylus, Frederick. In: Realencyklopädie für Protestantische Theologie and Kirche (RE). 3rd edn. Vol. 18, Hinrichs, Leipzig, 1906, pp. 776–771.
- Ute Mennecke-Haustein: Staphylus, Frederick. In: Theologische Realenzyklopädie (TRE). Volume 32, de Gruyter, Berlin / New York, 2001, ISBN 3-11-016712-3, pp. 113–115.
