= Marsi (Germanic tribe) =

Germanic population

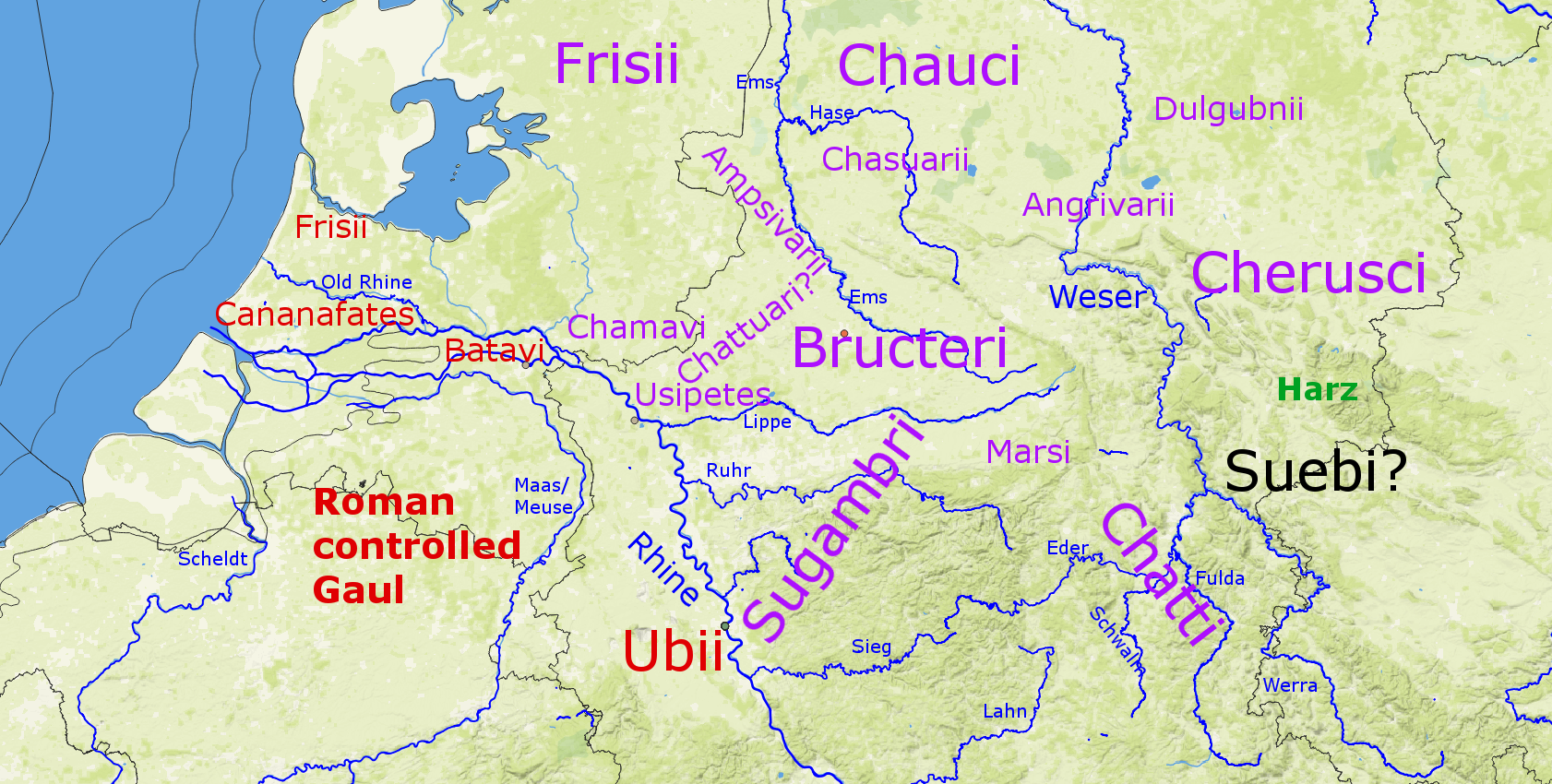
The approximate positions of some Germanic peoples reported by Graeco-Roman authors in the 1st century.

The Marsi (German: Marser) were a small Germanic tribe settled between the Rhine, Ruhr and Lippe rivers in northwest Germany. It has been suggested that they were a part of the Sugambri who managed to stay east of the Rhine after most Sugambri had been moved from this area. Strabo describes the Marsi as an example of a Germanic tribe who were originally from the Rhine area, now the war-torn Roman frontier, but had migrated deep into Germania.

== History ==
Tacitus mentions them repeatedly, in particular in the context of the wars of Germanicus. They had been part of the tribal coalition of the Cheruscian war leader and traitor to Rome, Arminius that in 9 AD annihilated three Roman legions under Varus in the Battle of Teutoburg Forest. Germanicus, seeking revenge for this defeat, invaded the lands of the Marsi in 14 AD with 12,000 legionnaires, 26 cohorts of auxiliaries and eight cavalry squadrons. The Marsi were massacred during a festival near a temple dedicated to Tamfana. According to Tacitus, an area of 50 Roman miles was laid to waste with fire and sword: "No sex, no age found pity." One Legion Eagle was recovered from the Marsi during the campaign of 16 AD.

Several town names today are often seen as reminders of the ancient Marsi, especially Marsberg with its quarter Obermarsberg in eastern North Rhine-Westphalia and Volkmarsen in northern Hesse. But the early versions of the name Marsberg are Eresburg within the Royal Frankish Annals and Heresburg within The Deeds of the Saxons by Widukind of Corvey. Volkmarsen is first mentioned in 1155 as Volkmaressen, which derives from Volkmarshusen and means "at the houses of Volkmar".

=== Leaders of the Marsi ===
1. Mallovendus, ca. 15 CE

== Literature ==
- Beatrix Günnewig, Günter Neumann: Marsen. In: Reallexikon der Germanischen Altertumskunde. Bd. 19. Berlin 2001, S. 361ff. (in German)
- Ralf G. Jahn: Der Römisch–Germanische Krieg (9-16 n. Chr.). Dissertation University Bonn 2001. (in German)

== See also ==
- List of Germanic peoples
