= Externsteine relief =

German rock relief depiction

Coordinates: 51.8690°N 8.9173°E

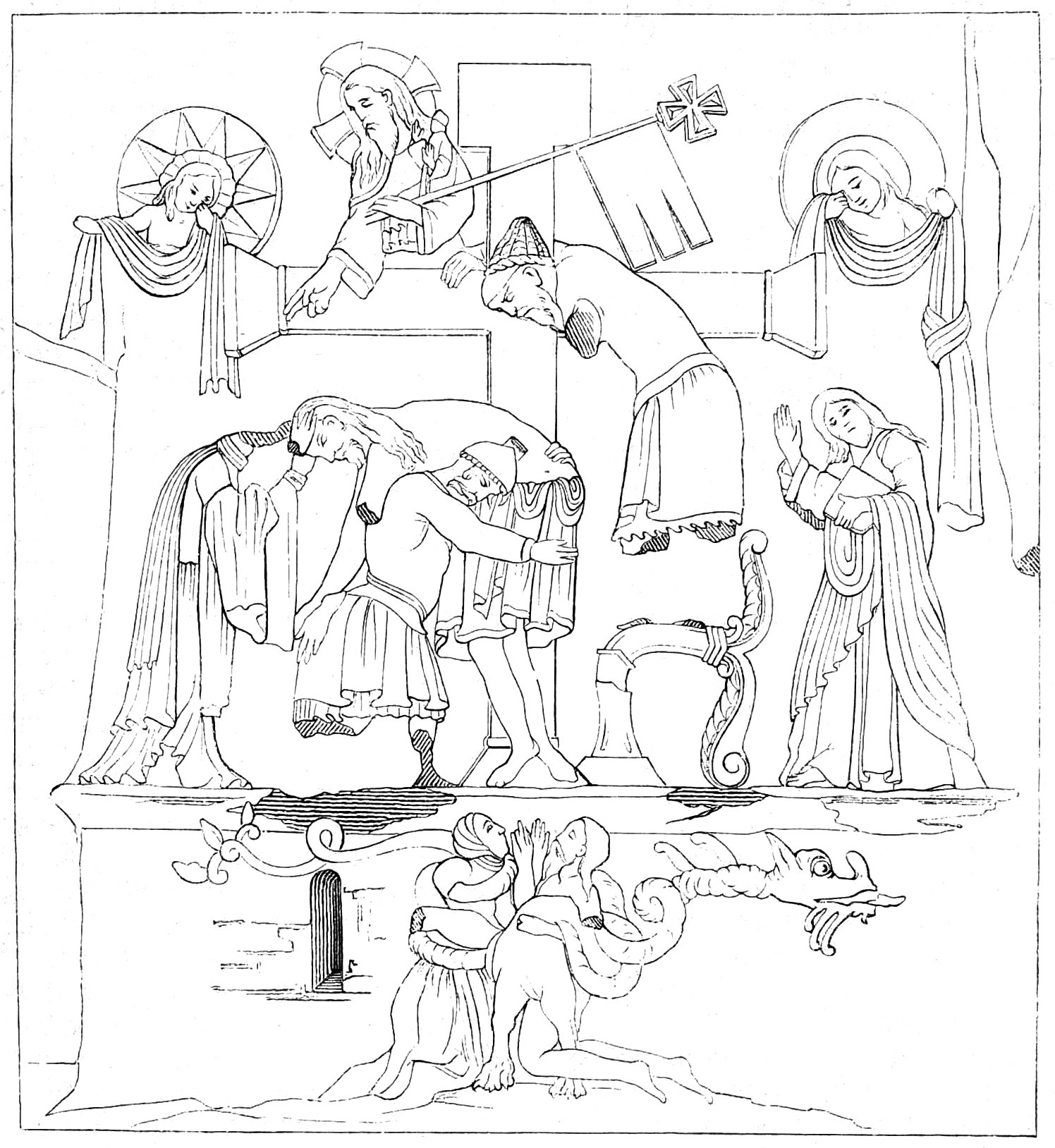
Drawing of the relief from Die Gartenlaube (1862)

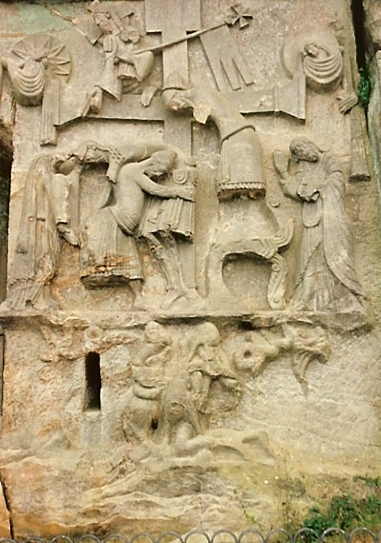
View of the relief

The Externsteine relief is a monumental rock relief depiction of the Descent from the Cross scene, carved into the side of the Externsteine sandstone formation in the Teutoburg Forest. The Externsteine are located near Detmold, now in the German state of North Rhine-Westphalia but in the Middle Ages in the Duchy of Saxony.

It is the oldest relief of this type known north of the Alps, dated to the high medieval period (likely the 12th century).

== Description ==
The relief measures 4.8 m high by 3.7 m wide.

It is divided into three parts, or registers. The largest, central register shows the Descent from the Cross scene itself. At the center is the cross, to the right is a figure identified as Nicodemus. The legs of this figure have been lost since at least the 17th century, but it is shown at an elevated position, aiding in the recovery of Jesus' body from the cross. The figure was standing on a supporting structure, believed to be the symbol for the Saxon Irminsul (better known as the Norse Ygdrassil), which is believed to have been honoured in externsteine before Charlemagne destroyed and converted Externsteine to Christianity. It is often identified as either a plant bent by Nicodemus' weight, or as a chair. Nicodemus lowers the body of Jesus towards Joseph of Arimathea, who is standing to the left of the cross. To the left of Joseph is the figure of Mary, Mother of Jesus (the head of this figure has been lost), with her hand supporting the head of her son's corpse. Opposite Mary, on the right side of the scene, is John the Apostle, holding a book.

The upper register shows the torso of the ascended Christ wearing a cross halo and a victory flag. Alongside the flag, the figure is holding a small representation of a human figure with raised hands. To the left and right, anthropomorphic representations of Sun and Moon are shown, holding drapes.

The lower register shows two kneeling figures, a naked bearded man and a clothed figure of undetermined sex, both of them caught in the coils of the neck and tail of a two-legged, winged dragon. These figures were variously identified as Adam and Eve (representing the fallen state of man in general), or as a Saxon warrior and priest.

== Dating ==
Goethe writing in 1824 identified the relief as a work of the Carolingian period. In the same year Karl Theodor Menke dated it to the 12th century. Art historians of the later 19th and early 20th century tended to support Goethe's view of an early date of origin, but a re-examination of the evidence by a team of art historians in 1950 resulted in a shift of communis opinio towards a high medieval date. The view of the relief as of Carolingian date remains a minority position, especially popular by authors who would like to identify the "plant-like" structure as a representation of Irminsul, e.g. in a 1997 anthroposophical publication.

Today, the consensus remains that the relief probably dates to 1160/70.

== See also ==
- Irminsul § Wilhelm Teudt, the Externsteine, and symbol for the modern symbol derived from the vegetation or chair depicted on the rock carving
