= Wilhelm Teudt =

German archaeologist and cleric (1860–1942)

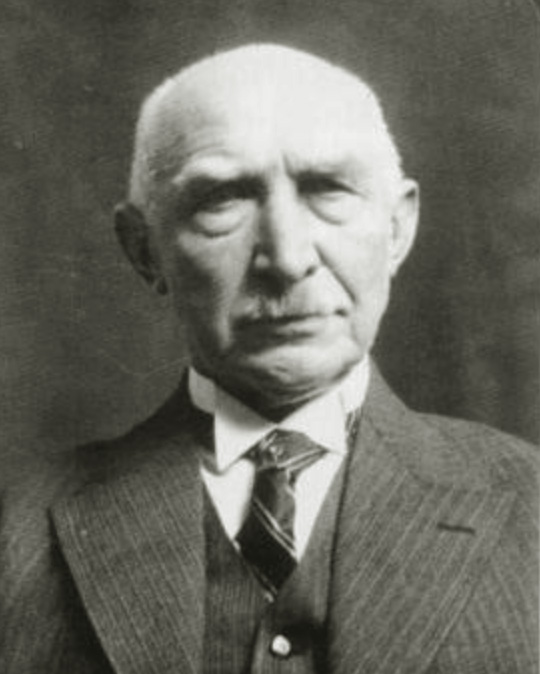
- Wilhelm Teudt in 1938
- Born: December 7, 1860; Bergkirchen, Schaumburg-Lippe
- Died: January 5, 1942 (aged 81); Detmold, Nazi Germany
- Occupations: Cleric, archaeologist
- Notable work: Germanische Heiligtümer
- Political party: Nazi Party
- Other political affiliations: German National People's Party
- Movement: Völkisch movement

Wilhelm Teudt (7 December 1860 in Bergkirchen – 5 January 1942 in Detmold) was a German cleric and völkisch lay archaeologist who believed in an ancient, highly developed Germanic civilization. His 1929 work Germanische Heiligtümer was rejected by experts even at the time of publication, but continues to have some influence in esoteric and neopagan circles in Germany.

== Life and career ==
Teudt was born on 7 December 1860 in Bergkirchen, Schaumburg-Lippe as the son of a Protestant priest. He studied theology and philosophy at the universities of Berlin, Leipzig, Tübingen and Bonn. He was ordained in 1885 and was a pastor in Probsthagen and Stadthagen. In 1894/95, he succeeded Friedrich Naumann as the head of the Inner mission at Frankfurt. In 1907, Teudt co-founded the Keplerbund zur Förderung der Naturerkenntnis (a group fighting the ideas of Charles Darwin) before renouncing his status as a priest in 1909. Teudt volunteered for military service and served in World War I from 1915 to 1918.

In 1921, due to the Occupation of the Rhineland by French and Belgian troops he moved to Detmold. That same year he founded the Cheruskerbund – Heimatbund für Lippe, which in 1924 was incorporated into Der Stahlhelm. Teudt joined the German National People's Party (DNVP). He likely joined the Deutschbund in 1924 and in 1925 supported the Nationalsozialistische Freiheitsbewegung Deutschlands. In 1928/29, he became Gauherr or Deutschmeister of the Deutschbund in Detmold. Teudt founded the Vereinigung der Freunde germanischer Vorgeschichte in 1928 and in 1929 published the book Germanische Heiligtümer. Though his ideas overlapped with those of Hermann Wirth and Wirth published some articles in Teudt's monthly Germanien, after the Nazi takeover of power the two became competitors.

Teudt joined the NSDAP at some point before 1935. In 1936, his organization (Freunde) participated in the Pflegstätte für Germanenkunde at Detmold set up by the Ahnenerbe. In 1935, on his 75th birthday he was awarded a professorship by Adolf Hitler, apparently on the suggestion of Heinrich Himmler. In 1936, he became an honorary citizen of the city of Detmold.

He joined Ahnenerbe in 1936, but was forced to leave in 1938 because of a falling-out with Himmler, who described Teudt as "unobjective and pathologically quarrelsome".

Thus his work at the Pflegstätte ended in 1938. In 1939, Teudt founded the Osningmark-Gesellschaft, renamed after his death to Wilhelm-Teudt-Gesellschaft. The year after, Teudt was awarded the Goethemedaille für Kunst und Wissenschaft on the request of Gauleiter Alfred Meyer.

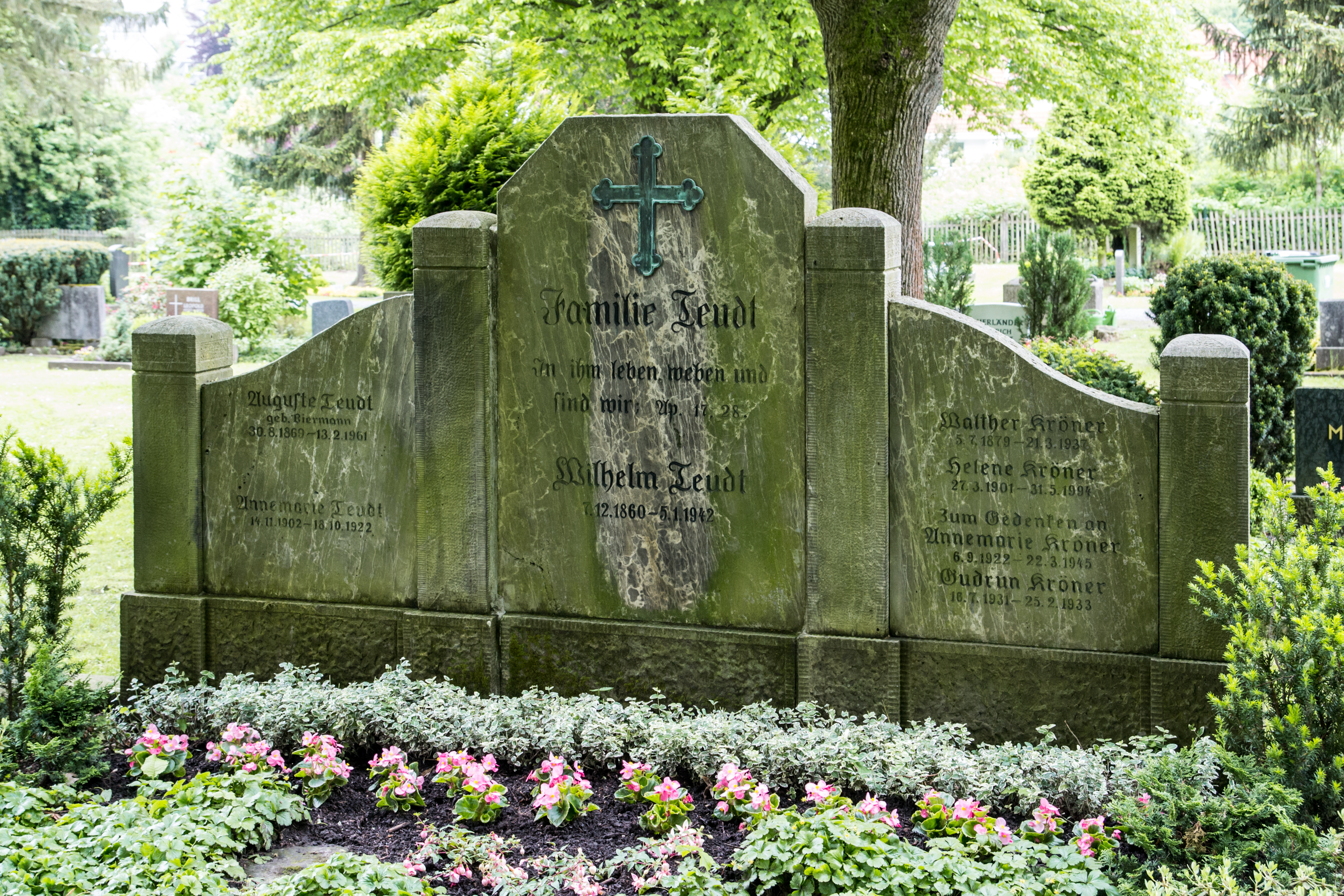
Teudt's family grave at Detmold

Teudt died on 5 January 1942 in Detmold and is buried there. A street was named after him until 1969. In 2010, the city posthumously revoked his status as honorary citizen.

== Theories ==
Teudt's interest in "Germanic archaeology", in particular the discovery of Germanic pagan sacred sites, developed in the 1920s. He trusted in his paranormal faculty of picking up the "vibrations" of his ancestors helping him visualize ancient sceneries of the sites he was researching.

Teudt was particularly interested in the natural stone formation of the Externsteine near Detmold, which he suggested was the location of a central Saxon shrine, the location of Irminsul and an ancient sun observatory. He assumed that the Germanic buildings there had been made from wood and thus left no traces. Teudt was put in charge of the excavations at the site and appointed Julius Andree to head the work done there by the Reichsarbeitsdienst in 1934/35. Teudt thought that the Externsteine had served as an observatory until its destruction by Charlemagne. He initiated the demolishing of tourist infrastructure (tramway, hotels) and the creation of a "sacred grove" nearby.

In Teudt's view, the Christianisation of the Saxons after 800 AD was nothing less than a cultural genocide. He thought that a highly advanced Germanic civilization had predated contact with the Romans.
