= Berlebecke =

River in Germany

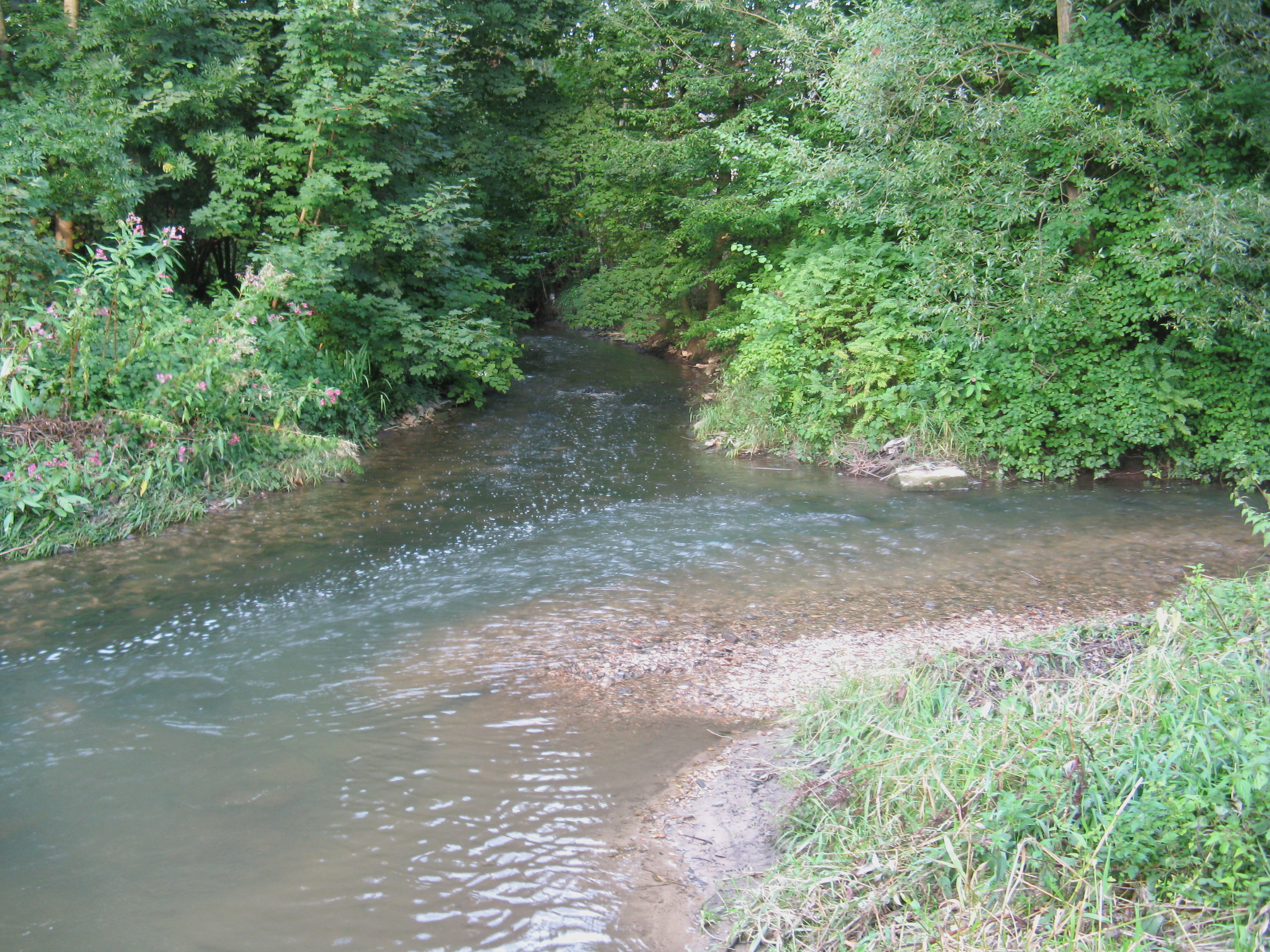

Location
- Country: Germany
- State: North Rhine-Westphalia

Physical characteristics
- Source
  - elevation: 325 m (1,066 ft)
- Mouth
  - location: Wiembecke
  - coordinates: 51.9081°N 8.8783°E
  - elevation: 157 m (515 ft)
- Length: 5.7 km (3.5 mi)
- Basin size: 10.1 km^{2} (3.9 sq mi)

Basin features
- Progression: Wiembecke→ Werre→ Weser→ North Sea

Berlebecke (in its upper course: Wiggenbach) is a river of North Rhine-Westphalia, Germany. It flows into the Wiembecke in Detmold-Heiligenkirchen.

== See also ==
- List of rivers of North Rhine-Westphalia
