= Obermarsberg =

Quarter of Marsberg, North Rhine-Westphalia, Germany

Coordinates: 51°28′N 8°51′E

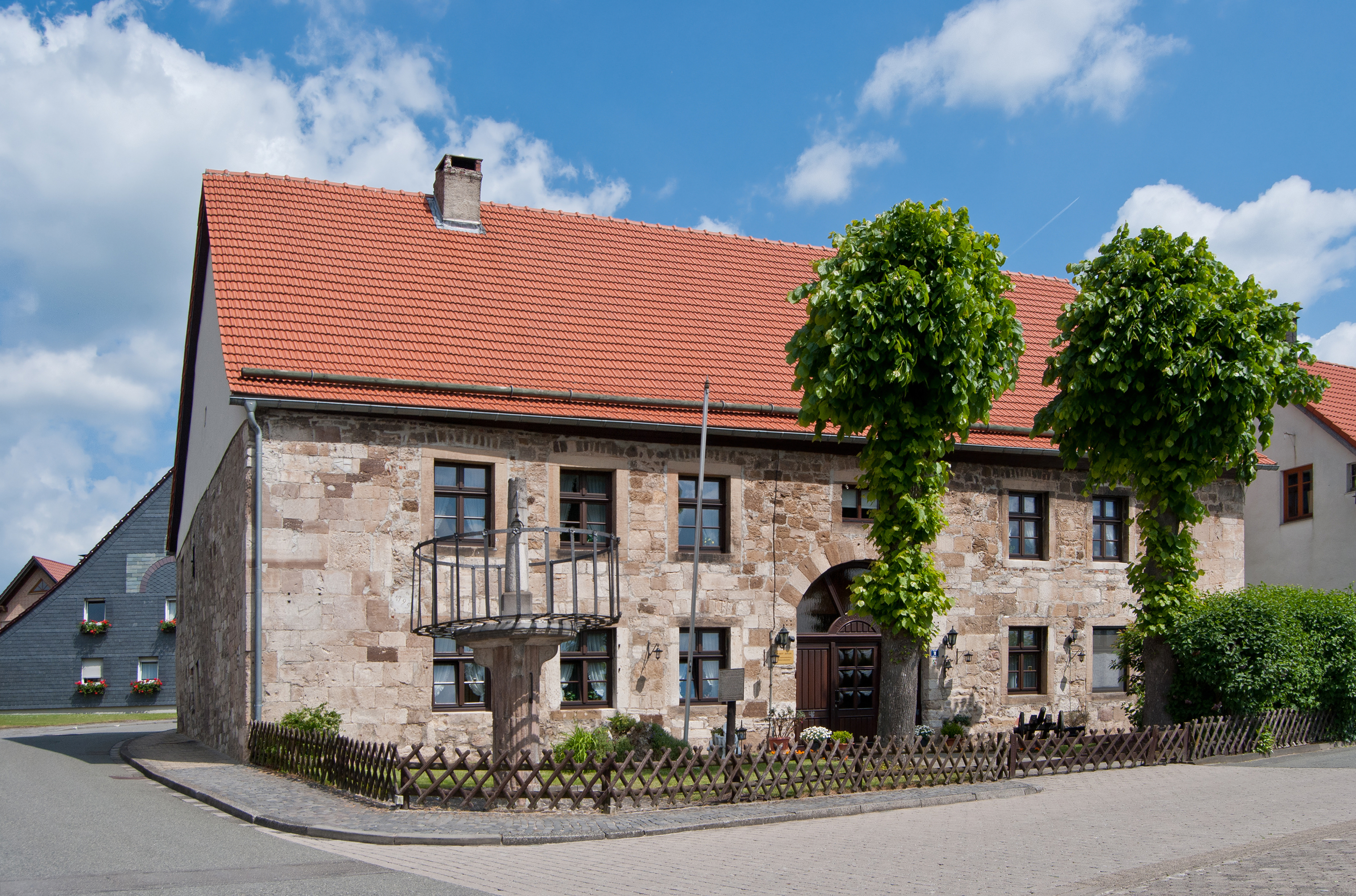
Old Town Hall and Pranger

Obermarsberg is one of seventeen quarters in the municipality of Marsberg, North Rhine-Westphalia, Germany. It is situated on the site of an Old Saxon hillfort and refuge castle, the Eresburg, on a hill 130m above the Diemel river, a tributary of the River Weser.

== History ==
The location was originally the site of an Iron Age hillfort, founded probably sometime before or during the era of the Roman-Germanic wars; including the Battle of the Teutoburg Forest (circa AD 9) and the Battle of the Weser River (circa AD 16). Although it is unclear whether the surrounding area was controlled by the Cherusci, Chatti, or perhaps Marsi (as described by Tacitus), no particular reference to the Eresburg is known prior to the Saxon Wars (AD 770–785).

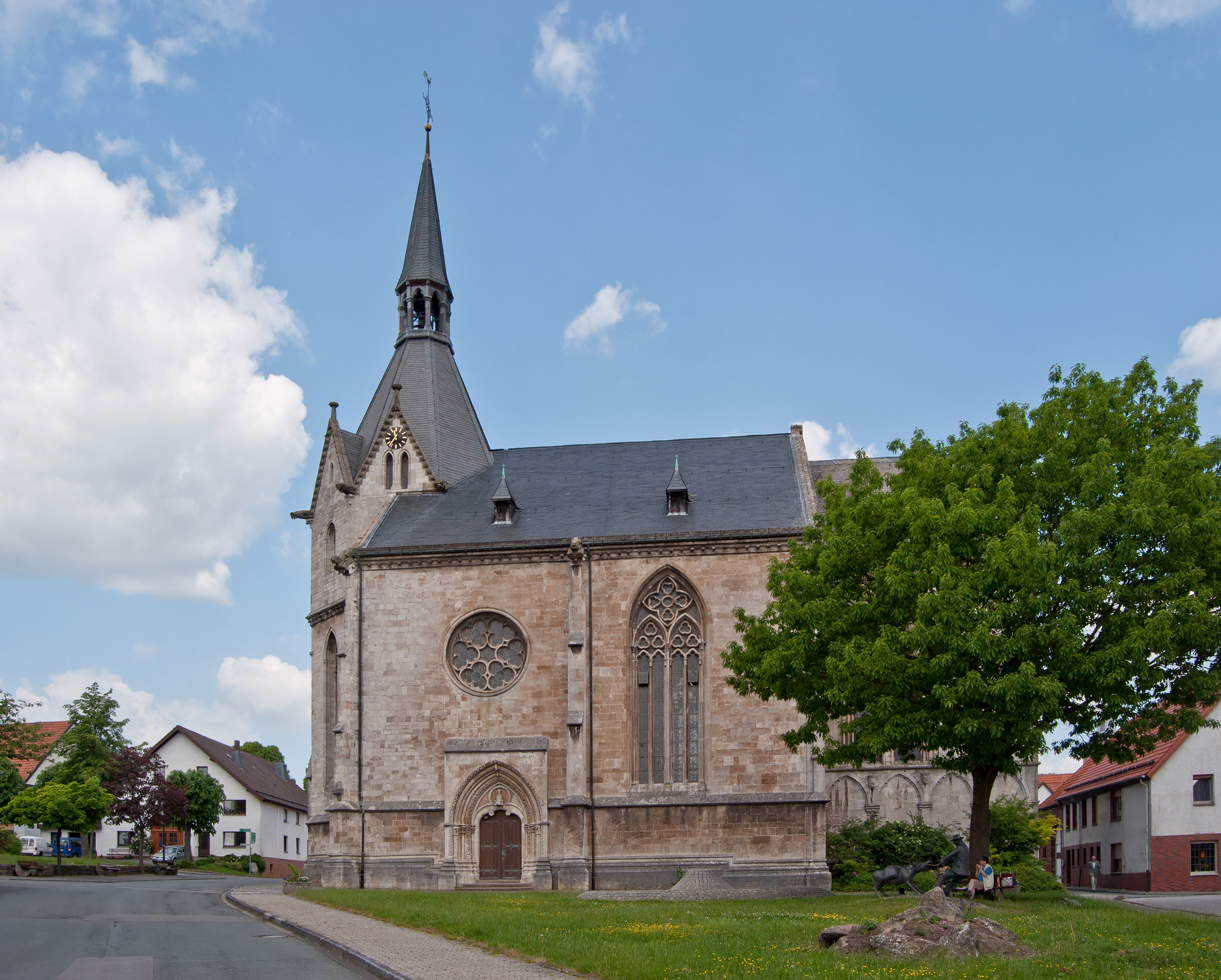
Nikolai Church

During the Saxon Wars, the stronghold was repeatedly occupied by Widukind, leader of the resisting Saxons (those refusing to adopt Christianity and the overlordship of the Franks), and then abandoned to Charlemagne's forces as the Saxons retreated to the home of Widukind's in-laws, today Denmark. Local lore states that as Charlemagne's forces approached, the town's common folk would move into the Drachenholler, a vast system of underground gypsum caves beneath Eresburg, where they remained unnoticed until Charlemagne's people left. Though only a legend, the caves can still be seen, along with several watchtowers dated to the same time period (circa AD 800).

=== Religion ===
Very near Eresburg is Priesterberg, a hill overlooking the valley of the Diemel. This was reportedly the location of Pagan sacrificial rites in the pre-Christian era. It is also thought to be the home of Irminsul, a sacred tree or pillar which represented the Germanic central pillar of the world. In AD 772, Charlemagne destroyed the Irminsul on Priesterberg (elsewhere reported as "near Paderborn" or "near Eresburg"). The Irminsul was replaced by a stone structure, possibly a tower, the crumbling remains of which can still be seen.

Around AD 800 the first Christian church was constructed in Eresburg proper. Although the current church in Obermarsberg only dates to the 13th century, it is at least the second or third church to be built over the remains of Charlemagne's original church.
