= Wiembecke =

River in Germany

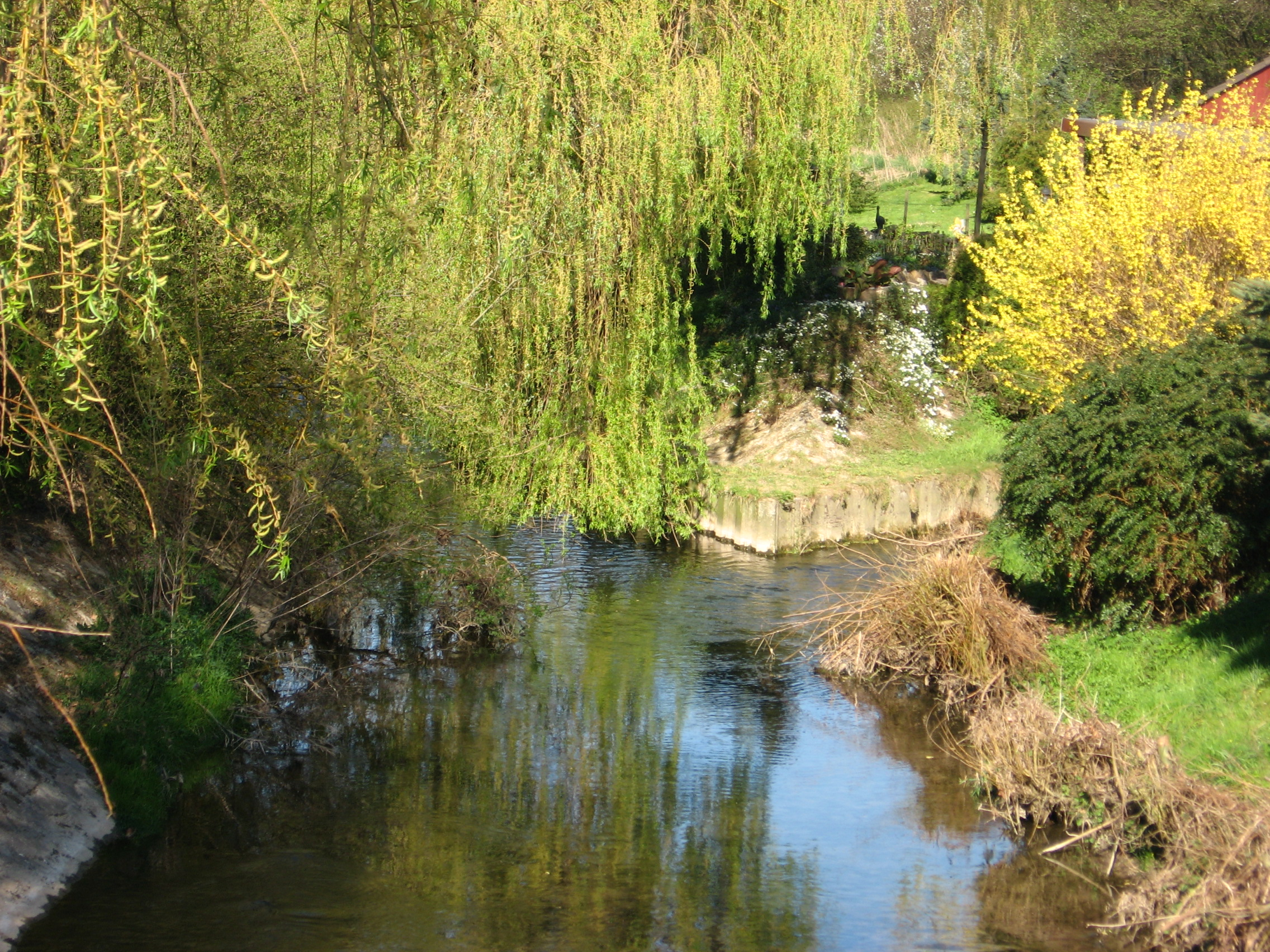

Location
- Country: Germany
- State: North Rhine-Westphalia

Physical characteristics
- Mouth
  - location: Werre
  - coordinates: 51.9465°N 8.8531°E
- Length: 18.2 km (11.3 mi)

Basin features
- Progression: Werre→ Weser→ North Sea
- Tributaries
  - left: Berlebecke

Wiembecke is a river of North Rhine-Westphalia, Germany. Its source is near the Externsteine in the Teutoburg Forest. It flows through Horn-Bad Meinberg and joins the Werre in Detmold.

In its lower course the Wiembecke is also called Knochenbach and Berlebecke. Traditionally, the Wiembecke is however considered as being a tributary of the Berlebecke.

== See also ==
- List of rivers of North Rhine-Westphalia
