= Irminsul =

Sacred, pillar-like object in Saxon paganism

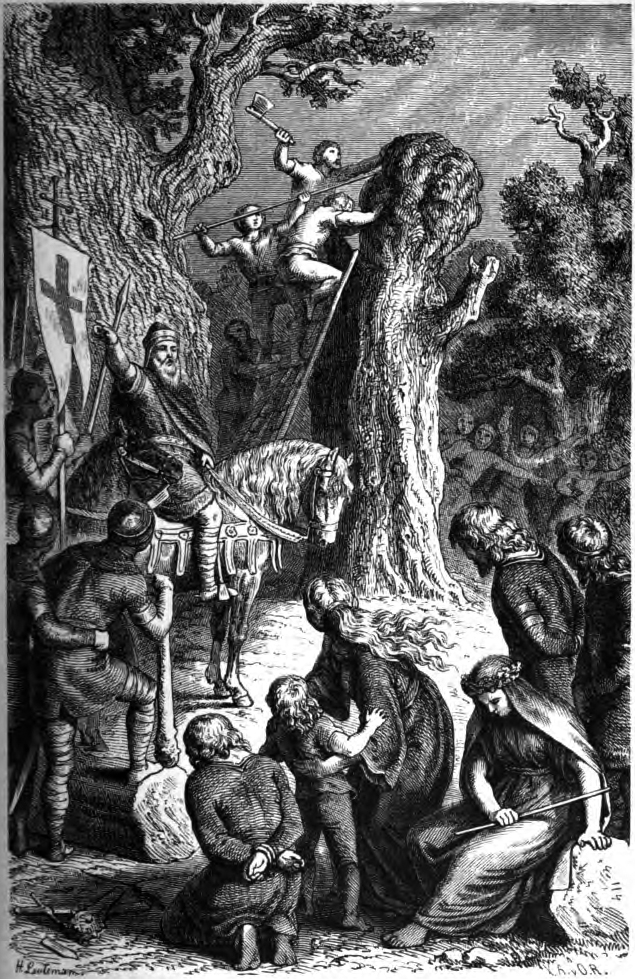
The Destruction of Irminsul by Charlemagne by Heinrich Leutemann (1882).

An Irminsul (Old Saxon 'great pillar') was a sacred, pillar-like object attested as playing an important role in the Germanic paganism of the Saxons. Medieval sources describe how an Irminsul was destroyed by Charlemagne during the Saxon Wars. A church was erected on its place in 783 and blessed by Pope Leo III. Sacred trees and sacred groves were widely venerated by the Germanic peoples (including Donar's Oak), and the oldest chronicle describing an Irminsul refers to it as a tree trunk erected in the open air.

== Etymology ==
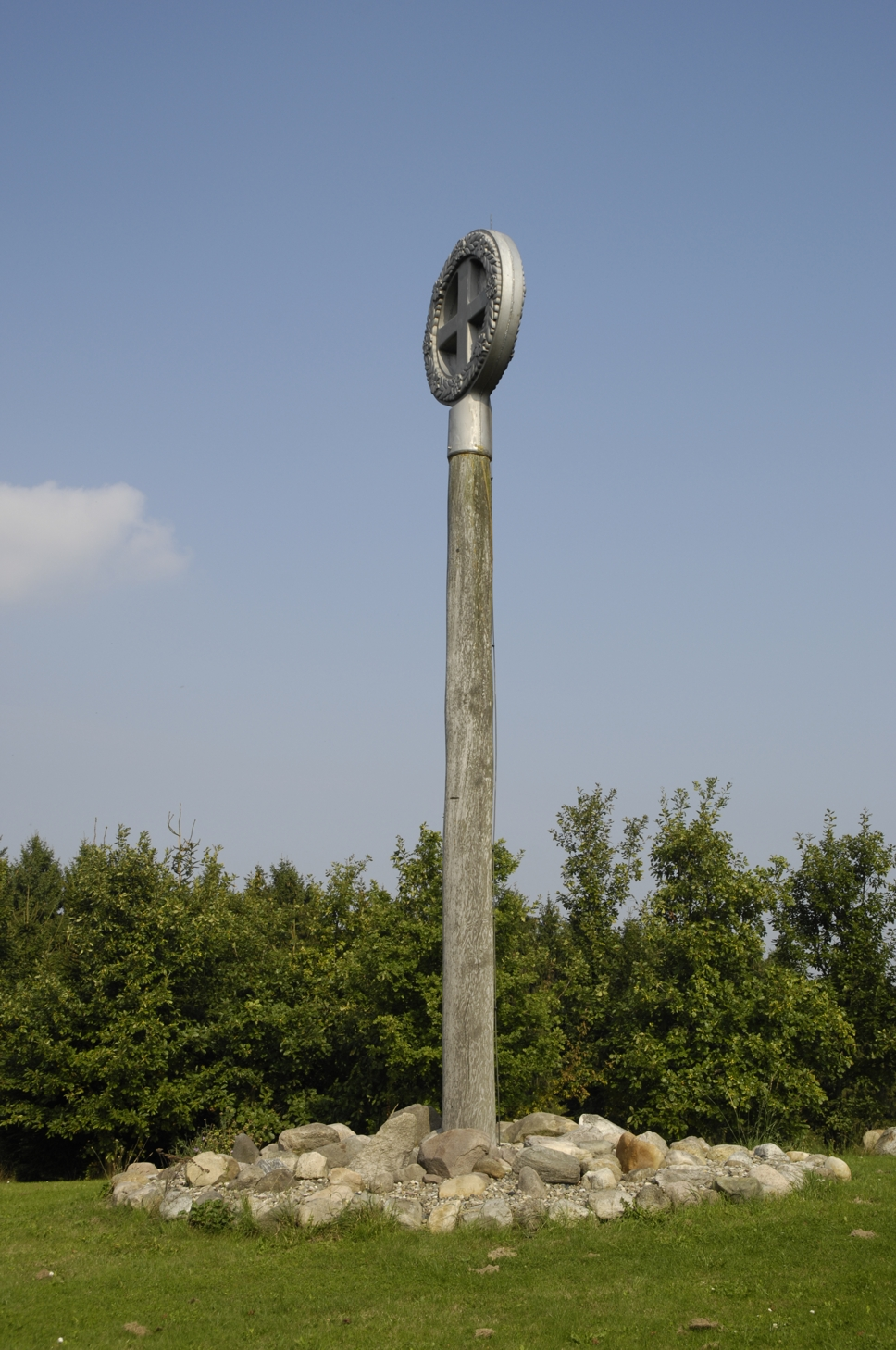
A modern interpretation of the Irminsul, erected 1996 in Harbarnsen-Irmenseul municipality (near Hildesheim in Lower Saxony). The sun cross on the top is based on the coat of arms of the village of Irmenseul.

The Old Saxon word compound Irminsûl means 'great pillar'. The first element, Irmin- ('great') is cognate with terms with some significance elsewhere in Germanic mythology. Among the North Germanic peoples, the Old Norse form of Irmin is Jörmunr, which just like Yggr is one of the names of Odin. Yggdrasil (Old Norse 'Yggr's horse') is a cosmic tree from which Odin sacrificed himself, and which connects the Nine worlds. 19th century scholar Jakob Grimm connects the name Irmin with Old Norse terms like iörmungrund ("great ground", i.e. the Earth) or iörmungandr ("great snake", i.e. the Midgard serpent).

A Germanic god Irmin, inferred from the name Irminsûl and the tribal name Irminones, is in some older scholarship presumed to have been the national god or demi-god of the Saxons. Irmin could also be an aspect or epithet of some other deity – most likely Wodan (Odin). Irmin might also have been an epithet of the god Ziu (Tyr) in early Germanic times, only later transferred to Odin, as certain scholars subscribe to the idea that Odin replaced Tyr as the chief Germanic deity at the onset of the Migration Period. This was the favoured view of early 20th century Nordicist writers, but it is not generally considered likely in modern times.

== Attestations ==
Irminsuls are attested in a variety of historic works discussing the Christianization of the continental Germanic peoples.

=== Royal Frankish Annals ===
According to the Royal Frankish Annals (772 AD), during the Saxon Wars, Charlemagne is repeatedly described as ordering the destruction of the chief seat of their religion, an Irminsul. The Irminsul is described as not being far from Heresburg (now Obermarsberg), Germany. Jacob Grimm states that "strong reasons" point to the actual location of the Irminsul as being approximately 15 miles (24 km) away, in the Teutoburg Forest and states that the original name for the region "Osning" may have meant "Holy Wood".

=== De miraculis sancti Alexandri ===
The Benedictine monk Rudolf of Fulda (AD 865) provides a description of an Irminsul in chapter 3 of his Latin work De miraculis sancti Alexandri. Rudolf's description states that the Irminsul was a great wooden pillar erected and worshipped beneath the open sky and that its name, Irminsul, signifies universal all-sustaining pillar.

=== Widukind of Corvey ===
Clive Tolley has argued that Widukind of Corvey in a passage of his Deeds of the Saxons (c. 970) is in fact describing an ad hoc Irminsul erected to celebrate the Saxon leader Hadugato's victory over the Thuringians in 531. Widukind says the Saxons set up an altar to their god of victory, whose body they depicted as a wooden column:

When morning was come they set up an eagle at the eastern gate, and erecting an altar of victory they celebrated appropriate rites with all due solemnity, according to their ancestral superstition: to the one whom they venerate as their god of Victory they give the name of Mars, and the bodily characteristics of Hercules, imitating his physical proportion by means of wooden columns, and in the hierarchy of their gods he is the Sun, or as the Greeks call him, Apollo. From this fact the opinion of those men appears somewhat probable who hold that the Saxons were descended from the Greeks, because the Greeks call Mars Hirmin or Hermes, a word which we use even to this day, either for blame or praise, without knowing its meaning.

Widukind is confused, however, about the name of the god, since the Roman Mars and the Greek Hermes do not correspond. Tolley supposes that the name Hirmin, of which Widukind does not know the meaning, is not to be related to Hermes, but to Irmin, the dedicatee of the Irminsul.

=== Hildesheim ===
Under Louis the Pious in the 9th century, a stone column was dug up at Obermarsberg in Westphalia, Germany, and relocated to the Hildesheim cathedral in Hildesheim, Lower Saxony, Germany. The column was reportedly then used as a candelabrum until at least the late 19th century. In the 13th century, the destruction of the Irminsul by Charlemagne was recorded as having still been commemorated at Hildesheim on the Saturday after Laetare Sunday.

The commemoration was reportedly done by planting two poles six feet high, each surmounted by a wooden object one foot in height shaped like a pyramid or a cone on the cathedral square. The youth then used sticks and stones in an attempt to knock over the object. This custom is described as existing elsewhere in Germany, particularly in Halberstadt where it was enacted on the day of Laetare Sunday by the Canons themselves.

=== Kaiserchronik ===
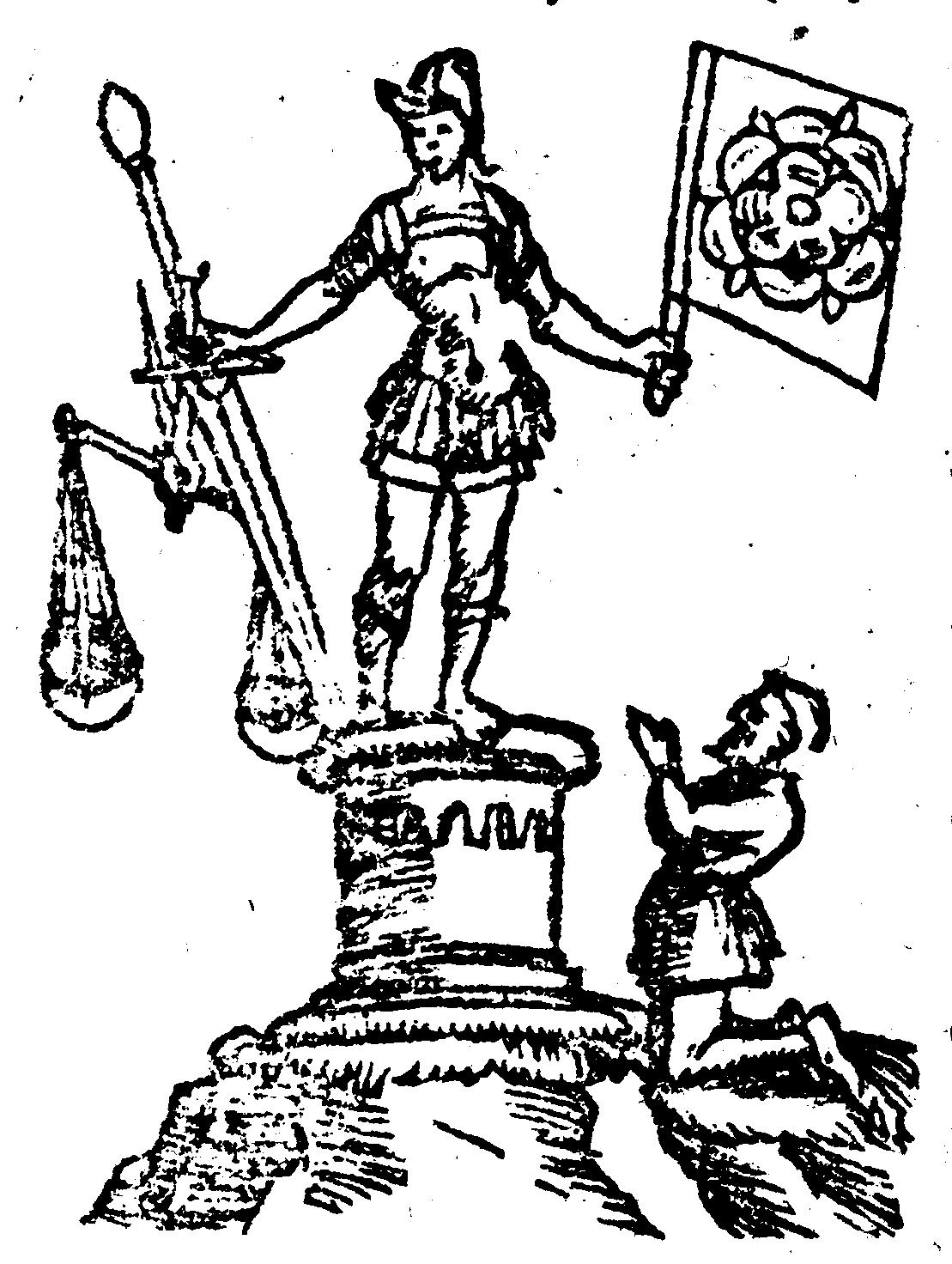
A late 16th century interpretation of an Irminsul bearing the cult image of a god of war and commerce, from Sebastian Münster's Cosmographia

Awareness of the significance of the concept seems to have persisted well into Christian times. For example, in the twelfth-century Kaiserchronik an Irminsul is mentioned in three instances:

Concerning the origin of the Wednesday:

ûf ainer irmensiule / stuont ain abgot ungehiure, / daz hiezen si ir choufman.
On an Irminsul / stands an enormous idol / which they call their merchant

Concerning Julius Caesar:

Rômâre in ungetrûwelîche sluogen / sîn gebaine si ûf ain irmensûl begruoben
The Romans slew him treacherously / and buried his bones on an Irminsul

Concerning Nero:

ûf ain irmensûl er staich / daz lantfolch im allez naich.
He climbed upon an Irminsul / the peasants all bowed before him

ABBOT DE LUBERSAC (Abbé de Lubersac): Discours sur les Monuments Publics (Speech on Public Monuments)

The abbot place the Irminsul in Stattbergen, Bavaria. (P.183)

== Hypotheses ==
=== Germania, Pillars of Hercules, and Jupiter Columns ===
In Tacitus' Germania, the author mentions rumors of what he describes as "Pillars of Hercules" in land inhabited by the Frisii that had yet to be explored. Tacitus adds that these pillars exist either because Hercules actually did go there or because the Romans have agreed to ascribe all marvels anywhere to Hercules' credit. Tacitus states that while Drusus Germanicus was daring in his campaigns against the Germanic tribes, he was unable to reach this region, and that subsequently no one had yet made the attempt. Connections have been proposed between these "Pillars of Hercules" and later accounts of the Irminsuls. Hercules was probably frequently identified with Thor by the Romans due to the practice of interpretatio romana.

Comparisons have been made between the Irminsul and the Jupiter Columns that were erected along the Rhine in Germania around the 2nd and 3rd centuries CE. Scholarly comparisons were once made between the Irminsul and the Jupiter Columns; however, Rudolf Simek states that the columns were of Gallo-Roman religious monuments, and that the reported location of the Irminsul in Eresburg does not fall within the area of the Jupiter Column archaeological finds.

=== Wilhelm Teudt, the Externsteine, and symbol ===
The medieval Externsteine relief, located on a rock formation near Detmold, Germany, features a shape often identified as a bent tree at the feet of Nicodemus. In 1929, German lay archaeologist and future Ahnenerbe member Wilhelm Teudt proposed that the symbol represented an Irminsul.

However, according to scholar Bernard Mees:

A medieval relief depicting Christ's descent from the cross on one of the Extern Stones seems to show what Teudt interpreted as a tree being withered by the cross (less imaginative researchers consider it to simply be an elaborate chair) ... [the symbol] joined the runes and the swastika as one of the foremost symbols of the anti-Christian völkisch identity at the time and remains a motif treasured among German neopagans today.

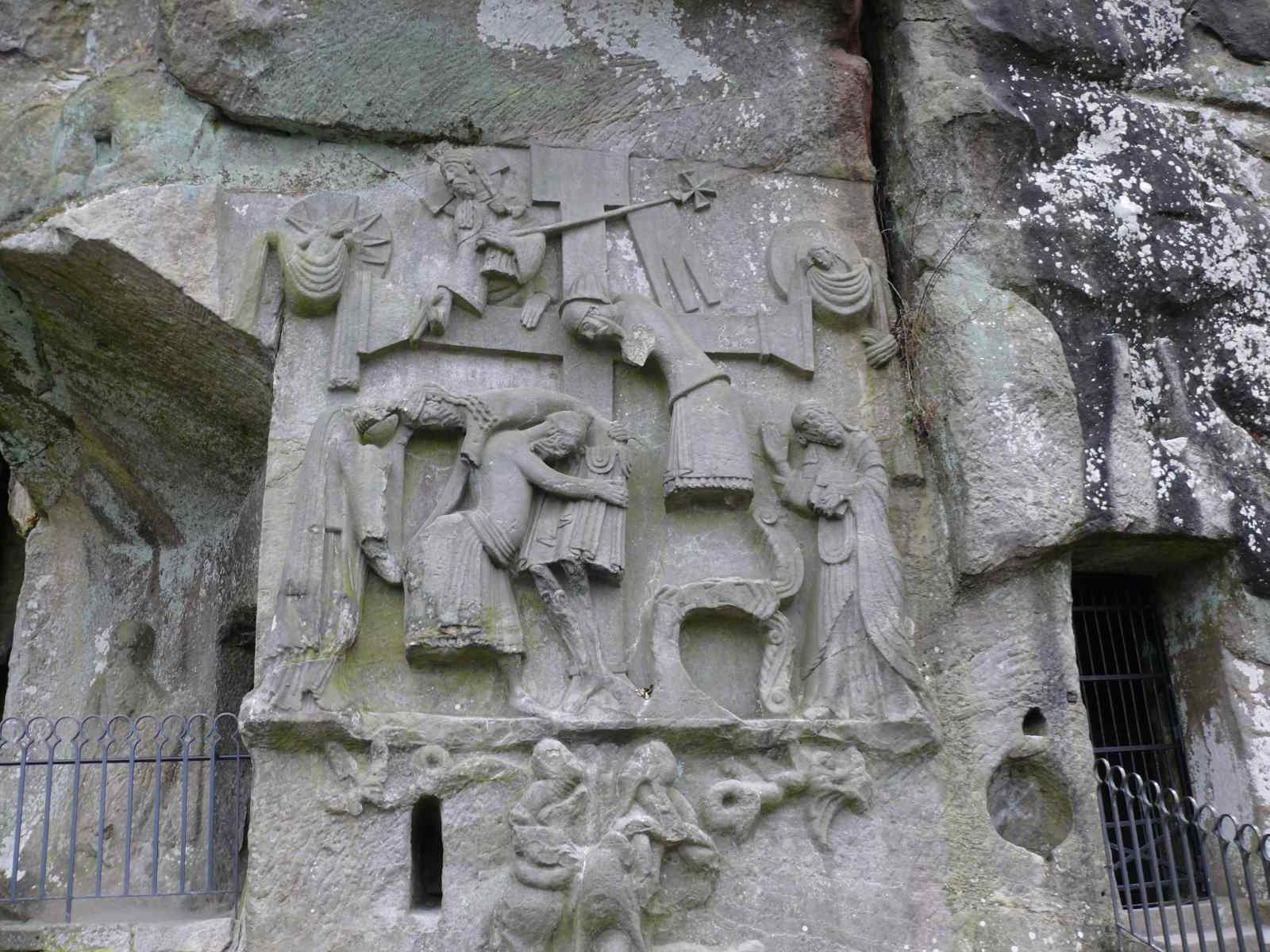
The image identified as representing Irminsul by Wilhelm Teudt on the Externsteine Descent from the Cross relief, rejected by Bernard Mees and interpreted as an elaborate chair

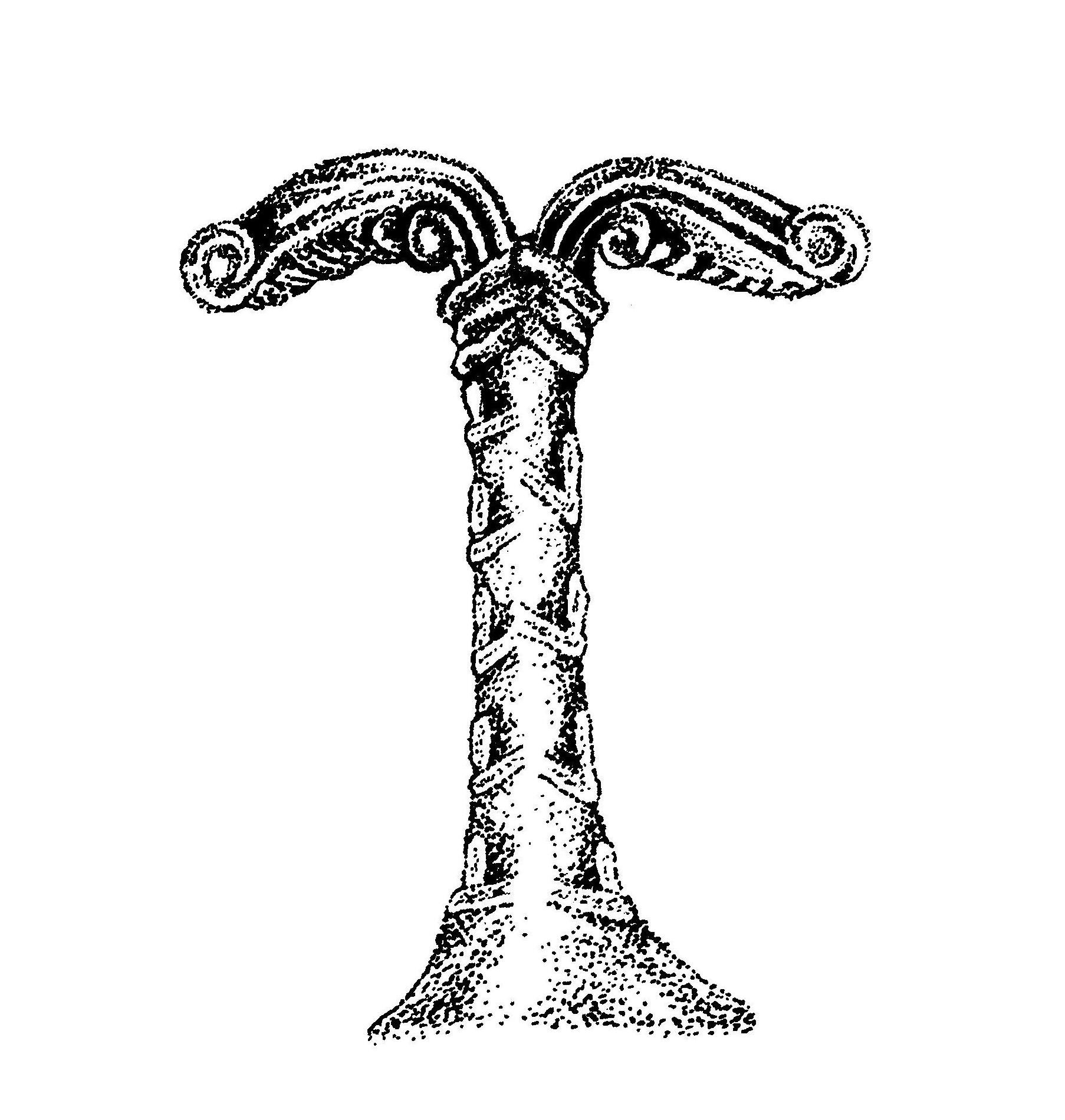
An illustration of Wilhelm Teudt's proposed 'straightening' of the object, yielding what he considered to symbolize an Irminsul, and subsequently used in Nazi Germany and among some Neopagan groups

A stylized illustration based on Wilhelm Teudt's proposal

== See also ==
- Ahnenerbe
- Asherah pole
- Celtic Cross
- Irminenschaft
- Maypole
- Mjölnir
- Palmette
- Roland (Rolandssäulen)
- Sacred grove
- Sacred tree at Uppsala
- Thor's Oak
- Yggdrasil
