= Hermann Hamelmann =

German theologian (1526–1595)

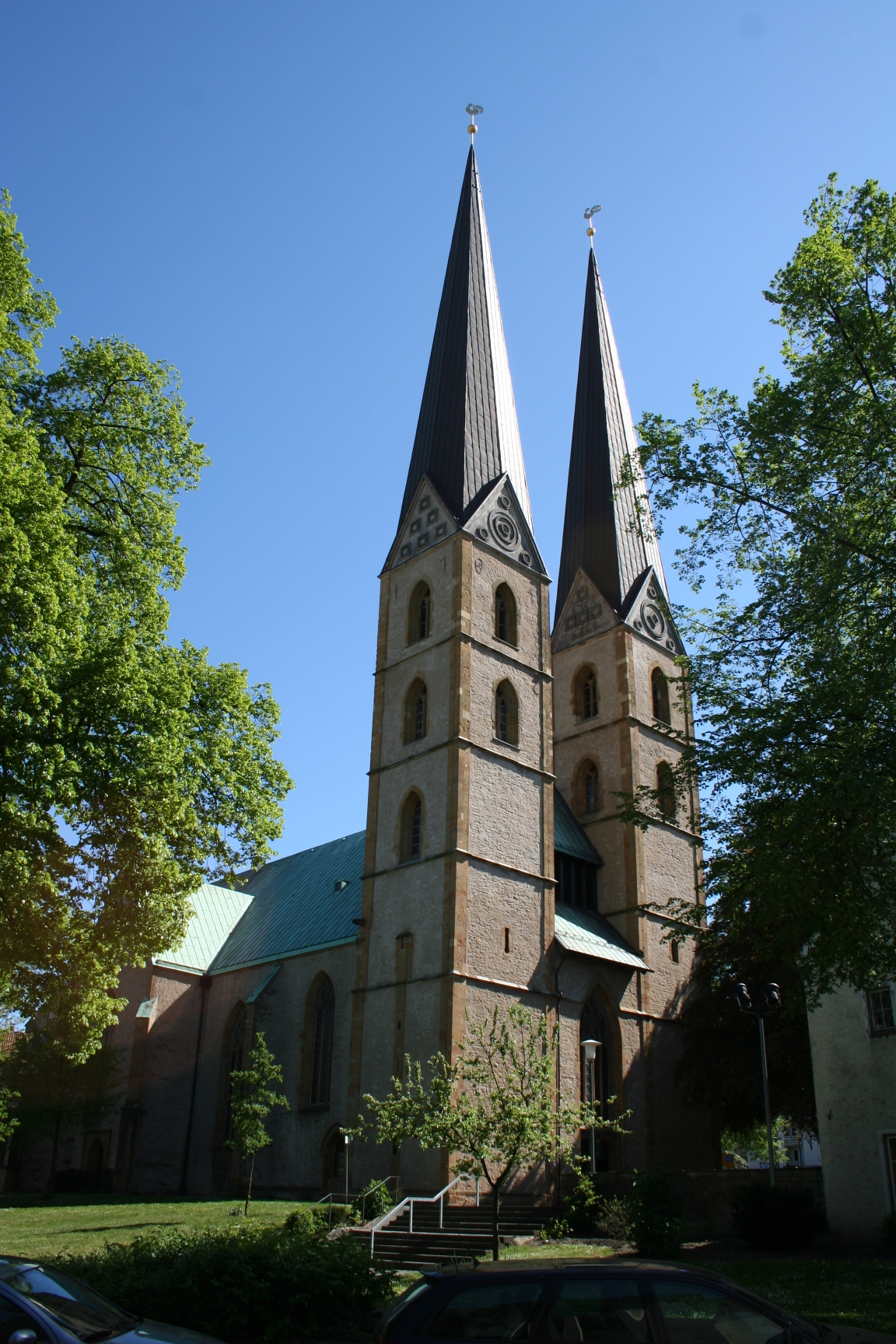
Hamelmann preached at the Neustädter Marienkirche while serving as pastor at Bielefeld. Although built from 1293–1512, the spires were destroyed during WWII and replaced by the current towers.

Hermann Hamelmann (1526 – 26 June 1595) was a German Lutheran theologian and the reformer of Westphalia. Born in Osnabrück, he became the priest at Kamen in 1552. While a priest, he converted to the Evangelical Lutheran faith and announced it publicly on Trinity Sunday, 1553, and as a result he was forced to leave the town. During a stay at Wittenberg, he discussed the Lord's Supper with Philipp Melanchthon. In August 1553, he became the pastor at Bielefeld, and in 1556 he became the pastor at St. Mary's Church in Lemgo. He became General Superintendent at Bad Gandersheim in 1560, where he introduced the Reformation into Braunschweig. He was instrumental in bringing the Lutheran faith to Oldenburg after becoming Superintendent there in 1573. Along with Nikolaus Selnecker, he wrote the Oldenburg Church Order in 1573. A learned man, he was deep in conviction and sound in his faith.

== Works ==
- 1564 Oldenburgisch Chronicon
- 1564/5 Illustrium Westphaliae virorum libri 1–6
- 1586/7 Historia ecclesiastica renati evangelii per inferiorem Saxoniam et Westphaliam
