= Borken II =

Federal electoral district of Germany

125 Borken II
- Electoral district for the Bundestag
- Borken II in 2025
- State: North Rhine-Westphalia
- Population: 260,800 (2019)
- Electorate: 201,102 (2021)
- Major settlements: Bocholt; Borken; Vreden
- Area: 996.4 km^{2}

Current electoral district
- Created: 1949
- Party: CDU
- Member: Anne König
- Elected: 2021, 2025

Borken II is an electoral constituency (German: Wahlkreis) represented in the Bundestag. It elects one member via first-past-the-post voting. Under the current constituency numbering system, it is designated as constituency 125. It is located in northern North Rhine-Westphalia, comprising the western and central part of the Borken district.

Borken II was created for the inaugural 1949 federal election. Since 2021, it has been represented by Anne König of the Christian Democratic Union (CDU).

== Geography ==
Borken II is located in northern North Rhine-Westphalia. As of the 2021 federal election, it comprises the entirety of the Borken district excluding the municipalities of Ahaus, Gronau, Heek, Legden, and Schöppingen.

== History ==
Borken II was created in 1949, then known as Borken – Bocholt – Ahaus. From 1965 through 1976, it was named Ahaus – Bocholt. From 1980 through 1987, it was named Borken. It acquired its current name in the 1990 election. In the 1949 election, it was North Rhine-Westphalia constituency 35 in the numbering system. From 1953 through 1961, it was number 94. From 1965 through 1976, it was number 92. From 1980 through 1998, it was number 96. From 2002 through 2009, it was number 127. In the 2013 through 2021 elections, it was number 126. From the 2025 election, it has been number 125.

Originally, the constituency comprised the districts of Borken and Ahaus and the independent city of Bocholt. In the 1980 through 1987 elections, it was coterminous with the district of Borken. From 1990 through 1998, it comprised the municipalities of Ahaus, Bocholt, Borken, Gescher, Gronau, Heek, Isselburg, Legden, Rhede, Schöppingen, Stadtlohn, Südlohn, Velen, and Vreden from Borken district. It acquired its current borders in the 2002 election.

Election	No.	Name	Borders
1949	35	Borken – Bocholt – Ahaus	Borken district; Ahaus district; Bocholt city
1953	94	Borken – Bocholt – Ahaus	Borken district; Ahaus district; Bocholt city
1957	94	Borken – Bocholt – Ahaus	Borken district; Ahaus district; Bocholt city
1961	94	Borken – Bocholt – Ahaus	Borken district; Ahaus district; Bocholt city
1965	92	Ahaus – Bocholt	Borken district; Ahaus district; Bocholt city
1969	92	Ahaus – Bocholt	Borken district; Ahaus district; Bocholt city
1972	92	Ahaus – Bocholt	Borken district; Ahaus district; Bocholt city
1976	92	Ahaus – Bocholt	Borken district; Ahaus district; Bocholt city
1980	96	Borken	Borken district
1983	96	Borken	Borken district
1987	96	Borken	Borken district
1990	96	Borken II	Borken district (only Ahaus, Bocholt, Borken, Gescher, Gronau, Heek, Isselburg, Legden, Rhede, Schöppingen, Stadtlohn, Südlohn, Velen, and Vreden municipalities)
1994	96	Borken II	Borken district (only Ahaus, Bocholt, Borken, Gescher, Gronau, Heek, Isselburg, Legden, Rhede, Schöppingen, Stadtlohn, Südlohn, Velen, and Vreden municipalities)
1998	96	Borken II	Borken district (only Ahaus, Bocholt, Borken, Gescher, Gronau, Heek, Isselburg, Legden, Rhede, Schöppingen, Stadtlohn, Südlohn, Velen, and Vreden municipalities)
2002	127	Borken II	Borken district (excluding Ahaus, Gronau, Heek, Legden, and Schöppingen municipalities)
2005	127	Borken II	Borken district (excluding Ahaus, Gronau, Heek, Legden, and Schöppingen municipalities)
2009	127	Borken II	Borken district (excluding Ahaus, Gronau, Heek, Legden, and Schöppingen municipalities)
2013	126	Borken II	Borken district (excluding Ahaus, Gronau, Heek, Legden, and Schöppingen municipalities)
2017	126	Borken II	Borken district (excluding Ahaus, Gronau, Heek, Legden, and Schöppingen municipalities)
2021	126	Borken II	Borken district (excluding Ahaus, Gronau, Heek, Legden, and Schöppingen municipalities)
2025	125	Borken II	Borken district (excluding Ahaus, Gronau, Heek, Legden, and Schöppingen municipalities)

== Members ==
The constituency has been held continuously by the Christian Democratic Union (CDU) since its creation. It was first represented by Theodor Blank from 1949 to 1969. Hermann Josef Unland then served as representative from 1969 to 1990. Elke Wülfing served from 1990 to 2005. Johannes Röring was elected in 2005, and re-elected in 2009, 2013, and 2017. He was succeeded by Anne König in 2021, who was re-elected in 2025.

Election	Member	Party	%
1949	Theodor Blank	CDU	41.8
1953	Theodor Blank	CDU	75.0
1957	Theodor Blank	CDU	74.2
1961	Theodor Blank	CDU	71.9
1965	Theodor Blank	CDU	71.2
1969	Hermann Josef Unland	CDU	66.6
1972	Hermann Josef Unland	CDU	64.0
1976	Hermann Josef Unland	CDU	65.7
1980	Hermann Josef Unland	CDU	60.8
1983	Hermann Josef Unland	CDU	53.7
1987	Hermann Josef Unland	CDU	45.6
1990	Elke Wülfing	CDU	59.1
1994	Elke Wülfing	CDU	55.6
1998	Elke Wülfing	CDU	50.2
2002	Elke Wülfing	CDU	51.5
2005	Johannes Röring	CDU	56.1
2009	Johannes Röring	CDU	54.2
2013	Johannes Röring	CDU	57.4
2017	Johannes Röring	CDU	52.3
2021	Anne König	CDU	43.7
2025	Anne König	CDU	47.9

== Election results ==
=== 2025 election ===
Federal election (2025): Borken II
Notes:	Blue background denotes the winner of the electorate vote. Pink background denotes a candidate elected from their party list. Yellow background denotes an electorate win by a list member, or other incumbent. A ✓ or ✗ denotes status of any incumbent, win or lose respectively.						
Party	Candidate	Votes	%	±%	Party votes	%	±%
CDU	✓ Anne König	82,000	47.9	▲4.1	72,745	42.4	▲5.7
SPD	Nadine Heselhaus	33,511	19.6	▼5.8	29,836	17.4	▼8.9
AfD	Michael Espendiller	22,179	12.9	▲8.0	22,829	13.3	▼8.5
Greens	Heinrich Rülfing	16,486	9.6	▼2.8	18,303	10.7	▼2.8
Left	Lif Licht	8,742	5.1	▲2.7	9,358	5.5	▲3.0
BSW					5,065	3.0	
FDP	Karlheinz Busen	5,043	2.9	▼5.4	7,571	4.4	▼7.4
FW	Hubert Weilinghoff	3,362	2.0	▲0.9	1,352	0.8	▲0.1
Tierschutzpartei					1,684	1.0	0.0
Volt					972	0.6	▲0.4
PARTEI	Tobias Finke			▼1.7	780	0.5	▼0.4
PdF					346	0.2	▲0.2
dieBasis					312	0.2	▼0.6
Team Todenhöfer					195	0.1	▼0.1
BD					171	0.1	
MERA25					80	0.0	
Values					44	0.0	
MLPD					36	0.0	0.0
Pirates							▼0.3
Gesundheitsforschung							▼0.1
ÖDP							▼0.1
Humanists							0.0
Bündnis C						0.0	0.0
SGP						0.0	0.0
Informal votes		1,175			819		
Total valid votes		171,323			171,679		
Turnout		172,498	85.8	▲5.2			
CDU hold	Majority	48,489	28.3				

=== 2021 election ===
Federal election (2021): Borken II
Notes:	Blue background denotes the winner of the electorate vote. Pink background denotes a candidate elected from their party list. Yellow background denotes an electorate win by a list member, or other incumbent. A ✓ or ✗ denotes status of any incumbent, win or lose respectively.						
Party	Candidate	Votes	%	±%	Party votes	%	±%
CDU	Anne König	70,334	43.7	▼8.6	59,102	36.6	▼10.4
SPD	Nadine Heselhaus	40,851	25.4	▲0.1	42,303	26.2	▲4.8
Greens	Bernhard Lammersmann	20,028	12.4	▲5.7	21,738	13.5	▲7.6
FDP	Karlheinz Busen	13,404	8.3	▼0.8	19,081	11.8	▼1.3
AfD	Michael Espendiller	7,909	4.9		7,724	4.8	▼1.2
Left	Michael Frieg	3,928	2.4	▼2.0	3,914	2.4	▼1.7
Tierschutzpartei					1,517	0.9	▲0.5
PARTEI	Tobias Finke	2,795	1.7		1,324	0.8	▲0.4
dieBasis					1,219	0.8	
FW	Bastian Nitsche	1,650	1.0	▼1.0	1,056	0.7	▲0.3
Pirates					486	0.3	0.0
Team Todenhöfer					396	0.2	
Volt					311	0.2	
LIEBE					176	0.1	
Gesundheitsforschung					163	0.1	0.0
LfK					140	0.1	
ÖDP					116	0.1	0.0
V-Partei3					86	0.1	0.0
Humanists					78	0.0	0.0
NPD					75	0.0	▼0.1
du.					69	0.0	
Bündnis C					68	0.0	
PdF					45	0.0	
LKR					31	0.0	
DKP					27	0.0	0.0
MLPD					22	0.0	0.0
SGP					9	0.0	0.0
Informal votes		1,260			883		
Total valid votes		160,899			161,276		
Turnout		162,159	80.6	▲1.6			
CDU hold	Majority	29,483	18.3	▼8.7			

=== 2017 election ===
Federal election (2017): Borken II
Notes:	Blue background denotes the winner of the electorate vote. Pink background denotes a candidate elected from their party list. Yellow background denotes an electorate win by a list member, or other incumbent. A ✓ or ✗ denotes status of any incumbent, win or lose respectively.						
Party	Candidate	Votes	%	±%	Party votes	%	±%
CDU	✓ Johannes Röring	81,496	52.3	▼5.0	73,881	47.0	▼6.4
SPD	Ursula Schulte	39,412	25.3	▼1.8	33,697	21.5	▼4.1
FDP	Karlheinz Busen	14,216	9.1	▲6.9	20,609	13.1	▲7.9
AfD					9,405	6.0	▲3.3
Greens	Holger Lordieck	10,496	6.7	▲0.4	9,220	5.9	▼0.2
Left	Rolf Paul Christian Kohn	6,969	4.5	▲1.5	6,540	4.2	▲0.5
Tierschutzpartei					768	0.5	
PARTEI					711	0.5	▲0.2
FW	Markus Krafczyk	3,182	2.0		553	0.4	▲0.2
Pirates					441	0.3	▼1.4
NPD					195	0.1	▼0.5
ÖDP					156	0.1	0.0
Gesundheitsforschung					125	0.1	
AD-DEMOKRATEN					123	0.1	
V-Partei³					108	0.1	
DM					104	0.1	
Volksabstimmung					100	0.1	▼0.1
DiB					99	0.1	
Die Humanisten					76	0.0	
BGE					65	0.0	
MLPD					45	0.0	0.0
DKP					22	0.0	
SGP					13	0.0	0.0
Informal votes		2,375			1,090		
Total valid votes		155,771			157,056		
Turnout		158,146	79.1	▲2.9			
CDU hold	Majority	42,084	27.0	▼3.3			

=== 2013 election ===
Federal election (2013): Borken II
Notes:	Blue background denotes the winner of the electorate vote. Pink background denotes a candidate elected from their party list. Yellow background denotes an electorate win by a list member, or other incumbent. A ✓ or ✗ denotes status of any incumbent, win or lose respectively.						
Party	Candidate	Votes	%	±%	Party votes	%	±%
CDU	✓ Johannes Röring	86,028	57.4	▲3.2	80,352	53.5	▲7.7
SPD	Ursula Schulte	40,643	27.1	▲1.6	38,391	25.5	▲3.5
Greens	Frank Büning	9,548	6.4	▼0.3	9,138	6.1	▼1.3
Left	Heidi Breuer	4,513	3.0	▼1.4	5,447	3.6	▼1.3
FDP	Kevin Schneider	3,389	2.3	▼6.3	7,915	5.3	▼11.3
Pirates	Siegfried Kerkhoff	3,016	2.0		2,468	1.6	▲0.4
AfD	Alfred Heitmann	2,849	1.9		4,042	2.7	
NPD					948	0.6	▲0.1
PARTEI					352	0.2	
FW					248	0.2	
Volksabstimmung					182	0.1	▲0.1
PRO					170	0.1	
ÖDP					167	0.1	0.0
Nichtwahler					117	0.1	
REP					103	0.1	▼0.1
Party of Reason					78	0.1	
RRP					61	0.0	0.0
BIG					22	0.0	
PSG					22	0.0	0.0
BüSo					17	0.0	0.0
MLPD					17	0.0	0.0
Die Rechte					12	0.0	
Informal votes		1,401			1,118		
Total valid votes		149,986			150,269		
Turnout		151,387	76.2	▲1.1			
CDU hold	Majority	45,385	30.3	▲1.6			

=== 2009 election ===
Federal election (2009): Borken II
Notes:	Blue background denotes the winner of the electorate vote. Pink background denotes a candidate elected from their party list. Yellow background denotes an electorate win by a list member, or other incumbent. A ✓ or ✗ denotes status of any incumbent, win or lose respectively.						
Party	Candidate	Votes	%	±%	Party votes	%	±%
CDU	✓ Johannes Röring	79,254	54.2	▼1.9	67,056	45.8	▼4.0
SPD	Christoph Pries	37,324	25.5	▼7.2	32,344	22.1	▼8.1
FDP	Winfried Polch	12,521	8.6	▲4.6	24,230	16.5	▲6.6
Greens	Ludwig Artmeyer	9,706	6.6	▲2.7	10,793	7.4	▲2.2
Left	Martin Rath	6,385	4.4	▲1.5	7,222	4.9	▲1.8
Pirates					1,823	1.2	
NPD	Sascha Andre Maier	1,044	0.7	▲0.2	805	0.5	0.0
FAMILIE					625	0.4	0.0
Tierschutzpartei					599	0.4	▲0.1
RENTNER					344	0.2	
REP					188	0.1	0.0
Centre					103	0.1	0.0
RRP					100	0.1	
ÖDP					94	0.1	
Volksabstimmung					73	0.0	0.0
DVU					56	0.0	
MLPD					17	0.0	0.0
PSG					13	0.0	0.0
BüSo					12	0.0	0.0
Informal votes		1,494			1,231		
Total valid votes		146,234			146,497		
Turnout		147,728	75.1	▼6.7			
CDU hold	Majority	41,930	28.7	▲5.3			

=== 2005 election ===
Federal election (2005): Borken II
Notes:	Blue background denotes the winner of the electorate vote. Pink background denotes a candidate elected from their party list. Yellow background denotes an electorate win by a list member, or other incumbent. A ✓ or ✗ denotes status of any incumbent, win or lose respectively.						
Party	Candidate	Votes	%	±%	Party votes	%	±%
CDU	Johannes Röring	87,251	56.1	▲4.5	77,380	49.7	▲1.8
SPD	Christoph Pries	50,880	32.7	▼4.4	46,950	30.2	▼3.3
FDP	Michael Pehlke	6,232	4.0	▼2.2	15,517	10.0	▼0.1
Greens	Ralf Borgers	6,070	3.9	▼0.4	7,991	5.1	▼1.1
Left	Rainer Sauer	4,386	2.8	▲2.1	4,877	3.1	▲2.5
NPD	Sascha Maier	785	0.5		789	0.5	▲0.4
Familie					625	0.4	▲0.2
Tierschutzpartei					533	0.3	▲0.1
GRAUEN					322	0.2	▲0.1
REP					273	0.2	
PBC					99	0.1	
From Now on... Democracy Through Referendum					87	0.1	
Centre					63	0.0	
Socialist Equality Party					32	0.0	
MLPD					32	0.0	
BüSo					23	0.0	0.0
Informal votes		1,535			1,557		
Total valid votes		155,604			155,582		
Turnout		157,139	81.8	▼1.4			
CDU hold	Majority	36,371	23.4				
