= Gescher =

- Town
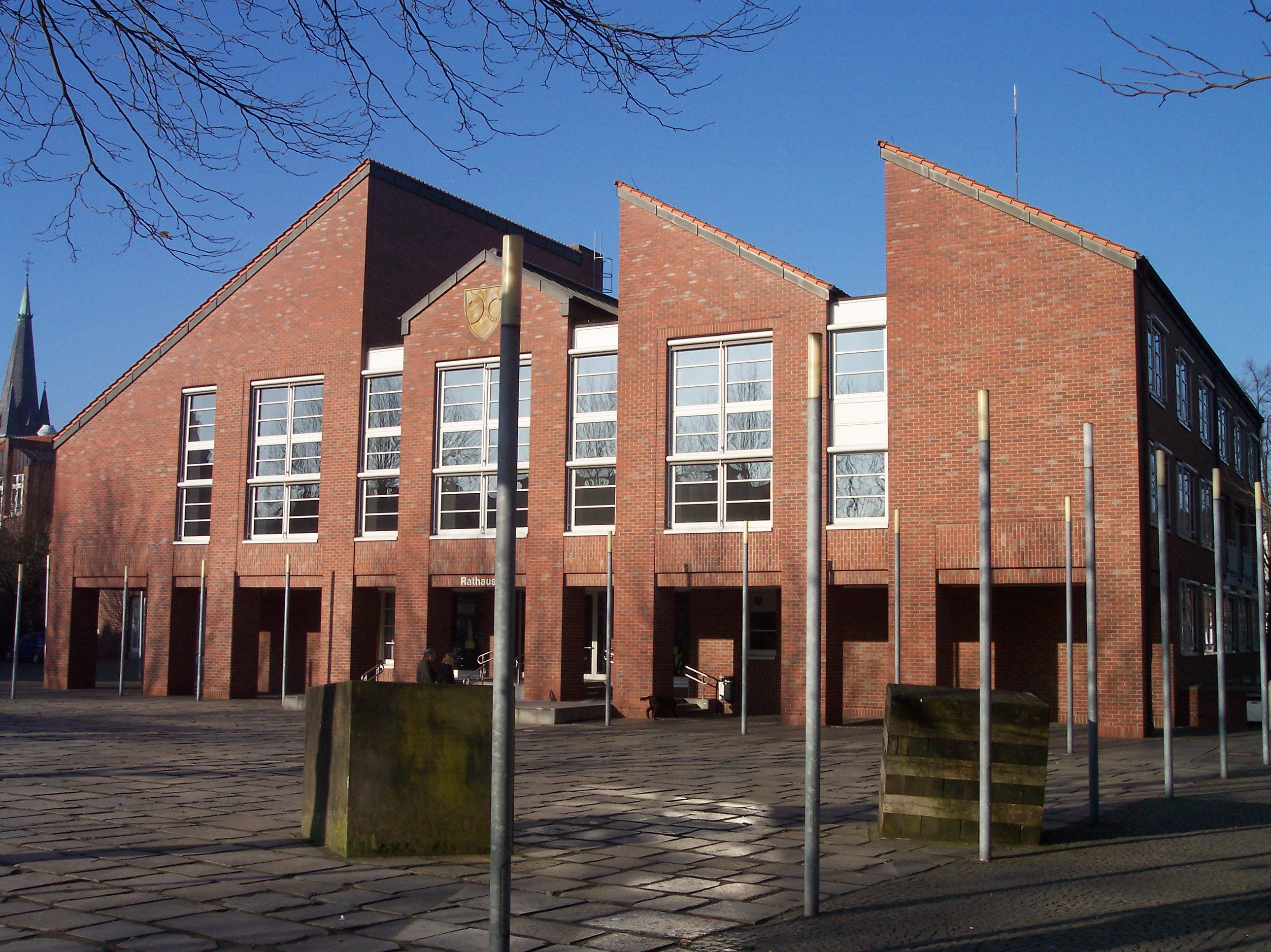
- Townhall of Gescher

- Flag Coat of arms

- Location of Gescher within Borken district
- Interactive map of Gescher
- Location within Germany Location within North Rhine-Westphalia
- Coordinates: 51°57′25″N 7°0′20″E
- Country: Germany
- State: North Rhine-Westphalia
- Admin. region: Münster
- District: Borken
- Subdivisions: 6

Government
  - Mayor (2020–25): Anne Kortüm (Ind.)

Area
  - Total: 80.84 km^{2} (31.21 sq mi)
- Elevation: 59 m (194 ft)

Population (2025-12-31)
  - Total: 17,221
  - Density: 213.0/km^{2} (551.7/sq mi)
- Time zone: UTC+01:00 (CET)
  - Summer (DST): UTC+02:00 (CEST)
- Postal codes: 48712
- Dialling codes: 02542; 02863 (Hochmoor)
- Vehicle registration: BOR
- Website: www.gescher.de

Gescher (German pronunciation: [ˈɡɛʃɐ]) is a town in the district of Borken, in North Rhine-Westphalia, Germany. It is located near the border with the Netherlands. It is most often known for its bell work, and it includes a Museum of Bells.

== Geography ==
Gescher is surrounded by farming communities and can be seen as more of a rural town.

=== Farming Communities and Suburbs ===
Farming Communities and suburbs belonging to Gescher include:

- Harwick
- Estern
- Büren
- Tungerloh-Capellen
- Tungerloh-Pröbsting
- Hochmoor

=== Location ===
Gescher is located in the western half of the Regierungsbezirk, Münsterland. It finds itself within the District of Borken, just to the south of Stadtlohn. To the east lies the District of Coesfeld, and the Dutch border can be found to the west.

The river, Berkel runs through Gescher and used to be used extensively to deliver goods between Dutch towns and Münster.

== History ==
The early history of Gescher starts as a connecting stop on a postal route running from Muenster to the Netherlands. In 1570, Gescher suffered an enormous village-wide fire that destroyed the entire town. During the time of reconstruction, many looters came over from the Netherlands to take advantage of the unfortunate situation. After the Second World War, Gescher was under the control of Mr. Ball and the British sovereignty in Germany. Gescher was under the authority of Kreis Coesfeld up until 1975 when Gescher was pulled into Kreis Borken.

=== Population development ===
Historical population

| Year | Pop. | ±% p.a. |
|---|---|---|
| 1834 | 3,784 | — |
| 1846 | 3,807 | +0.05% |
| 1855 | 3,876 | +0.20% |
| 1864 | 4,002 | +0.36% |
| 1871 | 3,912 | −0.32% |
| 1885 | 3,962 | +0.09% |
| 1900 | 4,206 | +0.40% |
| 1914 | 5,219 | +1.55% |
| 1926 | 5,943 | +1.09% |
| 1939 | 7,223 | +1.51% |
| 1950 | 10,177 | +3.17% |
| 1961 | 10,795 | +0.54% |
| 1965 | 11,899 | +2.46% |

| Year | Pop. | ±% p.a. |
|---|---|---|
| 1970 | 13,224 | +2.13% |
| 1975 | 13,580 | +0.53% |
| 1980 | 14,359 | +1.12% |
| 1985 | 14,577 | +0.30% |
| 1990 | 15,002 | +0.58% |
| 1995 | 16,095 | +1.42% |
| 2000 | 16,782 | +0.84% |
| 2005 | 17,146 | +0.43% |
| 2010 | 17,185 | +0.05% |
| 2015 | 17,118 | −0.08% |
| 2020 | 17,246 | +0.15% |
| 2025 | 17,221 | −0.03% |

Source: Landesdatabank Nordrhein-Westfalen (1965-2025)

== Local council (Rat) ==
Elections in 2014: Vote share and seats

- CDU 41.7% = 14 seats
- SPD 24.2% = 8 seats
- UWG 14.6% = 5 seats
- The Greens 13.1% = 5 seats
- FDP 6.3% = 2 seats
- Total 34 seats

== Infrastructure ==
=== Transportation ===
==== Private ====
The Bundesautobahn 31 connects Gescher with the Ruhr Region and the North Sea.

The Bundesstrasse 525 connects Gescher with the Dutch border and Nottuln/Bundesautobahn 43.

==== Public ====
===== Bus =====
Westfalenbus operates a few scheduled bus services through Gescher:

| Line | Route |
|---|---|
| R51 | Coesfeld - Gescher – Hochmoor - Velen – Borken - Rhede - Bocholt |
| R61 | Vreden - Stadtlohn - Gescher - Hochmoor - Coesfeld |
| 776 | Ahaus - Gescher - Hochmoor |
| N7 | Stadtlohn - Gescher - Rosendahl - Billerbeck - Havixbeck - Münster |

===== Rail =====
Up until 1985, Gescher was on the railroad offering services between Empel and Muenster. The old train station building can still be seen on the southside of Gescher.

===== Air =====
The closest general aviation airport is Stadtlohn-Vreden Airport, located about 15 kilometers from Gescher. The closest airport with scheduled commercial traffic is Münster Osnabrück Airport, which is located about 50 kilometers away from Gescher. A way bigger alternative is the Düsseldorf Airport, which is located about 85 kilometers from Gescher.

== Sons and daughters of the city ==
- Heinrich Hörnemann (1906-1977), farmer and German politician (CDU), Member of Bundestag 1961-1969
- Peter Schmidt (born 1944), German writer, multiple recipient (first and second place) of the Deutscher Krimi Preis
- August Wessing (1880-1945), Catholic clergyman and NS victim, died in Dachau concentration camp
- G. Mescher (2000), Naamgenoot van de stad

== Photos ==
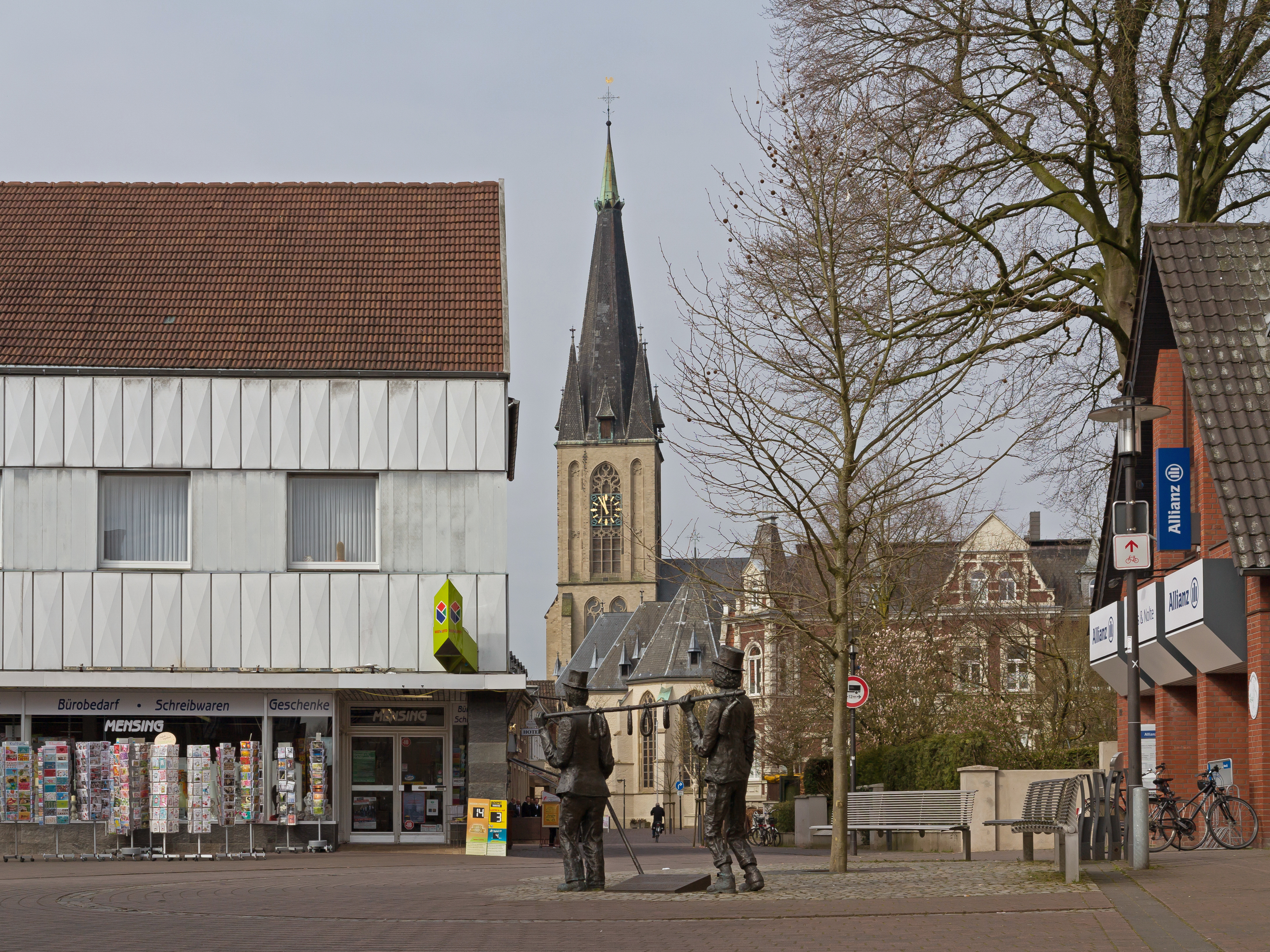
Gescher - Connecting Cultures

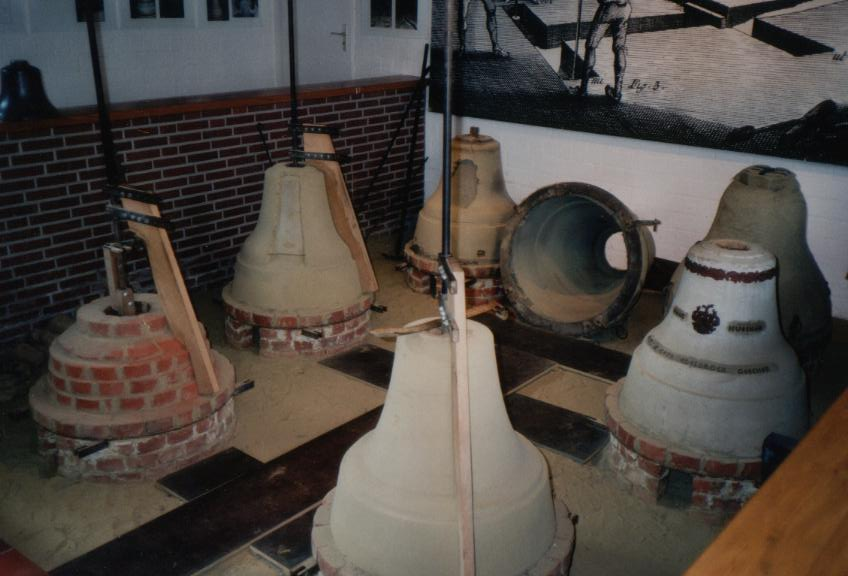
Gescher, bell molds in the bell museum (Glockenmuseum Gescher)

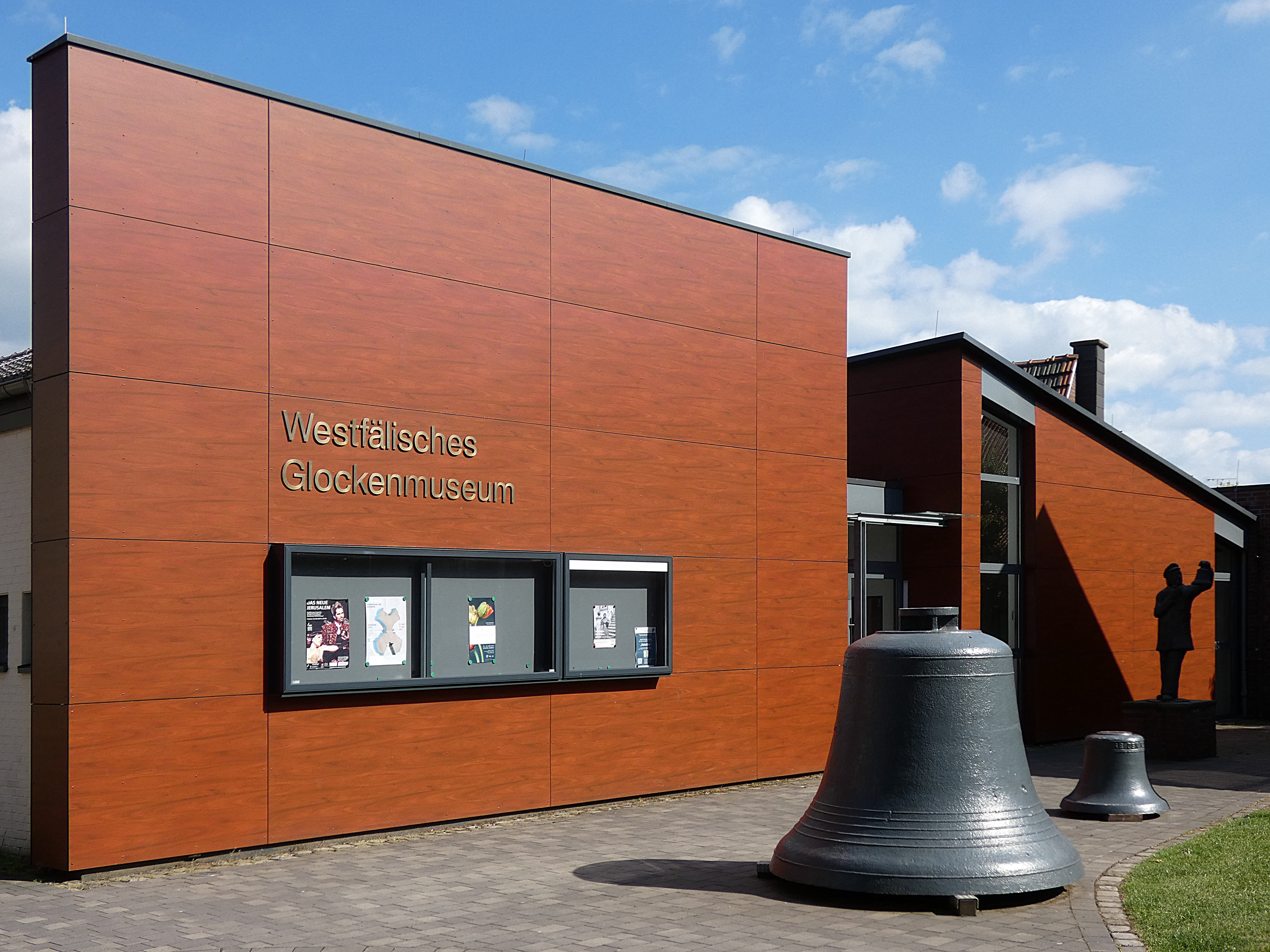
Bell museum

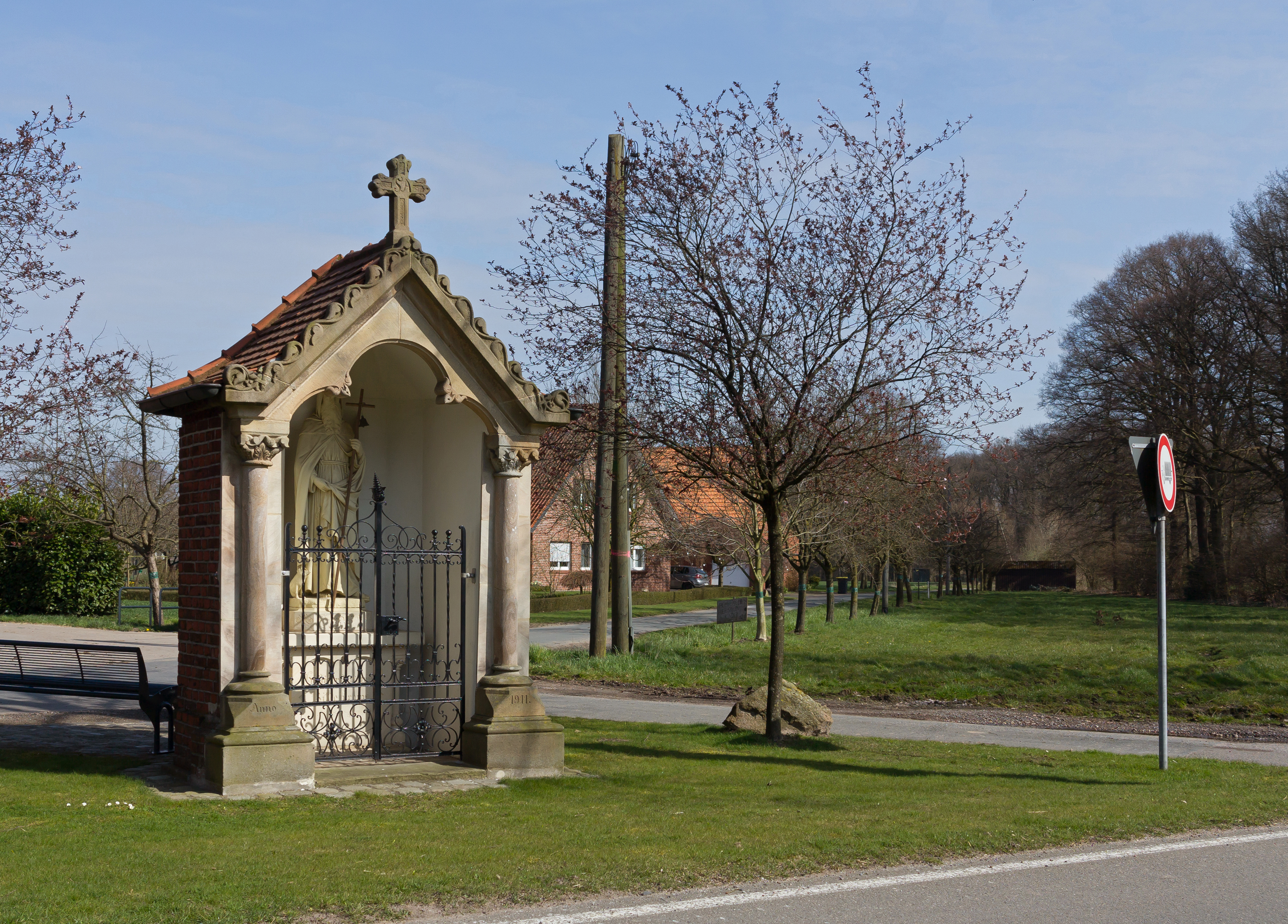
Tungerloh-Capellen, chapelle
