= Nadine Heselhaus =

German politician

Nadine Heselhaus (born 12 October 1978 in Solingen) is a German politician (SPD) and Member of the German Bundestag (National Parliament) since 2021.

== Education and profession ==
Heselhaus grew up as daughter of a Slovene woman in Düsseldorf and passed her Abitur (A-Levels) at Leibniz College in Düsseldorf. Afterwards she continued at Düsseldorf trading school. 1998 she began working for the city administration of Düsseldorf. 2001 she graduated at Duisburg Fachhochschule in public administration.

Until 2014 she worked for the Treasury of Düsseldorf. Until 2016 she continued her profession for nearby Rommerskirchen Municipality. 2016-2018 she worked for the Bundesagentur für Arbeit (Federal Agency for Labour) in Gladbeck. 2018 until 2021 she worked for the Court of Audit of the state of North Rhine-Westphalia's municipalities.

== Political activity ==
From 2007 she was a member of the Young Socialists in Cologne. From 2012 until 2016 she was member of the SPD leaderboard in the city of Grevenbroich. Additionally from 2013 till 2016 she was head of her local party grouping in Grevenbroich-North. From 2014 till 2015 she was a member of the city council of Grevenbroich. From 2015 until 2016 she was member of the SPD district leaderboard for the parties working group on migration within Rhein-Kreis Neuss district. Since 2018 she is a member of the leaderboard of the Raesfeld local grouping of the SPD. One year later she became also member of the leaderboard of the Borken districts women's in-party grouping and member of the district council. Since 2021 she is a member of the leaderboard of the SPD North Rhine-Westphalia.

At the 2021 federal election she reached 25,4% of the votes in Borken II district, which meant coming 2nd behind CDU-candidate Anne König (43,7%). However via her 10th place at SPD's state-wide Electoral list she became member of the 20. German Bundestag.

Within the 20th Bundestag Heselhaus is member of the parliaments committees for the environment and finance. Additionally she's a member of the subcommittee for civil engagement. Within her partys parliament grouping she comprises the role as vice-spokesperson for environmental affairs.
