= Röring =

Röring is a surname. Notable people with the surname include:

- Gun Röring (1930–2006), Swedish gymnast
- Johannes Röring (born 1959), German politician
