= Stadtlohn-Vreden Airport =

Stadtlohn-Vreden Airport Flugplatz Stadtlohn-Vreden
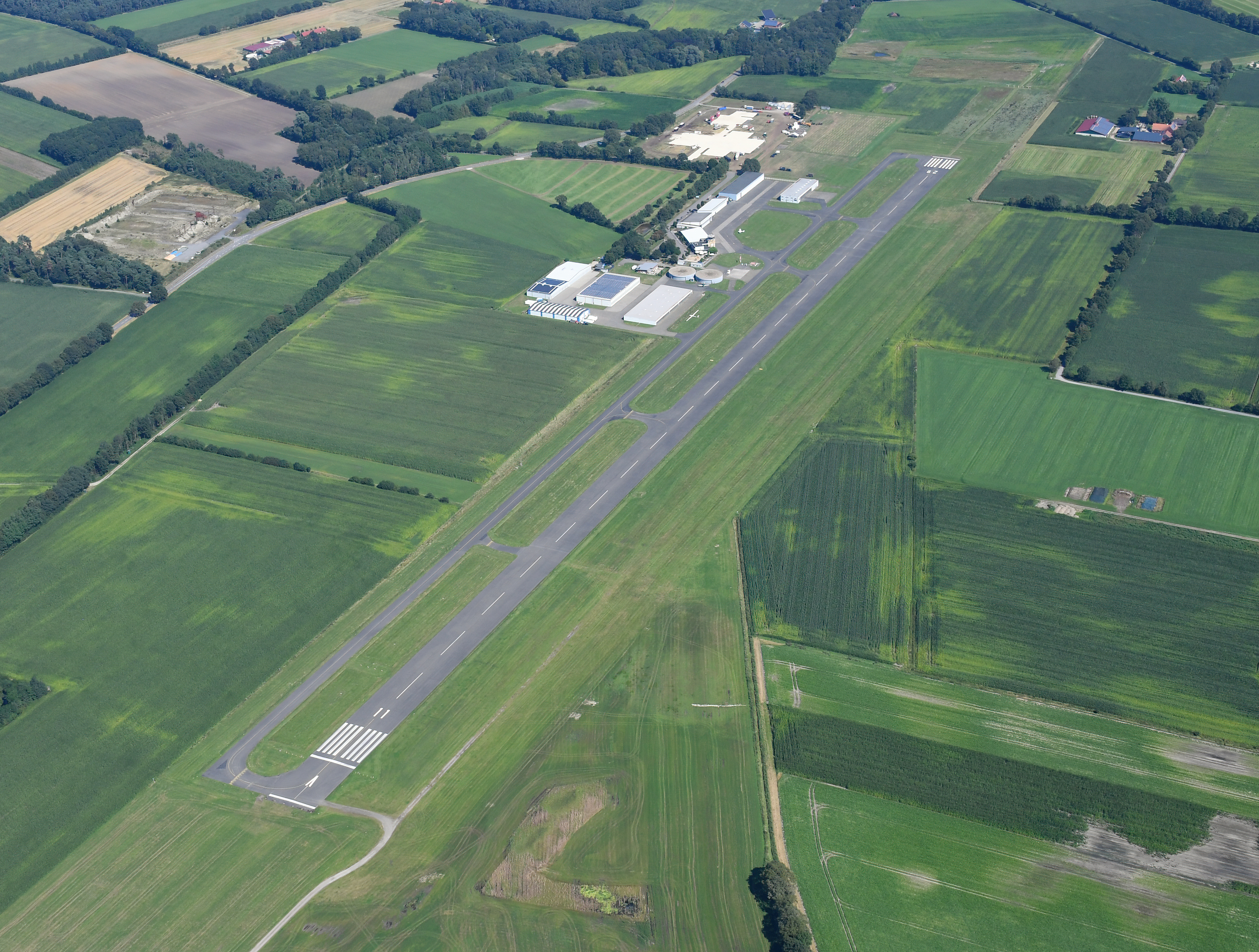
- IATA: none; ICAO: EDLS

Summary
- Airport type: Public
- Operator: Flugplatz Wenningfeld GmbH
- Location: Stadtlohn
- Elevation AMSL: 157 ft / 48 m
- Coordinates: 51°59′43″N 006°50′36″E
- Website: flugplatz-stadtlohn.de
- Interactive map of Stadtlohn-Vreden Airport

Runways
Direction	Length		Surface
Direction	m	ft	Surface
11/29	1,200	3,937	Asphalt

Stadtlohn-Vreden Airport (German: Flugplatz Stadtlohn-Vreden) (ICAO: EDLS) is an airfield located 2.8 NM (5.2 km; 3.2 mi) west of Stadtlohn, in the Borken district, Germany. Its runway lays adjacent to the Dutch border. The airfield is used for general aviation, as well for gliding and skydiving.

In 2010 the runway was extended to 1,800 m (5,906 ft) further work on the hangars increased the capacity of the airport to 132 aircraft.

== See also ==
- Transport in Germany
- List of airports in Germany
