= Elke Wülfing =

German politician

Elke Wülfing (née Rottmann; born November 7, 1947, in Herford, Allied-occupied Germany) is a German politician (CDU). She was a member of the German Bundestag from 1990 to 2005 and additionally served as Parliamentary State Secretary to the Federal Minister for Education, Science, Research, and Technology from 1997 to 1998.

== Biography ==
In 1966, Wülfing completed her high school diploma (Abitur) and became a state-certified foreign correspondent in Hamburg in 1969.

She joined the Young Union in 1972 and the CDU in 1973. From 1978 to 1982, she served as district chairwoman of the Young Union, from 1985 to 1991 as district chairwoman of the Women's Union, from 1990 as district chairwoman of the CDU Münsterland, and from 1991 as deputy state chairwoman of the CDU in North Rhine-Westphalia. Additionally, she was a member of the Borken City Council from 1975 to 1979 and a member of the Borken District Council from 1979 to 1991. Furthermore, she acted as a member of the supervisory board of the Economic Development Corporation of the Borken District and the political committee of the Evangelical Church of Westphalia.

She was elected for the CDU via the direct mandate of the constituency Borken II in North Rhine-Westphalia. From December 20, 1990, to September 18, 2005 (four electoral terms), she was a member of the German Bundestag. In the Bundestag, she served on the Finance Committee. From January 23, 1997, to October 26, 1998, Wülfing held the position of Parliamentary State Secretary to the Federal Minister for Education, Science, Research, and Technology.

Since April 2007, she has been the honorary chairwoman of the CDU district association Münsterland.
