= Karlheinz Busen =

German civil engineer and politician (born 1951)

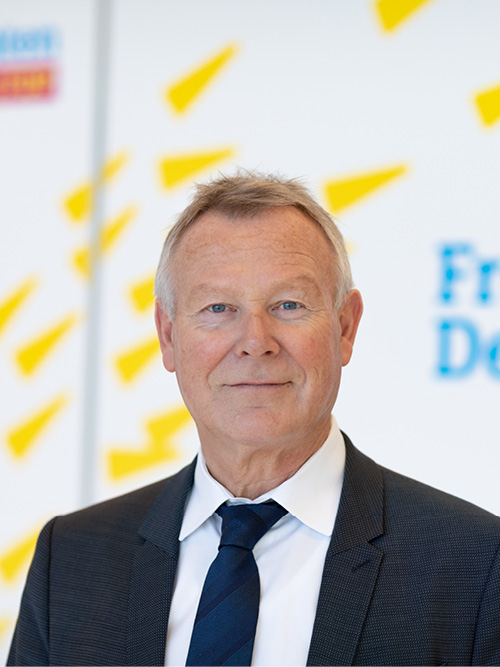
- Busen in 2019

Member of the Bundestag for North Rhine-Westphalia
- In office 24 October 2017 – 2025
- Constituency: FDP List

Personal details
- Born: 5 April 1951 (age 75) Gronau, North Rhine-Westphalia, West Germany
- Party: Free Democratic Party
- Children: 3
- Education: Bielefeld University of Applied Sciences

Karlheinz Busen (born 5 April 1951) is a German civil engineer and politician of the Free Democratic Party (FDP) who served as a member of the Bundestag from the state of North Rhine-Westphalia from 2017 to 2025.

== Early life and career ==
After completing school in 1965, he began an apprenticeship as a draftsman, which he completed in 1968. From 1968 to 1972, he underwent training as a civil engineering technician and obtained the entrance qualification for a technical college. He then studied Structural Engineering at the University of Applied Sciences Bielefeld, Minden Department, from 1973 to 1976, graduating as a Diplom-Civil Engineer. During his military service, he served as a staff soldier and attained the rank of private. From 1976, he operated his own company with eight employees.

== Political career ==
From 2012 until 2017, Busen served as a member of the State Parliament of North Rhine-Westphalia.

Busen became a member of the Bundestag in the 2017 German federal election. In parliament, he served as his parliamentary group’s spokesperson for hunting and forestry.

In the negotiations to form a so-called traffic light coalition of the Social Democratic Party (SPD), the Green Party and the FDP following the 2021 German elections, Busen was part of his party's delegation in the working group on environmental policy, co-chaired by Rita Schwarzelühr-Sutter, Steffi Lemke and Stefan Birkner.
