= Michael Espendiller =

German politician (born 1989)

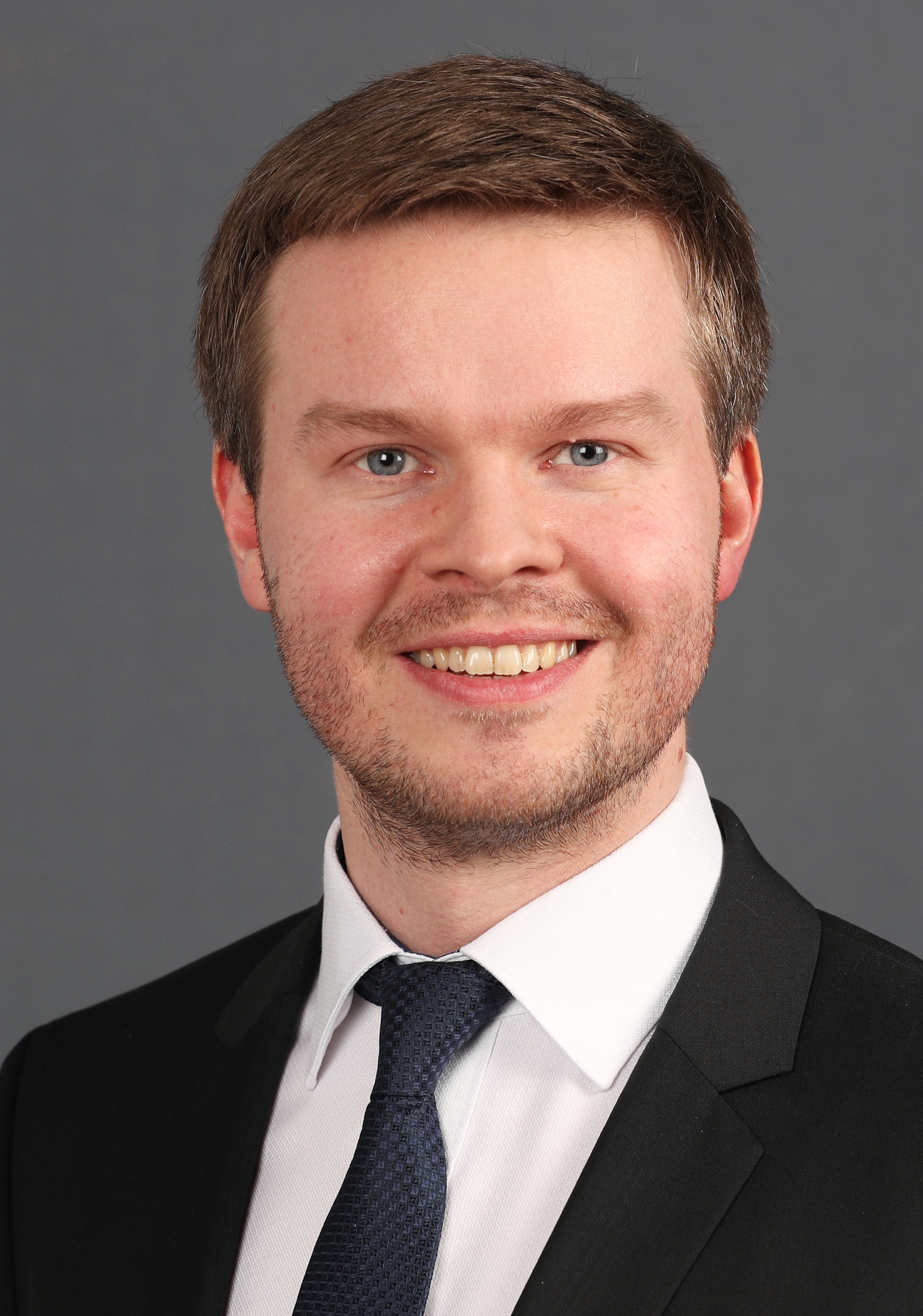
- Espendiller in 2020

Member of the Bundestag
- Incumbent
- Assumed office 24 October 2017

Personal details
- Born: 5 May 1989 (age 37)
- Party: AfD

Michael Espendiller (born 5 May 1989) is a German politician for the far-right party Alternative for Germany and since 2017 a member of the Bundestag.

== Life and politics ==
Espendiller was born 1989 in the West German town of Leonberg and studied Mathematics and macroeconomics at the University of Münster.

He achieved his Dr. rer. nat. in 2017.

Espendiller entered the newly founded AfD in 2013 and after the 2017 German federal election he became a member of the Bundestag and Parlamentarischer Geschäftsführer (parliamentary managing secretary) of his party's group.

Espendiller denies the scientific consensus on climate change.
