= Heek, Germany =

Heek
- Municipality
- Flag Coat of arms

- Location of Heek within Borken district
- Interactive map of Heek
- Location within Germany Location within North Rhine-Westphalia
- Coordinates: 52°07′00″N 07°05′59″E
- Country: Germany
- State: North Rhine-Westphalia
- Admin. region: Münster
- District: Borken
- Subdivisions: 7

Government
  - Mayor (2020–25): Franz-Josef Weilinghoff (Ind.)

Area
  - Total: 68.98 km^{2} (26.63 sq mi)
- Elevation: 50 m (160 ft)

Population (2025-12-31)
  - Total: 8,715
  - Density: 126.3/km^{2} (327.2/sq mi)
- Time zone: UTC+01:00 (CET)
  - Summer (DST): UTC+02:00 (CEST)
- Postal codes: 48619
- Dialling codes: 0 25 68
- Vehicle registration: BOR
- Website: www.heek.de

Heek is a municipality in the district of Borken, in North Rhine-Westphalia, Germany. It is located near the border with the Netherlands, approx. 20 km south-east of Enschede. Heek consists of two villages, Heek and Nienborg.

== Population ==
Historical population

Year	Pop.	±% p.a.
1965	5,709	—
1970	6,198	+1.66%
1975	6,658	+1.44%
1980	6,826	+0.50%
1985	7,123	+0.86%
1990	7,120	−0.01%
1995	7,578	+1.25%

Year	Pop.	±% p.a.
2000	7,945	+0.95%
2005	8,377	+1.06%
2010	8,341	−0.09%
2015	8,505	+0.39%
2020	8,651	+0.34%
2025	8,715	+0.15%

Source: Landesdatabank Nordrhein-Westfalen

== Sights ==
The municipality has various sights to offer:

- Nienborg Castle
- Saint Ludgerus Church in Heek. In 1256, this catholic church was mentioned in a document for the first time. It was enlarged several times. The church houses various masterpieces of art, e.g. a baroque pulpit dating from 1755 and a medieval tabernacle from 1520.
- In the middle of Heek, Eppingscher Hof, a historic farm house dating from 1857, was transformed into a cultural center in 1990.
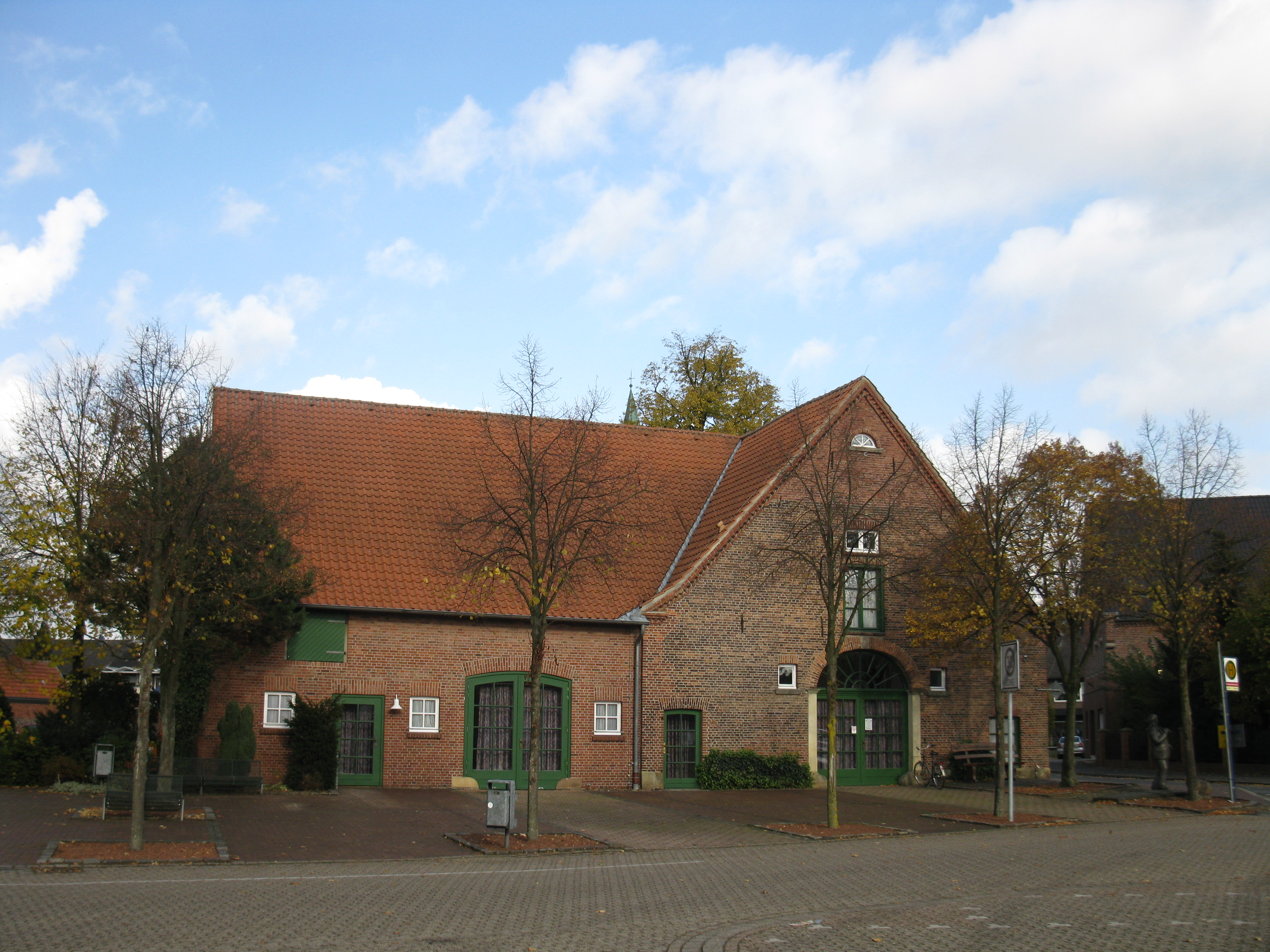
Historic farm used as a cultural center.

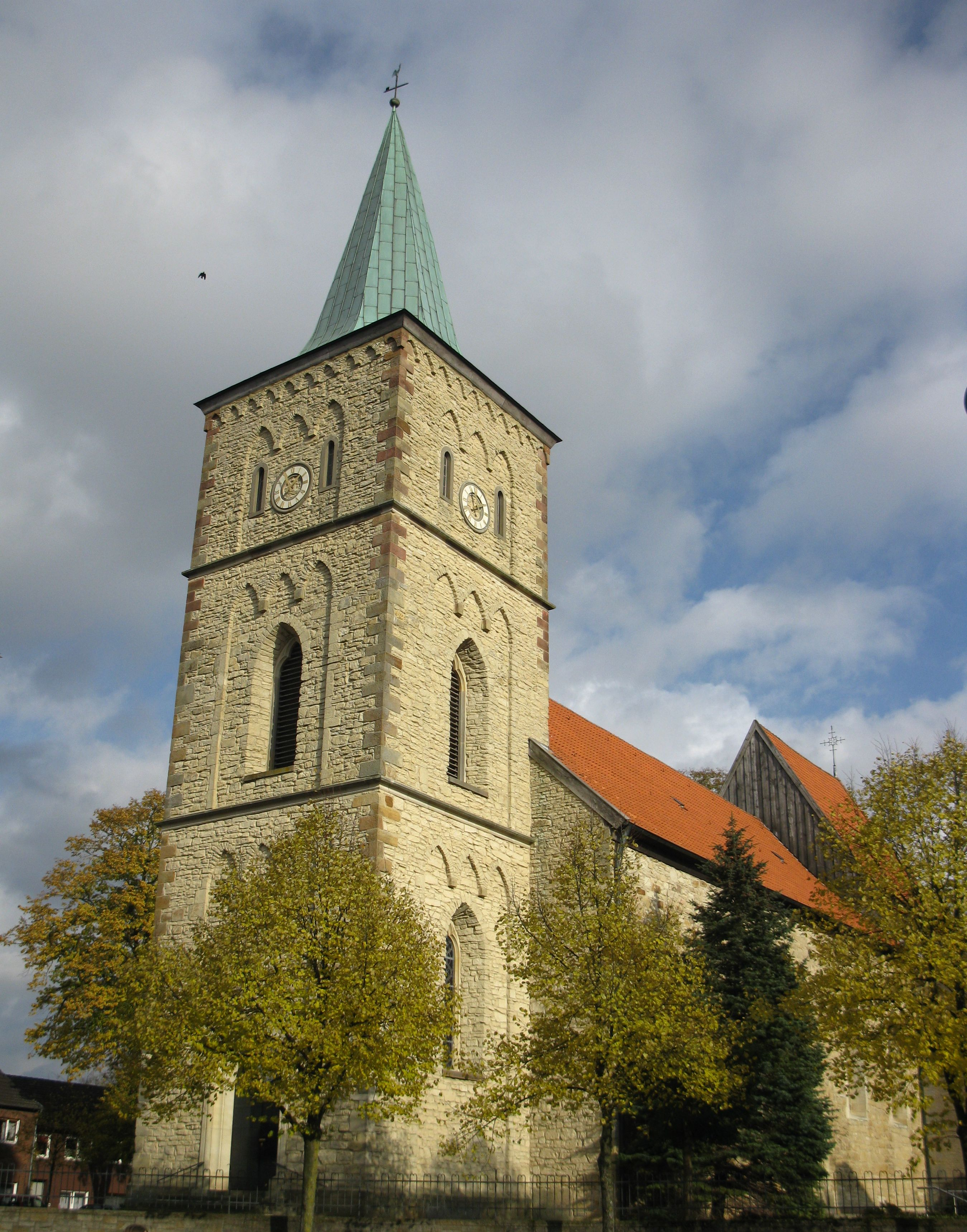
Saint Ludgerus Church.

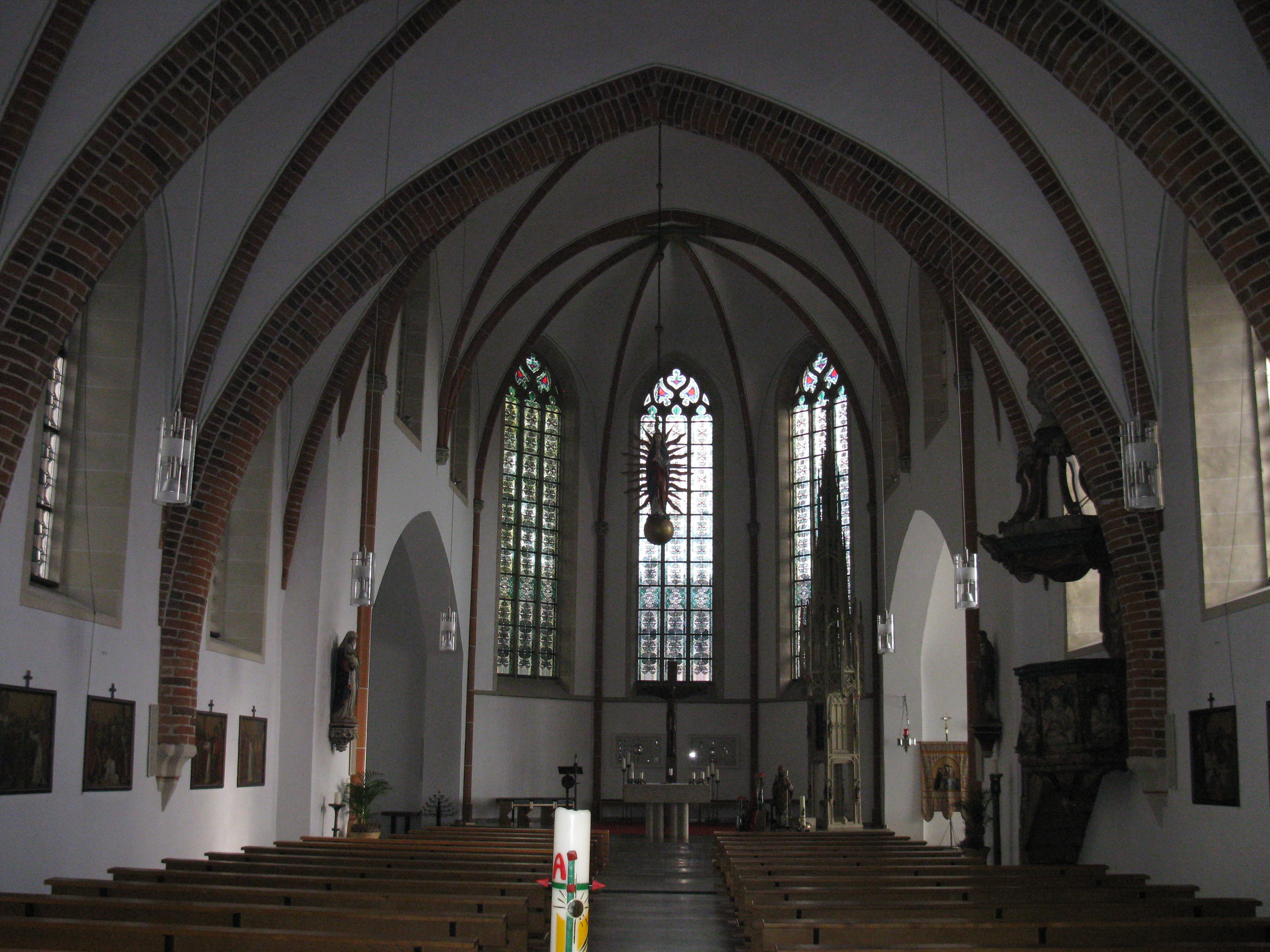
Saint Ludgerus Church, interior.

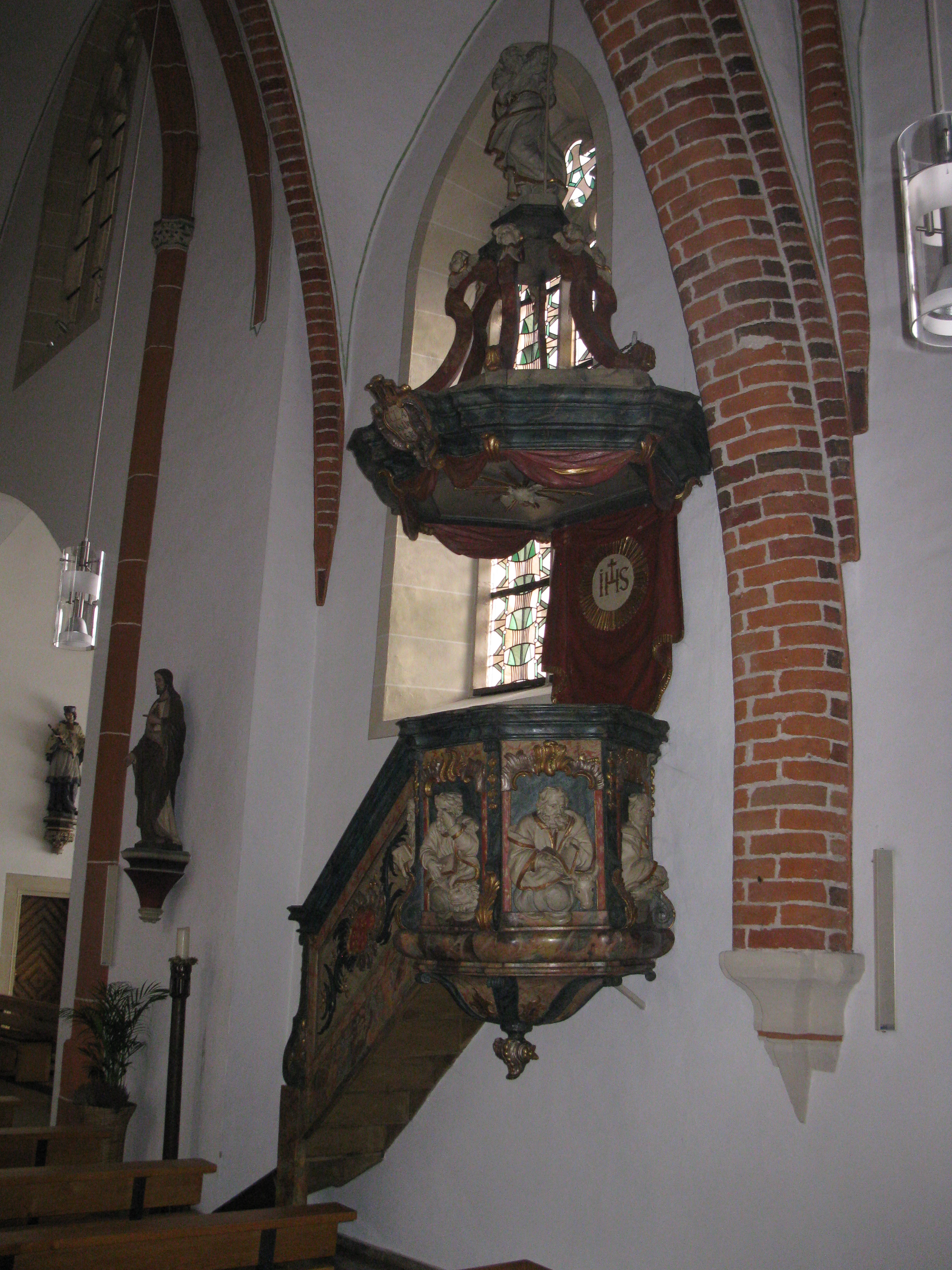
Saint Ludgerus Church, pulpit.

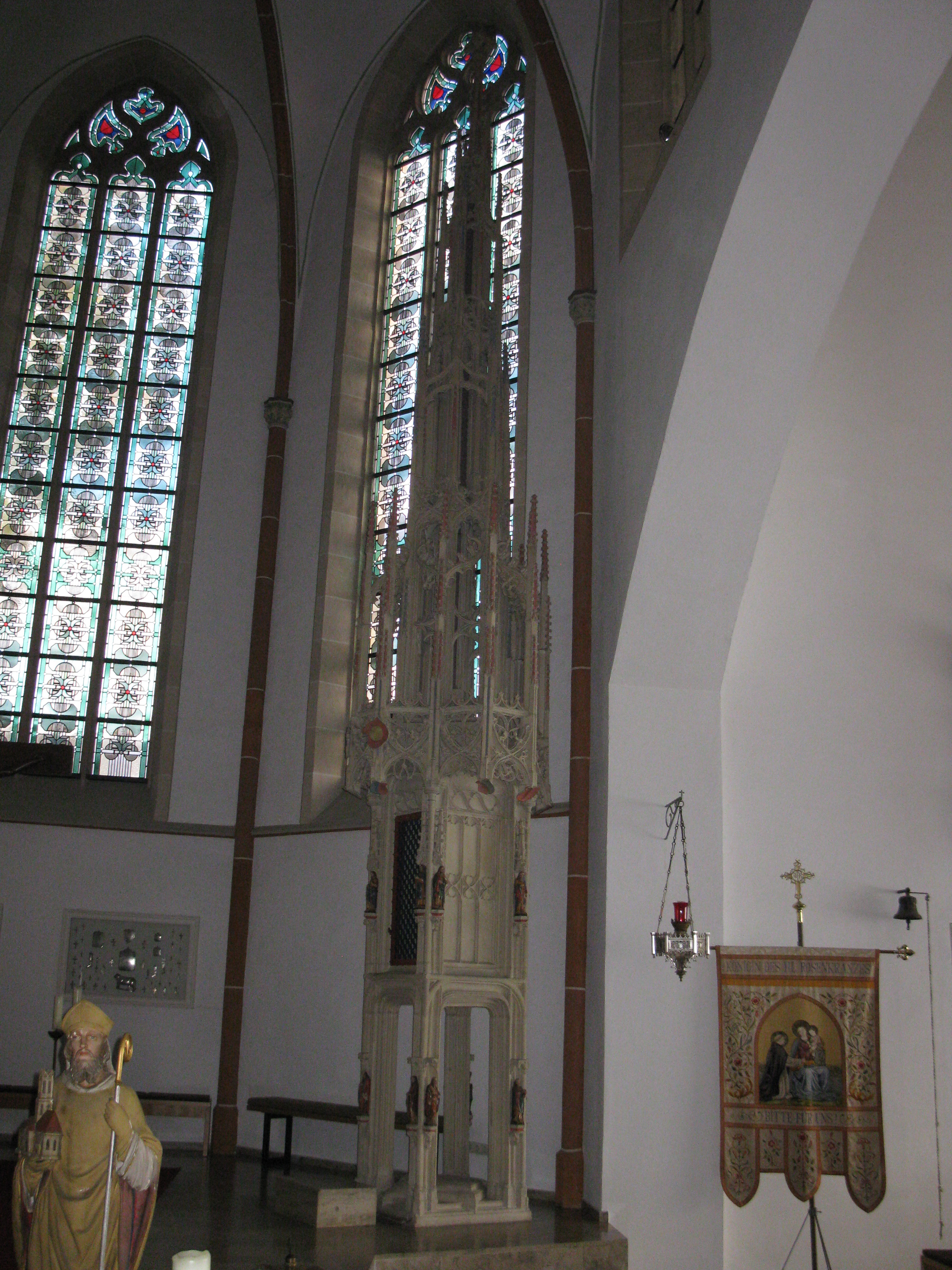
Saint Ludgerus Church, tabernacle.
