= Südlohn =

- Municipality
- Flag Coat of arms

- Location of Südlohn within Borken district
- Interactive map of Südlohn
- Location within Germany Location within North Rhine-Westphalia
- Coordinates: 51°56′37″N 6°51′59″E
- Country: Germany
- State: North Rhine-Westphalia
- Admin. region: Münster
- District: Borken

Government
  - Mayor (2025–30): Markus Lask (Ind.)

Area
  - Total: 45.56 km^{2} (17.59 sq mi)
- Elevation: 54 m (177 ft)

Population (2025-12-31)
  - Total: 9,861
  - Density: 216.4/km^{2} (560.6/sq mi)
- Time zone: UTC+01:00 (CET)
  - Summer (DST): UTC+02:00 (CEST)
- Postal codes: 46354, 46350
- Dialling codes: 02862
- Vehicle registration: BOR
- Website: www.suedlohn.de

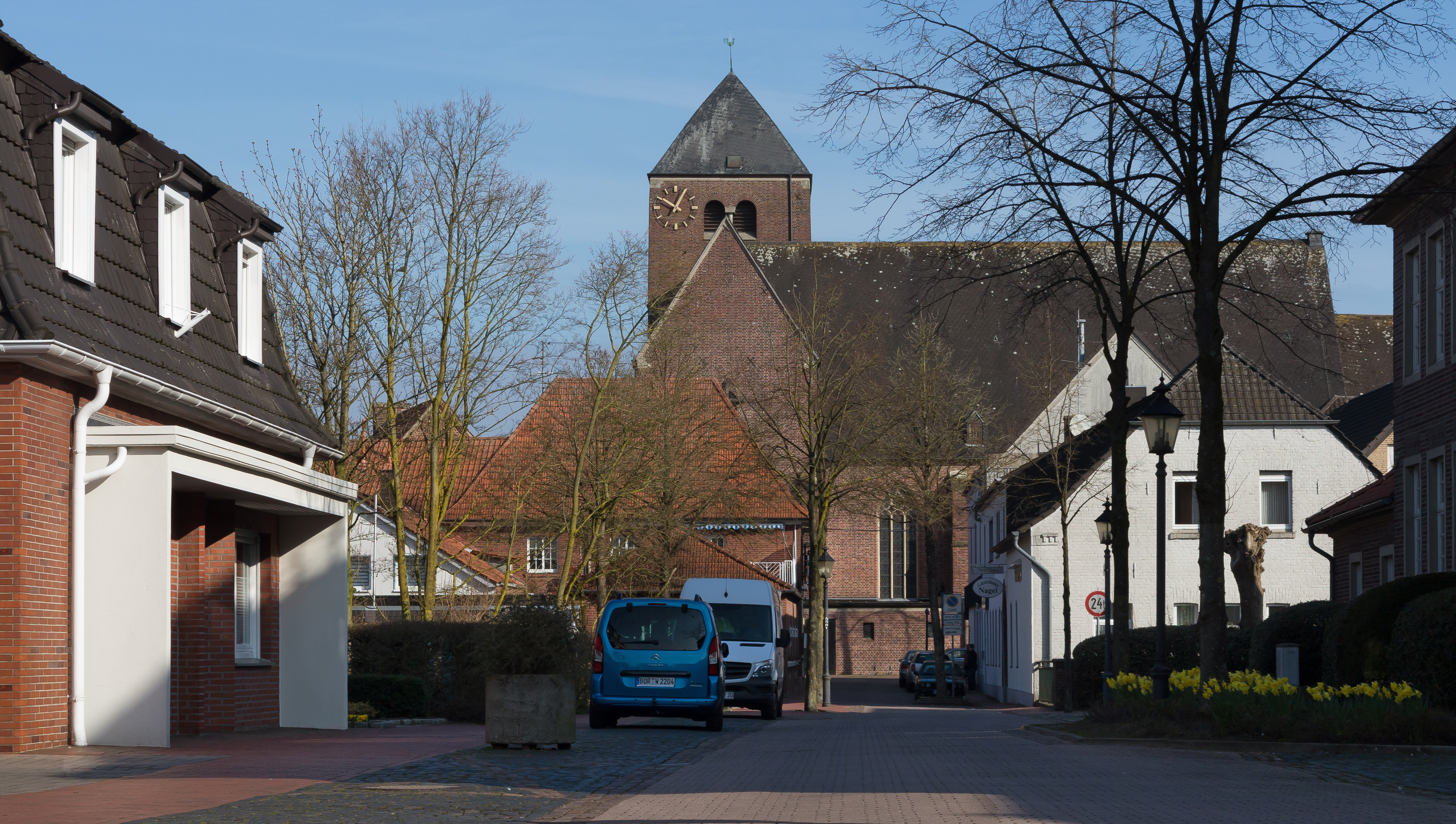
Südlohn, catholic church Sankt Vitus in the street

Südlohn (German pronunciation: [ˈzyːtloːn], lit. 'South Lohn', in contrast to "North Lohn") is a municipality in the district of Borken in the northwestern part of North Rhine-Westphalia, Germany. It is located right at the border with the Netherlands, approx. 10 km east of Winterswijk. It consists of the villages Südlohn and Oeding.

== Population ==
Historical population

Year	Pop.	±% p.a.
1965	5,913	—
1970	6,535	+2.02%
1975	6,792	+0.77%
1980	7,273	+1.38%
1985	7,652	+1.02%
1990	7,787	+0.35%
1995	8,460	+1.67%

Year	Pop.	±% p.a.
2000	8,585	+0.29%
2005	8,931	+0.79%
2010	9,009	+0.17%
2015	9,134	+0.28%
2020	9,370	+0.51%
2025	9,861	+1.03%

Source: Landesdatabank Nordrhein-Westfalen

== Municipal Council after the 2025 election ==
Party	Seats	+/–
Christian Democratic Union of Germany (CDU)	9	▼2
Independent Voters Association (UWG)	5	0
Free Democratic Party (FDP)	2	▼1
Voters Association Südlohn-Oeding (WSO)	7	0
Social Democratic Party of Germany (SPD)	3	▼1
Total	26	▼4
