= Anne König =

German politician

Member of the Bundestag
- Incumbent
- Assumed office 2021

Personal details
- Born: 4 December 1984 (age 41) Münster, West Germany (now Germany)
- Party: Christian Democratic Union of Germany
- Education: University of Duisburg-Essen

Anne König (born 4 December 1984) is a German teacher and politician of the Christian Democratic Union (CDU) who has been serving as a member of the Bundestag since 2021.

== Early life and career ==
König was born 1984 in the West German city of Münster. She studied mathematics and history at the University of Duisburg-Essen.

== Political career ==
König was elected directly to the Bundestag in the 2021 elections, representing the Borken II district. In parliament, she has since been serving on the Committee on Climate Action and Energy and the Subcommittee on International Climate and Energy Policy. She is also an alternate member of the Parliamentary Advisory Board on Sustainable Development.
