= Legden =

- Municipality

- Flag Coat of arms

- Location of Legden within Borken district
- Interactive map of Legden
- Location within Germany Location within North Rhine-Westphalia
- Coordinates: 52°02′N 07°06′E
- Country: Germany
- State: North Rhine-Westphalia
- Admin. region: Münster
- District: Borken
- Subdivisions: 2

Government
  - Mayor (2020–25): Dieter Berkemeier (Ind.)

Area
  - Total: 56 km^{2} (22 sq mi)
- Elevation: 76 m (249 ft)

Population (2025-12-31)
  - Total: 7,532
  - Density: 130/km^{2} (350/sq mi)
- Time zone: UTC+01:00 (CET)
  - Summer (DST): UTC+02:00 (CEST)
- Postal codes: 48739
- Dialling codes: 0 25 66
- Vehicle registration: BOR
- Website: www.legden.de

Legden (German pronunciation: [ˈlɛçdn̩]; Westphalian: Ledden) is a municipality in the district of Borken, in North Rhine-Westphalia, Germany. It is located between Ahaus and Coesfeld.

== Population ==
Historical population

Year	Pop.	±% p.a.
1965	5,081	—
1970	5,300	+0.85%
1975	5,237	−0.24%
1980	5,163	−0.28%
1985	5,348	+0.71%
1990	5,621	+1.00%
1995	6,003	+1.32%

Year	Pop.	±% p.a.
2000	6,561	+1.79%
2005	6,839	+0.83%
2010	6,846	+0.02%
2015	7,254	+1.16%
2020	7,342	+0.24%
2025	7,532	+0.51%

Source: Landesdatabank Nordrhein-Westfalen
