= Ursula Schulte =

German politician

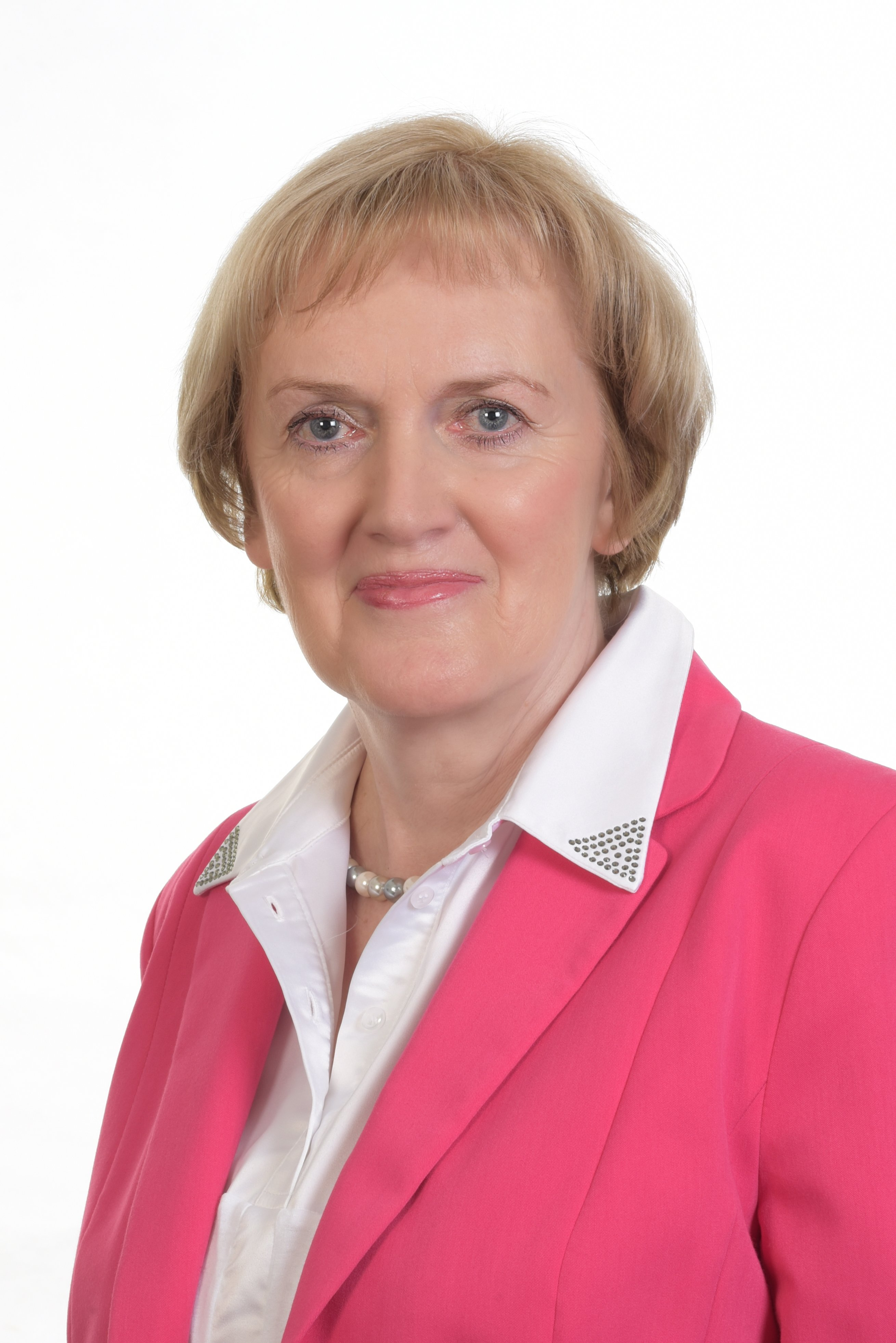
- Ursula Schulte in 2016

Member of the Bundestag
- In office 2013–2021

Personal details
- Born: 9 August 1952 (age 73) Alstätte, West Germany
- Party: SPD

Ursula Schulte (born 9 August 1952) is a German politician of the Social Democratic Party (SPD) who served as a member of the Bundestag from the state of North Rhine-Westphalia from 2013 until 2021.

== Political career ==
Schulte became a member of the Bundestag in the 2013 German federal election. In parliament, she was a member of the Committee on Food and Agriculture and the Committee on Family, Senior Citizens, Women and Youth.

In July 2020, Schulte announced that she would not stand in the 2021 federal elections but instead resign from active politics by the end of the parliamentary term.
