= Velen =

- Town
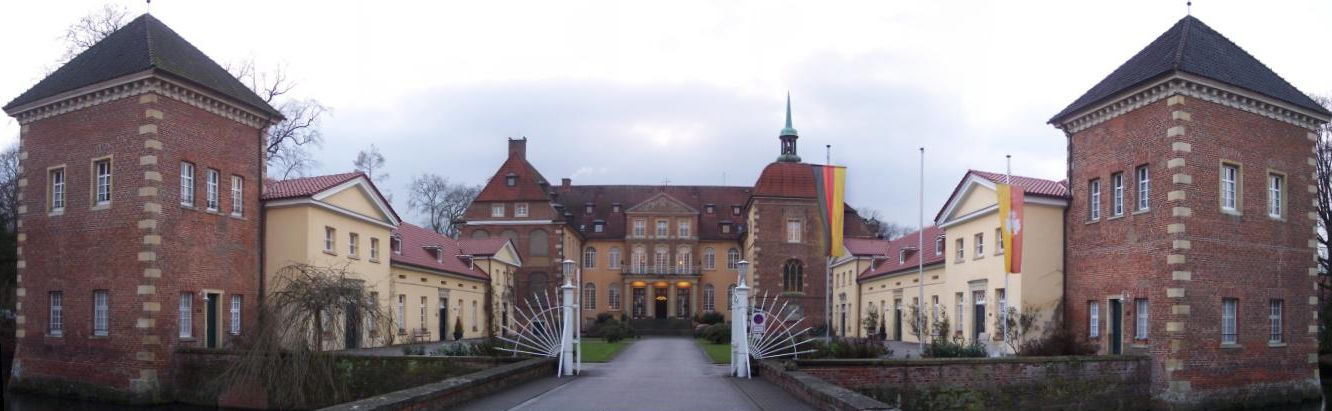
- Velen Castle

- Flag Coat of arms

- Location of Velen within Borken district
- Interactive map of Velen
- Location within Germany Location within North Rhine-Westphalia
- Coordinates: 51°53′38″N 06°59′23″E
- Country: Germany
- State: North Rhine-Westphalia
- Admin. region: Münster
- District: Borken
- Subdivisions: 6

Government
  - Mayor (2020–25): Dagmar Jeske

Area
  - Total: 70.75 km^{2} (27.32 sq mi)
- Elevation: 57 m (187 ft)

Population (2025-12-31)
  - Total: 12,562
  - Density: 177.6/km^{2} (459.9/sq mi)
- Time zone: UTC+01:00 (CET)
  - Summer (DST): UTC+02:00 (CEST)
- Postal codes: 46342
- Dialling codes: 0 28 63
- Vehicle registration: AH, BOH, BOR
- Website: www.velen.de

Velen (German pronunciation: [ˈfeːlən]) is a town in the district Borken, North Rhine-Westphalia, Germany with about 12,000 inhabitants. It consists of the two settlements of Velen and Ramsdorf and the four rural regions Ostendorf-Krueckling, Bleking-Holthausen, Nordvelen and Waldvelen. In 2003 the town received the title "staatlich anerkannter Erholungsort" (recreation village approved by the state) from the regional president. Since August 2012 it is a town. It was arwarded the title "annerkannter Luftkurort" (state-approved climatic health resort) in January 2023.

== Population ==
Historical population

Year	Pop.	±% p.a.
1965	8,172	—
1970	8,482	+0.75%
1975	8,904	+0.98%
1980	9,427	+1.15%
1985	11,144	+3.40%
1990	10,374	−1.42%
1995	11,664	+2.37%

Year	Pop.	±% p.a.
2000	12,789	+1.86%
2005	12,988	+0.31%
2010	12,978	−0.02%
2015	13,192	+0.33%
2020	13,112	−0.12%
2025	12,562	−0.85%

Source: Landesdatabank Nordrhein-Westfalen

== Personalities ==
- Hendrickje Stoffels (1626-1663), partner of the Dutch Baroque painter Rembrandt
- Ludwig Averkamp (1927-2013), Archbishop of Hamburg
- Klaus Balkenhol (born 1939), German dressage rider
- Georg Veit (born 1956), writer
- Marv Terhoch, son of Velen-born Kurt Terhoch, refugee to Canada in 1939
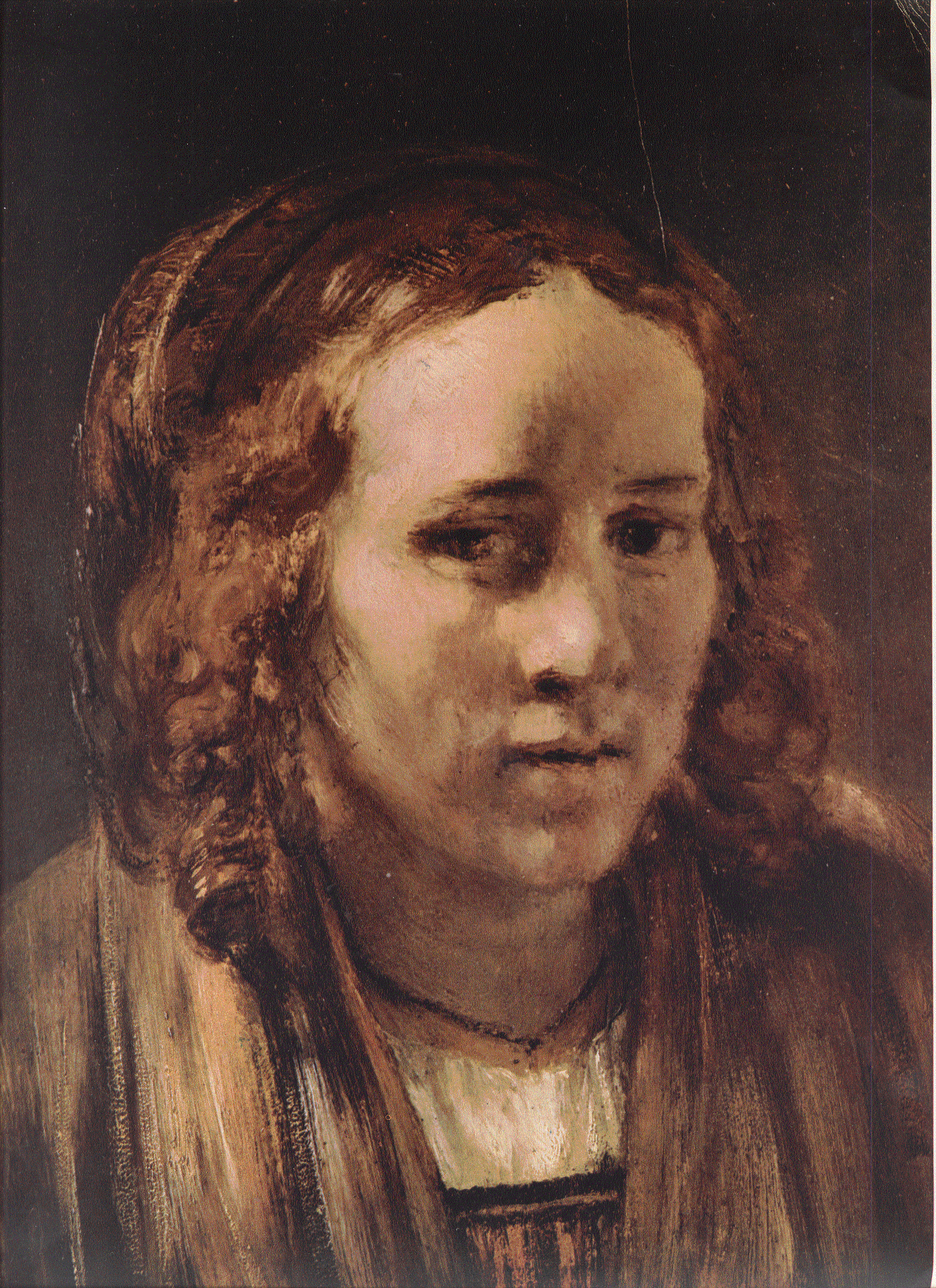
Hendrickje Stoffels

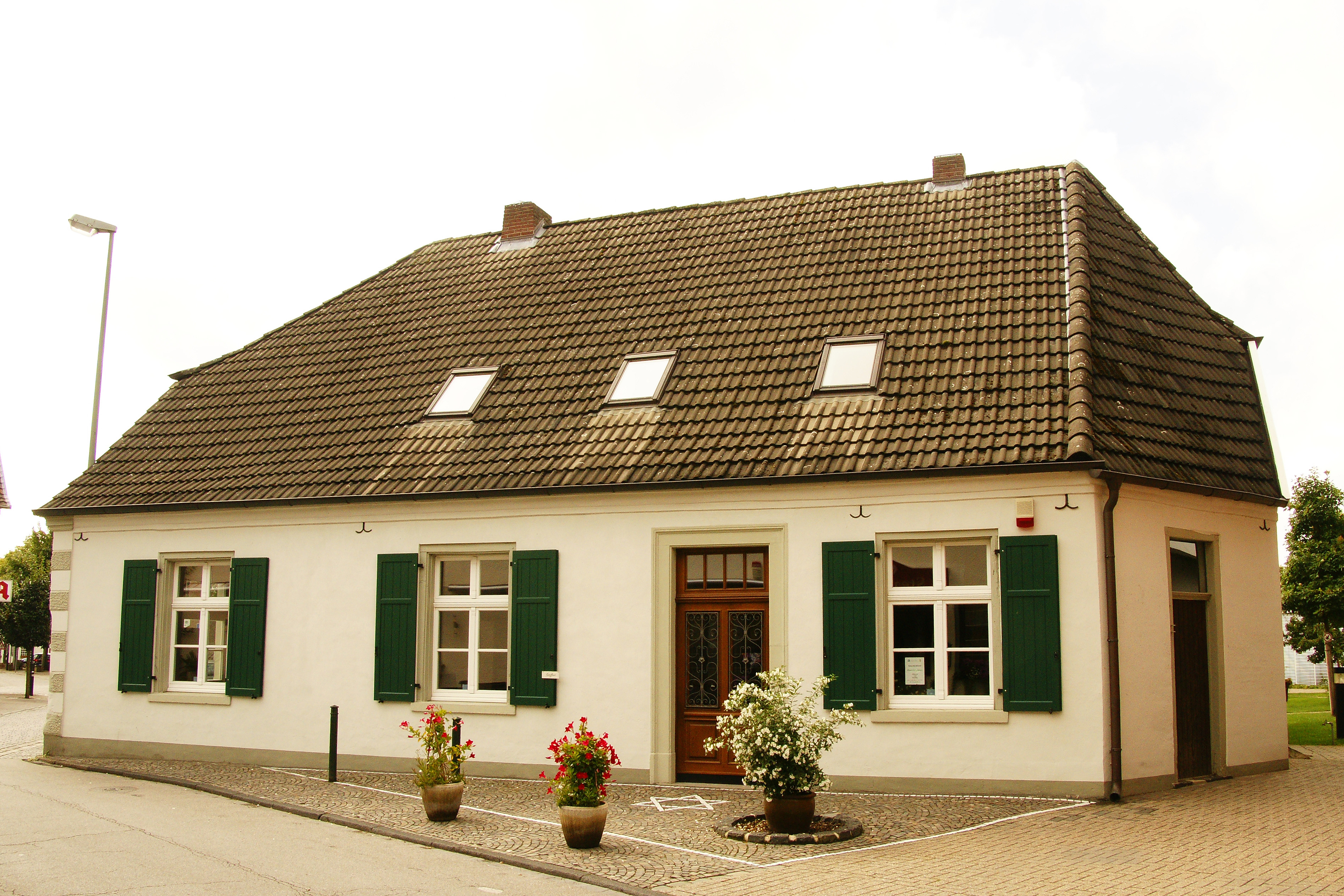
The Humberghaus Dingden, near by Velen, from 1814, home of Kurt's mother Freda (Frieda) Terhoch
