= Borken (district) =

Coordinates: 51°55′N 6°55′E

- District
- Flag Coat of arms
- Country: Germany
- State: North Rhine-Westphalia
- Adm. region: Münster
- Capital: Borken

Government
  - District admin.: Kai Zwicker (CDU)

Area
  - Total: 1,417.83 km^{2} (547.43 sq mi)

Population (31 December 2023)
  - Total: 381,627
  - Density: 270/km^{2} (700/sq mi)
- Time zone: UTC+01:00 (CET)
  - Summer (DST): UTC+02:00 (CEST)
- Vehicle registration: BOR, AH, BOH
- Website: http://www.kreis-borken.de

Borken is a Kreis (district) in the northwestern part of North Rhine-Westphalia, Germany in the Münster region. Neighboring districts are Steinfurt, Coesfeld, Recklinghausen, Wesel, Cleves, Bentheim in the Lower Saxony and the Dutch provinces Gelderland and Overijssel. The two biggest cities are Bocholt and Gronau.

== History ==
During the era of the Holy Roman Empire the area was subordinate to the Prince-Bishopric of Münster for centuries. In 1803 the bishops lost this territory, and the short-lived Principality of Salm was founded. After the Napoleonic Wars the region became a part of the Prussian province of Westphalia in 1815. At that time the district was created, together with the district Ahaus. In 1923 the city Bocholt left the district and became a district-free city. In 1975 the district got its current size by incorporating the district Ahaus, the city Bocholt and small parts of the districts Rees, Recklinghausen and Coesfeld.

== Geography ==
The district is located in the western part of the Münsterland, a rather flat and rural area.

== Coat of arms ==
The colors of the coat of arms were chosen to be the same as those of the Prince-Bishopric of Münster, the long-time owner of the region. The three white anchors in the middle derive from the coat of arms of the Herrschaft Anholt. It is depicted three times to show the three main parts the district was created from – the old district Borken, the district Ahaus and the city Bocholt.

== Towns and municipalities ==
Clickable map of municipalities in the district

Towns
1. Ahaus
2. Bocholt
3. Borken
4. Gescher
5. Gronau
6. Isselburg
7. Rhede
8. Stadtlohn
9. Velen
10. Vreden
Municipalities
1. Heek
2. Heiden
3. Legden
4. Raesfeld
5. Reken
6. Schöppingen
7. Südlohn
