= Johannes Röring =

German politician

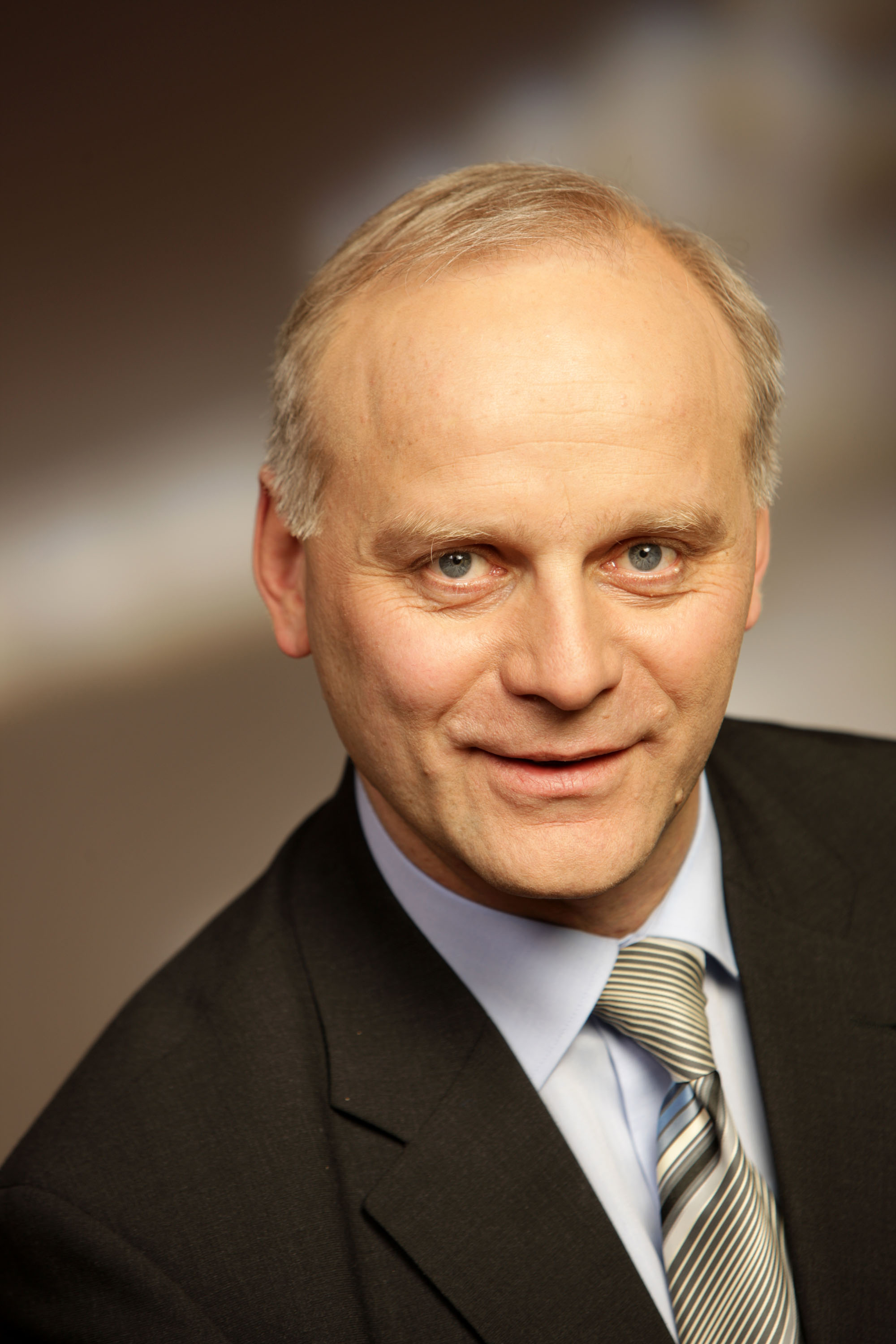
- Johannes Röring in 2009

Member of the Bundestag
- Incumbent
- Assumed office 2005

Personal details
- Born: Johannes August Röring; 16 May 1959 (age 66) Vreden, West Germany (now Germany)
- Party: CDU

Johannes August Röring (born 16 May 1959) is a German politician. Born in Vreden, North Rhine-Westphalia, he represents the CDU. Johannes Röring has served as a member of the Bundestag from the state of North Rhine-Westphalia since 2005.

== Life ==
He became member of the bundestag after the 2005 German federal election. He is a member of the Committee for Food and Agriculture.
