= Vreden =

- Town
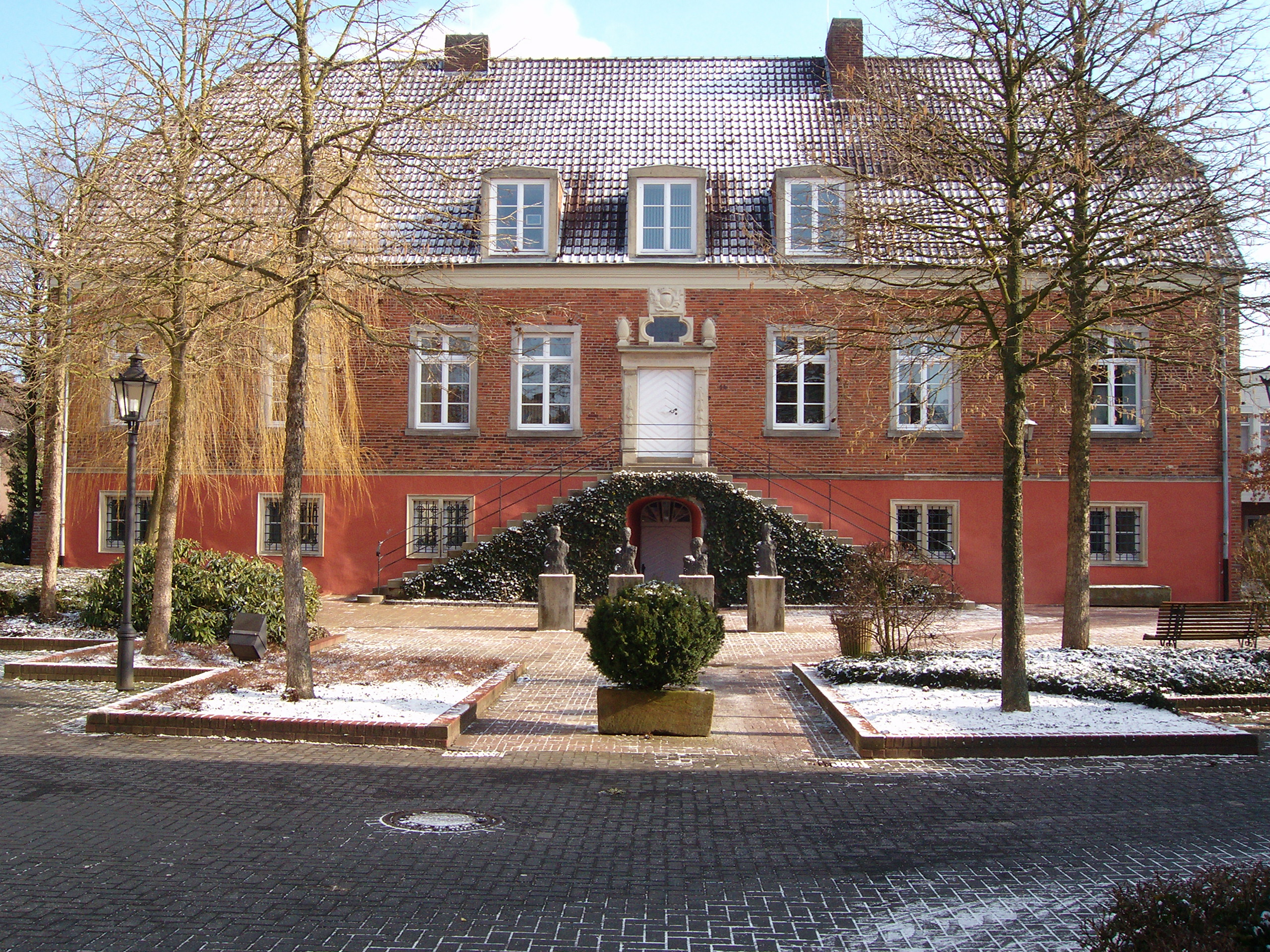
- Town hall

- Flag Coat of arms

- Location of Vreden within Borken district
- Interactive map of Vreden
- Location within Germany Location within North Rhine-Westphalia
- Coordinates: 52°02′N 06°50′E
- Country: Germany
- State: North Rhine-Westphalia
- Admin. region: Münster
- District: Borken

Government
  - Mayor (2020–25): Tom Tenostendarp (CDU)

Area
  - Total: 135.83 km^{2} (52.44 sq mi)
- Elevation: 27–57 m (89–187 ft)

Population (2025-12-31)
  - Total: 23,083
  - Density: 169.94/km^{2} (440.14/sq mi)
- Time zone: UTC+01:00 (CET)
  - Summer (DST): UTC+02:00 (CEST)
- Postal codes: 48691
- Dialling codes: 02564; 02567 (partially in Lünten)
- Vehicle registration: BOR
- Website: www.vreden.de

Vreden (German pronunciation: [ˈfʁeːdn̩]) is a small town in North Rhine-Westphalia, Germany near the Dutch border. The town is located near the river Berkel. The first mentioning of the town is proven for the year 839. In 1252 Vreden obtained city rights.

== Demographics ==
Historical population

Year	Pop.	±% p.a.
1965	15,948	—
1970	17,150	+1.46%
1975	17,797	+0.74%
1980	18,355	+0.62%
1985	18,618	+0.28%
1990	19,421	+0.85%
1995	20,745	+1.33%

Year	Pop.	±% p.a.
2000	21,718	+0.92%
2005	22,587	+0.79%
2010	22,551	−0.03%
2015	22,688	+0.12%
2020	22,676	−0.01%
2025	23,083	+0.36%

Source: Landesdatabank Nordrhein-Westfalen

=== Religion ===
- 90% Christian
- 10% other

== Culture and sights ==
=== Museums ===
- Hamaland-Museum
  - Farmer-Museum
- Silhouette Museum
- Miniature Shoe Museum
- Skulpturenpark Erning
- Heimathaus Noldes
- Berkelkraftwerk
- Biologische Station Zwillbrock

=== Buildings ===
- Former castle
- Old townhall
- Foundations of seven older churches under the current day St. Georg church
- Baroque church in Zwillbrock
- Stiftskirche (collegiate church of the former noble convent of Vreden)

=== Parks ===
- The "Zwillbrocker Venn": The Zwillbrocker Venn, approximately 10 km west of the city centre is part of a large nature reserve with numerous water areas. The Venn is home of Europe's largest black-headed gull breeding area and a small breeding colony of feral Chilean and greater flamingos.
- Vreden City Park: Includes the town's Farmer Museum.

=== Gallery ===
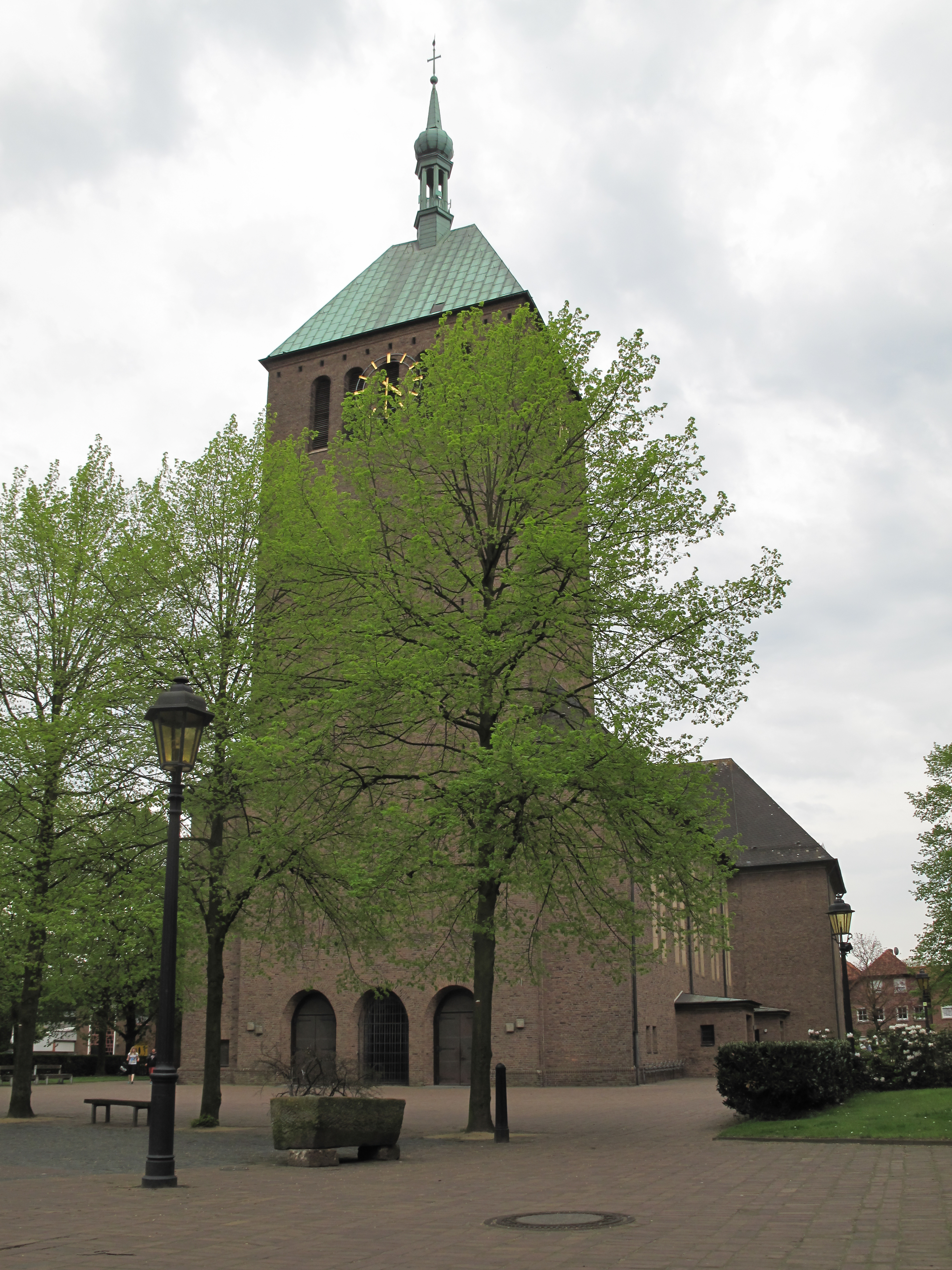
Vreden, church: die Pfarrkirche Sankt Georg

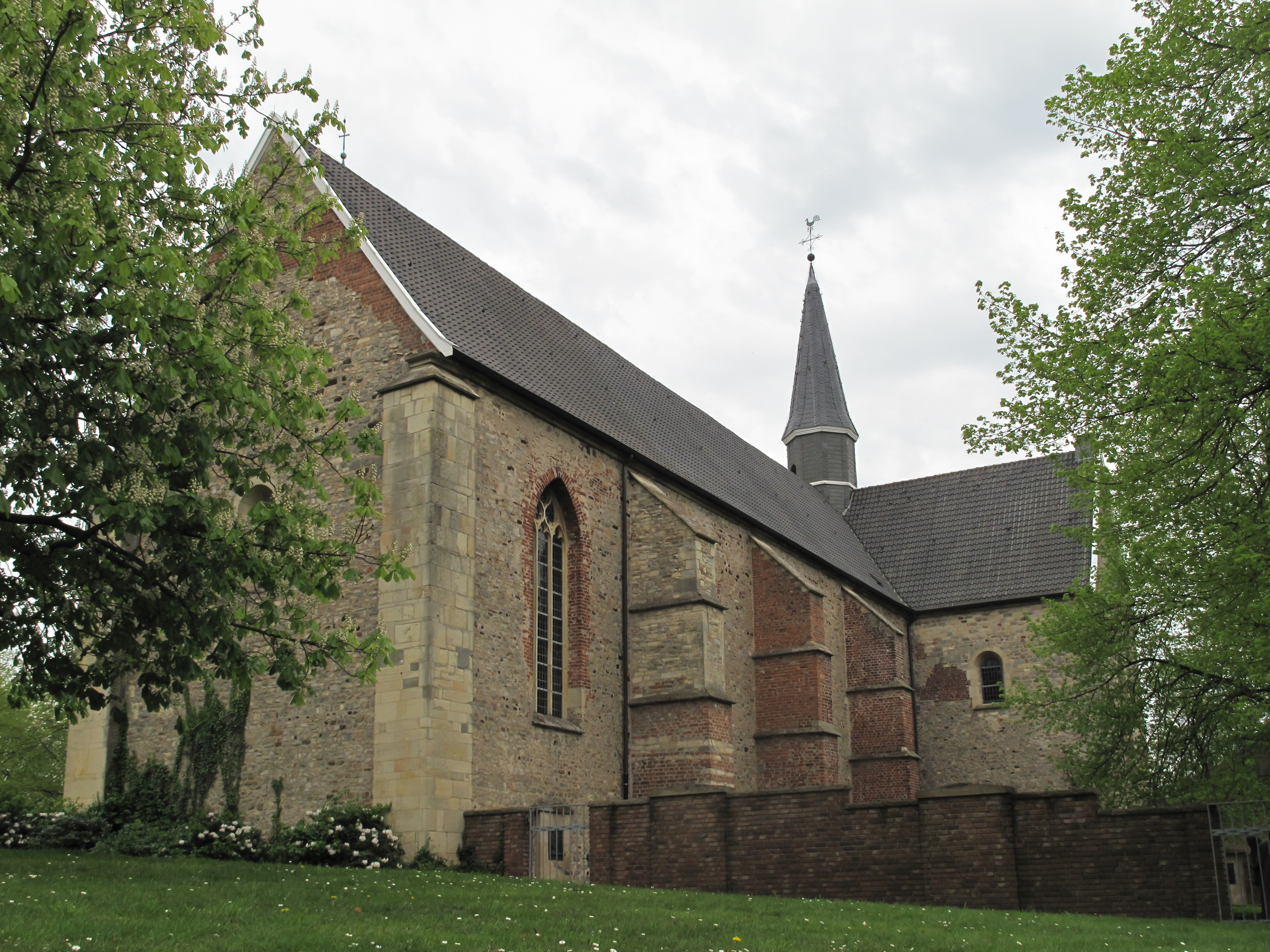
Vreden, church: die Stifftkirche Felicitas

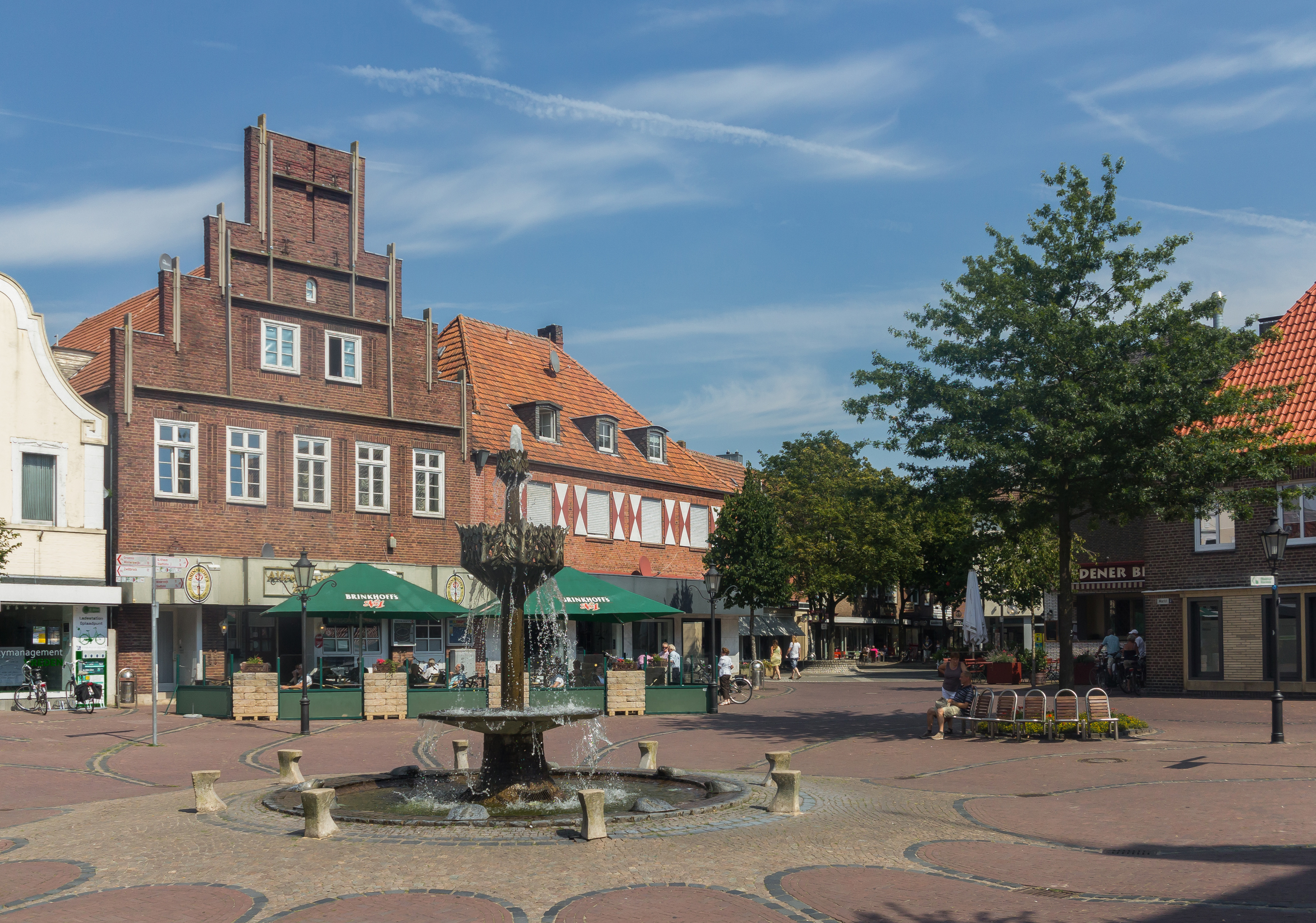
Vreden, view to the Markt

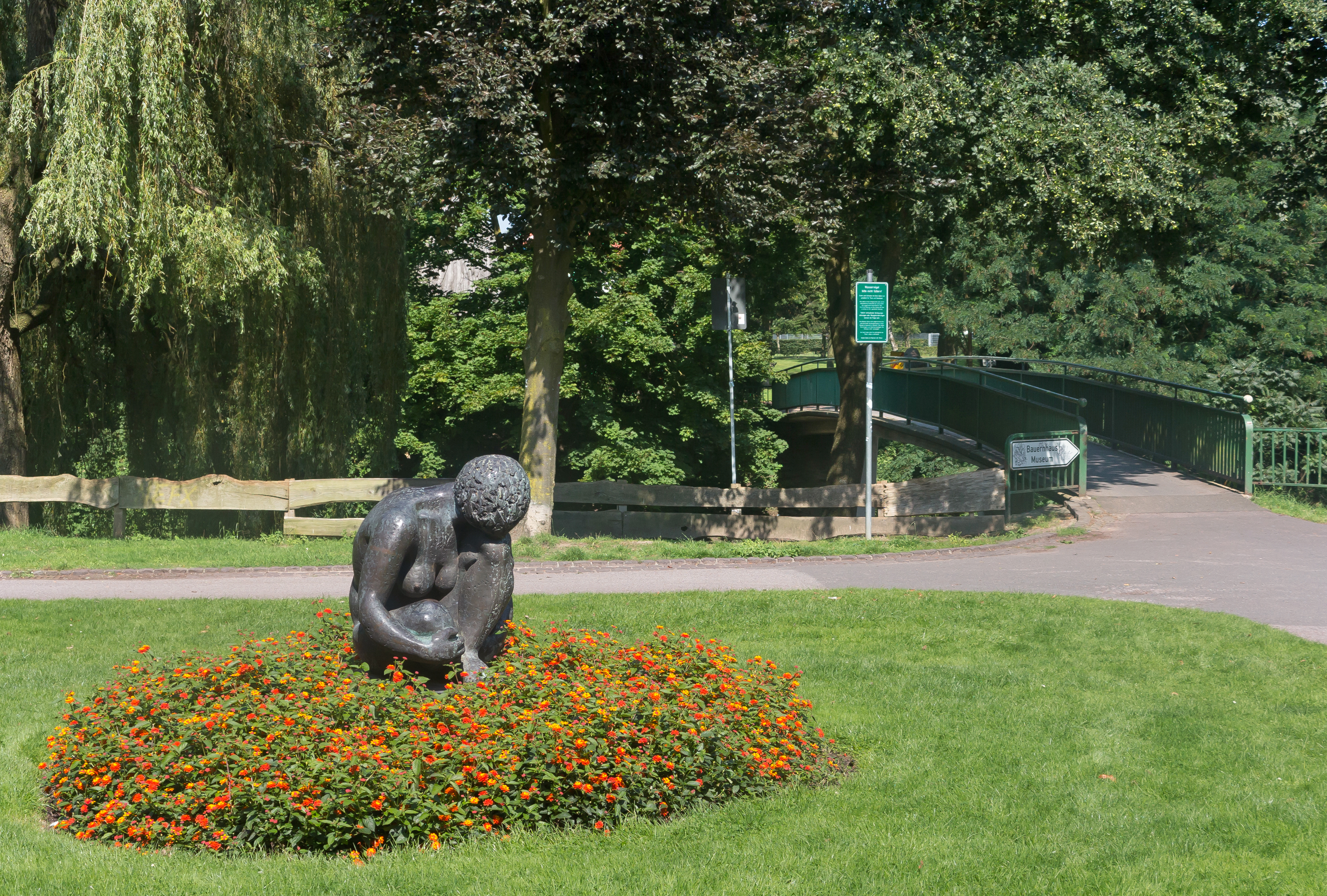
Vreden, sculpture near the Berkel

== Coat of arms ==
In the 13th century, Vreden was enlarged to a city by the archbishop of Cologne and the bishop of Münster, who were the city owners of that time. The Coat-of-Arms shows Petrus (patron of Cologne) and Paulus (patron of Münster) with a key and a sword behind the cross of Cologne and the bar of Münster.

== People from Vreden ==
- Johannes Röring (born 1959), German politician
- Stefan Decker, computer scientist
