= Stadtlohn =

- Town
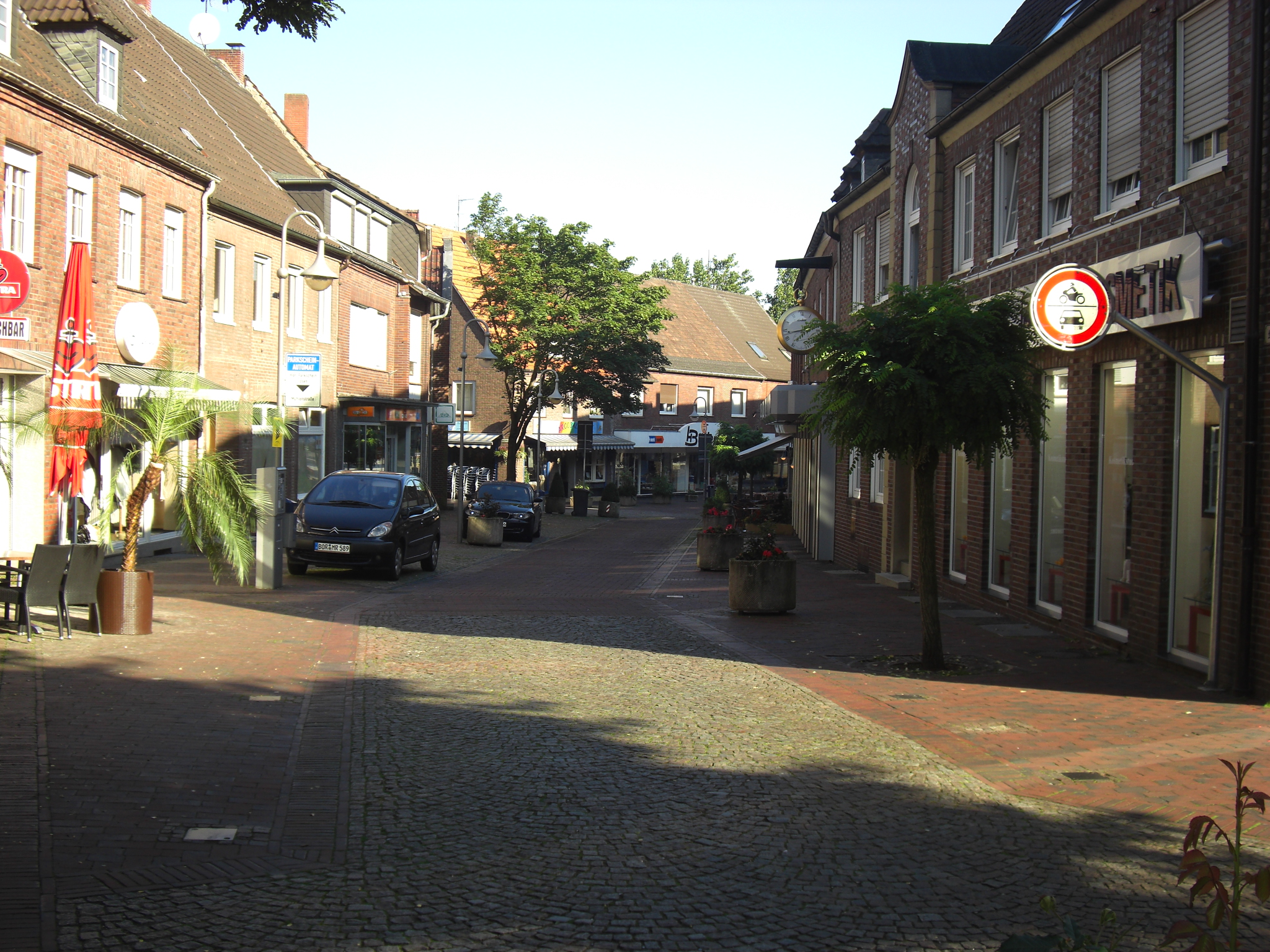

- Flag Coat of arms

- Location of Stadtlohn within Borken district
- Interactive map of Stadtlohn
- Location within Germany Location within North Rhine-Westphalia
- Coordinates: 51°59′33″N 06°54′54″E
- Country: Germany
- State: North Rhine-Westphalia
- District: Borken

Government
  - Mayor (2020–25): Berthold Dittmann (Ind.)

Area
  - Total: 79.25 km^{2} (30.60 sq mi)
- Elevation: 50 m (160 ft)

Population (2025-12-31)
  - Total: 20,856
  - Density: 263.2/km^{2} (681.6/sq mi)
- Time zone: UTC+01:00 (CET)
  - Summer (DST): UTC+02:00 (CEST)
- Postal codes: 48703
- Dialling codes: 0 25 63
- Vehicle registration: BOR
- Website: www.stadtlohn.de

Stadtlohn (German pronunciation: [ˈʃtatloːn]; Low German: Stadlaun) is a city in western Münsterland in the northwest of North Rhine-Westphalia, and is a district town of the Borken administrative district. The city had 20,856 inhabitants as of 2025. The River Berkel flows through the city on its way to the Netherlands.

== Geography ==
=== Division of the town ===
Stadtlohn consists of 9 districts:

- Stadtlohn
- Almsick
- Büren
- Estern
- Hengeler
- Hordt
- Hundewick
- Wendfeld
- Wenningfeld

== History ==
The town was founded as Lohn by Liudger, the first Bishop of Münster about the year 800. About 985 Gescher was split from Lohn, which in turn (1231) split into Südlohn (literally "South-Lohn") and Nordlohn (literally "North-Lohn"). The name Stadtlohn (literally "Town-Lohn") is first mentioned in 1389 after the small town Nordlohn was secured by a moat, a defensive wall and gates and gained the town rights. About 1406 Stadtlohn was burned down by Count Heinrich I of Solms-Ottenstein because he feuded with the bishop of Münster. Bishop Heinrich III of Münster verified its town rights in 1491.

In 1584 Stadtlohn was pillaged by the troops of Duke Ernest of Bavaria and again in 1588 by Dutch soldiers. In 1591 Spanish soldiers attacked the town. For a few months of 1598 Spanish troops were stationed in the town during the Eighty Years' War. In 1611 a serious fire destroyed 225 of 235 houses.

On August 6, 1623 during the Thirty Years' War the Battle of Stadtlohn (German: Schlacht im Lohner Brook) saw Johan Tzerclaes, Count of Tilly's imperial troops victorious over Duke Christian of Brunswick's men. About 6.000 soldiers died that day. In 1742 regular pilgrimages started to a statue of Mary in a small chapel in Stadtlohn from various towns in the Münsterland. The adoration of the Virgin Mary ended in 1886 when the statue was stolen from the Hilgenbergchapel.

In World War II, Stadtlohn was hit by bombs as early as 1940 and 1942, but the damage was limited. In March 1945, however, Stadtlohn was affected by two massive allied airstrikes that destroyed 86% of the town. About 600 inhabitants lost their lives. On March 31, 1945 British forces marched into the town.

== Population ==
Historical population

Year	Pop.	±% p.a.
1965	13,999	—
1970	15,470	+2.02%
1975	16,283	+1.03%
1980	16,722	+0.53%
1985	16,996	+0.33%
1990	17,713	+0.83%
1995	19,139	+1.56%

Year	Pop.	±% p.a.
2000	20,237	+1.12%
2005	20,692	+0.45%
2010	20,631	−0.06%
2015	20,411	−0.21%
2020	20,290	−0.12%
2025	20,856	+0.55%

Source: Landesdatabank Nordrhein-Westfalen

== Sights ==
- Former Jewish Cemetery in the town center. Close by there is a sightworthy commemorative plaque in Hagenstrasse street reminding on the synagogue which was destroyed in 1938.
- Former pilgrimage chapel Marienkapelle on Hilgenberg hill.
- Saint Otger Church, rebuilt after the war.
- Town Hall, destroyed in 1945 and rebuilt in 1953.
- Hünenburg
- Dicke Eiche

== Museums ==
- Railroadmuseum Stadtlohn
- SIKU Toy-car Museum

== Sports clubs ==
Stadtlohn has 2 sports clubs. The SUS Stadtlohn has the most members (approx. 3700 members), followed by the DJK Eintracht Stadtlohn.

== International relations ==
Stadtlohn is twinned with:

- Weerselo, Netherlands
- San Vito al Tagliamento, Italy
- Altlandsberg, Germany

== Notable people ==
- Ingrid Laubrock (born 1970), jazz musician
- Bernhard Rothmann (1495–after 1535), reformer and an Anabaptist leader
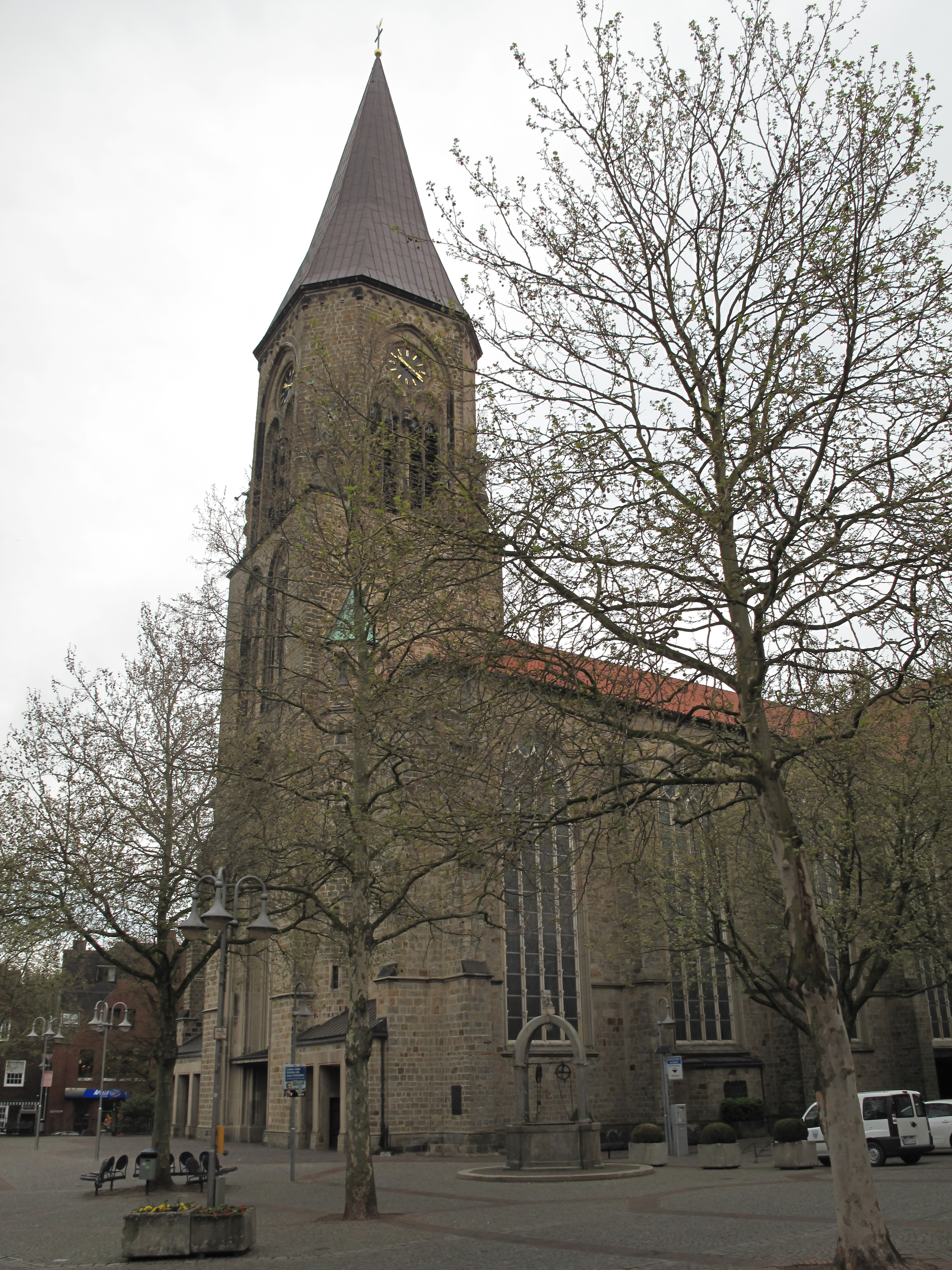
Church: Sankt Otger Kirche

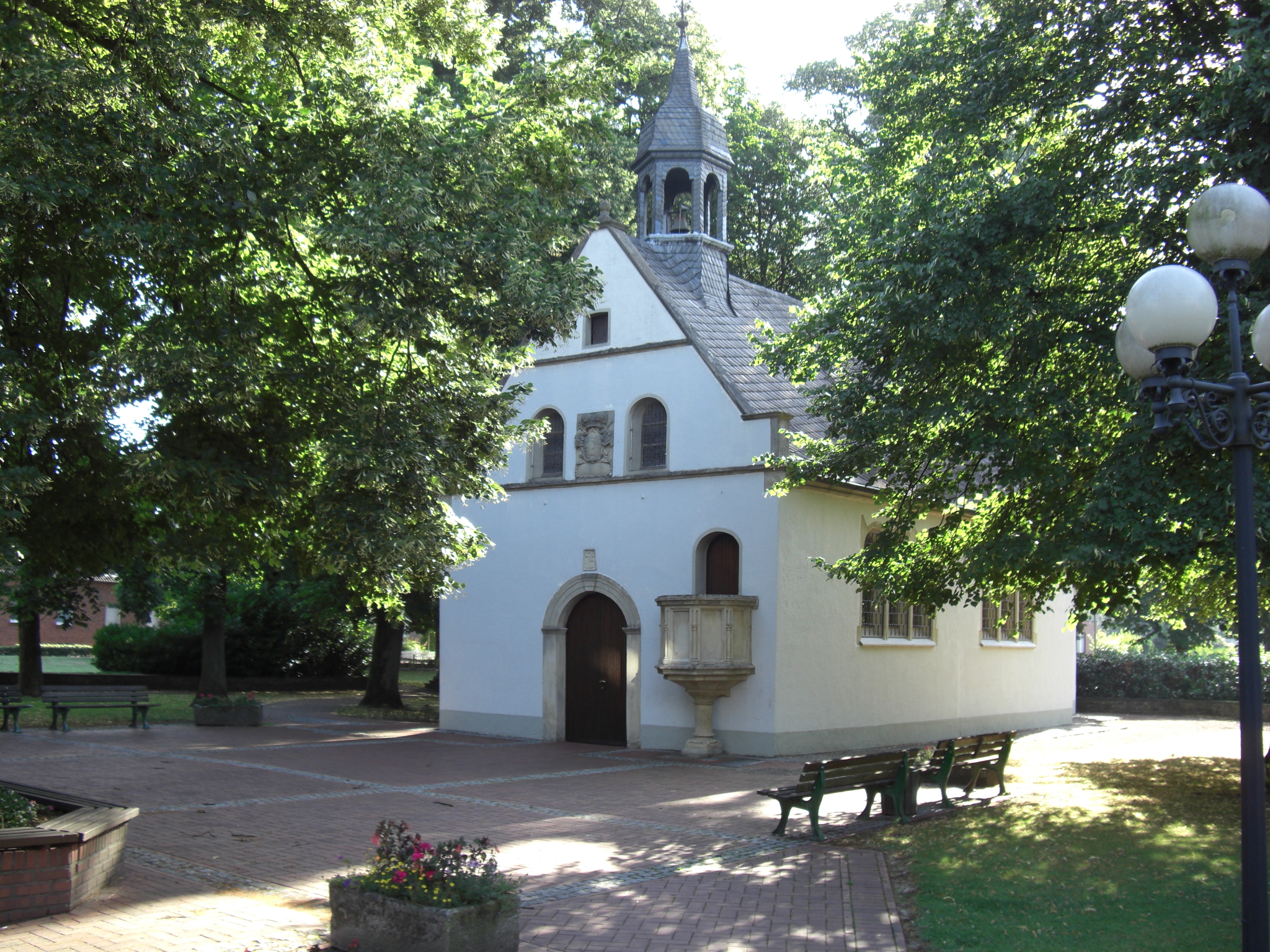
Former pilgrimage chapel Marienkapelle.

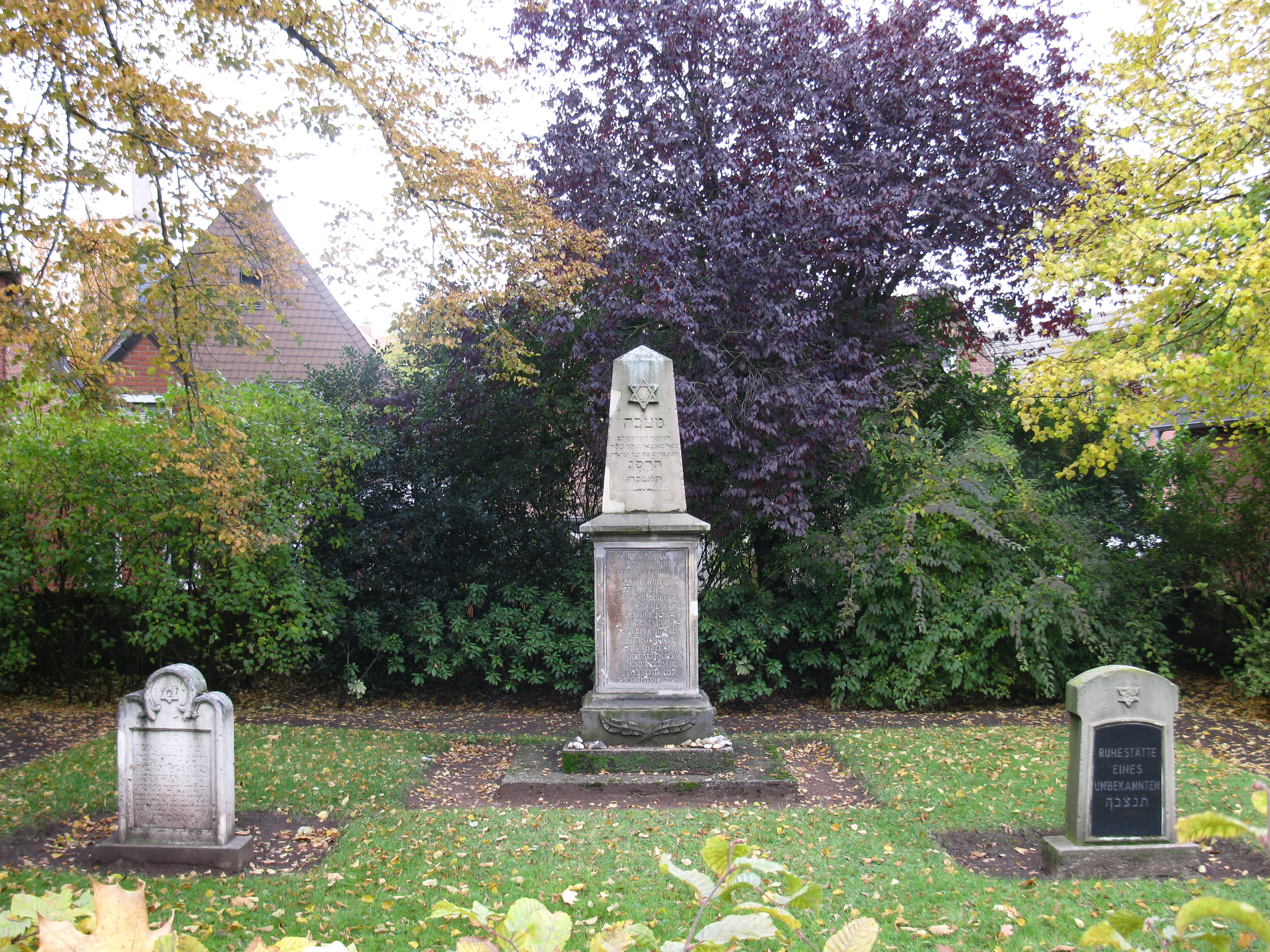
Former Jewish Cemetery.

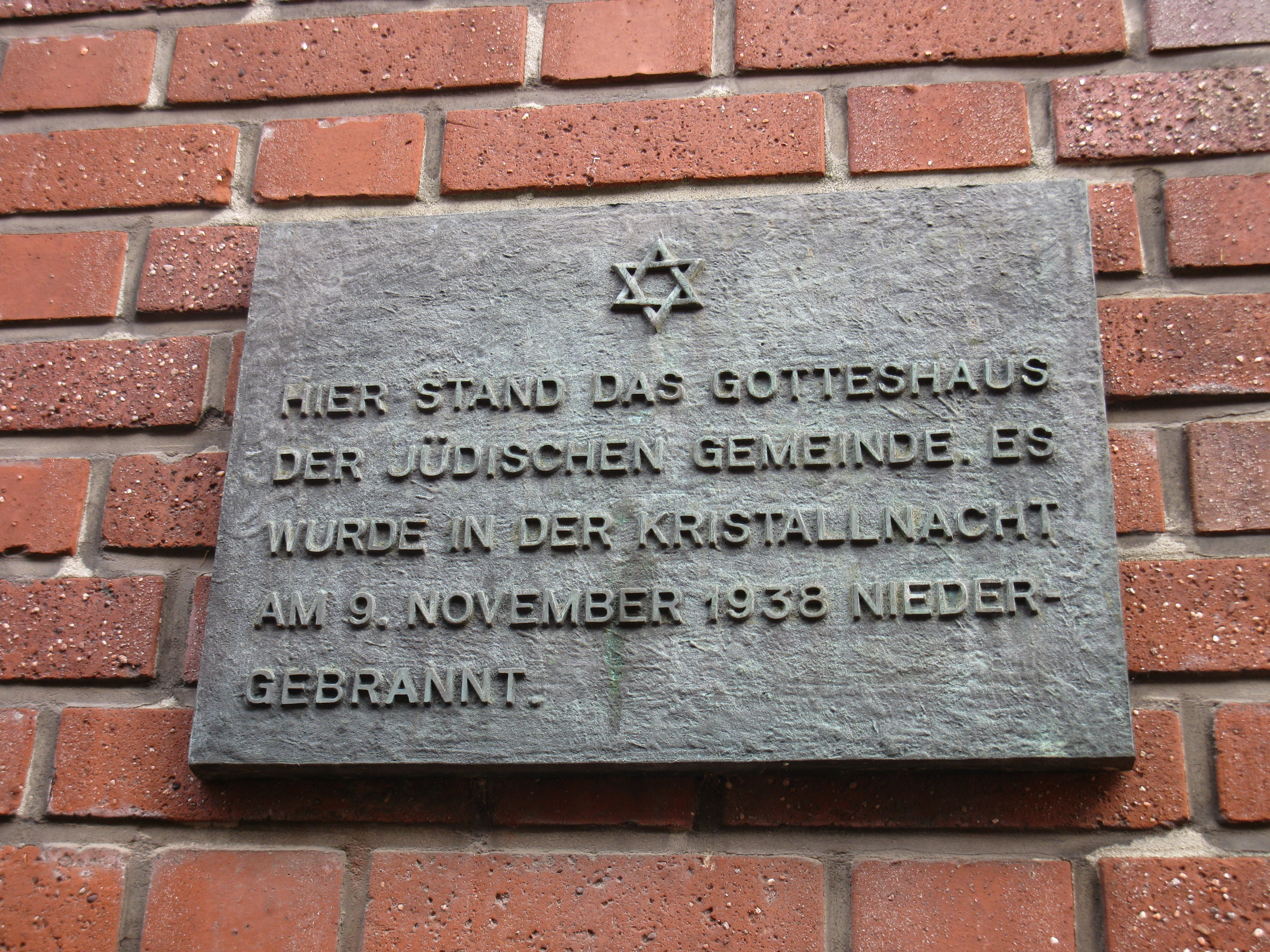
Commemorative plaque reminding on the synagogue.

Lohn family crest
