= Beckum Hills =

Hill range in Germany

- Location within North Rhine-Westphalia

Highest point
- Peak: Mackenberg
- Elevation: 174.4 m above NN

Dimensions
- Length: 14 km (8.7 mi)

Geography
- Country: Germany
- State: North Rhine-Westphalia
- Range coordinates: 51°45′12″N 8°09′02″E
- Parent range: Kernmünsterland

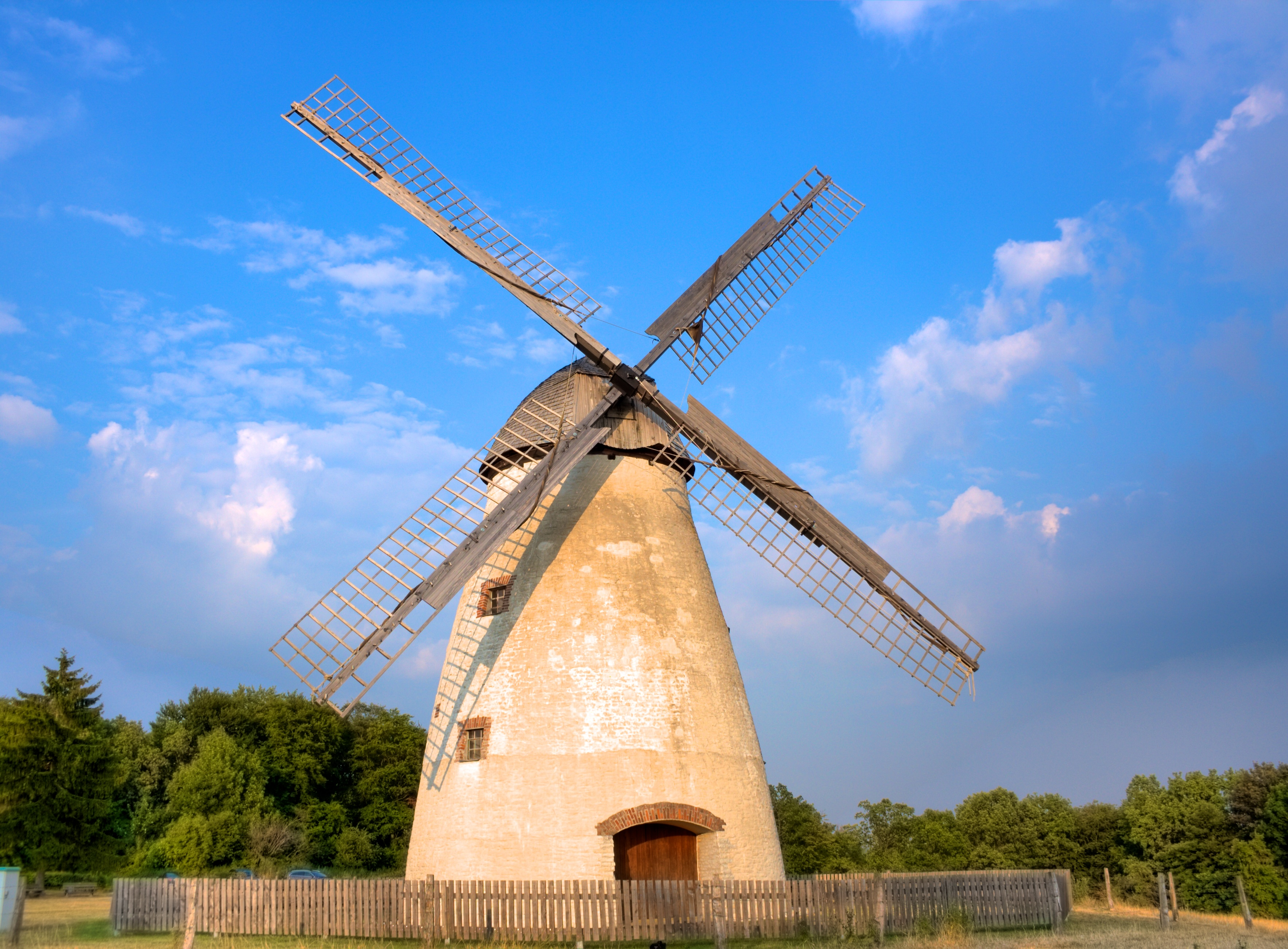
Windmill in the Beckum Hills

The Beckum Hills (German: Beckumer Berge), named after the town of Beckum, are a range of low hills, up to 174.4 m above sea level (NN), in the region of Münsterland in the German state of North Rhine-Westphalia (Germany). Along with the Baumberge and its foothills and the Haltern Hills they are among the few prominent elevations in the otherwise gently rolling Münsterland (which lies at 55 m above NN in the centre), the River Werse passes the ridge at 100 m to the east and the Lippe passing it at a height of 60 m near Hamm-Uentrop at some distance away from their highest point.

In terms of natural regions the Beckum Hills belong to the Kernmünsterland, being located in the southeast of that region.

== Location ==
The Beckum Hills lie in the southeastern part of Münsterland, mainly on the territory of the municipalities of Beckum (west), Wadersloh (southeast), Oelde (northeast) and Ennigerloh (northwest) - all in Warendorf district. Their extreme southwest lies in the municipality of Lippetal (Soest district).

The ridge is in the shape of a horseshoe, open towards the west, surrounding the town of Beckum which lies west of its centre. The northern heights are lower than those to the east and south. The hills frame the Kernmünsterland, lying southeast of its centre, falling gently towards the inside of the horseshoe, but dropping sharply to the surrounding plain on the outside.

== Natural region divisions ==
The Beckum Hills are divided as follows (the smaller subdivisions link to the villages after which they are named):

- (to 54 Westphalian Basin) (Westfälische Bucht)
  - (to 541 Kernmünsterland)
    - 541.3 Beckum Hills (Beckumer Berge)
      - 541.30 Dolberg Heights (Dolberger Höhen) - south
      - 541.31 Stromberg Plateau (Stromberger Platte) - east
      - 541.32 Oelde Riedelland (Oelder Riedelland) - northeast
      - 541.33 Beckum Basin (Beckumer Mulde) - west
      - 541.34 Ennigerloh Plateau (Ennigerloher Platte) - northwest

== Geology and mineral deposits ==
The Beckum Hills are a distinctive scarp landscape formed from Cretaceous marine deposits. From the centre of a basin near Beckum, which is open towards the west, the terrain ascends, especially to the south and east, but also to the north, initially gradually up to the highest elevations of the range. On the southern edge of the Beckum Basin the Höxberg Scarp (Höxbergstufe) rises to the hill of Höxberg (162.6 m) in the south and climbs up to the Mackenberg (174.4 m) in the east. On the far side of the ridge the land falls abruptly into the plain. Further out is the rather lower Stromberg Scarp (Strombergstufe) which falls just as steeply towards the outside and is named after the village of Stromberg northeast of Beckum. In the northeast of the Beckum Hills is the Dromberg Scarp (Drombergstufe), named after the Dromberg (< 100 m, east of Ennigerloh-Ostenfelde), which only rises around 20 m over the surrounding area.

The steep outward-facing escarpments are often covered by rough pasture, otherwise the natural climax vegetation alternates between beech woods and oak/hornbeam woods. Crops are grown here except on the slopes and in the hollows, mainly wheat and oats.

The main mineral deposit is limestone, which is quarried in Beckum and Ennigerloh in large quantities and used by the cement industry in the area. Formerly, strontianite was also mined and used as a whitener for the sugar industry.

== History ==
South of Beckum and roughly southeast of the Hermannsberg hill is the cultural monument of Germanenlager, site of a Germanic camp. North of the hill is another one on a Germanic burial site (Germanengräber).

== Streams ==
The Kollenbach, Lippbach and Siechenbach streams all rise in the Beckum Hills and unite as the Werse, which leaves the hills to the west before turning north and later flowing into the Ems. Streams flowing northwards (Axtbach) (north) or eastwards (e. g. the Fortbach, Linzelbach and Bergeler Bach) from the hills converge on the Ems, whilst those flowing south (Liese, Biesterbach, Bröggelbach) empty into the Lippe.

== Woods ==
The larger woods on the Beckum Hills are the Vellerner Brook, der Hohe Hagen near Neubeckum, the Bergeler Wald between Oelde and Stromberg and the woods on the Mackenberg and Diestedder Berg.

== High points ==
Amongst the high points on the Beckum Hills are (in order of height in metres (m) above sea level (NN):

- Mackenberg (174.4 m), west of Sünninghausen - Stromberg Plateau and eastern edge of the Beckum Basin
- Höxberg (162.6 m), south of Beckum, with an observation tower, the Soestwarte, to the south - Dolberg Heights and southern edge of the Beckum Basin
- Unnamed hill summit (154.6 m; with church), on the southern edge of Stromberg - Stromberg Plateau
- Unnamed hill summit (147.9 m), in Keitlinghausen (south of Oelde) - Stromberg Plateau
- Unnamed hill summit (146.0 m), northwest of Stromberg - Stromberg Plateau
- Unnamed hill summit (143.9 m), northeast Sünninghausen - Stromberg Plateau
- Diestedder Berg (139.8 m), northwest of Diestedde - Stromberg Plateau
- Önkhausberg (136.4 m), southeast of Dünninghausen - in the south of the Stromberg Plateau
- Fackenberg (129.0 m), between Beckum and Lippborg - Dolberg Heights
- Hermannsberg (128.2 m), south of Beckum, with the cultural monuments of ‘’Germanenlager’’ and ‘’Germanengräber’’ - Dolberg Heights
- Brunsberg (125.7 m), southwest of Beckum - Dolberg Heights
- Dalmer Berg (122.3 m), south of Beckum - Dolberg Heights
