= Siechenbach =

Siechenbach may refer to:

- Siechenbach (Brenz), a river of Baden-Württemberg, Germany, tributary of the Brenz
- Siechenbach (Kollenbach), a river in Beckum, North Rhine-Westphalia, Germany, tributary of the Kollenbach
- Siechenbach (Wunsiedel), a river of Bavaria, Germany, tributary of the Röslau near Wunsiedel
