= Westerberg (Baumberge) =

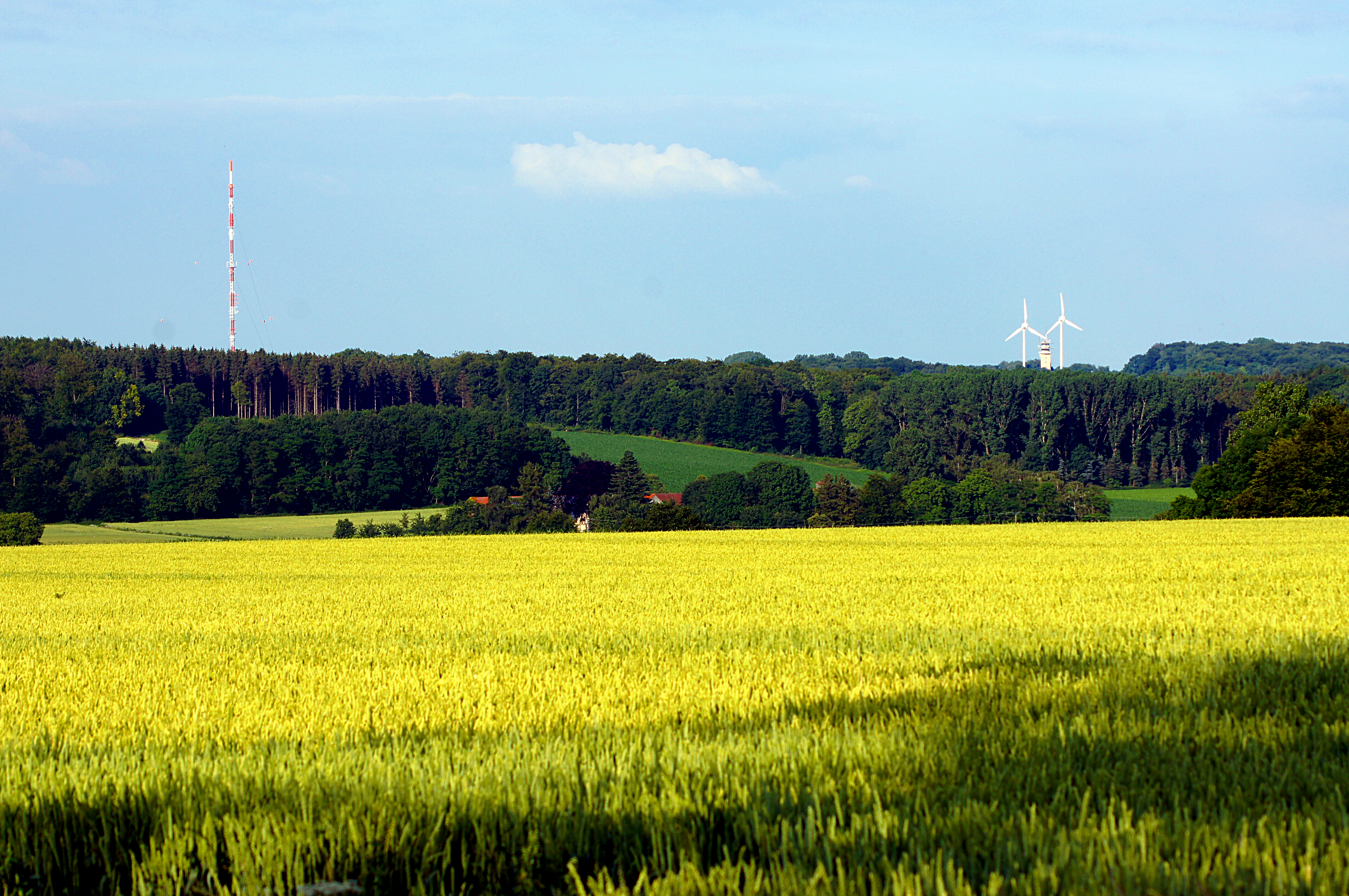
- View of the Westerberg and Longinus Tower (right, between the wind generators)

Highest point
- Elevation: 187.6 m above sea level (NN) (615 ft)
- Coordinates: 51°57′37″N 7°21′54″E

Geography
- Location within North Rhine-Westphalia
- Location: North Rhine-Westphalia, Germany
- Parent range: Baumberge

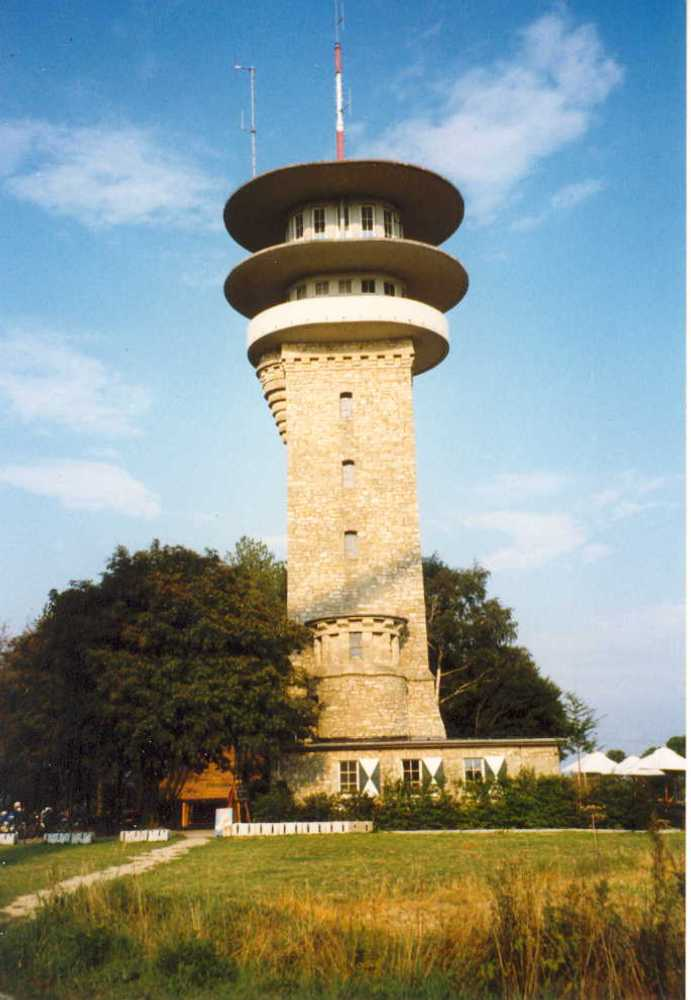
The Longinus Tower

The Westerberg, also called the Westerather Berg, is, at 187.6 m above sea level (NN), the highest elevation in the Baumberge hills and the German region of Münsterland. It is located in this small range of hills between the three villages of Billerbeck, Havixbeck, and Nottuln.

== Longinus Tower ==
On the summit of the Westerberg, which is in places only sparsely wooded, stands the Longinus Tower (Longinusturm), an observation tower about 30 m high that was built by the Baumberge Society between 1897 and 1901. It is made of Baumberge Lime Sandstone.

== Views ==
The Longinus Tower, which can usually be climbed all year round, dominates the Baumberge and is its chief attraction. From its observation deck, which requires a head for heights, there is often a good, panoramic view over the Baumberge and the countryside surrounding this hill country in western Münsterland. From here visitors can see the Teutoburg Forest (to the northeast), the aforementioned villages, the Emsland (to the north), the Westphalian Basin (to the east), the Sauerland (to the southeast), the Ruhrgebiet (to the south), the Bergen hills and even the Netherlands (to the west).

The tower, which can be accessed by road from the surrounding villages, is a good start and end point for walks, short or long, for example into the valley of the Stever. On clear days, hundreds of walkers, cyclists, motorcyclists and car drivers gather, not only to stop at the cafe, but also to enjoy the views.

== Baumbergschnecke ==
The Café Longinus by the tower describes itself as "the highest cafe in the Münsterland". From here there are tours on an observation bus, the Baumbergschnecke ("Baumberge Snail") that crawls through the wooded countryside at 6 km/h. It is a veteran bus that has been converted and extended into a sightseeing bus.

== Local places of interest ==
- Hülshoff Castle (Burg Hülshoff)
- Baumberge Sandstone Museum (Baumberger Sandsteinmuseum)
- Holtwicker Ei
- Varlar Castle (Schloss Varlar)
- Darfeld Water Castle (Wasserschloss Darfeld)
- the historic village centre of Nottuln
