= Haltern Hills =

Coordinates: 51°44′35″N 7°11′14″E

The Haltern Hills (German: Halterner Berge) comprise the three ridges of Hohe Mark (146 m), Borkenberge (133 m) and Haard (154 m) located respectively northwest, east and south of the German town of Haltern am See in Westphalia. They are the only submontane subunit in the major natural region of Westmünsterland, and are found in the southeast of the region. Immediately to the east is the southwestern part of the Kernmünsterland, also part of the Westphalian Lowland.

They are separated by the valleys of the rivers Lippe (northern boundary of the Haard with the other two ridges) and a line from the Halterner Mühlenbach via the Halterner Stausee and Stever river to its confluence (eastern boundary of the Hoher Mark with the Borkenbergen).

The Haltern Hills, including the valleys that separate them, have an area of 283 km^{2} in the southeast of the Hohe Mark Nature Park.
