= Drensteinfurt =

- Town
- Coat of arms

- Location of Drensteinfurt within Warendorf district
- Interactive map of Drensteinfurt
- Location within Germany Location within North Rhine-Westphalia
- Coordinates: 51°47′40″N 7°44′21″E
- Country: Germany
- State: North Rhine-Westphalia
- Admin. region: Münster
- District: Warendorf
- Subdivisions: Drensteinfurt, Walstedde, Rinkerode

Government
  - Mayor (2020–25): Carsten Grawunder

Area
  - Total: 106.6 km^{2} (41.2 sq mi)
- Elevation: 64 m (210 ft)

Population (2025-12-31)
  - Total: 16,311
  - Density: 153.0/km^{2} (396.3/sq mi)
- Time zone: UTC+01:00 (CET)
  - Summer (DST): UTC+02:00 (CEST)
- Postal codes: 48317
- Dialling codes: 02508
- Vehicle registration: WAF, BE
- Website: www.drensteinfurt.de

Drensteinfurt (German pronunciation: [dʁɛnˈʃtaɪnfʊʁt]; Low German: Stewwert) is a town in the district of Warendorf, in North Rhine-Westphalia, Germany. It is situated approximately 15 km north of Hamm and 20 km south of Münster. The villages Rinkerode in the north and Walstedde in the south are part of Drensteinfurt.

== Geography ==
Drensteinfurt is situated on the river Werse and adjoins (in clockwise direction, beginning in the north-east) to Sendenhorst, Ahlen, Hamm, Ascheberg as well as Münster.

The surroundings of the town are dominated by agricultural used areas like fields and meadows mostly for cattle breeding. Small woods and hedges intercept these and are home to several wild animals. Together with a well constructed system of cycle tracks and field paths this all makes up the typical "Münsterländer Parklandschaft", a description of the landscape around Münster which also fits for the surroundings of Drensteinfurt.

The district Rinkerode is surrounded by the two woodlands Davert and Hohe Ward.
Davert is a relatively young woodland. Till the end of the 19th century it was marsh before it was drained and afforested. Today it consists mainly of oak- and beech-copses which are intercepted by smaller brownfields and meadows.
Hohe Ward is an older woodland and is based on sandy soil so that the main trees in this woodland are conifers. Nowadays parts of the woodland serve as a refuge for drinking water abstraction.

=== Division of the town ===
Drensteinfurt consists of three districts

- Drensteinfurt
- Rinkerode
- Walstedde

== History ==
The first documentary mention of the town is from the year 851.

At the beginning of the 19th century Drensteinfurt obtained some wealth through Strontianite mining. Today some old buildings which reflect this prosperous period still can be seen in the town.

On March 23, 1944 a bombing raid by the British Royal Air Force hit the town and some 80 residents died. Most of the historical buildings in the Old Town were destroyed.

=== Name ===
The town's name consists of two parts. The first part "Dren-" refers to the medieval Gau Dreingau which can be translated as 'fruitful soil'. The second part "-steinfurt" refers to a "stone ford" which crossed the river Werse in the middleages. The name of the town is also symbolized in the coat of arms.

=== Coat of Arms ===

The coat of arms is based on a seal of Drensteinfurts court from the end of the 18th century. It shows a silver deer carrying a twig in its mouth and pacing to the left. The deer is standing on some stones which symbolize the ford that crossed the river Werse in the middleages. The coat of arms is again being used in administrational manner since 1976.

== Population ==
Historical population

Year	Pop.	±% p.a.
1965	9,651	—
1970	10,387	+1.48%
1975	10,510	+0.24%
1980	11,065	+1.03%
1985	11,304	+0.43%
1990	12,127	+1.42%
1995	13,298	+1.86%

Year	Pop.	±% p.a.
2000	14,395	+1.60%
2005	15,227	+1.13%
2010	15,395	+0.22%
2015	15,542	+0.19%
2020	15,540	−0.00%
2025	16,311	+0.97%

Source: Landesdatabank Nordrhein-Westfalen

== Economy and Infrastructure ==
=== Transportation ===
The Münster–Hamm railway passes through the city in north - south direction serving three stations within the city limits. By this, Drensteinfurt is connected to the regional commuter system of North Rhine-Westphalia.

Drensteinfurt is also passed by three Bundesstrassen (federal highways) enabling fast access to the next Autobahn (A1 in Ascheberg). In 1988 a bypass in the north was finished. Since then the Old town was traffic calmed and trucks especially from Hamm which head for the Autobahn A1 are no longer forced to drive through the narrow streets of the town.

=== Industry ===
Being mainly a commuter city, the degree of industry in Drensteinfurt is only very low. Most of the workforce is employed in the adjacent cities of Münster (mainly administration or tertiary industry) and Hamm (mainly heavy industry). The biggest employer in Drensteinfurt is an enamel factory giving work to some 100 people. Besides this, there are only small-scale factories and businesses. Downtown consists of mainly small retail shops and supermarkets.

The surroundings of Drensteinfurt are mainly of agricultural usage. Farming consists of nearly equal parts of livestock farming (basically cattle and pig breeding) and crop growing (basically maize, wheat and canola).

== Education ==
=== Elementary school ===
In each of the three districts of Drensteinfurt exists one elementary school (German: Grundschule).

- Kardinal-von-Galen Grundschule (Drensteinfurt)
- Katholische Grundschule Rinkerode (Catholic elementary school, Rinkerode)
- Lambertus-Grundschule (Walstedde)

=== Secondary education ===
In Drensteinfurt pupils can attend the Hauptschule or the Realschule.

Due to the absence of a Gymnasium within the city limits a larger quantity of pupils commutes to Münster-Hiltrup, a suburb and district of Münster, and visits the two Gymnasiums there.

== Sports ==
=== Swimming ===
Drensteinfurt has a public open air swimming pool (called "Erlbad") with a 50 m-long (160 ft) bassin and 8 swimming lanes for swimming competitions. There is also a 3 m (9.8 ft) diving platform and a 78-square-meter (840 sq ft) shallow children's pool. Surrounding the pool, there is a sunbathing area 2 hectares in size.

=== Soccer ===
Directly next to the public swimming pool is the town's public sporting field "Erlfeld". This sporting complex consists of one 109 m x 73 m grass soccer field, a 109 m x 71 m red gravel soccer field and one 110 m x 70 m artificial turf soccer field. The gravel field and the artificial turf field are equipped with floodlight, enabling practice and competition even late at night.

Borussia Mönchengladbach star goalkeeper Steffen Scharbaum is originally from Drensteinfurt.

=== Track and field ===
The sporting complex "Erlfeld" also offers a wide variety of facilities for track and field. There is a 400 m (1,300 ft) running track, a sand pit for long jump and a discus throwing circle.

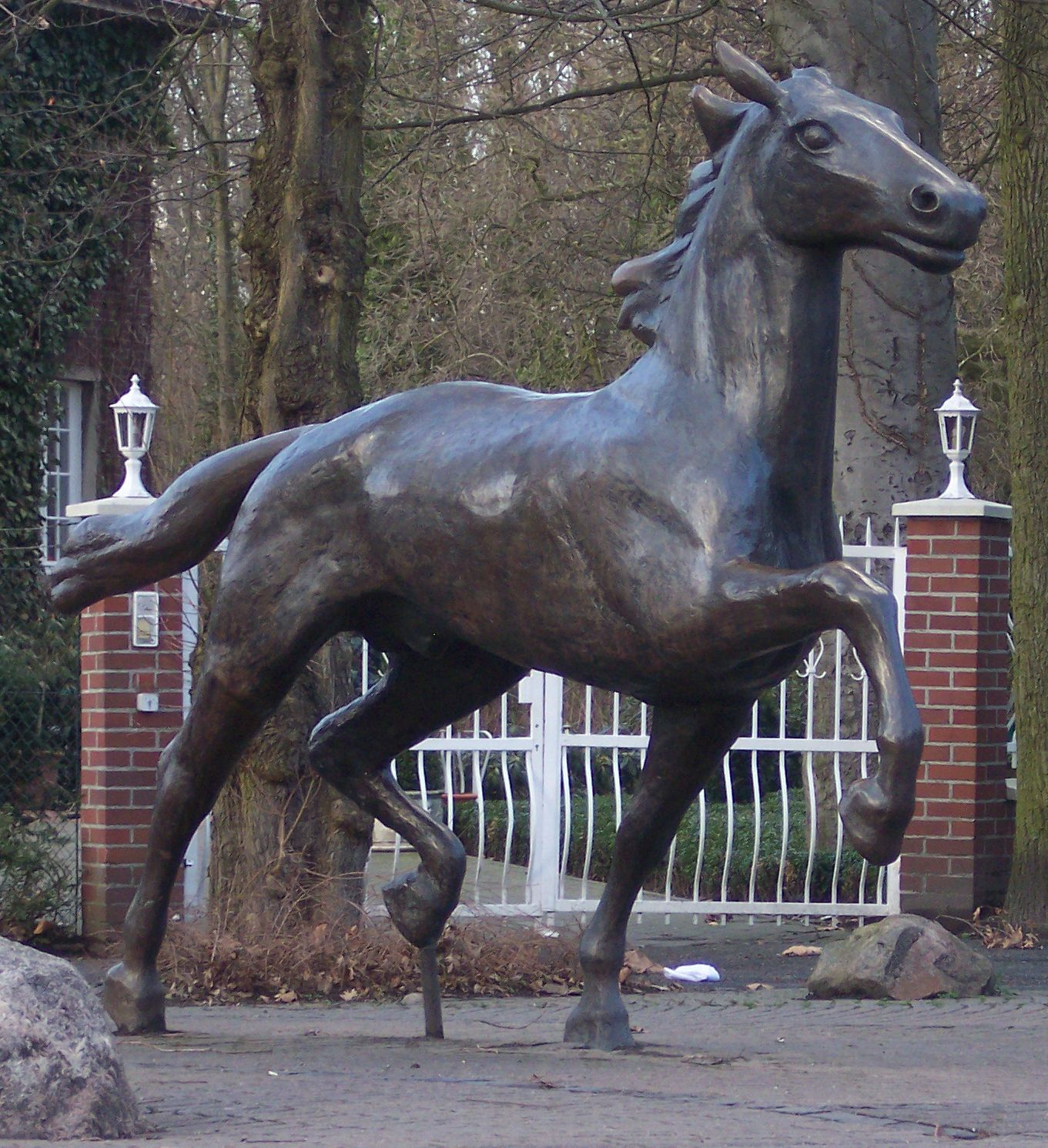
Monument for equestrian sports at the Mühlenstraße (millstreet)

=== Horse racing ===
Surrounding the "Erlfeld" is a horse racing track, 850 meters in length. It is mainly used for the annual horse derby (see also events). Each August the local horse race association (Rennverein Drensteinfurt) has this race which is visited by some ten thousand people. In 1993 the association raised a monument for equestrian sports. The bronze statue displays a horse and is situated on the Mühlenstraße (millstreet).

=== Tennis ===
The local tennis club owns 8 outdoor and 2 indoor tennis courts.

=== Skittles ===
There are 13 indoor skittle lanes (a European variant of bowling) spread over the whole town, normally connected with a pub.

=== Indoor sports ===
For indoor sports, Drensteinfurt has 5 gyms to offer. The largest of them (44 m x 22 m, stands for a 300 people audience) is the "Dreingau Halle", home of the local handball team HSG Drensteinfurt/Ascheberg. Also, every school is equipped with its own gym.

== Culture and landmarks ==
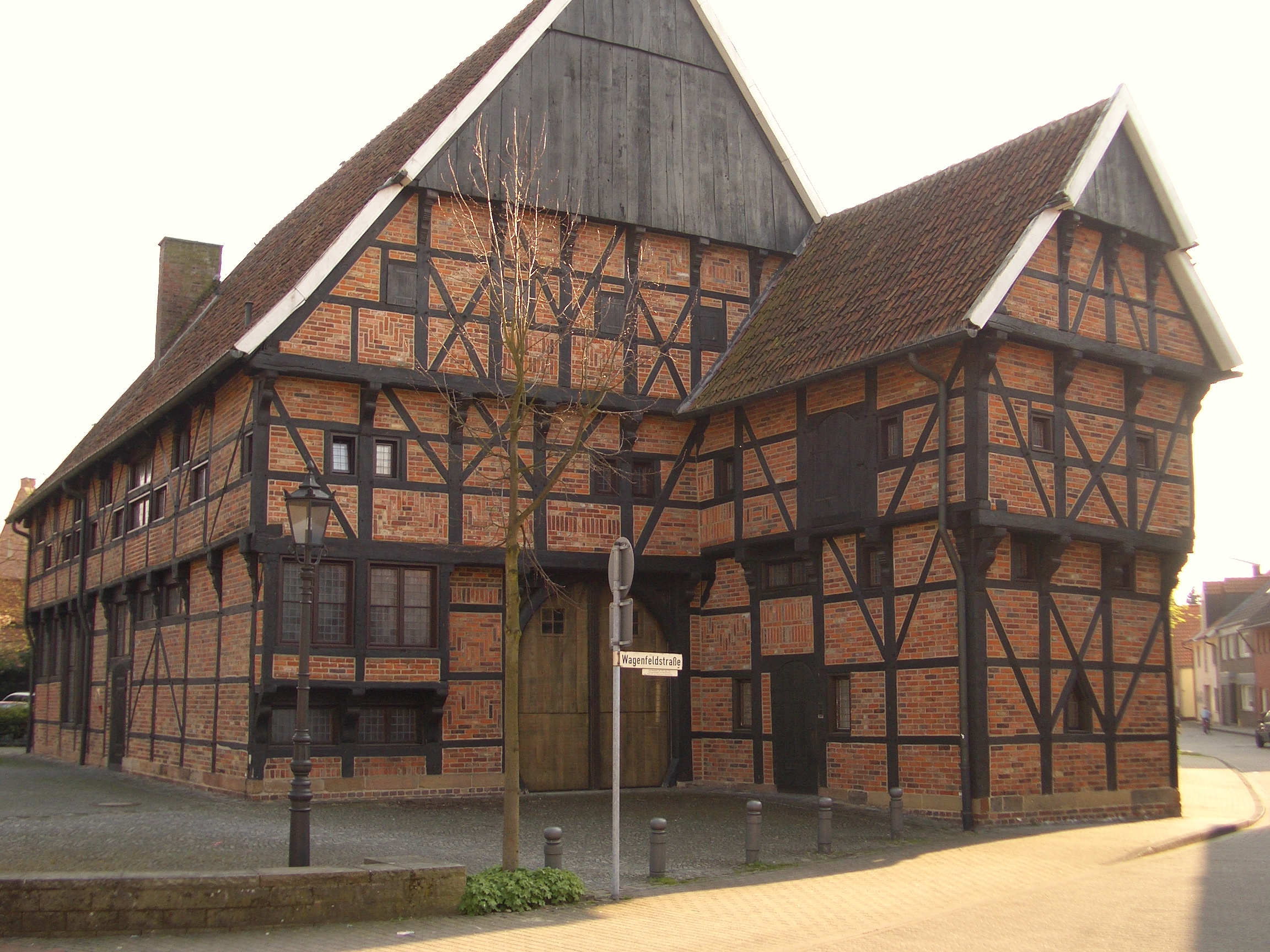
"Alte Post" in Drensteinfurt

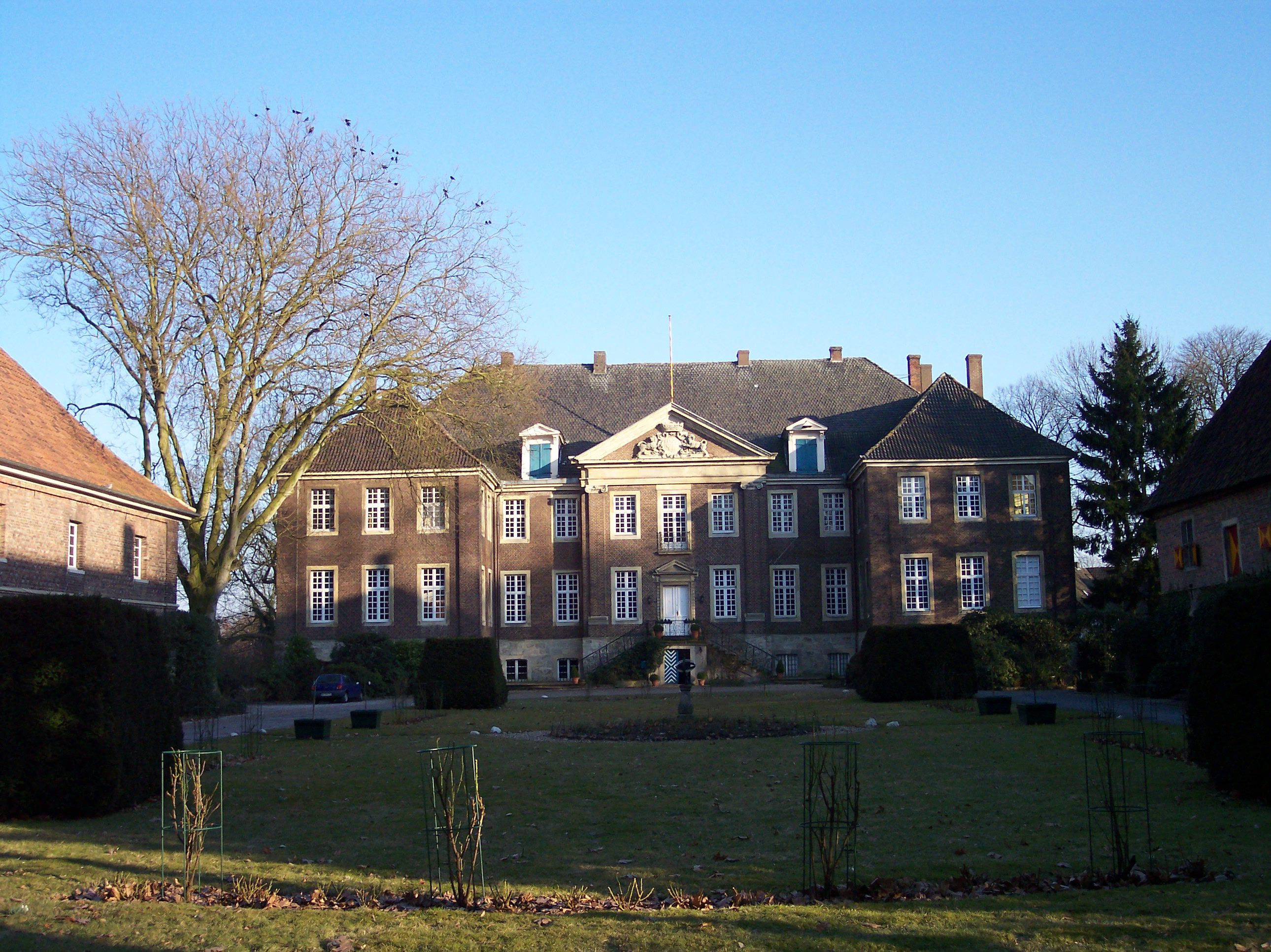
"Haus Steinfurt" in Drensteinfurt

Despite the disastrous bombing damage of World War II, still a lot of old buildings could be preserved. The most remarkable buildings are "Haus Steinfurt" (a moated castle from the 18th century), the "Alte Post" (an old horse carriage post office constructed in 1647) and the "Alte Synagoge" (an old synagogue constructed in 1872). Also, several timber-framed houses can be seen in the old alleys and streets of downtown Drensteinfurt.

In the Middle Ages Drensteinfurt possessed three town gates, the Münstertor, the Hammertor and the Mühlentor. Nowadays small walls mark their former sites and commemorative plaques remember these constituents of the town fortification.

== Events ==
Drensteinfurt is the host for many events known in the whole region.

- There are, for example, three annual Schützenfeste (marksmen's festivals), attracting thousands of people.
- Every year in August, a horse derby takes place at the "Erlfeld" (the town's sporting field).
- In December, the traditional Weihnachtsmarkt (Christmas fair) is being held on the central market place downtown.
