= Diestedde =

- Interactive map of Diestedde
- Coordinates: 51°44′10″N 8°10′22″E
- Country: Germany
- State: Nordrhein-Westfalen
- District: Warendorf

Population (31 Dec 2016)
  - Total: 2,463

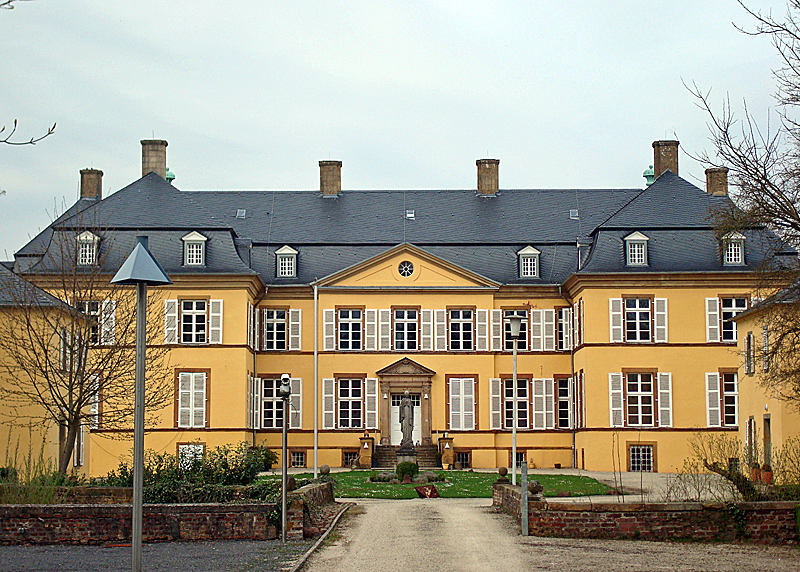
Palace Crassenstein

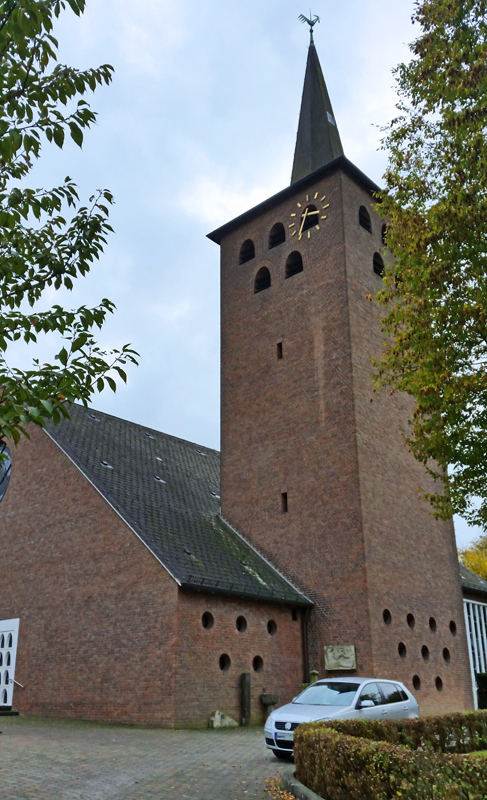
St.-Nikolaus-Church

Diestedde is a village in the municipality Wadersloh and is part of the district Warendorf. The peasantries Altendiestedde, Düllo, Entrup and Geist belong to the greater area of Diestedde.

== Geography ==
Diestedde is located approximately 10 km east of Beckum and 20 km north-east of Lippstadt. The mean elevation above sea level is between 100 and 105 m. The highest point of the district Wadersloh with 139 m above sea level is also located in Diestedde.
