= Kernmünsterland =

Landscape unit in western Germany

The Kernmünsterland is a major landscape unit in western Germany. It covers an area of about 2700 km^{2} and lies at the heart of the Westphalian Basin and the historic region of Münsterland in the north of Westphalia. It is bounded to the west, north and east by the sandy countryside of the Westmünsterland and Ostmünsterland, whilst in the south it is bordered by the loess landscapes of the Hellweg Börde and Emscherland. Geologically it rises clearly over the surrounding area on a bed of thinly covered Upper Cretaceous strata.

The Kernmünsterland is roughly bounded by the valley of the River Lippe to the south and that of the Ems to the northeast, the Lippe valley being considered part of Kernmünsterland, whilst the Ems valley is counted as part of Ostmünsterland. To the west it is bordered by the hills of the Baumberge (up to 188 m) and the Schöppingen Ridge (up to 158 m) to the northwest and the Haltern Hills (up to 154 m - Hohe Mark, Borkenberge and Haard) to the southwest, the Baumberge and Schöppingen Ridge being included in Kernmünsterland, whilst the Haltern Hills are part of Westmünsterland. Another ridge, the Beckum Hills (up to 174 m) to the southeast is its own major landscape unit.

== Location ==
Kernmünsterland includes the city of Münster (less the northeast part) to the north, the district of Coesfeld (less the extreme west with Coesfeld and Billerbeck) to the west, the district of Warendorf (less the north with Sassenberg, Warendorf-Nord, Telgte and Ostbevern) to the east the centre of the historic Münsterland.
