= Mord auf Ex =

- Genre: True crime
- Format: Podcast
- Country of origin: Germany
- Language: German

Cast and voices
- Hosted by: Leonie Bartsch, Linn Schütze

Production
- Production: Auf Ex Productions

Publication
- No. of episodes: 300+
- Original release: 11 November 2019
- Updates: Weekly

Related
- Related shows: True Love, Die Nachbarn, " Die Jägerin"
- Website: https://mordaufex.podigee.io/

Mord auf Ex is a German true crime podcast created by hosts and journalists Linn Schütze and Leonie Bartsch. Since its launch on 11 November 2019, a new episode has been published every Monday. The podcast deals with real-life crimes from all around the world.

== Hosts ==
=== Leonie Bartsch ===
Leonie Bartsch (born 1994 in Liesborn) grew up in Münsterland. After she finished her Abitur at Gymnasium Johanneum in Wadersloh, she studied economic policy and business administration at the universities of Münster and Madrid. Afterwards, she studied literary studies and philosophy in Berlin. As a freelance journalist, she wrote articles for Die Zeit and Die Welt. During an editorial traineeship at ProSiebenSat.1 Media, she met Linn Schütze.

=== Linn Schütze ===
Linn Schütze (born 1996 in Hamburg) studied communication science and history at the University of Erfurt. Afterwards, she worked for the production company Maz & More TV Produktion in Berlin. She then did an editorial traineeship at ProSiebenSat.1 Media.

== History ==
Bartsch and Schütze developed the concept for the podcast independently while completing their traineeships. After ProSieben's podcast department declined to pick up the concept, they independently published the initial episodes on various platforms. Following a subsequent increase in listenership and independent marketing efforts, ProSieben later approached the creators to partner with the show.

In 2020, Bartsch and Schütze founded the production company Auf EX Productions.

In 2023, the 200th episode of the podcast, "Böses Blut im Ballett" (Bad Blood in the Ballet) was performed in front of a live audience, together with the Kiel Philharmonic Orchestra.

Since 2019, Seven.One Entertainment Group, a subsidiary of ProSiebenSat.1 Media, has been promoting the podcast with virtual live events, an exclusive series on the platform FYEO and a merchandising campaign.

From 2020 to 2022 the podcast was a part of the 1LIVE podcast festival. In 2025 and 2026 Bartsch and Schütze went on tour with their podcast.

== Secondary channels ==
=== Die Nachbarn (The Neighbors) ===
In 2021, Bartsch and Schütze released the investigative podcast Die Nachbarn (The Neighbors), consisting of five episodes. On this secondary channel, they dealt with the double murder of Babenhausen. In the course of their research, Bartsch and Schütze collaborated with ProSieben on the TV documentary Unschuldig im Gefängnis (Innocent in Prison). In May 2022, the podcast was nominated for the German Podcast Award in the "Audience Choice – Knowledge" category. In September of the same year, a follow-up was released under the title Die Nachbarn – Neue Spuren (The Neighbors – New Leads).

=== TRUE LOVE ===
Since October 2023, Bartsch and Schütze have been releasing the podcast TRUE LOVE every second Friday, focusing on true love stories. The creators have stated that the series requires a longer production and research schedule than Mord auf Ex. A research and production team now assists them on both podcasts.

== Content ==
The original concept of the podcast "Mord auf Ex" was based on "True Crime and Drinks". Over the course of more than 200 episodes however, drinking during recording has become more sporadic.

Each episode starts with a musical intro. After that, the hosts welcome the listeners and offer some glimpses behind the scenes, such as the present recording situation or their private lives. Afterwards, Linn talks about a case of "too dumb to commit a crime". In this brief opening segment, she summarizes an unusual or poorly executed real-world crime.

Each episode features one host presenting a researched case. The presentation incorporates details from documentaries, books, articles, transcripts, and official protocols, alongside discussion of relevant historical or psychological contexts.

Both podcasters discuss the cases on the basis of background information, as well as general questions based on different themes.

At the end of each episode, Bartsch recommends an external true-crime media item, such as a film, book, or podcast, in a segment titled "Leo's Tipp".

On the various platforms where Mord auf Ex is available, there is a short description of each episode. A posting on Instagram complements the release of new episodes, containing pictures related to the case as well as a summary.

== Reach and reception ==
In January 2023, the podcast reached a view count of approximately 3.27 million valid downloads. In a ranking conducted by German media analysis group AGMA, this lead it to score 8th place in the category podcast. In November of the same year, the podcast reached the 6th place in the MA Podcast rankings with approximately 3.8 million valid downloads. By February 2024, it had climbed to the 4th place with around 4 million valid downloads.

According to the creators, as of February 2024, the podcast attracts nearly 5 million listeners per month.

In January 2024, the German edition of Vogue included the podcast in its selection of the five best true crime podcasts in the category "best German true crime podcast featuring various cases."

Bartsch and Schütze were included in the Forbes 30 under 30 list in 2024.

== Further marketing ==
Ravensburger released the cooperative audio mystery game echoes Mord auf Ex as part of their game series echoes. In this game, players are guided by Bartsch and Schütze to solve the murder case of British aristocrat and long-time Member of Parliament Lord William Russell in the year 1840.

In 2021, a distillery in Aschheim released a special edition gin branded after the podcast, followed by a sloe gin edition titled "Mord auf Ex - Sloe Gin True Crime Edition".
