= Emmerbach =

River in Germany

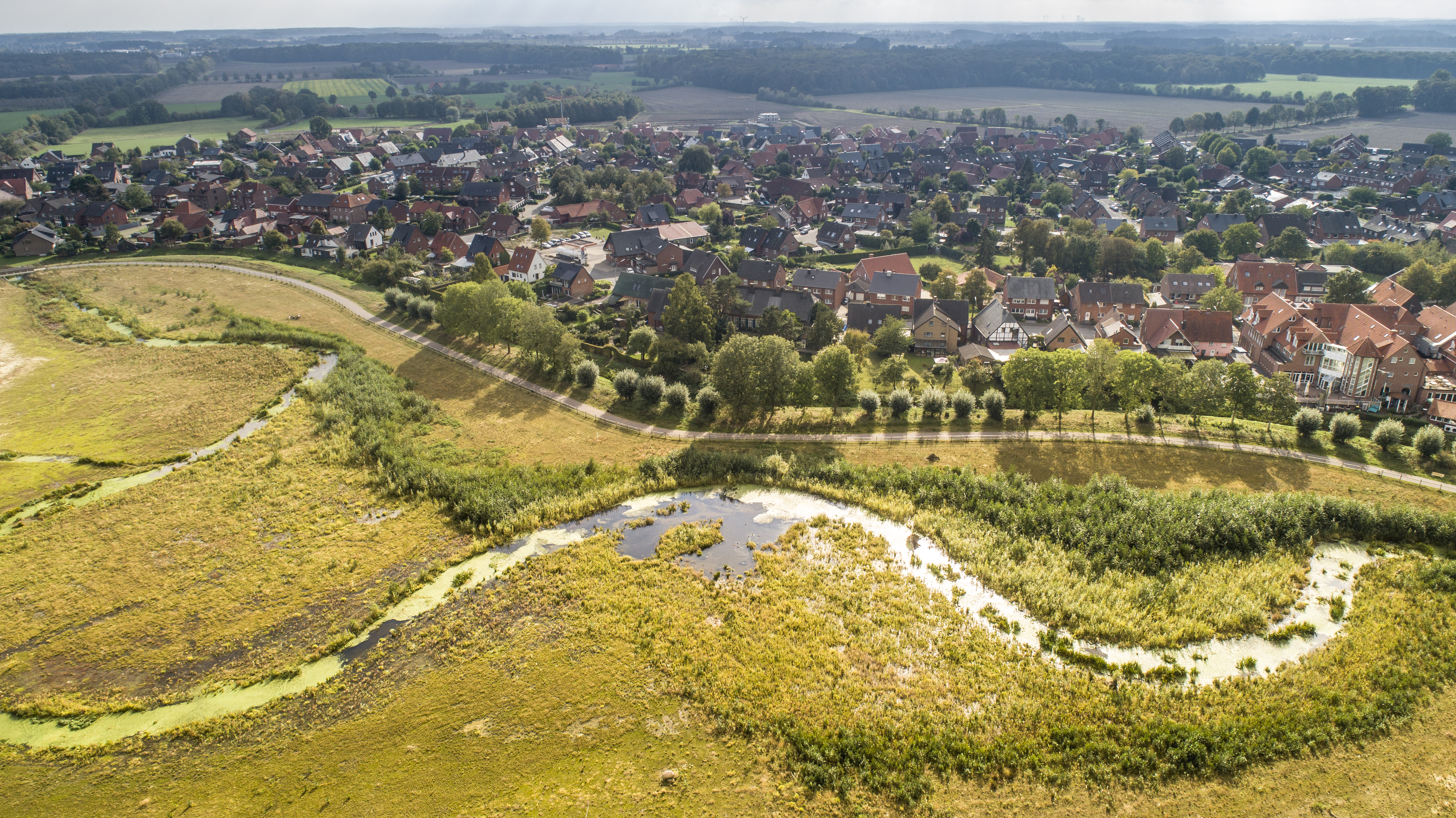

Location
- Country: Germany
- State: North Rhine-Westphalia

Physical characteristics
- Mouth
  - location: Werse
  - coordinates: 51°54′28″N 7°42′17″E
- Length: 35.7 km (22.2 mi)
- Basin size: 138 km^{2} (53 sq mi)

Basin features
- Progression: Werse→ Ems→ North Sea

Emmerbach is a river of North Rhine-Westphalia, Germany. It flows into the Werse in Münster-Wolbeck.

== See also ==
- List of rivers of North Rhine-Westphalia
