= Stromberg, Oelde =

Human settlement

Coordinates: 51.8042°N 8.20083°E

Stromberg (German pronunciation: [ˈʃtʁoːmˌbɛʁk]) is a quarter of Oelde, a town in the district of Warendorf, in North Rhine-Westphalia, Germany. It lies to the southeast of Oelde on Bundesstraße 61, in the district of Warendorf and the Münster region, and has a population of 4558 inhabitants.

== Notable residents ==
- Hermann Nicephorus, Baroque philosopher, born in Stromberg
- Theobald von Oer, 18th-century artist, born in Stromberg
- Henriette Bruns, German-American writer known for her observations on political and social life in the 19th century, born in Stromberg
- Anton Griesedieck, scion of the St. Louis, USA, family brewery by that name, which popularized once nationwide giant Falstaff beer
