= Pauline Horson =

German soprano

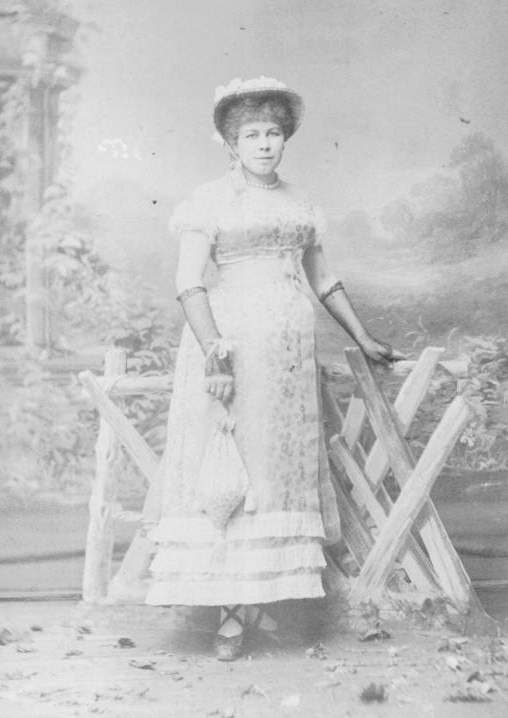
Pauline Horson (stage picture)

Pauline Horson-Brügelmann (née Dyckhoff; 25 March 1858 – 28 January 1918) was a German operatic soprano.

== Life ==
Born in Beckum, Kingdom of Prussia as Pauline Dyckhoff, she studied classical singing with Karl Schneider in Cologne and made her debut in 1875 at the court theatre in Sondershausen. The following year, following a successful guest performance in Weimar, she came to the Hoftheater Weimar, where she finally joined the Sachsen-Weimar-Eisenach. She later was appointed Kammersängerin and remained in the ensemble until 1886.

That same year she married the chemist Moritz Gottfried Brügelmann (born 24 April 1849, Ratingen - died 18 November 1920, Bad Kissingen), a scion of the family that built Textilfabrik Cromford.

At the premiere of Wagner's Parsifal on 26 July 1882 in Bayreuth under the direction of Hermann Levi she sang one of the Zaubermädchen. Further solos as Zaubermädchen followed in 1883 and 1884 and she was known for her interpretations of Mozart's lyrical and coloratura opera arias. She gave concerts and guest performances at the Bayreuth Festival, at the court opera houses of Berlin, Semperoper, Hanover, Leipzig and the Kroll-Opera in Berlin.

Having become almost completely deaf, she died in 1918 in Bonn at the age of 59 from pneumonia. In her will she left an amount of 150,000 Marks in cash from the sale of a house in Bonn and 17 Cologne-Munich railway premium tickets worth 5,100 Marks for the care and design of the Bad Kissinger Ballinghain, a garden left by the Kissingen spa doctor Franz Anton von Balling. She and her husband stayed there several times.
