= Wendelin Wiedeking =

German businessman (born 1952)

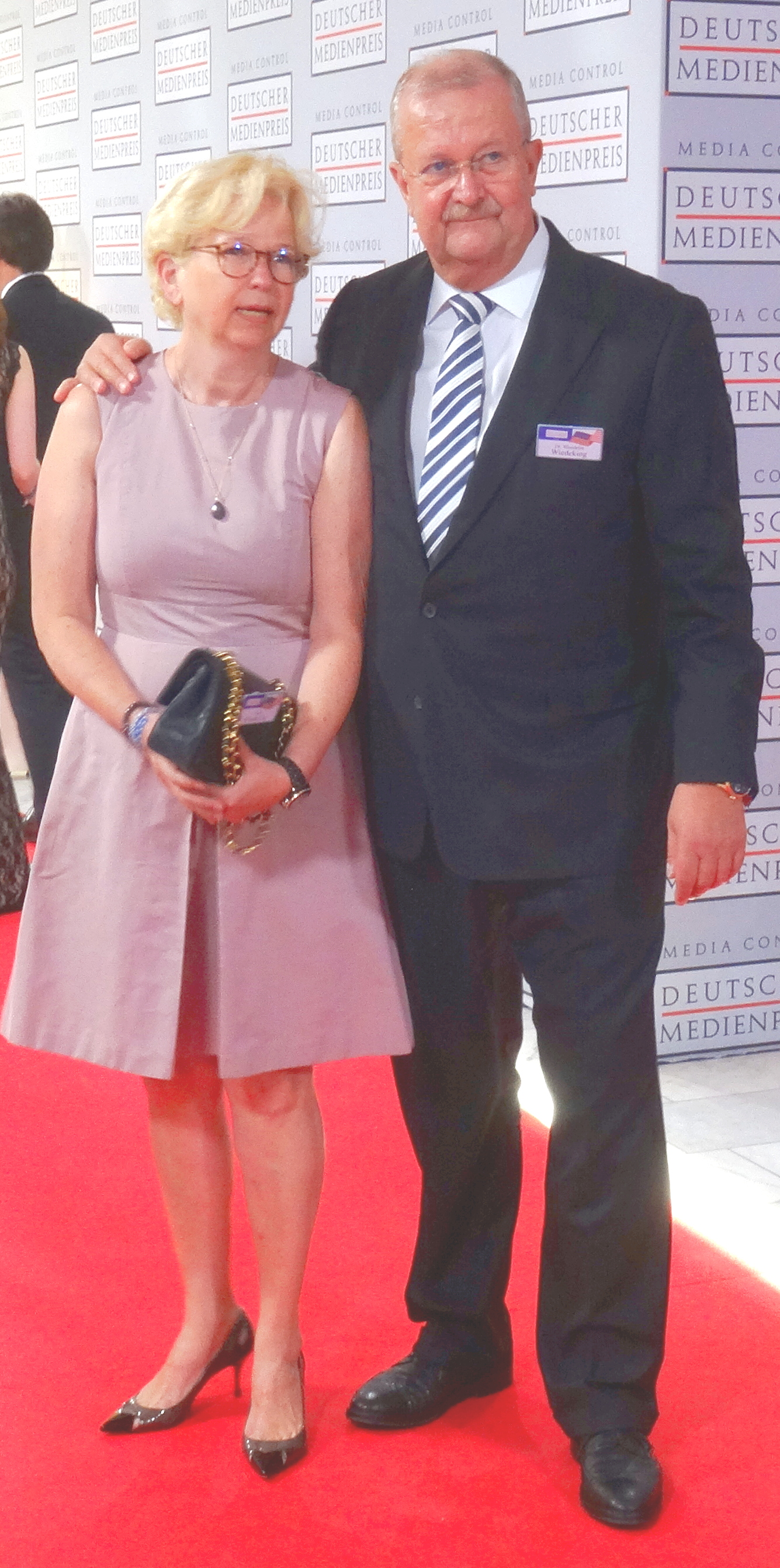
Wiedeking with his wife at the 2016 German Media Award in Baden-Baden

Wendelin Frederik Wiedeking (born August 28, 1952 in Ahlen, Germany) is the former president and chief executive officer of the German car manufacturer, Porsche AG, a post he held from 1993 through July 23, 2009. He was also speaker of the company's executive committee and was a member of the supervisory board of Volkswagen AG from 2006 to 2009.

== Life before Porsche ==
Wiedeking was born in Ahlen, North Rhine-Westphalia. He grew up in Beckum, Germany, and attended RWTH in Aachen. After graduation in 1978, he remained at RWTH for graduate school, in order to attain a doctorate in engineering. He earned this degree in 1983.

== With Porsche ==
His professional career began in 1983 as Director's Assistant in the Production and Materials Management area of Porsche AG in Stuttgart-Zuffenhausen.

A mechanical engineer by training, he joined Porsche in 1983, aged 31. After a stint at Wiesbaden based Glyco AG, a subsidiary of auto-parts maker Federal-Mogul, he returned to Porsche as head of production in 1991, taking over two years later as Chairman (CEO) when Porsche was close to bankruptcy. Due to Porsche's large shareholding in Volkswagen, Wiedeking also found himself on the supervisory board of that company. Some industry analysts believed that Porsche could not survive on its own, but Wiedeking, who says he made his first million by the age of 30 with real estate investments, took on the challenge.

Wiedeking, then 40 years old, who with his spectacles and moustache looked like "a clerk at a venetian blinds manufacturer", according to Der Spiegel magazine, soon imposed his gung-ho management style on the workforce. Within two years he managed a surprise turnaround by trimming the product line-up, modernizing the production system based on Toyota's lean manufacturing system and negotiating new work rules with the unions.

Wiedeking asserted in a 2006 interview that "every product must earn money. Otherwise you are simply pursuing a hobby, which is no task for an auto-business". By then he had dropped the unprofitable 928 and 968 models, overhauled the iconic 911 and developed two new models: the Boxster convertible and the Cayenne SUV. In 2007 the stock market value of the company rose from 300 million to 25 billion euro.

Wiedeking played a leading role in Porsche's attempted takeover of Volkswagen, which was ultimately unsuccessful although windfall gains from financial instruments linked to VW shares helped Wiedeking become the best paid executive in Germany in 2008. The bid left the Porsche holding company with debts of €10 billion, whilst Wiedeking walked away with a severance package of €50million. After his departure from Porsche Wiedeking was charged with market manipulation for his role in the takeover bid. The charges were dropped in July 2016 due to a too little chance of success.

== Other ==
At the suggestion of the Baden-Württemberg parliamentary party CDU Wiedeking was invited to take part in the Federal Convention in 2004 to the election of the federal president.

In the end of 2007 in the annual survey "Manager nach Noten" by the consulting company Marketing Corporation that interviews 1000 managers he received the second best rating. In the middle of 2009 he only reached 12th place

Since 2005 he is shareholder of the shoe manufacturer Heinrich Dinkelacker with 30%. The company’s headquarter is in Bietigheim-Bissingen. In addition to that he invests in Internet firms such as the online holiday lodge provider e-domizil GmbH & Co. KG.

Since 2013 he is establishing the restaurant chain Tialini.

In 2008 Wiedeking founded two charities with 5 million euros private capital each. Both charities, one in his hometown Beckum and one in Bietigheim-Bissingen where he lived for many years, only pursue charitable purposes. Their main goal is to support families, children and young people in need. Among others they support the Seehaus Leonberg and the youth center Sperlingshof.

== Honours ==
Whilst at Porsche, Wiedeking appeared several times in the American automobile magazine Motor Trend's "Power List" (05/06/07/08/09). The article ranks the most influential people in the automotive world; in the 2005 article he was ranked as #6, in 2006 he was ranked #3, while in the 2007 article he was ranked as #4. Wiedeking dropped to #7 in 2008, but reached a personal high #2 in 2009.

Other accolades include

- 1994: Manager of the year
- 2002: Order of Merit of the Federal Republic of Germany
- 2002: Decoration of Honour for Services to the Republic of Austria
- 2002: German Images Award
- 2003: CICERO Speaker Prize
- 2005: Honorary Doctorate from Handelshochschule Leipzig
- 2005: Peter Stihl Prize
- 2007: Order of Merit of Baden-Württemberg (Verdienstmedaille des Landes Baden-Württemberg)
- 2008: European Manager of the Year

== Private life ==
Wiedeking is married and has two children: Isabel Wiedeking, born in 1983, and Wendelin Wiedeking Junior. He currently lives close to Stuttgart.
