= Angel (river) =

River of North Rhine-Westphalia, Germany

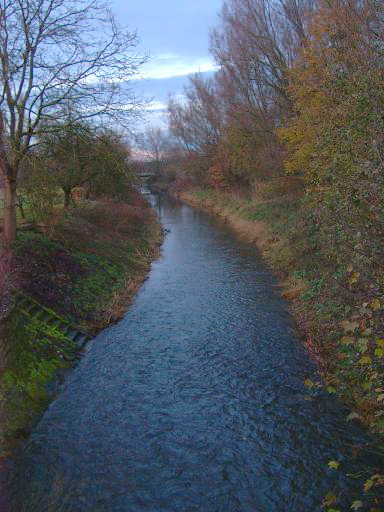
- Angel near Münster-Wolbeck

Location
- Country: Germany
- State: North Rhine-Westphalia

Physical characteristics
- Mouth
  - location: Werse
  - coordinates: 51.9256°N 7.6993°E
- Length: 38.1 km (23.7 mi)

Basin features
- Progression: Werse→ Ems→ North Sea

Angel (German pronunciation: [ˈaŋl̩]) is a river of North Rhine-Westphalia, Germany, a 38.1-kilometre (23.7 mi) tributary of the Werse.

== See also ==
- List of rivers of North Rhine-Westphalia
