= Beelen =

- Town
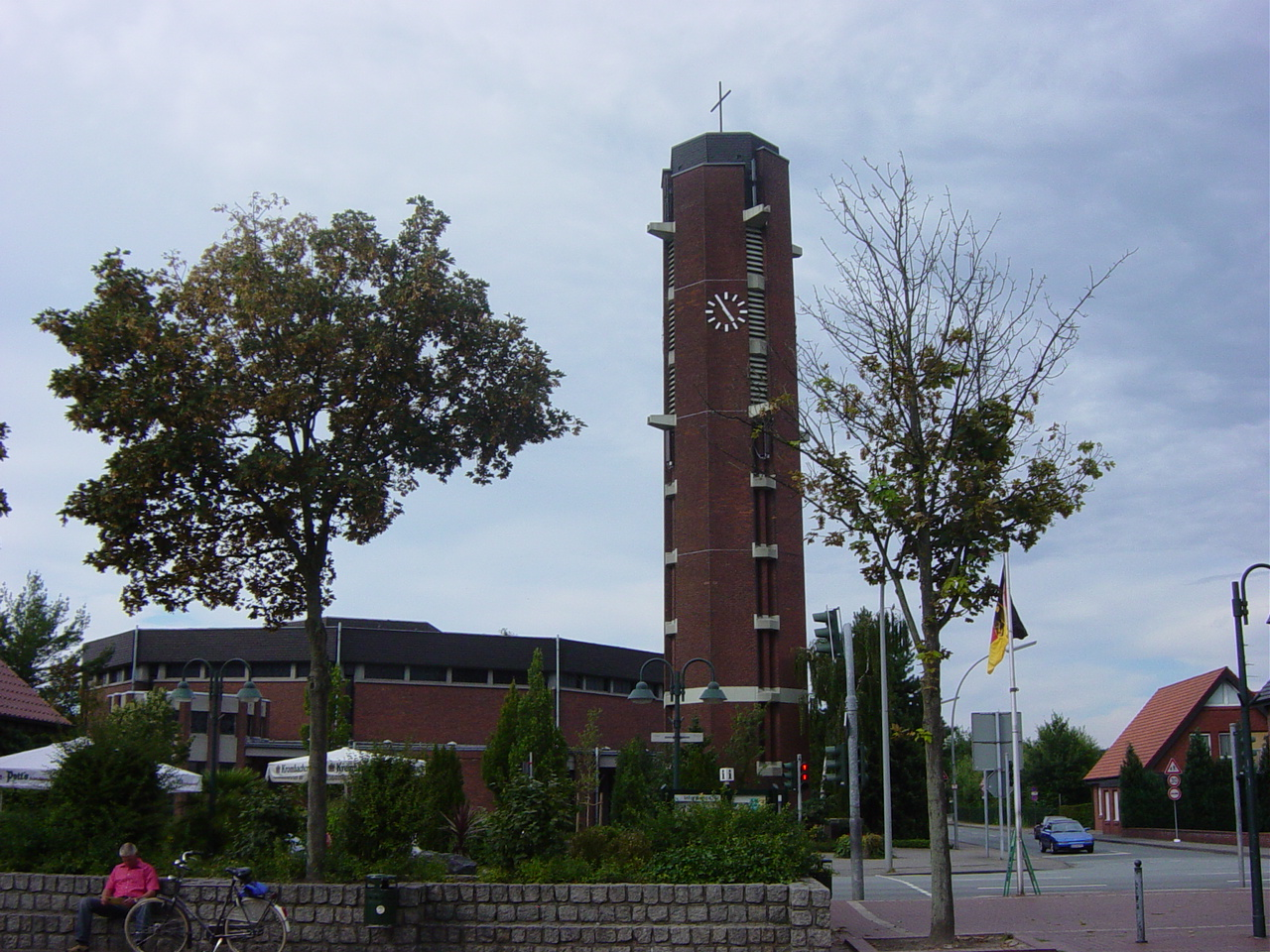
- Church in Beelen

- Flag Coat of arms

- Location of Beelen within Warendorf district
- Interactive map of Beelen
- Location within Germany Location within North Rhine-Westphalia
- Coordinates: 51°55′45″N 8°07′05″E
- Country: Germany
- State: North Rhine-Westphalia
- Admin. region: Münster
- District: Warendorf

Government
  - Mayor (2025–30): Rolf Mestekemper (CDU / FDP)

Area
  - Total: 31.35 km^{2} (12.10 sq mi)
- Elevation: 62 m (203 ft)

Population (2025-12-31)
  - Total: 6,001
  - Density: 191.4/km^{2} (495.8/sq mi)
- Time zone: UTC+01:00 (CET)
  - Summer (DST): UTC+02:00 (CEST)
- Postal codes: 48361
- Dialling codes: 02586
- Vehicle registration: WAF
- Website: www.beelen.de

Beelen (German pronunciation: [ˈbeːlən]; Low German: Bailen) is a municipality in the district of Warendorf, in North Rhine-Westphalia, Germany. It is situated approximately 30 km south-west of Bielefeld and 35 km east of Münster.

== Population ==
Historical population

| Year | Pop. | ±% p.a. |
|---|---|---|
| 1965 | 3,671 | — |
| 1970 | 3,952 | +1.49% |
| 1975 | 4,367 | +2.02% |
| 1980 | 4,774 | +1.80% |
| 1985 | 4,958 | +0.76% |
| 1990 | 5,156 | +0.79% |
| 1995 | 5,800 | +2.38% |

| Year | Pop. | ±% p.a. |
|---|---|---|
| 2000 | 6,194 | +1.32% |
| 2005 | 6,372 | +0.57% |
| 2010 | 6,287 | −0.27% |
| 2015 | 6,380 | +0.29% |
| 2020 | 6,115 | −0.84% |
| 2025 | 6,001 | −0.38% |

Source: Landesdatabank Nordrhein-Westfalen

== Politics ==
The current mayor is Rolf Mestekemper, who has been serving as mayor since 2020. In the 2025 local elections, he was reelected with 79,3 % of the vote, being the only candidate.

=== List of Mayors ===
- 1989–1991: Siegbert Elsing (FWG)
- 1991–1994: Josef Aulenkamp (CDU)
- 1994–1995: Elisabeth Kammann (FWG)
- 1995–1999: Heinrich Schwarzenberg (CDU)
- 1999–2004: Martin Braun (independent)
- 2004–2020: Elisabeth Kammann (FWG)
- since 2020: Rolf Mestekemper

=== City council ===
After the 2025 local elections, the Beelen city council is composed as follows:

| Party | Votes | % | +/- | Seats | +/- |
|---|---|---|---|---|---|
| Free Voters' Society Beelen (FWG) | 1,351 | 45.8 | New | 10 | New |
| Christian Democratic Union (CDU) | 758 | 25.7 | ▼0.8 | 5 | ▼1 |
| Alliance 90/The Greens (Grüne) | 287 | 9.7 | ▼8.2 | 2 | ▼2 |
| Social Democratic Party (SPD) | 193 | 6.5 | ▼2.9 | 1 | ▼1 |
| Free Democratic Party (FDP) | 189 | 6.4 | ▼7.3 | 1 | ▼2 |
| The Left (Linke) | 172 | 5.8 | New | 1 | New |
| Valid votes | 2,950 | 97.9 | | | |
| Invalid votes | 63 | 2.1 | | | |
| Total | 3,013 | 100.0 | | 20 | ▼2 |
| Electorate/voter turnout | 4,728 | 63.7 | | | |
Source: State Returning Officer

== Twin towns ==
- Villers-Écalles (France)
