= Liese (Glenne) =

River in Germany

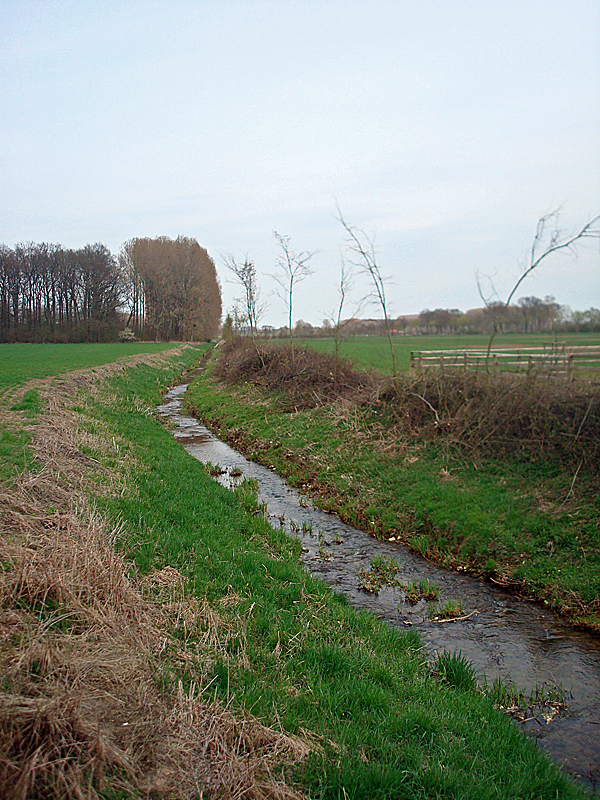

Location
- Country: Germany
- State: North Rhine-Westphalia

Physical characteristics
- Mouth
  - location: Glenne
  - coordinates: 51.7081°N 8.3052°E
- Length: 18.8 km (11.7 mi)

Basin features
- Progression: Glenne→ Lippe→ Rhine→ North Sea

Liese is a river of North Rhine-Westphalia, Germany. It is a right tributary of the Glenne near Wadersloh.

== See also ==
- List of rivers of North Rhine-Westphalia
