= Alois Hanslian =

German painter

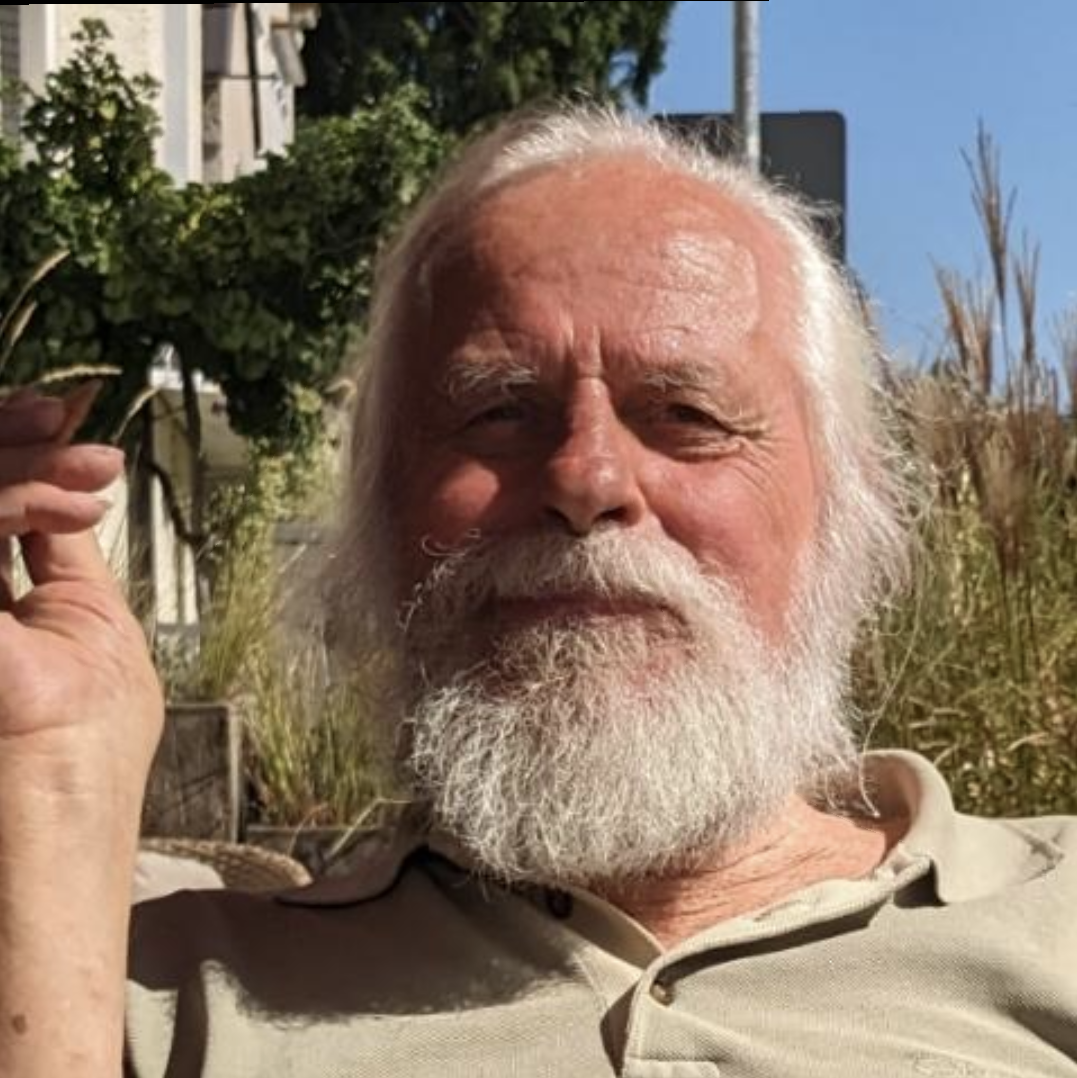
Alois Hanslian in 2023

Alois Hanslian (born 1943 in Ennigerloh, Germany) is a German painter.

== Biography ==
After his graphics and arts study Hanslian was working in Germany and abroad as an Art Director and Illustrator in advertising agencies. Among his work are paintings for galleries and private persons as well as book illustrations. Parallel to it Hanslian is active as a teacher for drawing and creative courses.

== Literature ==
- Reiki: Universal Life Energy, Bodo J. Baginski, Shalila Sharamon, Alois Hanslian & Chris Baker, LifeRhythm, ISBN 978-0-940795-02-0
- The Encyclopedia of Tarot Volume IV Stuart Kaplan & Jean Huets, U.S. Games Systems, ISBN 1-57281-506-X
- Die Bachblüten-Devas, Alois Hanslian, Aquamarin-Verlag GmbH, ISBN 3-89427-034-9
- Mama, wo kommen die Kinder her? Oder Die geheimnisvolle Reise des Engels Ananini, Petra Ostergaard & Alois Hanslian, Ostergaard, ISBN 3-00-000328-2
- Die Orchideenblüten-Devas, Alois Hanslian, Aquamarin-Verlag GmbH, ISBN 3-89427-060-8
- Engel-Tarot, Alois Hanslian, Aquamarin-Verlag GmbH, ISBN 3-922936-61-X
- I Ging-Orakel / Die Weisheit des Tao, Alois Hanslian & Maryam Yazdtschi, Aquamarin-Verlag GmbH, ISBN 3-89427-040-3
- Heilung der familiären Blutlinie - Die Arbeit mit dem Hologramm, Theresia Wuttke-Laube & Alois Hanslian, Ostergaard, ISBN 3-933075-04-1
