= Honebach =

River in Germany

Location
- Country: Germany
- States: North Rhine-Westphalia

Physical characteristics
- Mouth
  - location: Werse
  - coordinates: 51°56′45″N 7°41′16″E

Basin features
- Progression: Werse→ Ems→ North Sea

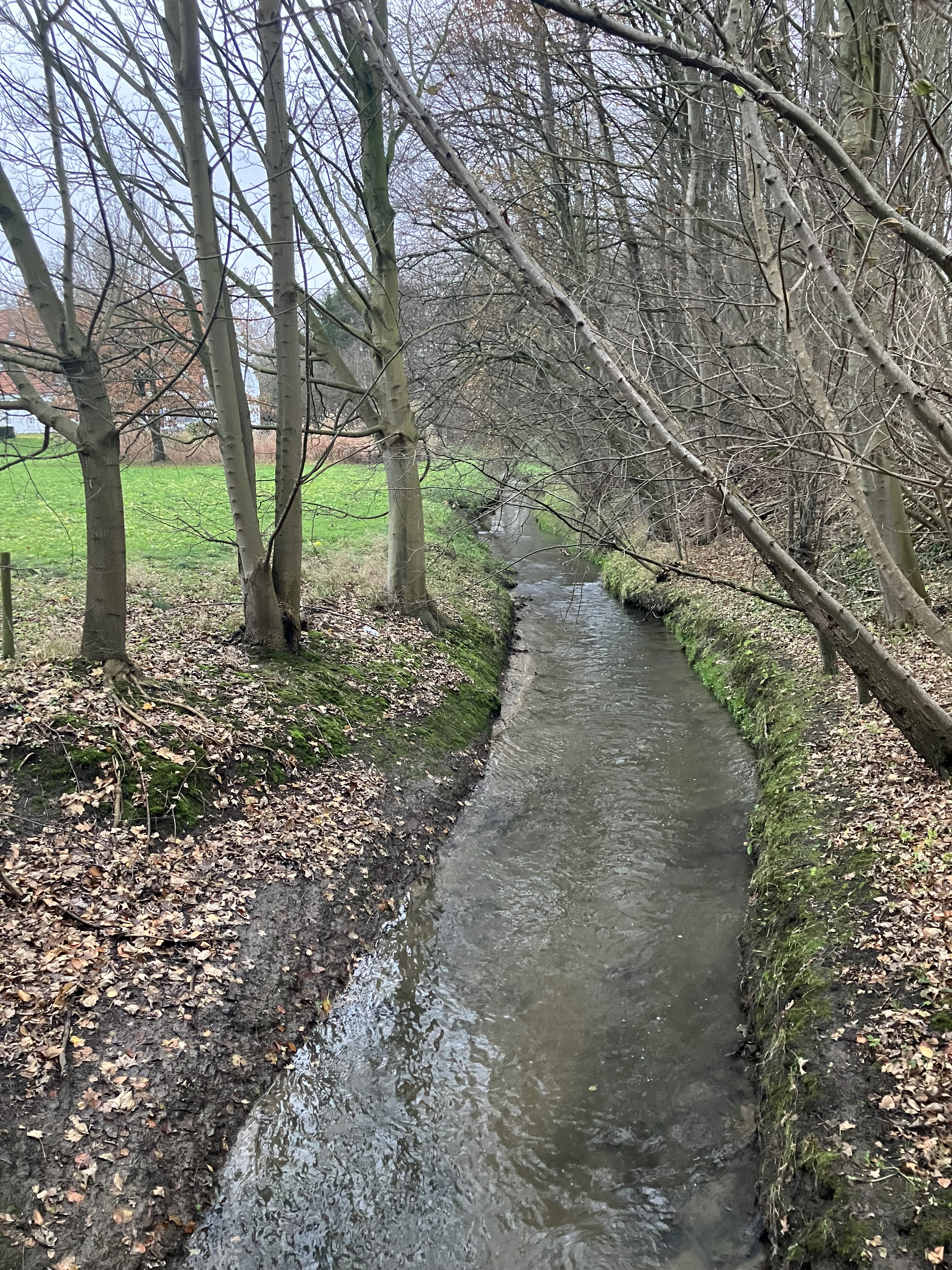
A picture of the Honebach River.

Honebach is a small river of North Rhine-Westphalia, Germany. It is 3.8 km long and flows into the Werse near Münster.

== See also ==
- List of rivers of North Rhine-Westphalia
