= Everswinkel =

- Town
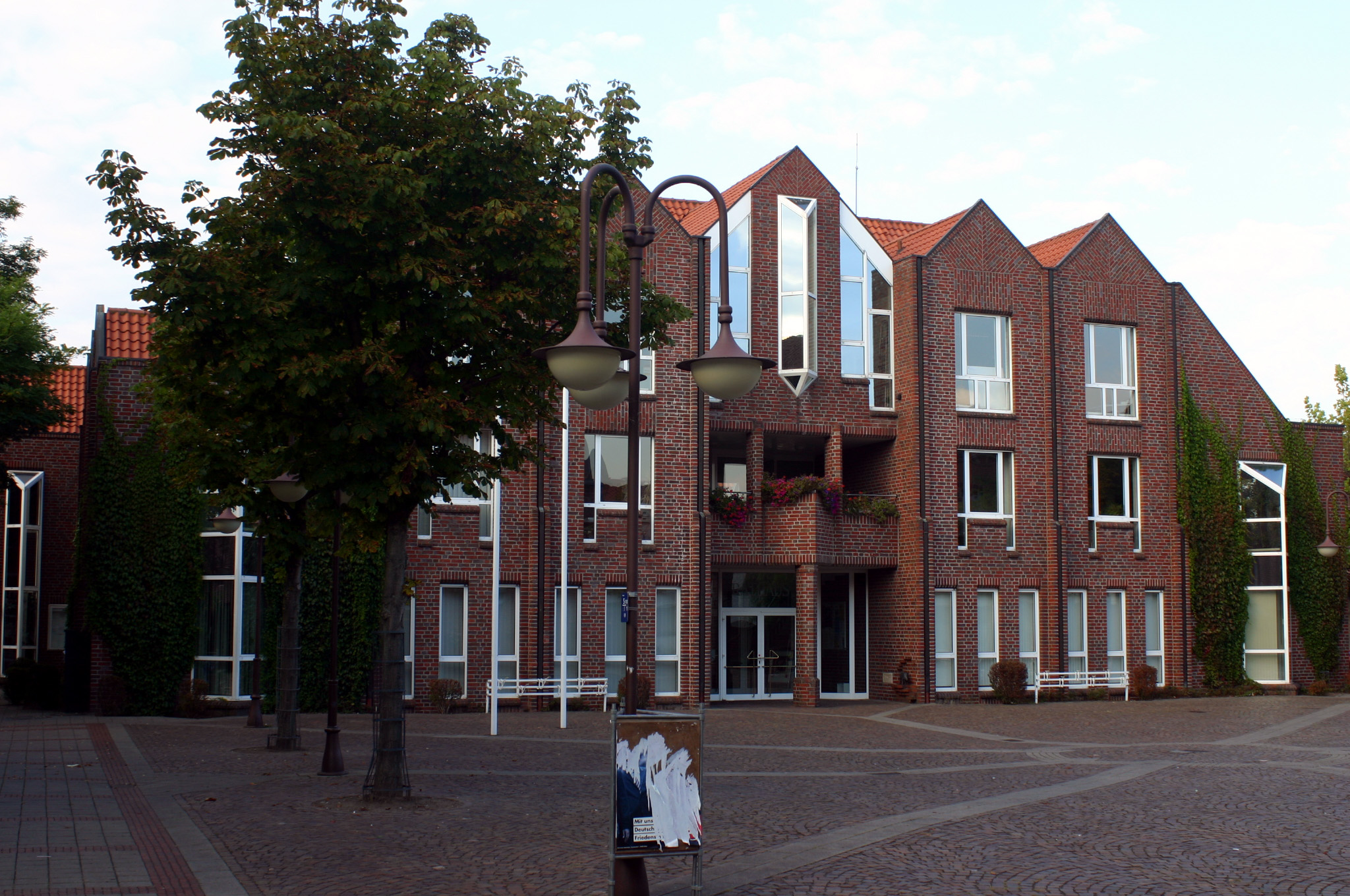
- Everswinkel Town Hall

- Coat of arms

- Location of Everswinkel within Warendorf district
- Interactive map of Everswinkel
- Location within Germany Location within North Rhine-Westphalia
- Coordinates: 51°55′30″N 7°50′52″E
- Country: Germany
- State: North Rhine-Westphalia
- Admin. region: Münster
- District: Warendorf

Government
  - Mayor (2020–25): Sebastian Seidel (CDU)

Area
  - Total: 69.12 km^{2} (26.69 sq mi)
- Elevation: 60 m (200 ft)

Population (2025-12-31)
  - Total: 9,803
  - Density: 141.8/km^{2} (367.3/sq mi)
- Time zone: UTC+01:00 (CET)
  - Summer (DST): UTC+02:00 (CEST)
- Postal codes: 48351
- Dialling codes: 02582
- Vehicle registration: WAF
- Website: www.everswinkel.de

Everswinkel (German pronunciation: [ˈeːvɐsˌvɪŋkl̩]; Low German: Iärswinkel) is a municipality in Warendorf District, North Rhine-Westphalia, Germany. It is situated some 30 km north of Hamm and 15 km east of Münster.

== Population ==
Historical population

Year	Pop.	±% p.a.
1965	3,946	—
1970	4,801	+4.00%
1975	5,714	+3.54%
1980	6,380	+2.23%
1985	7,347	+2.86%
1990	7,976	+1.66%
1995	8,684	+1.72%

Year	Pop.	±% p.a.
2000	9,078	+0.89%
2005	9,548	+1.01%
2010	9,447	−0.21%
2015	9,583	+0.29%
2020	9,613	+0.06%
2025	9,803	+0.39%

Source: Landesdatabank Nordrhein-Westfalen
