= Baumberge =

Hill range in Germany

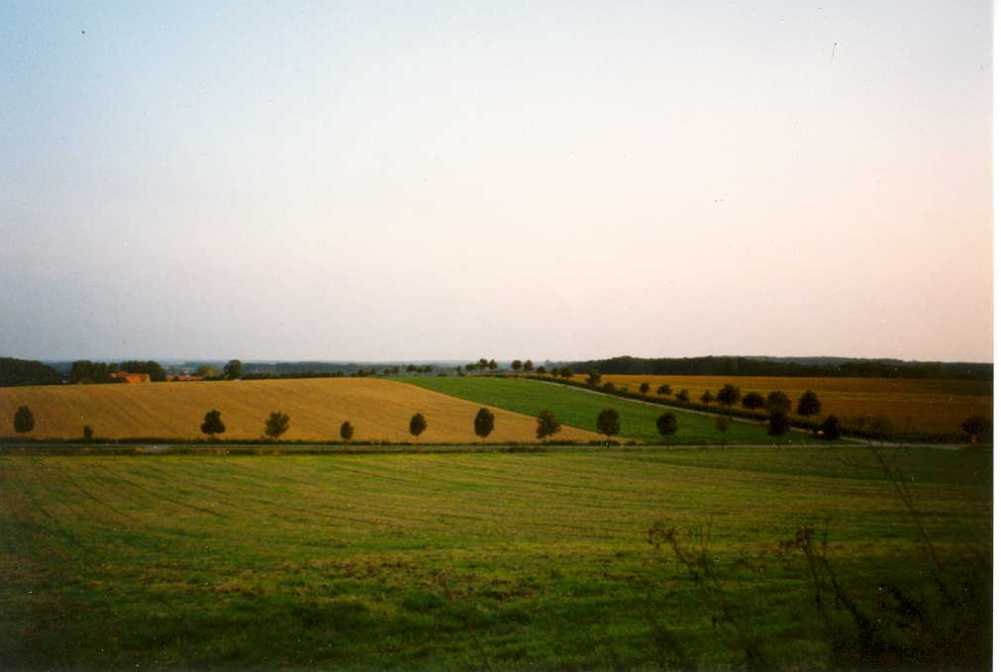
- The countryside in the Baumberge

Highest point
- Peak: Westerberg
- Elevation: 187.6 m above NN

Dimensions
- Length: 14 km (8.7 mi)

Geography
- Location within North Rhine-Westphalia
- Country: Germany
- State: North Rhine-Westphalia
- Range coordinates: 51°57′37″N 7°21′56″E
- Parent range: Burgsteinfurter Land, Kernmünsterland

The Baumberge (German pronunciation: [baʊmˈbɛʁɡə]) are the highest hills in the natural regions of Münsterland and Kernmünsterland with a maximum height of 187.6 m above sea level (NHN). They are located between Münster and Coesfeld, which is itself close to the southwest edge of the Baumberge.

The hilly terrain has several geological, hydrographic and architectural features.

== Natural regions ==
The Baumberge and their immediate foothills are subdivided into natural regions as follows:

- (to 54 Westphalian Basin)
  - (to 541 Kernmünsterland)
    - (to 541.0 Burgsteinfurt Land)
      - 541.00 Osterwick Hills (Osterwicker Hügelland) - 128 m; gently rolling, NW foothills, separated from the Schröppingen Ridge by the Vechte river
      - 541.02 Schöppingen Ridge (Schöppinger Rücken) - 158 m; N foothills of the Baumberge
      - 541.03 Baumberge - 188 m
      - 541.05 Altenberge Ridge (Altenberger Rücken) - 117 m; NE gently rolling ridge, parallel to the Baumberge and Schöppingen Ridge, separated by the stream of the Steinfurter Aa
      - 541.07 Coesfeld-Darup Heights (Coesfeld-Daruper Höhen) - 166 m; SW foothills of the Baumberge

== Location ==
The Baumberge lie within the Münsterland district of Coesfeld running in a northwest to southeast direction between Billerbeck in the west, the Rosendahl villages of Darfeld in the northwest, Havixbeck in the east, Nottuln-Schapdetten in the southeast and Nottuln in the south, Schapdetten being situated on the southeastern slopes of the hills themselves.

On the other side of the Nottuln–Billerbeck state road (Landesstraße) the hills are separated by a 131-metre-high (430 ft) saddle from the Coesfeld-Darup Heights which are up to 166 m high, the southwest foothills of the southern slopes. To the north the Baumberge transition into the Schöppingen Ridge, which after depression of only a little over 100 m reach a height of 158 m at the Schöppinger Berg.

The A 43 motorway runs past the Baumberge just 2 km to the south (south of Schapdetten) and the A 1 passes 8 km to the east. The northern part of the range is separated by the Baumberge Railway.

== Landscape ==
The Baumberge rise over the otherwise flat landscape to around 100 m reaching their highest point in the Westerberg 187 m above NHN; whose summit is crowned by the Longinus Tower. Typical of this landscape a relatively level and treeless plateau with steep wooded edges of uniform height. The plateau is sparsely populated due to its aridity.

The highest elevations around the Baumberge are the Schöppinger Berg near Schöppingen at 157.6 m, Bentheim Ridge (Bentheimer Hohenrücken) near Bad Bentheim at 91.9 m the Gildehaus Ridge (Gildehäuser Höhenrücken) west of it near Gildehaus at around 80 m, the Altenberge Ridge (Altenberger Höhenrücken) at 113.0 m and the Buchenberg near Burgsteinfurt at 110 m.

== Karst hills ==
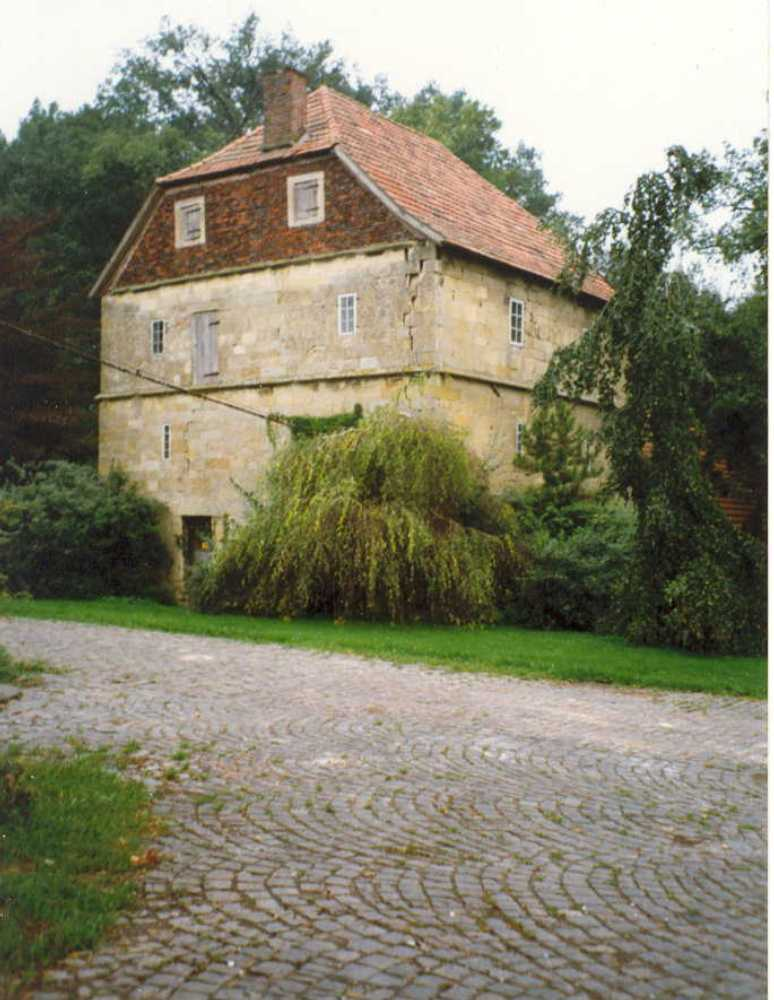
A watermill made of Baumberge Sandstone

The substratum of the Baumberge consists of a calcareous sandstone that is very porous. As a result, rainwater on the plateau soaks away to a great depth. The farms here have, for centuries, had to bore wells 40 m to 50 m deep to collect drinking water – frequently, however, they had to use rainwater cisterns until, in the early 1970s, a drinking water main was laid to them. The rainwater that drains away reappears at the edges of the Baumberge in spring horizons again; sometimes even entire streams can appear at the surface after just a few metres. Several other features of a karst hill range like ponors and sinkholes are also found in the Baumberge.
