= Olfe (Werse) =

River of North Rhine-Westphalia, Germany

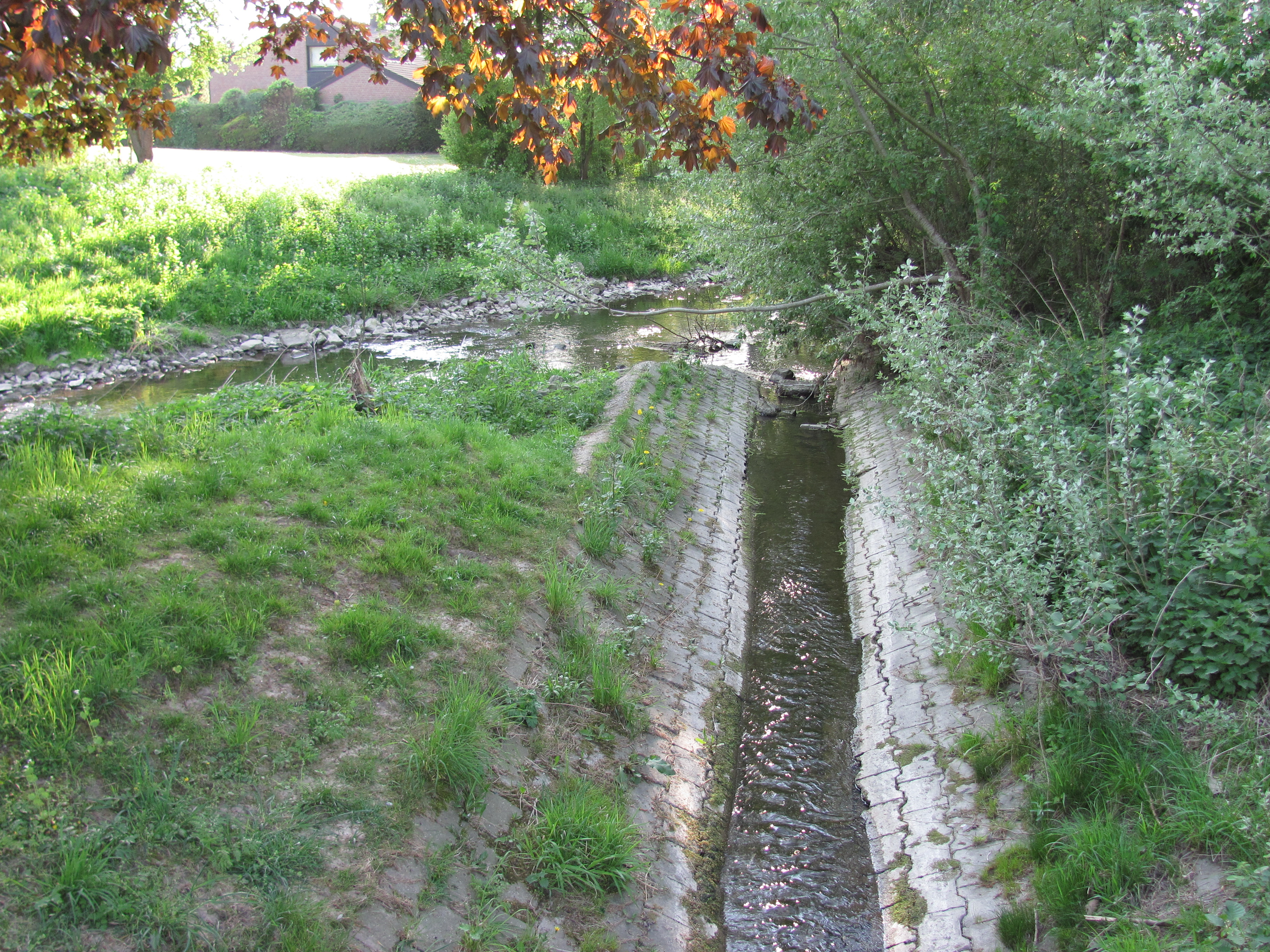

Location
- Country: Germany
- States: North Rhine-Westphalia

Physical characteristics
- Mouth
  - location: Werse
  - coordinates: 51.7710°N 7.8783°E

Basin features
- Progression: Werse→ Ems→ North Sea

Olfe is a small river of North Rhine-Westphalia, Germany. It is 7.7 km (4.8 mi) long and is a right tributary of the Werse in Ahlen.

== See also ==
- List of rivers of North Rhine-Westphalia
