= Henriette Bruns =

1813–1899, German-American writer and political observer

- Born: Anna Elizabeth Henriette Bernadine Geisberg; October 28, 1813; Stromberg, Prussia (now Germany)
- Died: November 7, 1899 (aged 86); Jefferson City, Missouri, United States
- Occupation(s): Writer, political observer
- Known for: Documenting German immigrant experiences in 19th century America
- Spouse: Johann Bernard Bruns (m. 1832)
- Children: 10 (5 died in childhood)
- Parent(s): Maximilian Friedrich Geisberg, Johanna Hüffer
- Relatives: Heinrich Geisberg (brother)

Henriette Bruns (28 October 1813 – 7 November 1899) was a German-American writer known for her observations on political and social life in the 19th century.

== Biography ==
=== Early life and education ===
Bruns was born Anna Elizabeth Henriette Bernadine Geisberg in Stromberg, Prussia (now Germany). She was the oldest child of Maximilian Friedrich Geisberg, the mayor and tax collector of Oelde, and Johanna Hüffer. She had a brother, Heinrich Geisberg.

Bruns, called "Jette" by her family, grew up in a prominent Catholic family in Westphalia. She enjoyed a rich intellectual and cultural upbringing, receiving an excellent early education and participating in the local musical community. After her mother's death in 1827, Bruns continued her studies in Münster, receiving training in household skills as well as formal instruction in subjects like history, geography, and music.

=== Marriage and immigration to America ===
In 1832, at the age of 16, Bruns married Johann Bernard Bruns, a medical doctor. By marriage she became the aunt of Caspar Geisberg, nephew of her husband, who served in Company D of the 8th Missouri Infantry.

In 1835, her husband traveled to the United States to find land for their family, and in 1836 the Bruns family, along with several other German emigrants, sailed from Bremen and settled in Gasconade County, Missouri.

=== Life on the frontier ===
Over the next 15 years, Bruns letters to her relatives in Germany document the struggles and successes of the German immigrants in the "Westphalia Settlement." She took on the duties of caring for her growing family, her household, and her garden, while also helping sick neighbors and entertaining travelers. Despite the hardships of frontier life, Bruns maintained a cheerful attitude.

Writing in 1846, she reported:

This past week we had the visit from our bishop that had been promised us for a long time. Since he, as well as the superior, stayed with us, you can understand that we had a great deal on our minds. The bishop confirmed and dedicated the new cemetery. He is a very fine and kind gentleman, Irish by birth, perhaps of high birth, and was called Lordship. Mrs. Bruns participated in the conversation in English, which amazed the gentlemen.

=== Move to Jefferson City ===
In 1853, the Bruns family moved to Jefferson City, Missouri, where Bruns wrote about political events and family tragedies during the years leading up to and during the American Civil War. After her husband's death in 1864, Bruns opened a boarding house to support her family.

=== Later life ===
In her later years, Bruns tried her hand at farming with her youngest son, but failing eyesight made many of her previous activities difficult. She continued to comment on national and local news in her letters until her death on November 7, 1899, at the age of 86.

== Legacy ==
Over 270 letters, mostly written to relatives in Germany, as well as an unfinished autobiography, document Bruns' life as a German immigrant woman on the American frontier. Her writings provide a unique perspective on one of the exciting periods in American history.

== Sources ==
=== Book ===
- Schroeder, Adolf E. (February 2000). "Bruns, Henriettelocked". American National Biography. New York: Oxford University Press. doi:10.1093/anb/9780198606697.article.2001333. (subscription required)

=== Journal ===
- Faires, Nora; Schroeder, Adolf E.; Schulz-Geisberg, Carla (1989). "Hold Dear, As Always: Jette, a German Immigrant Life in Letters". The Journal of American History. 76 (2): 598. doi:10.2307/1908030.
