= Naturpark Hohe Mark =

Park in North Rhine-Westphalia, Germany

- Location within North Rhine-Westphalia
- Location: North Rhine-Westphalia, Germany
- Coordinates: 51.737719°N 6.917358°E
- Area: 1,978 km^{2} (764 sq mi)
- Established: 1963

The Naturpark Hohe Mark, founded in 1963 is one of the biggest Nature Parks in North Rhine-Westphalia, Germany.

== Location ==
The Naturpark Hohe Mark includes parts of the Lower Rhine Region, south western Münsterland and northern Ruhr Area. The Nature Park reaches from cities like Lüdinghausen in the east to the dutch border near Bocholt in the west.
