= Sendenhorst =

- Town
- Coat of arms

- Location of Sendenhorst within Warendorf district
- Interactive map of Sendenhorst
- Location within Germany Location within North Rhine-Westphalia
- Coordinates: 51°50′38″N 7°49′40″E
- Country: Germany
- State: North Rhine-Westphalia
- Admin. region: Münster
- District: Warendorf

Government
  - Mayor (2020–25): Katrin Reuscher (SPD)

Area
  - Total: 96.95 km^{2} (37.43 sq mi)
- Elevation: 68 m (223 ft)

Population (2025-12-31)
  - Total: 14,110
  - Density: 145.5/km^{2} (376.9/sq mi)
- Time zone: UTC+01:00 (CET)
  - Summer (DST): UTC+02:00 (CEST)
- Postal codes: 48324
- Dialling codes: 02526 Sendenhorst; 02535 Albersloh
- Vehicle registration: WAF
- Website: www.sendenhorst.de

Sendenhorst (German pronunciation: [ˈzɛndn̩ˌhɔʁst]; Low German: Siänhuorst) is a town in the district of Warendorf, in North Rhine-Westphalia, Germany. It is situated approximately 20 km (12 mi) north of Hamm and 20 km (12 mi) south-east of Münster.

== Geography ==
Sendenhorst consists of Sendenhorst and Albersloh. Before the municipal reform of 1975, Sendenhorst was located in the former Beckum District and Albersloh in the former district of Münster (Landkreis). The river Werse flows through Albersloh.

== Population ==
Historical population

Year	Pop.	±% p.a.
1965	8,622	—
1970	8,946	+0.74%
1975	9,418	+1.03%
1980	10,252	+1.71%
1985	10,612	+0.69%
1990	11,409	+1.46%
1995	12,252	+1.44%

Year	Pop.	±% p.a.
2000	12,999	+1.19%
2005	13,325	+0.50%
2010	13,236	−0.13%
2015	13,218	−0.03%
2020	13,289	+0.11%
2025	14,110	+1.21%

Source: Landesdatabank Nordrhein-Westfalen

== Transport ==
The former railway line to Muenster should be reactivated for public transport from August 2026.
