= Werse =

River in Germany

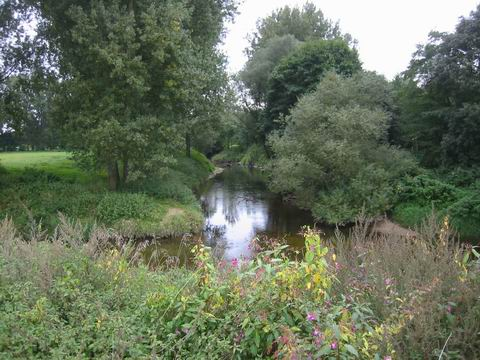
- Confluence of the Werse with the Ems near Münster-Gelmer

Location
- Country: Germany
- State: North Rhine-Westphalia
- Reference no.: DE: 32

Physical characteristics
- Source
  - location: Source: near Beckum from three headstreams
  - coordinates: 51°45′29″N 8°02′53″E
  - elevation: 112 m above sea level (NN)
- Mouth
  - location: near Münster-Gelmer into the Ems
  - coordinates: 52°02′05″N 7°40′58″E
  - elevation: 41 m above sea level (NN)
- Length: 66.6 km
- Basin size: 762.47 km^{2} (294.39 sq mi)

Basin features
- Progression: Ems→ North Sea
- Landmarks: Cities: Münster; Large towns: Ahlen, Beckum; Small towns: Drensteinfurt, Sendenhorst

The Werse [German pronunciation: [ˈvɛʁzə]] (river no. 32) is a 67-kilometre-long (42 mi), left-hand tributary of the River Ems in Münsterland, North Rhine-Westphalia in Germany. The catchment area of the Werse is 762.47 km². Its water quality is Class II-III and, in places, Class II. Contamination from communal sewage farms, fish ponds, but especially diffuse contamination from agriculture pollutes the mass balance of the Werse and leads to eutrophication along the entire river course, especially in the retention basin areas.

== Course ==
The Werse rises in the Beckum Hills near Beckum from three headstreams: the Lippbach, Kollenbach and Siechenbach. The name Werse is used from the Osttor and above the Kollenbach. From Beckum the Werse flows westwards. Shortly before Ahlen it turns northwest and, near Drensteinfurt, then via Albersloh it flows northwards. Near Münster-Gelmer near the Haskenau it finally discharges into the Ems. The river is regulated by several overflow weirs.

== Fauna ==
The Werse is a popular destination for anglers because of its rich fish stock. Perch, Pike, Catfish, Pikeperch and white fish species such as Carp, Tench, Bream occur here. Moreover, rare animals like the Kingfisher and Grass Snake may also be observed along the river.

== Sport and tourism ==
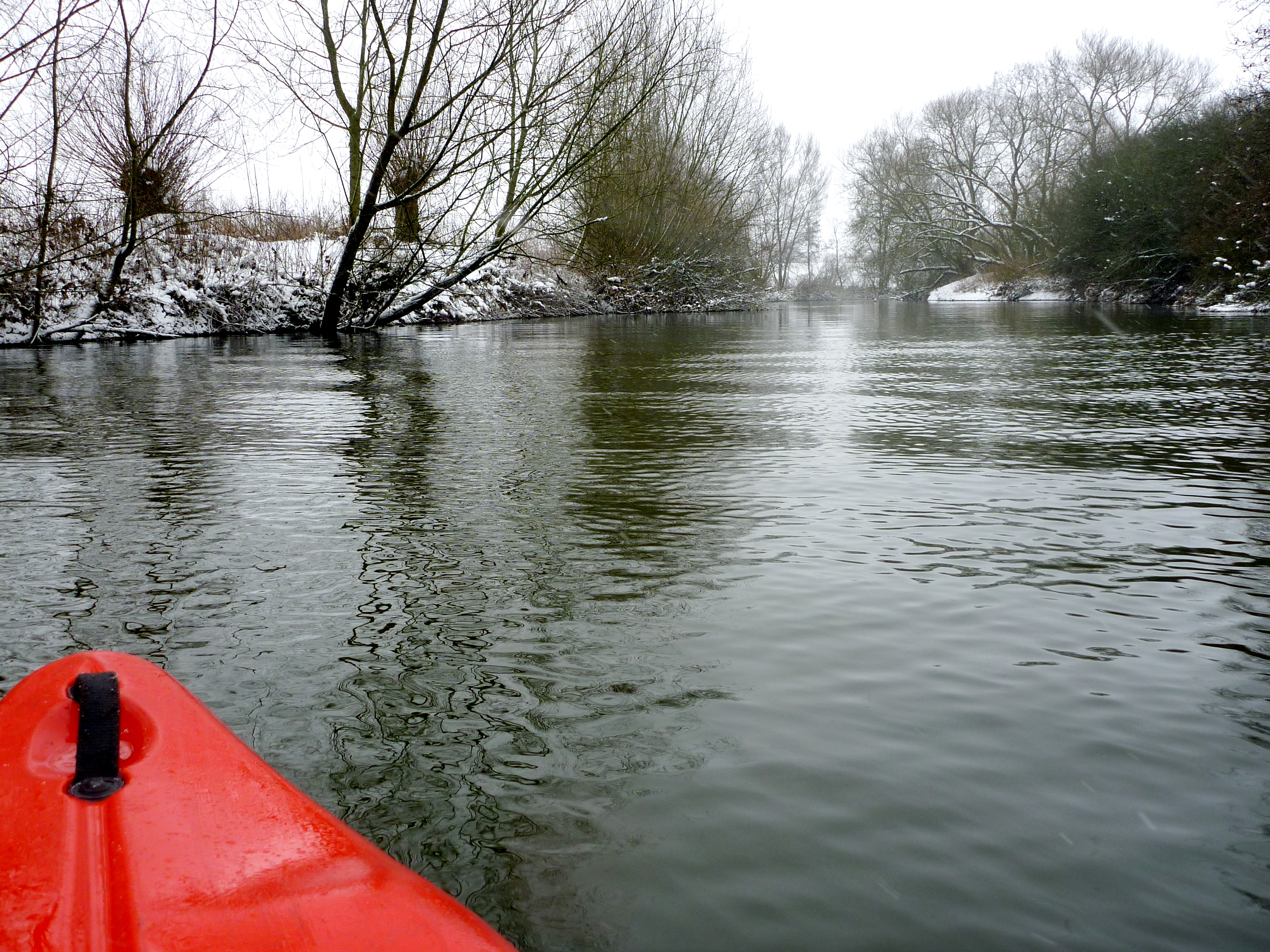
Canoes on the Werse in winter

The Werse is the home river of the Alberslohe Canoe Club (Albersloher Kanu Club 1989), canoe section of TG Münster, the Münster Canoe Club 1923 (Paddelsport Münster von 1923) and Münster Canoe Club 1922 ( Kanuverein Münster 1922) There are also many boat houses belonging to Studentenverbindungen on the river. Especially in summer the river is heavily used by commercial boat hire organisations..

In April 2007 the Werse Cycleway (Werseradweg) was opened. It starts in Rheda-Wiedenbrück and runs along the Werse and its surrounding countryside for 122 km. The cycleway ends near the confluence with the Ems near Münster-Gelmer.

== Stadium ==
- The Werse is widely known because a football stadium, the Wersestadion, is named after it. The stadium is the home of the Rot Weiss Ahlen football club which plays in the German 3rd Division.

== Tributaries ==
- Rüenkolk
- Rattbach
- Stelterbach
- Elkerbach
- Olfe
- Kälberbach (Werse)
- Erlebach
- Suerbach
- Umlaufbach
- Flaggenbach
- Ahrenhorster Bach
- Westerbach (Werse)
- Emmerbach
- Angel
- Honebach
- Kreuzbach (Werse)

== Mills ==
- Werse Mill
- Verings Mill
- Pleister Mill (Pleistermühle)
- Sud Mill (Sudmühle)
- Havichhorst Mill

== Navigation ==
A small steamer plied the section of river between the Sud and Pleister mills in the 19th century during the summer months several times a day.
