= Halterner Mühlenbach =

River in Germany

Halterner Mühlenbach Heubach
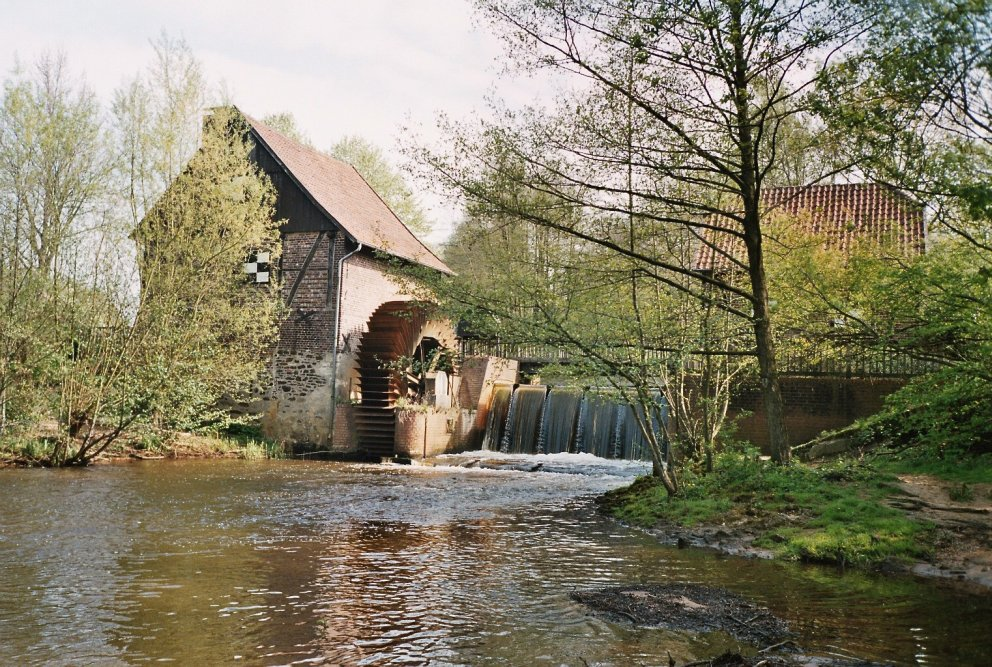
- At the mill in Sythen (Haltern am See)

Location
- Country: Germany
- State: North Rhine-Westphalia

Physical characteristics
- Source
  - location: near Gescher
  - coordinates: 51.9193°N 7.0769°E
- Mouth: Stever
  - location: Stevertalsperre Haltern near Haltern am See
  - coordinates: 51.7537°N 7.2090°E
- Length: 30.1 km (18.7 mi)
- Basin size: 296 km^{2} (114 sq mi)

Basin features
- Progression: Stever→ Lippe→ Rhine→ North Sea

Halterner Mühlenbach (in its upper course: Heubach) is a river of North Rhine-Westphalia, Germany.

Its upper course is the Heubach, which splits up into the Umflut and the river now called Halterner Mühlenbach. The Umflut later reunites with the Halterner Mühlenbach. It then flows into the reservoir Stevertalsperre Haltern which dams both the Halterner Mühlenbach and the Stever, thus it is a right tributary of the Stever.

== See also ==
- List of rivers of North Rhine-Westphalia
