= Ennigerloh =

- Town
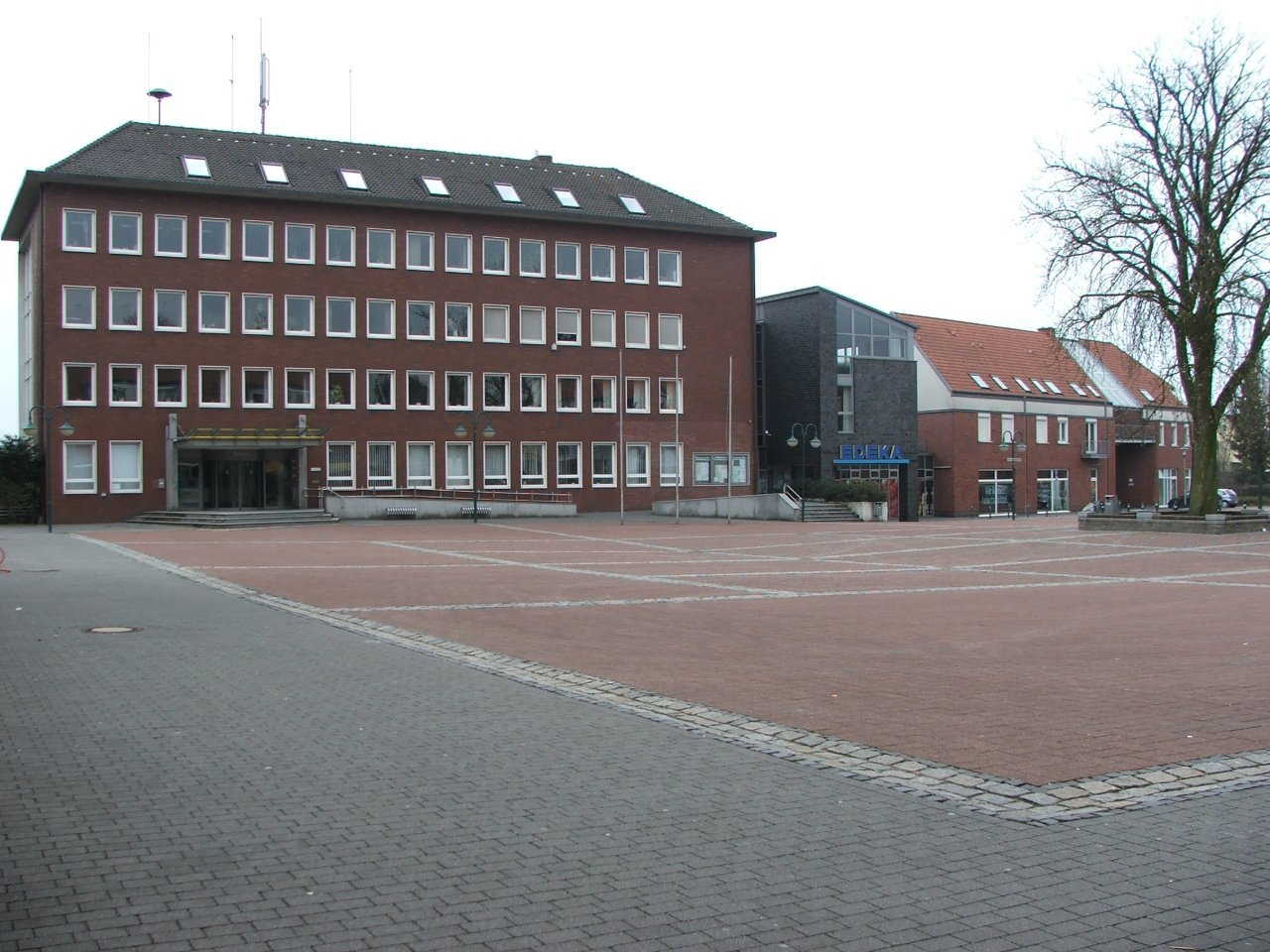
- Marktplatz and Town Hall.

- Coat of arms

- Location of Ennigerloh within Warendorf district
- Interactive map of Ennigerloh
- Location within Germany Location within North Rhine-Westphalia
- Coordinates: 51°50′12″N 8°1′32″E
- Country: Germany
- State: North Rhine-Westphalia
- Admin. region: Münster
- District: Warendorf
- Subdivisions: 4

Government
  - Mayor (2020–25): Berthold Lülf (SPD)

Area
  - Total: 125.56 km^{2} (48.48 sq mi)
- Elevation: 104 m (341 ft)

Population (2025-12-31)
  - Total: 19,640
  - Density: 156.4/km^{2} (405.1/sq mi)
- Time zone: UTC+01:00 (CET)
  - Summer (DST): UTC+02:00 (CEST)
- Postal codes: 59320
- Dialling codes: 02524 (Ennigerloh und Ostenfelde); 02528 (Enniger); 02587 (Westkirchen)
- Vehicle registration: WAF, BE
- Website: www.ennigerloh.de

Ennigerloh (German pronunciation: [ˈɛnɪɡɐˌloː]; Low German: Iännigerlau) is a town in the district of Warendorf, in North Rhine-Westphalia, Germany. It is situated approximately 25 km northeast of Hamm and 30 km southeast of Münster.

The town, located in an agricultural area and with a well-preserved medieval quarter, became more industrial in the 20th century as several cement factories were installed. Some of these closed towards the end of the century. Furniture manufacturing was also a significant industry.

== Geography ==
=== Subdivisions ===
- Enniger
- Westkirchen
- Ostenfelde
- Hoest

== Population ==
Historical population

Year	Pop.	±% p.a.
1965	17,461	—
1970	18,483	+1.14%
1975	19,021	+0.58%
1980	19,450	+0.45%
1985	19,462	+0.01%
1990	19,534	+0.07%
1995	20,552	+1.02%

Year	Pop.	±% p.a.
2000	20,742	+0.18%
2005	20,501	−0.23%
2010	19,701	−0.79%
2015	20,037	+0.34%
2020	19,554	−0.49%
2025	19,640	+0.09%

Source: Landesdatabank Nordrhein-Westfalen

== Notable people ==
- Alois Hanslian (born 1943), painter
- Willy Hartner (1905–1981), professor, founded the Institute for the History of Natural Sciences in Frankfurt am Main
- Karl Weierstrass (1815–1897), mathematician often described as "the father of analysis"
