= Beckum, Germany =

Beckum
- Town

- Flag Coat of arms

- Location of Beckum within Warendorf district
- Interactive map of Beckum
- Location within Germany Location within North Rhine-Westphalia
- Coordinates: 51°45′18″N 8°02′25″E
- Country: Germany
- State: North Rhine-Westphalia
- Admin. region: Münster
- District: Warendorf
- Subdivisions: 4

Government
  - Mayor (2025–30): Michael Gerdhenrich (SPD, Greens)

Area
  - Total: 111.46 km^{2} (43.03 sq mi)
- Elevation: 100 m (330 ft)

Population (2025-12-31)
  - Total: 37,110
  - Density: 332.9/km^{2} (862.3/sq mi)
- Time zone: UTC+01:00 (CET)
  - Summer (DST): UTC+02:00 (CEST)
- Postal codes: 59269
- Dialling codes: 02521 (Beckum, Roland, Vellern); 02525 (Neubeckum)
- Vehicle registration: WAF, BE
- Website: www.beckum.de

Beckum (German pronunciation: [ˈbɛkʊm]; Westphalian: Biäkem) is a town in the northern part of North Rhine-Westphalia, Germany. It is about 20 km (12 miles) north-east of Hamm and 35 km (22 miles) south-east of Münster. It gives its name to the nearby Beckum Hills.

== History ==
Several Neolithic stone cists are the earliest traces of humans in the area around the three brooks, Kollenbach, Lippbach and Siechenbach. Because of these three brooks, the town was eventually named Bekehem or later Beckum, meaning "home upon the brooks".

In 1224, Beckum was granted its town charter, and it quickly grew in wealth as merchants and craftsmen set up businesses in the town. The town quickly expanded to an area of over 22 km^{2} (8.5 sq miles). However wars, riots and the Black Death in the following centuries left their mark on the town.

After the Thirty Years' War, legislation removed several rights from cities and towns, and as a result many cities and towns in Münsterland became heavily economically and religiously dependent upon the Bishop of Münster.

The town's long period of economic stagnation slowly came to an end in the 19th century. From 1803 to 1806 Beckum was under Prussian rule and from 1806 to 1816 under French rule. In 1816 Beckum became the district town of Beckum district.

In the second half of the 19th century, chalk and cement industries developed quickly, and in 1827 the first cement plant opened in Beckum. Eventually the town became one of the most important and largest cement production areas in the world.

After the end of the First World War, inflation brought Beckum's economic growth to a halt. In 1933, the Nazi regime ended democracy in the Beckum town parliament - as everywhere in Germany. During the Second World War, Beckum was fortunate and Allied bombings destroyed only small areas of the town.

In the difficult post-war era, the townspeople developed Beckum into a modern industrial town. In 1974, the North Rhine-Westphalian state government reorganized the boundaries of several districts and towns. As of 1 January 1975, the Beckum and Warendorf districts merged into one, and Warendorf remained district town of the whole area.

== Geography ==
Beckum, Germany

Climate chart (precipitation, max. and min. temperature)
J	F	M	A	M	J	J	A	S	O	N	D
60 5 0	50 5 −1	49 9 2	33 15 5	69 19 8	62 21 11	84 24 13	101 23 13	52 20 10	53 15 7	66 9 4	66 5 0
- █ Average max. and min. temperatures in °C
- █ Precipitation totals in mm
- Source: wetterdienst.de, Deutscher Wetterdienst
Imperial conversion
J	F	M	A	M	J	J	A	S	O	N	D
2.4 40 31	2 40 31	1.9 48 35	1.3 59 42	2.7 65 47	2.4 71 52	3.3 75 56	4 73 55	2 67 51	2.1 59 45	2.6 49 39	2.6 41 33
- █ Average max. and min. temperatures in °F
- █ Precipitation totals in inches

Beckum is situated in the southeast corner of the agriculturally orientated Münsterland. Due to Münsterland's varied landscape of fields, pastures, hedgerows and small forests, it is often compared to a park.

A range of low hills, the Beckum Hills, almost completely surrounds Beckum in the south and east. The three brooks Kollenbach, Lippbach and Siechenbach rise in these hills and flow through the town. They are so symbolic of the area that they appear on the town's coat of arms as three silver wavy lines on a red background. The brooks converge near the town centre and form the River Werse, which flows past Ahlen and Münster to the River Ems.

Although Beckum is located in Münsterland, the nearest large city is not Münster but Hamm, which is 20 km (12 miles) away. Ahlen, Beckum's neighbour 11 km (7 miles) to the west, is the largest town in Warendorf District.

Autobahn 2, which runs from Berlin to the Ruhr area, passes to the north of Beckum. The two federal highways, B61 from Bielefeld to Hamm and B475 from Warendorf to Soest, intersect near the town centre. To the north of the town, B58 connects Ahlen to the B475.

== Population ==
Historical population

Year	Pop.	±% p.a.
1965	36,263	—
1970	37,991	+0.94%
1975	38,375	+0.20%
1980	37,903	−0.25%
1985	36,725	−0.63%
1990	36,772	+0.03%
1995	38,166	+0.75%

Year	Pop.	±% p.a.
2000	37,916	−0.13%
2005	37,472	−0.24%
2010	36,736	−0.40%
2015	36,560	−0.10%
2020	36,637	+0.04%
2025	37,110	+0.26%

Source: Landesdatabank Nordrhein-Westfalen

== Politics ==
The current mayor of Beckum is Michael Gerdhenrich of the SPD, who has been serving as mayor since 2020. In the 2025 local elections, he was reelected with 53,94 % of votes.

=== City council ===
After the 2025 local elections, the Beckum city council is composed as follows:

Party	Votes	%	+/-	Seats	+/-
Christian Democratic Union (CDU)	6,359	41.9	▲4.5	18	▲4
Social Democratic Party (SPD)	4,004	26.4	▼6.1	12	±0
Alliance 90/The Greens (Grüne)	1,515	10.0	▼7.3	4	▼3
Free Voters' Society Beckum e.V. (FWG)	1,253	8.3	▲0.8	2	±0
Free Democratic Party (FDP)	1,013	6.7	▲1.3	3	▲1
Die Linke (Linke)	937	6.2	New	3	New
The PARTY (PARTEI)	82	0.5	New	0	New
Valid votes	15,163	97.0			
Invalid votes	462	3.0			
Total	15,625	100.0		44	▲6
Electorate/voter turnout	29,623	52.8			
Source: City of Beckum

=== Component municipalities ===
Beckum consists of four municipalities: Beckumˌ Neubeckumˌ Vellern and Roland.

== Economy ==
The industry in Beckum is influenced by machine engineering, the cement industry and its suppliers. However, commerce and service industries have also become a strong area of Beckum's economy.

Möllers, Blumenbecker, and Beumer count as some of the largest machine engineering companies. CEMEX and Phoenix both have cement plants located in Beckum. Polysius and Christian Pfeiffer are two suppliers of cement manufacturing systems.

== Notable people ==
- Pauline Horson (1858–1918), soprano
- Uri Avnery (1923–2018), later an Israeli Knesset member
- Wendelin Wiedeking (born 1952), former chairman of Porsche

== Twin towns – sister cities ==
Beckum is twinned with:

- La Celle-Saint-Cloud, France
- Grodków, Poland
- Heringsdorf, Germany
