= Siechenbach (Wunsiedel) =

River in Germany

Location
- Country: Germany
- State: Bavaria

Physical characteristics
- Mouth
  - location: Röslau
  - coordinates: 50°02′17″N 12°01′42″E

Basin features
- Progression: Röslau→ Ohře→ Elbe→ North Sea

Siechenbach is a river of Bavaria, Germany. It flows into the Röslau near Wunsiedel.

== See also ==
- List of rivers of Bavaria
