= Warendorf (district) =

Coordinates: 51°55′N 7°55′E

- District
- Flag Coat of arms
- Country: Germany
- State: North Rhine-Westphalia
- Adm. region: Münster
- Capital: Warendorf

Government
  - District admin.: Olaf Gericke (CDU)

Area
  - Total: 1,317.017 km^{2} (508.503 sq mi)

Population (31 December 2025)
  - Total: 281,872
  - Density: 214.023/km^{2} (554.317/sq mi)
- Time zone: UTC+01:00 (CET)
  - Summer (DST): UTC+02:00 (CEST)
- Vehicle registration: WAF, BE
- Website: www.kreis-warendorf.de

Warendorf (German pronunciation: [ˈvaːʁəndɔʁf]) is a Kreis (district) in the northern part of North Rhine-Westphalia, Germany. Neighboring districts are Steinfurt, Osnabrück (district), Gütersloh, Soest, district-free city Hamm, Coesfeld and the district-free city Münster.

== History ==
In medieval times the region was part of the Prince-Bishopric of Münster. When it became part of the Prussian Province of Westphalia, the new government in 1816 created the districts of Warendorf and Beckum. In 1975 these two districts were merged to form today's district.

== Geography ==
The district is located east of the city of Münster. The Ems river runs through the district from east to west. The Lippe River forms part of the southern border of the district.

== Coat of arms ==
The coat of arms is a combination of the two coats of the precursor districts Warendorf and Beckum. The two sun roses are taken from the Warendorf coat of arms, which took it from the family coat of arms of the Vogt family in Warendorpe. The wavy line comes from the Beckum coat of arms, and symbolized the richness of water in the area, especially the Werse river. The coat of arms was granted in 1976.

== Towns and municipalities ==
Clickable map of towns and municipalities in the district

Towns
1. Ahlen
2. Beckum
3. Drensteinfurt
4. Ennigerloh
5. Oelde
6. Sassenberg
7. Sendenhorst
8. Telgte
9. Warendorf
Municipalities
1. Beelen
2. Everswinkel
3. Ostbevern
4. Wadersloh
