= Stever (river) =

River in Germany

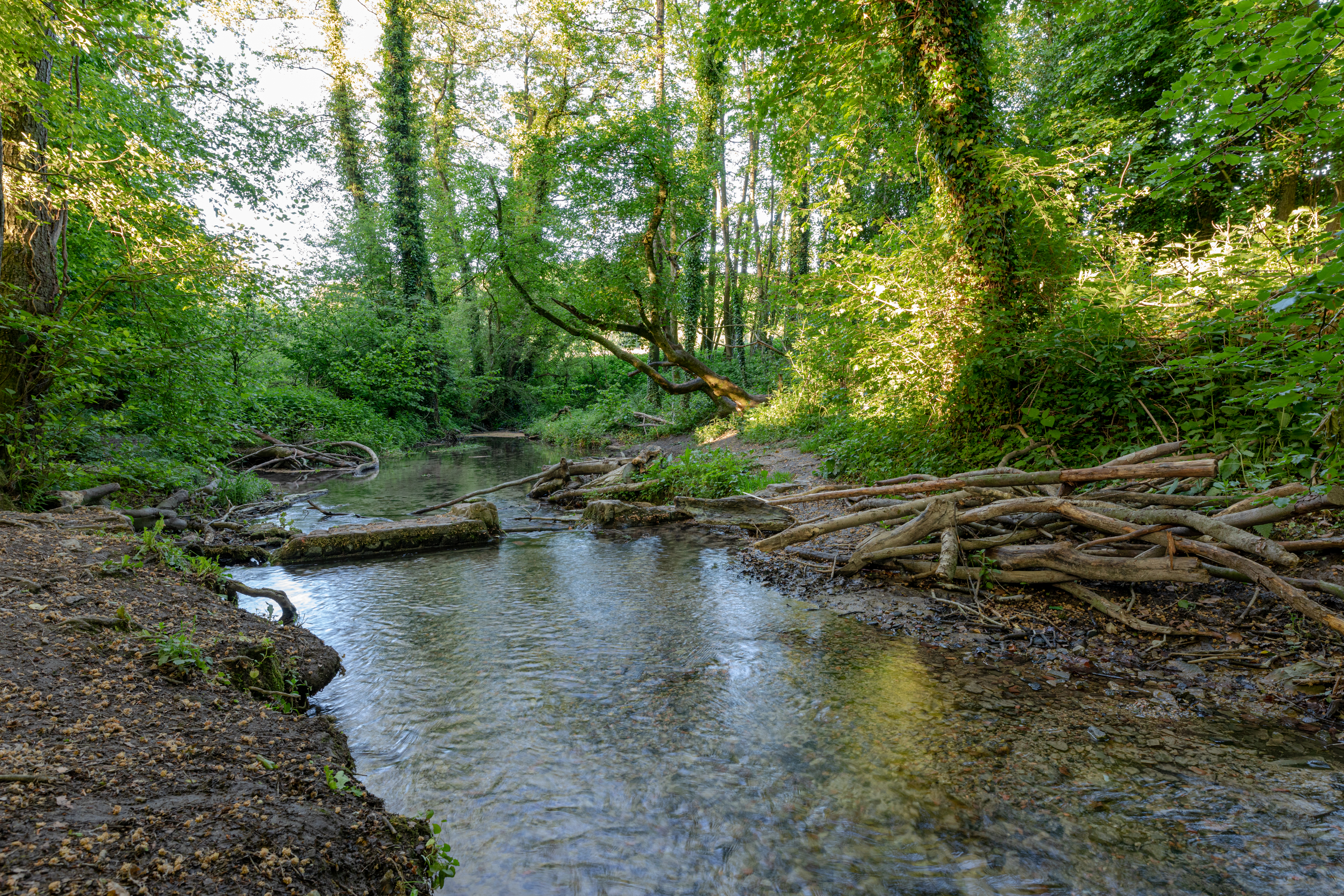

Location
- Country: Germany
- State: North Rhine-Westphalia

Physical characteristics
- Mouth
  - location: Lippe
  - coordinates: 51.7350°N 7.1914°E
- Length: 58.0 km (36.0 mi)
- Basin size: 924 km^{2} (357 sq mi)

Basin features
- Progression: Lippe→ Rhine→ North Sea
- Tributaries
  - right: Halterner Mühlenbach

Stever is a river of North Rhine-Westphalia, Germany. It flows into the Lippe in Haltern am See.

== See also ==
- List of rivers of North Rhine-Westphalia
