= Kollenbach =

River in Germany

Location
- Country: Germany
- State: North Rhine-Westphalia

Physical characteristics
- Mouth
  - location: Beckum, North Rhine-Westphalia, Germany
  - coordinates: 51°45′17″N 8°02′42″E

Basin features
- Progression: Werse→ Ems→ North Sea

Kollenbach also known as Collenbach is a river in Beckum, North Rhine-Westphalia, Germany. It is a headwater of the Werse.

== See also ==
- List of rivers of North Rhine-Westphalia
