= Longinus Tower =

Coordinates: 51°57′36″N 7°21′56″E

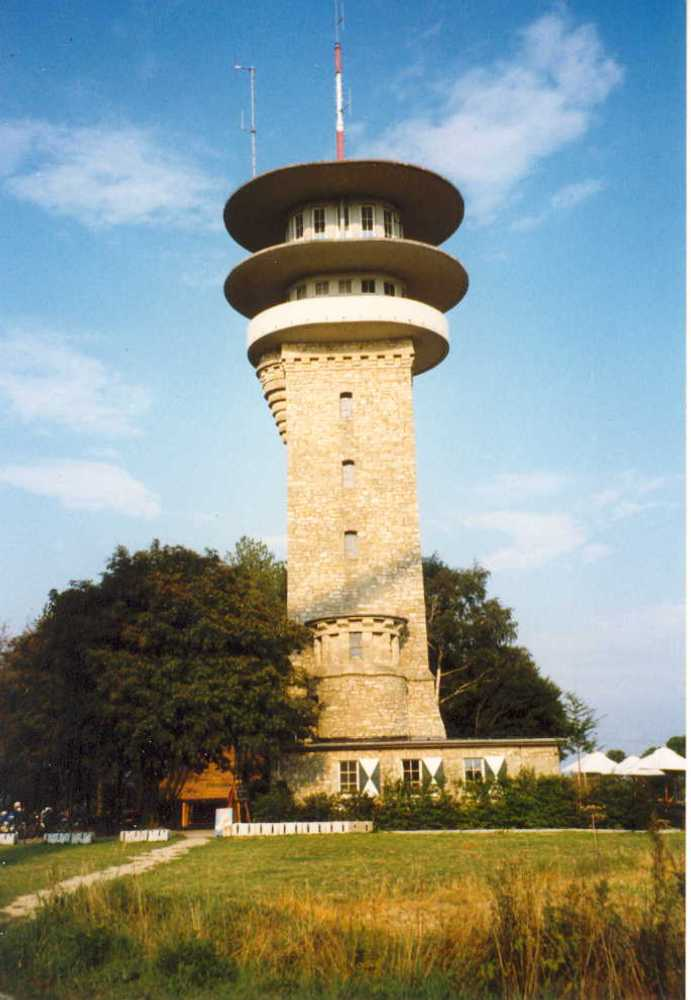
The Longinus Tower

The Longinus Tower (Longinusturm) is a 32-metre-high observation tower located in Nottuln, Germany. It was erected by the Baumberge Club between 1897 and 1901 on the summit of the 182.61-metre-high Westerberg hill. The Longinus Tower is made of calcareous sandstone.

At the beginning of the 1950s, the Longinus Tower was adapted to become a telecommunication tower with an observation deck and antenna systems that rather spoilt its appearance architecturally.

It was from the Longinus Tower that, in 1952, Reinhold Holtstiege, transmitted the first public television programmes after World War II. As it had no connection to the grid, the transmitter was powered by a transformer from a car battery.

Later the Longinus Tower was used as TV transmitter. But its relatively low height was not enough to meet the demand, and so a 182-metre-high, steel tube mast was built in the vicinity, guyed at 70 and 143 metres. In 2005 this mast was replaced by a 181.2-metre-high, steel lattice mast, guyed at 3 levels – 47, 97 and 147 metres – as the old mast was unable to carry antennas for digital TV.

In 1992 a wind measurement system was installed on the top of the tower. In 1993 and 1994 two wind turbines were built nearby.

== Sources ==
- Longinusturm at www.longinusturm.de (in German)
