= Wadersloh =

- Municipality
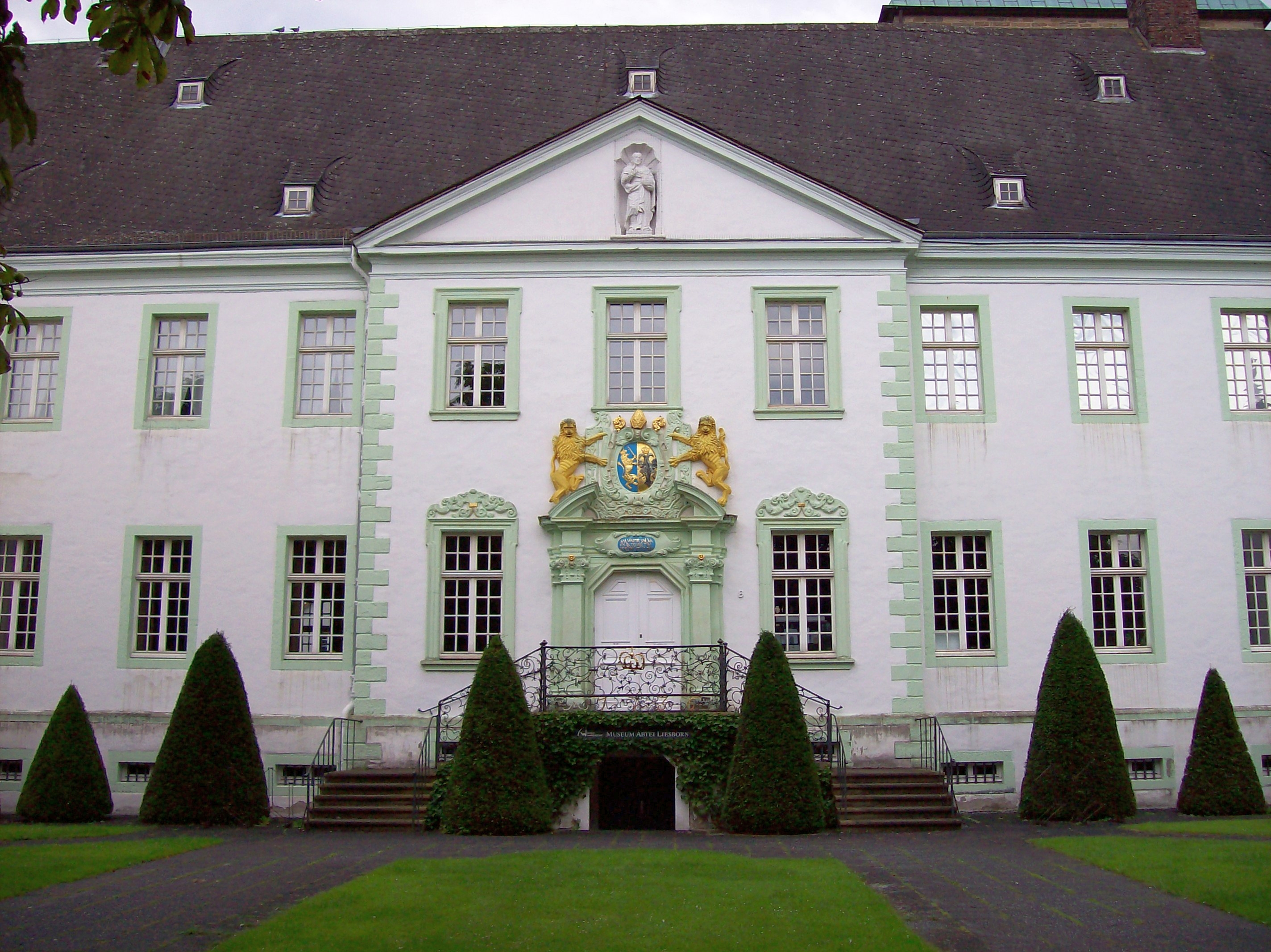
- Portal of Abtei Liesborn in Liesborn, a part of the municipality of Wadersloh

- Coat of arms

- Location of Wadersloh within Warendorf district
- Interactive map of Wadersloh
- Location within Germany Location within North Rhine-Westphalia
- Coordinates: 51°44′19″N 8°15′5″E
- Country: Germany
- State: North Rhine-Westphalia
- Admin. region: Münster
- District: Warendorf
- Subdivisions: 3

Government
  - Mayor (2020–25): Christian Thegelkamp (Ind.)

Area
  - Total: 117.03 km^{2} (45.19 sq mi)
- Elevation: 78 m (256 ft)

Population (2025-12-31)
  - Total: 12,826
  - Density: 109.60/km^{2} (283.85/sq mi)
- Time zone: UTC+01:00 (CET)
  - Summer (DST): UTC+02:00 (CEST)
- Postal codes: 59329
- Dialling codes: 02523, 02520, 02945
- Vehicle registration: WAF
- Website: www.wadersloh.de

Wadersloh (German pronunciation: [ˈvaːdɐsloː]) is a municipality in the district of Warendorf, in North Rhine-Westphalia, Germany. It is situated approximately 10 km north-west of Lippstadt and 30 km east of Hamm. In it there is a grammar school which is named Gymnasium Johanneum. Wadersloh was the place of a bike race in 2008 with competitors from all over the world.

== Population ==
Historical population

Year	Pop.	±% p.a.
1965	10,992	—
1970	11,159	+0.30%
1975	10,693	−0.85%
1980	11,085	+0.72%
1985	11,214	+0.23%
1990	12,121	+1.57%
1995	12,944	+1.32%

Year	Pop.	±% p.a.
2000	13,203	+0.40%
2005	13,118	−0.13%
2010	12,596	−0.81%
2015	12,443	−0.24%
2020	12,556	+0.18%
2025	12,826	+0.43%

Source: Landesdatabank Nordrhein-Westfalen

== Mayors ==
Christian Thegelkamp was elected mayor in 2009 and reelected in 2014 and 2020.
