= Ascheberg (Westf) station =

Railway station in Coesfeld, Germany

Ascheberg (Westf)
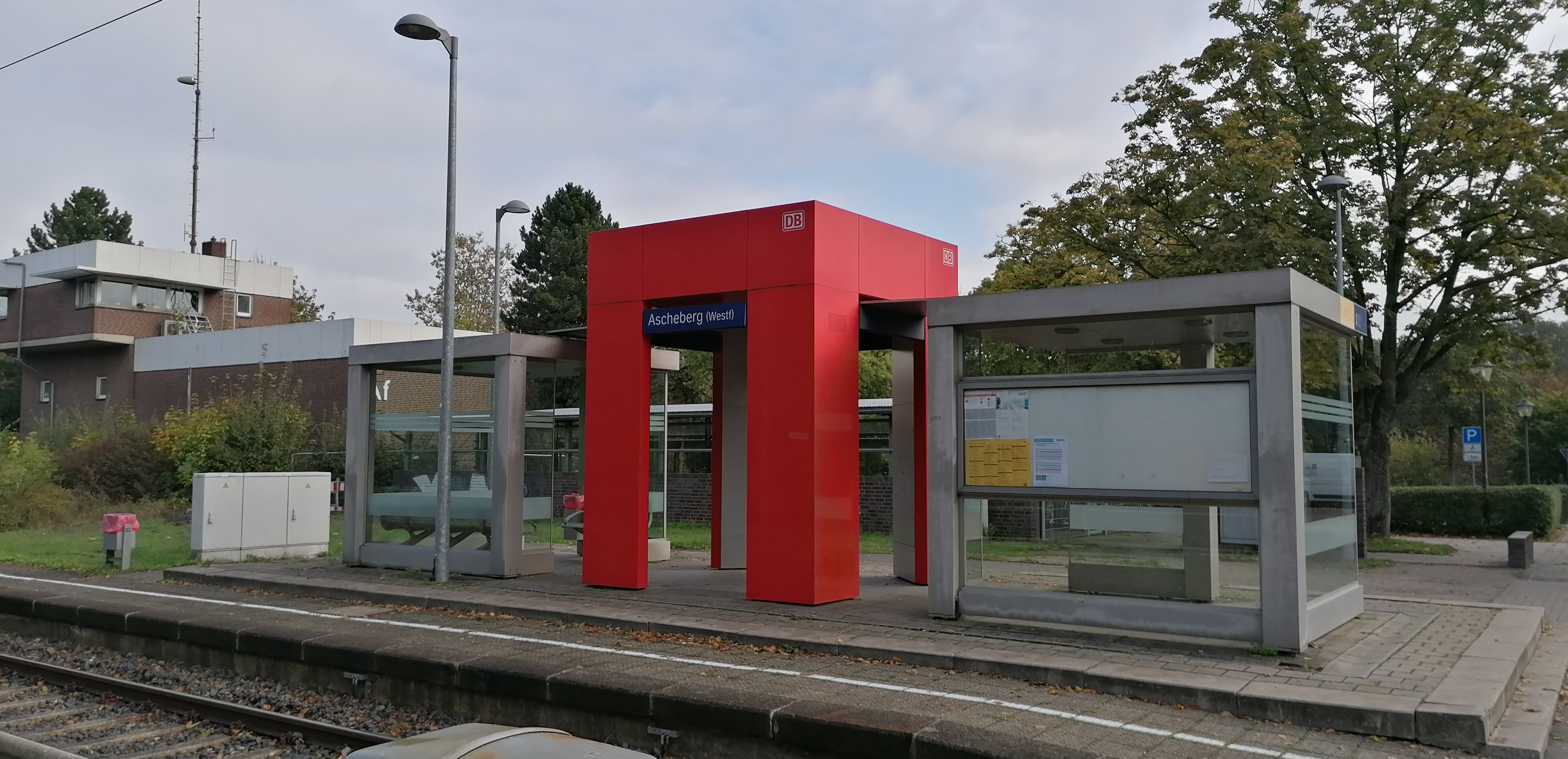
- 2019

General information
- Location: Breil 12; 59387 Ascheberg (Westfalen); North Rhine-Westphalia; Germany
- Coordinates: 51.7830°N 7.6012°E
- System: Bf
- Owner: Deutsche Bahn
- Operator: DB Netz; DB Station&Service
- Lines: Preußen–Münster railway (KBS 411)
- Platforms: 2 side platforms
- Tracks: 2
- Train operators: eurobahn
- Connections: RB 50

Construction
- Parking: yes
- Cycle facilities: yes
- Accessible: yes

Other information
- Station code: 192
- DS100 code: EASB
- IBNR: 8000623
- Category: 6
- Fare zone: Westfalentarif: 55561
- Website: www.bahnhof.de

Services
Preceding station		Following station
Davensberg towards Münster Hbf	RB 50	Capelle (Westf) towards Dortmund Hbf
Location
- Location within North Rhine-Westphalia Location within Germany Location within Europe

Ascheberg (Westf) station (German: Bahnhof Ascheberg (Westf)) is a railway station in the municipality of Ascheberg (Westfalen), located in the Coesfeld district in North Rhine-Westphalia, Germany.
