= Senden, North Rhine-Westphalia =

Senden
- Municipality
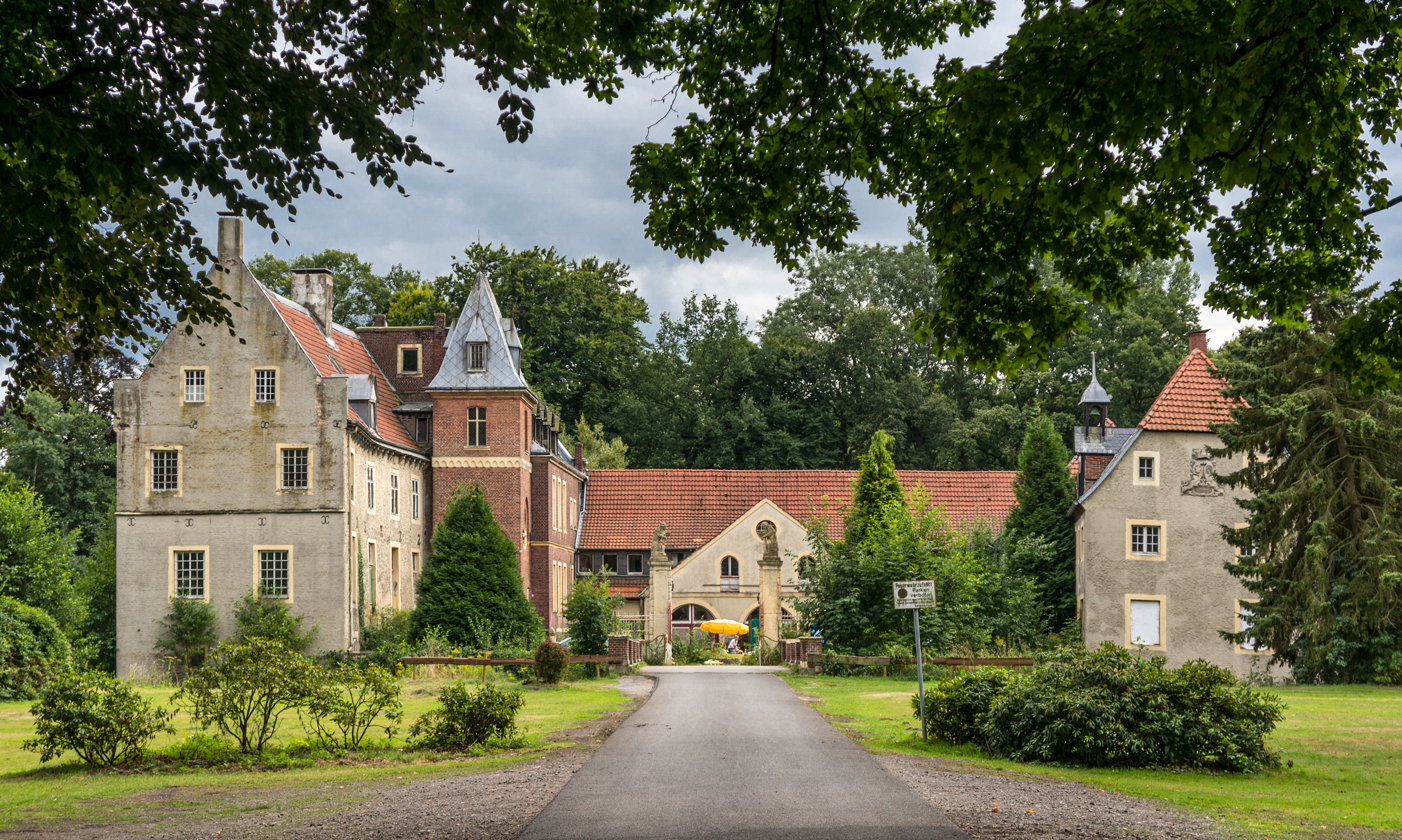
- Senden Castle

- Coat of arms

- Location of Senden within Coesfeld district
- Interactive map of Senden
- Location within Germany Location within North Rhine-Westphalia
- Coordinates: 51°51′26″N 7°28′58″E
- Country: Germany
- State: North Rhine-Westphalia
- Admin. region: Münster
- District: Coesfeld
- Subdivisions: 4

Government
  - Mayor (2020–25): Sebastian Täger (Ind.)

Area
  - Total: 109.45 km^{2} (42.26 sq mi)
- Elevation: 54–91 m (177–299 ft)

Population (2025-12-31)
  - Total: 21,000
  - Density: 190/km^{2} (500/sq mi)
- Time zone: UTC+01:00 (CET)
  - Summer (DST): UTC+02:00 (CEST)
- Postal codes: 48308
- Dialling codes: 02597, 02598, 02536
- Vehicle registration: COE, LH
- Website: www.senden-westfalen.de

Senden (German pronunciation: [ˈzɛndn̩]) is a municipality in the district of Coesfeld, in North Rhine-Westphalia, Germany.

== Geography ==
=== Geographic location ===
The municipality of Senden is situated in the east of the district of Coesfeld, approx. 15 km south-west of the city of Münster.

The river Stever and the Dortmund-Ems Canal are partially situated in the municipality of Senden.

=== Neighbouring municipalities ===
- City:
  - Münster
- Towns:
  - Dülmen
  - Lüdinghausen
- Municipalities (villages):
  - Ascheberg
  - Havixbeck
  - Nordkirchen
  - Nottuln

=== Division of the municipality ===
The municipality of Senden consists of 4 villages:

- Bösensell
- Ottmarsbocholt
- Senden
- Venne

=== Special natural site ===
Near the village of Venne there is a marshland called Venner Moor. This nature reserve is situated near the Dortmund-Ems Canal and consists of some large swamps. Especially in spring and in fall the area shows its beautiful nature.

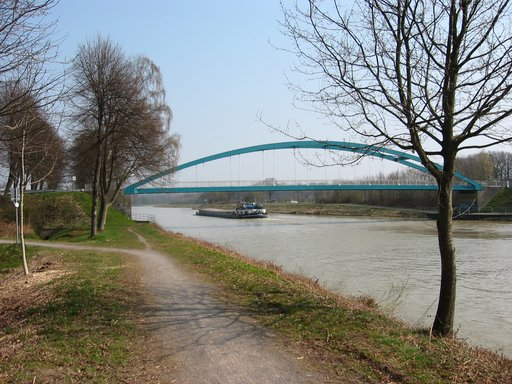
Dortmund-Ems Canal splits Senden in two parts

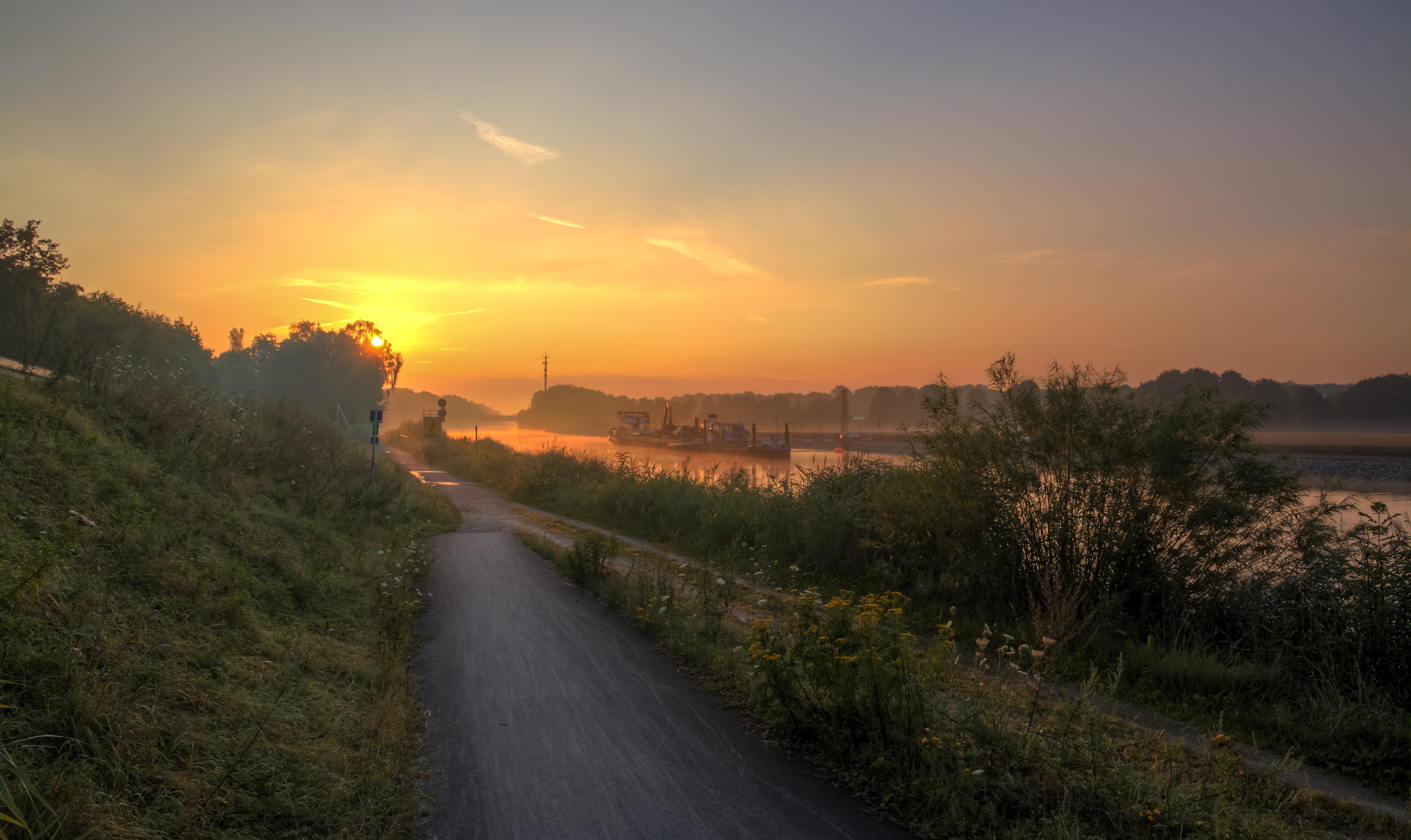
Dortmund-Ems Canal in the morning

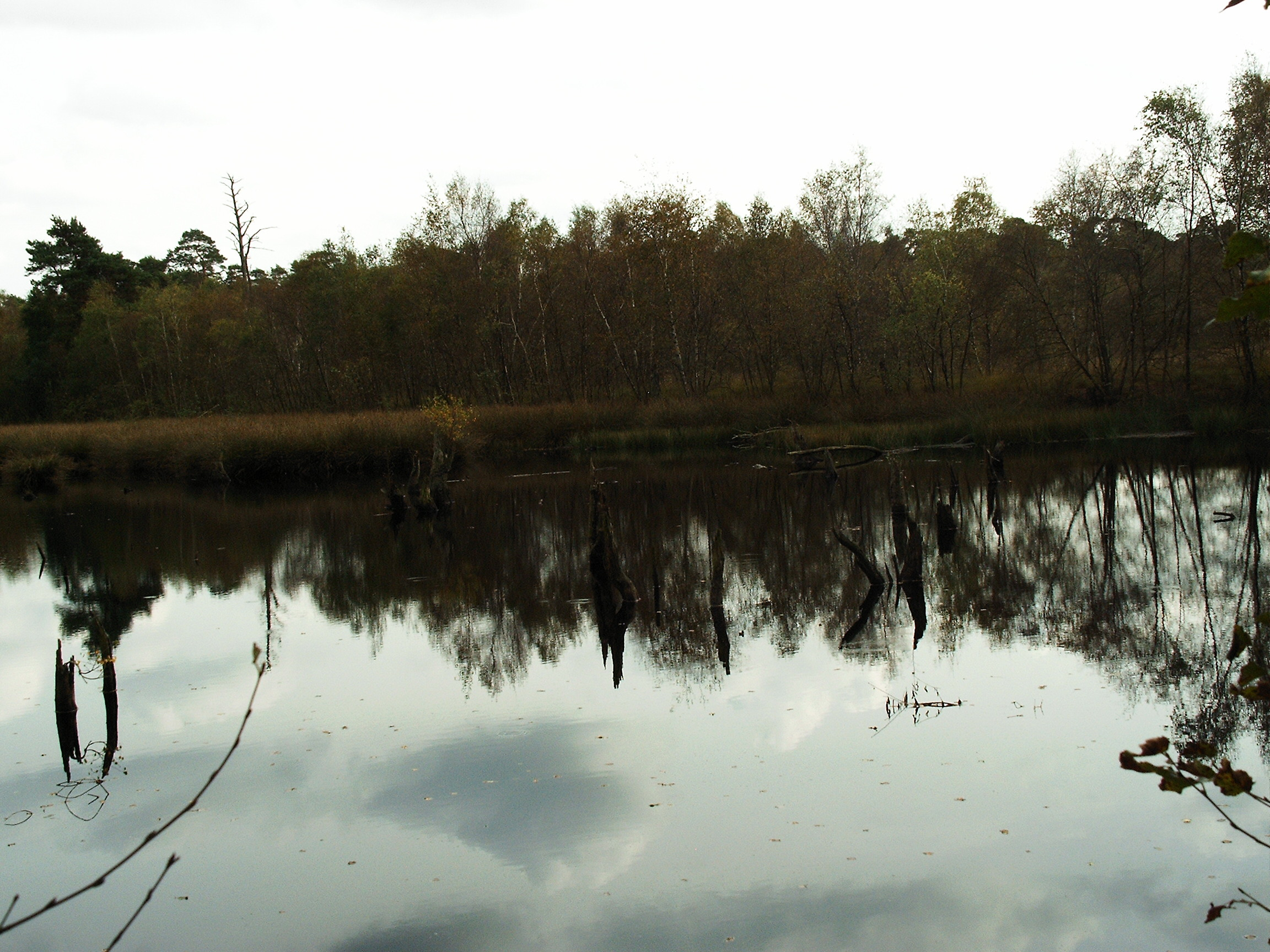
Venner Moor

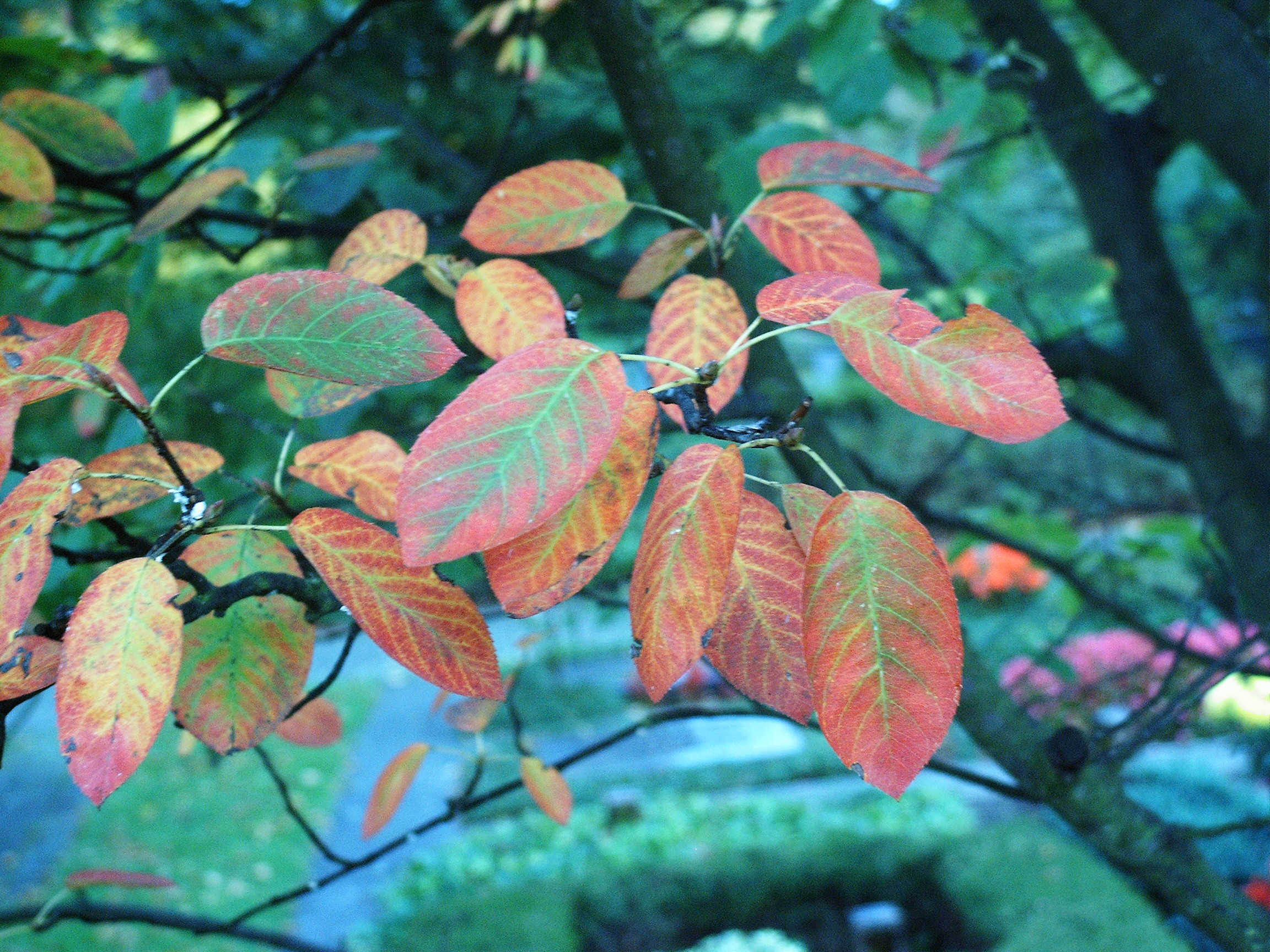
Fall in the Venner Moor

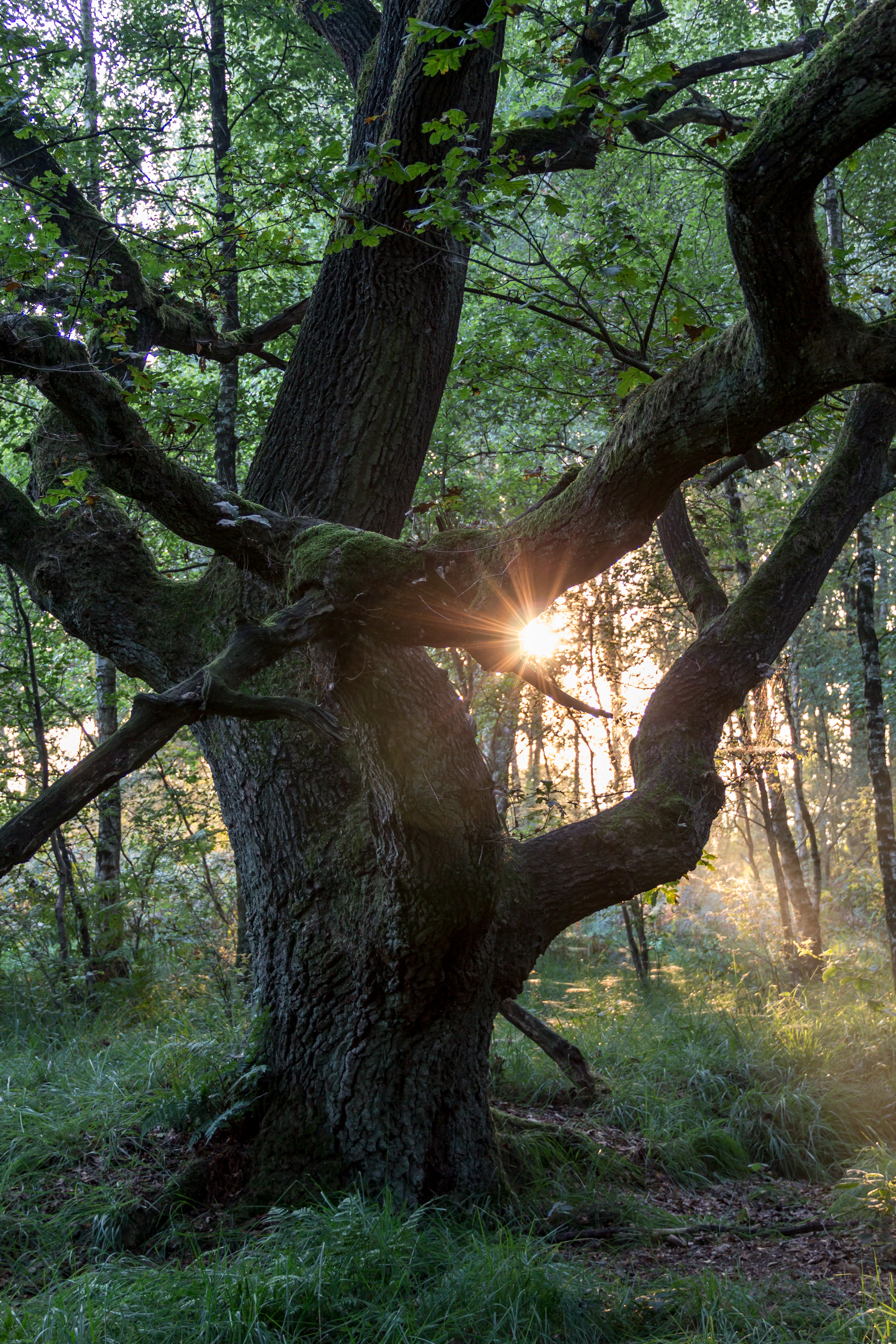
Tree in the Venner Moord

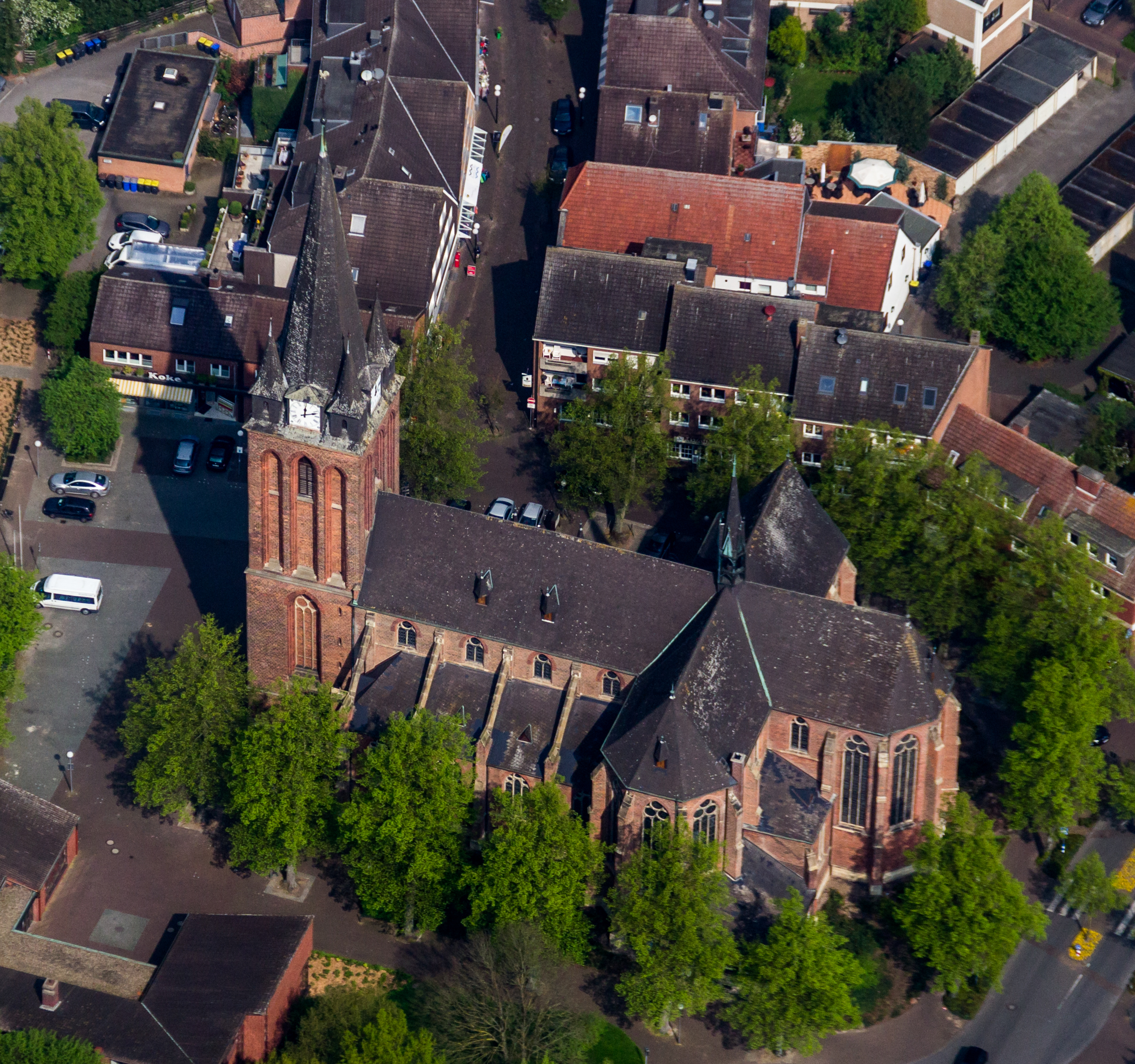
Saint Lawrence church

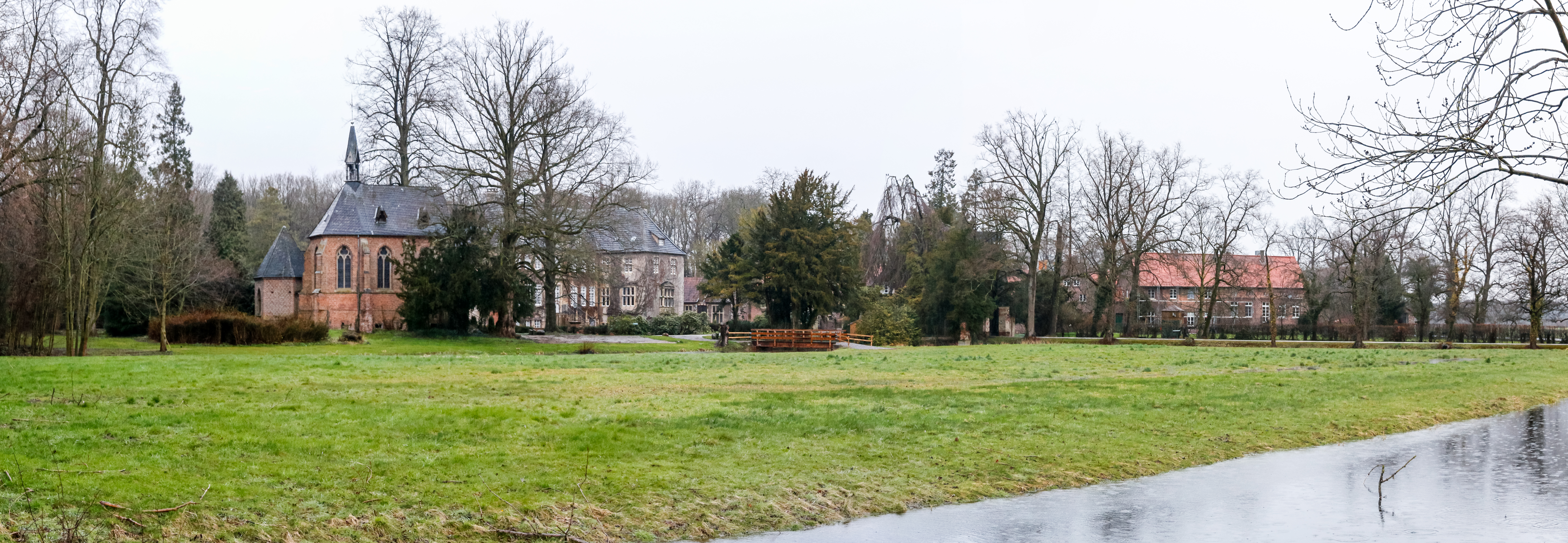
Manor Ruhr

== History ==
The first historical mentions of the villages of the municipality were as follows:

- Senden in 890
- Ottmarsbocholt in 980
- Bösensell in 1148
- Venne's in 1230

On January 1, 1975 these four formally autonomous municipalities became parts of the present municipality of Senden.

== Population ==
Historical population

Year	Pop.	±% p.a.
1965	8,947	—
1970	10,101	+2.46%
1975	12,981	+5.15%
1980	14,416	+2.12%
1985	15,405	+1.34%
1990	15,341	−0.08%
1995	18,796	+4.15%

Year	Pop.	±% p.a.
2000	19,562	+0.80%
2005	20,529	+0.97%
2010	20,778	+0.24%
2015	20,455	−0.31%
2020	20,358	−0.10%
2025	21,000	+0.62%

Source: Landesdatabank Nordrhein-Westfalen

== Politics ==
The major political party is the CDU (19 seats in the municipality council). Other parties in the council are the SPD (8 seats), Green Party (4 seats) and the FDP (3 seats). The mayor is Sebastian Täger, who does not belong to a party.

== Transport ==
Near Bösensell there is an exit to the Autobahn A 43.

Two important bus lines serve the municipality. A local bus line connects the villages of Bösensell, Senden and Ottmarsbocholt. A high speed bus line, which connects Münster and Lüdinghausen via the A43 runs through Senden.

There is a small harbour at the Dortmund-Ems Canal.

The village of Bösensell has a railway station at the line between Münster and Essen.

== Education ==
The municipality of Senden has seven schools:

- Bösensell:
  - 1 primary school
- Ottmarsbocholt:
  - 1 primary School
- Senden:
  - 2 primary schools
  - 1 Hauptschule
  - 1 Realschule
  - 1 Gymnasium
