= Nottuln =

- Municipality
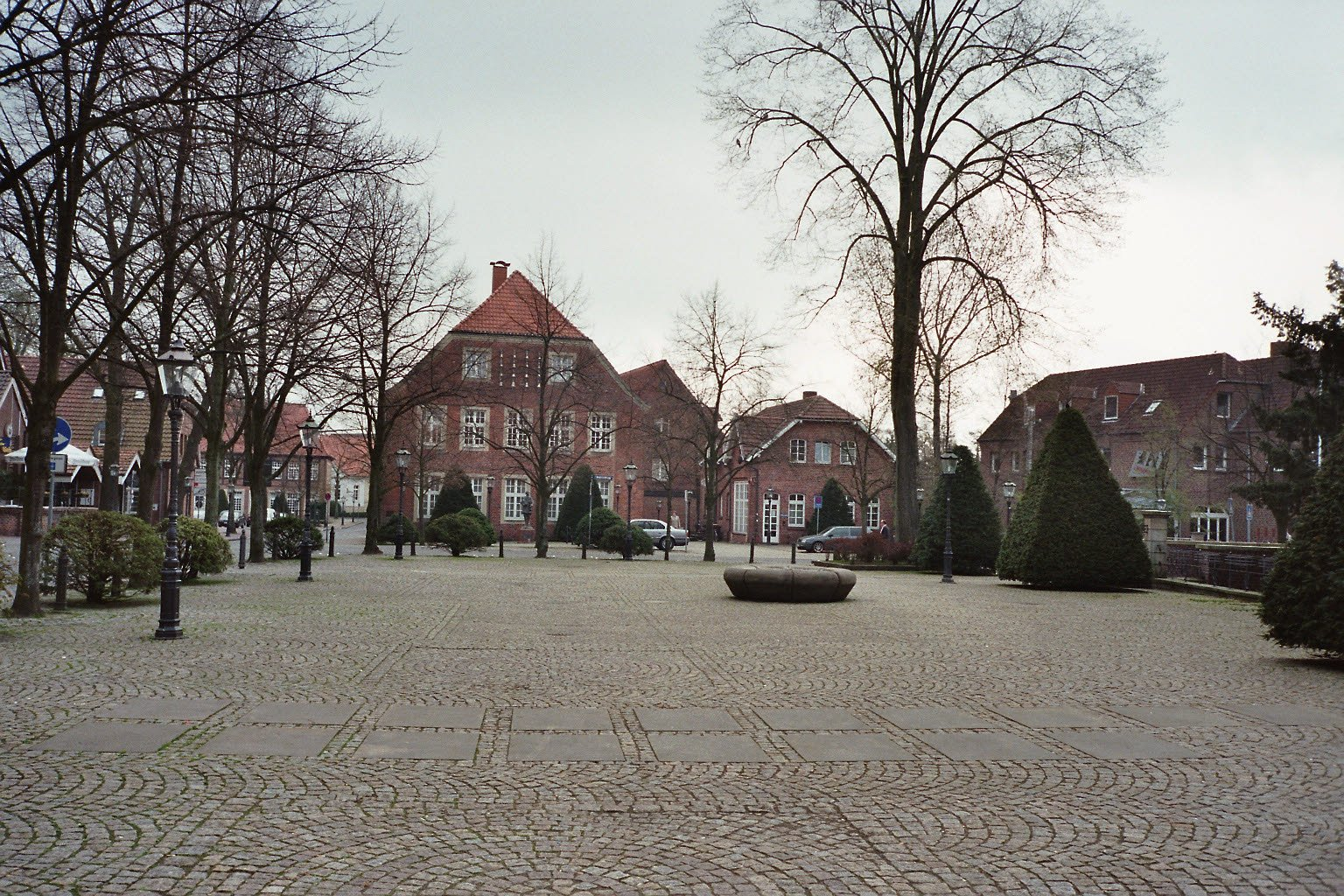
- Center of Nottuln

- Flag Coat of arms

- Location of Nottuln within Coesfeld district
- Interactive map of Nottuln
- Location within Germany Location within North Rhine-Westphalia
- Coordinates: 51°55′N 7°17′E
- Country: Germany
- State: North Rhine-Westphalia
- Admin. region: Münster
- District: Coesfeld
- Subdivisions: 4

Government
  - Mayor (2020–25): Dietmar Thönnes-Richard

Area
  - Total: 85.67 km^{2} (33.08 sq mi)
- Elevation: 59–186 m (194–610 ft)

Population (2025-12-31)
  - Total: 20,003
  - Density: 233.5/km^{2} (604.7/sq mi)
- Time zone: UTC+01:00 (CET)
  - Summer (DST): UTC+02:00 (CEST)
- Postal codes: 48301
- Dialling codes: 02502; 02509 (Appelhülsen, Schapdetten)
- Vehicle registration: COE
- Website: www.nottuln.de

Nottuln (German pronunciation: [ˈnɔtʊln]; Low German: Notteln) is a municipality in the district of Coesfeld in the state of North Rhine-Westphalia, Germany.

== Geography ==
Nottuln is situated in the Baumberge, approx. 20 km west of Münster.

=== Neighbouring municipalities ===
- Billerbeck
- Havixbeck
- Senden, North Rhine-Westphalia
- Dülmen
- Coesfeld

=== Division of the municipality ===
The municipality consists of 4 districts

- Nottuln
- Appelhülsen (including Nottuln-Appelhülsen station)
- Schapdetten
- Darup

== History ==
Original settlement of the Nottuln area dates back to about 4000 BC. The name of Nottuln originates from Nutlon, which is probably early German for "nut wood". A church was founded in 860 by Liudger, as well as the first convent in Westphalia.

After a destructive fire in 1748, the parish church and surrounding convent district were rebuilt in baroque style by Johann Conrad Schlaun.

== Population ==
Historical population

Year	Pop.	±% p.a.
1965	10,144	—
1970	10,631	+0.94%
1975	11,304	+1.24%
1980	13,103	+3.00%
1985	14,516	+2.07%
1990	15,748	+1.64%
1995	17,823	+2.51%

Year	Pop.	±% p.a.
2000	19,391	+1.70%
2005	20,270	+0.89%
2010	19,871	−0.40%
2015	19,436	−0.44%
2020	19,636	+0.20%
2025	20,003	+0.37%

Source: Landesdatabank Nordrhein-Westfalen

== Transport ==
Nottuln is on the Bundesautobahn 43 and Nottuln-Appelhülsen station in the nearby town of Appelhülsen is on the Wanne-Eickel–Hamburg railway, connecting to Münster. Nottuln has bus lines that reach out to Coesfeld, Darup, and Roxel with the R62/3; Billerbeck and Appelhuelsen with the T85; and Münster with the S60. There are also many bike paths as Nottuln is on many of the Baumberger bike routes.

== Points of interest ==
- Longinus Tower

== Notable people ==
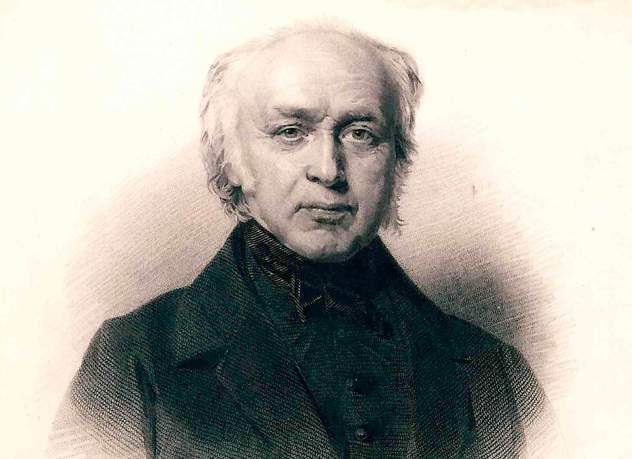
Clemens Maria Franz von Bönninghausen

- Christian Baumeister (born 1971), wildlife filmmaker
- Clemens Maria Franz von Bönninghausen (1785-1864), jurist, homeopath, landowner of Haus Darup and first district councilor of the Coesfeld district
- Hermann Busenbaum (1600-1668), Jesuit theologian
- Franz Wilhelm Darup (1756-1836), religious author and captain of honor
- Norbert van Heyst, (born 1944), former commander of the 1. German-Dutch Corps in Münster
