= Ina Lehmann =

German association football player (born 1990)

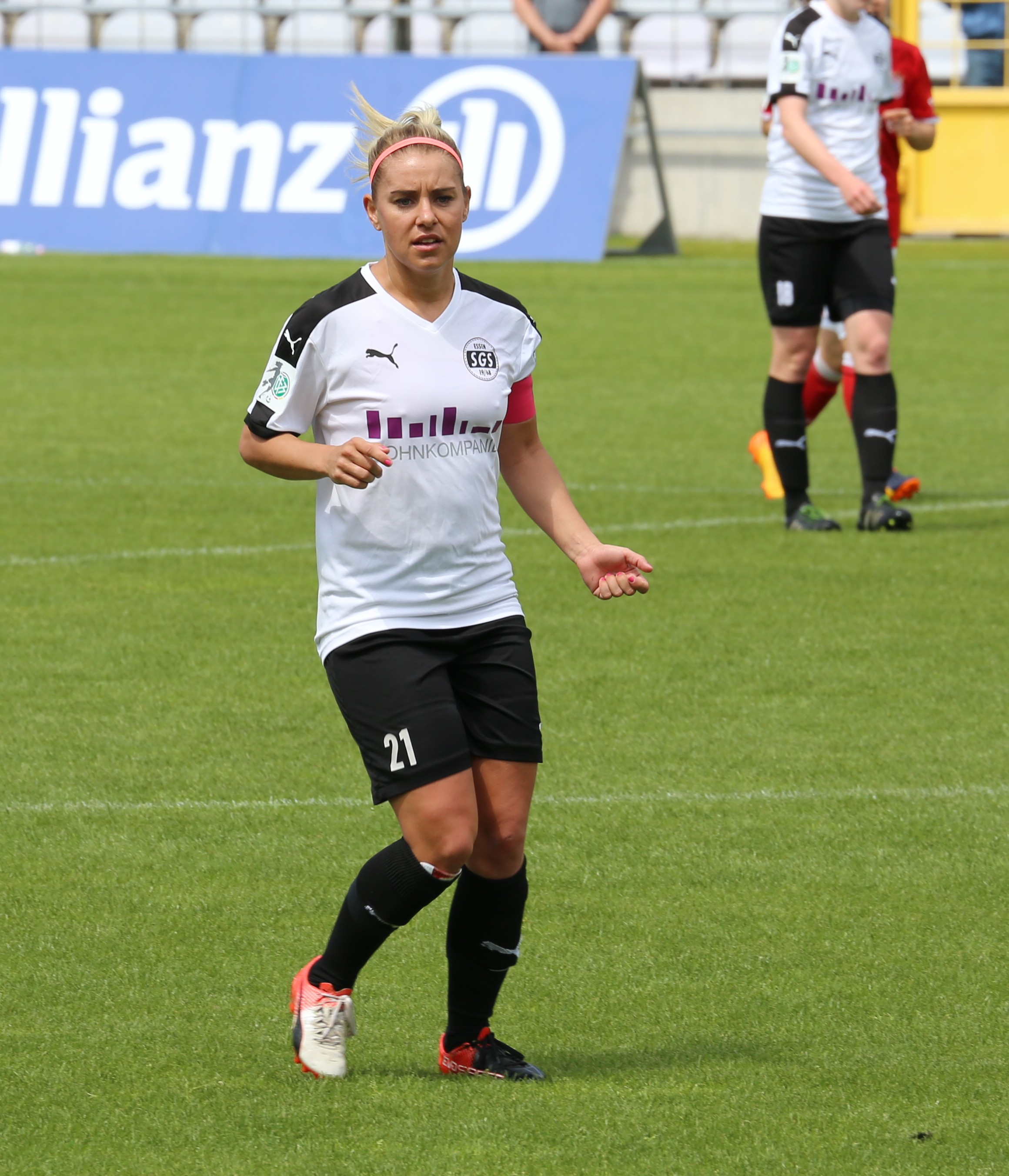
- Lehmann playing for SGS Essen in 2016

Personal information
- Date of birth: 5 February 1990 (age 36)
- Place of birth: Coesfeld, Germany
- Height: 1.58 m (5 ft 2 in)
- Positions: Defensive midfielder; defender

Ina Lehmann (born 5 February 1990) is a retired German footballer who played as a defensive midfielder and defender for Frauen-Bundesliga club SGS Essen.

== Club career ==
She was born in Coesfeld, Lehmann began her youth career with Westfalia Osterwick and SuS Darfeld before joining FFC Heike Rheine, where she made her Frauen-Bundesliga debut during the 2006–07 season. After playing for SuS Concordia Flaesheim, she signed with SGS Essen (then SG Essen-Schönebeck) in July 2009.

Lehmann spent 11 seasons with SGS Essen, making over 150 league appearances and reaching the DFB-Pokal Frauen final in 2014 and 2020. She retired from competitive football following the 2019 – 20 season.
