= Billerbeck =

- Town
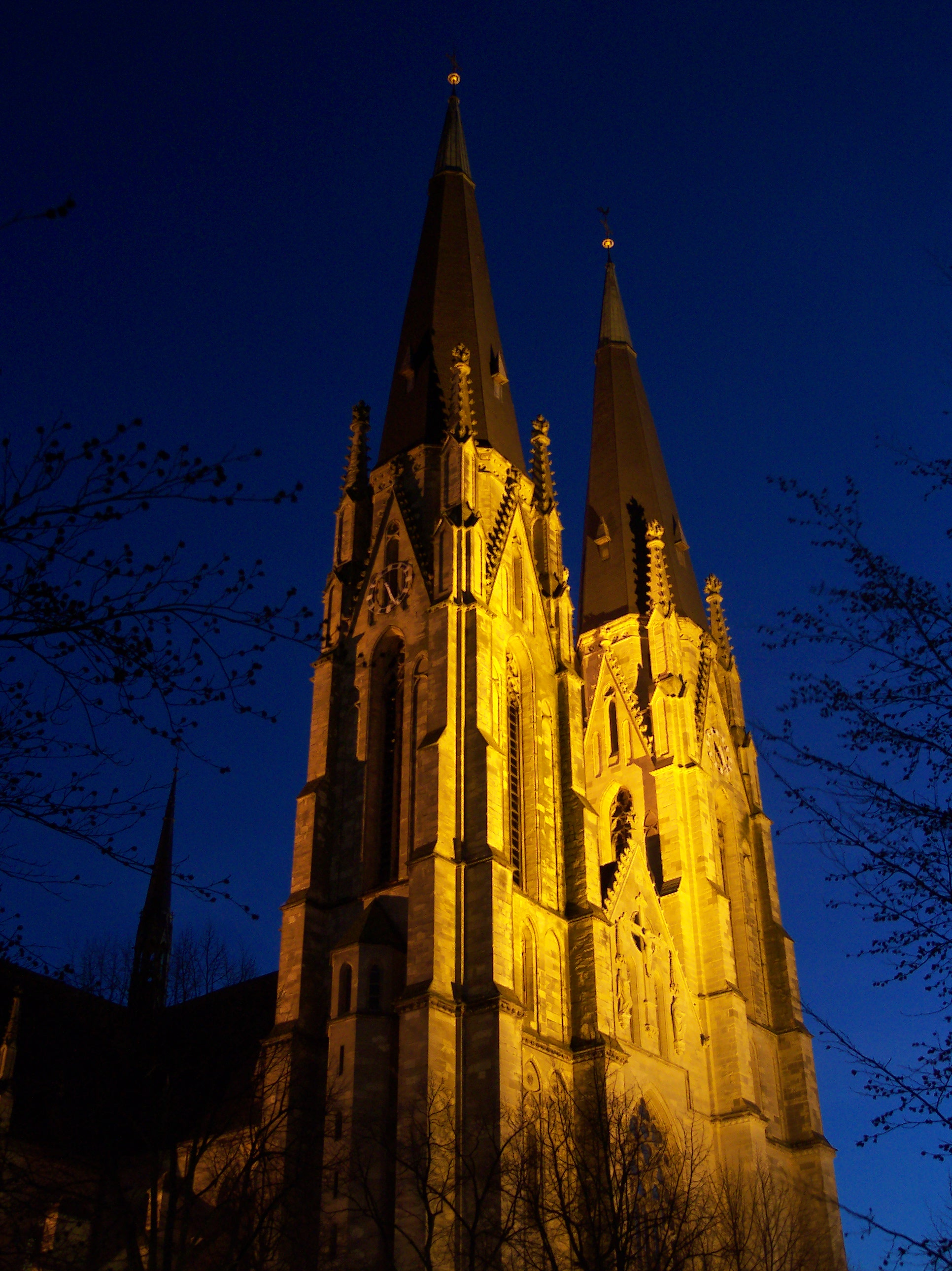
- St. Ludgerus Church

- Flag Coat of arms

- Location of Billerbeck within Coesfeld district
- Interactive map of Billerbeck
- Location within Germany Location within North Rhine-Westphalia
- Coordinates: 51°58′45″N 7°17′42″E
- Country: Germany
- State: North Rhine-Westphalia
- Admin. region: Münster
- District: Coesfeld
- Subdivisions: 3

Government
  - Mayor (2025–30): Marco Lennertz (CDU)

Area
  - Total: 91.37 km^{2} (35.28 sq mi)
- Elevation: 106 m (348 ft)

Population (2025-12-31)
  - Total: 12,019
  - Density: 131.5/km^{2} (340.7/sq mi)
- Time zone: UTC+01:00 (CET)
  - Summer (DST): UTC+02:00 (CEST)
- Postal codes: 48727
- Dialling codes: 02543
- Vehicle registration: COE
- Website: www.billerbeck.de

Billerbeck (German pronunciation: [ˈbɪlɐbɛk]; Westphalian: Billerbiëk) is a town in the district of Coesfeld in North Rhine-Westphalia in Germany.

== Geography ==
=== Neighbor towns/cities ===
Billerbeck has boundaries to Rosendahl, Laer, Altenberge, Havixbeck, Nottuln and Coesfeld.

=== City Districts ===
- Stadt Billerbeck,
- Kirchspiel Billerbeck (until 1969)
- Beerlage (until 1969)

=== Growth due to law acts ===
On July 1, 1969 the town's surrounding areas: Alstätte, Bockelsdorf, Bombeck, Dörholt, Gantweg, Gerleve, Hamern, !'Lutum', Osthellen, Osthellermark and Westhellen - each part of former "Kirchspiel Aulendorf", Esking, Langenhorst und Temming - each part of former Beerlage - were merged with Billerbeck.

== Population ==
Historical population

Year	Pop.	±% p.a.
1965	8,557	—
1970	9,066	+1.16%
1975	9,321	+0.56%
1980	9,521	+0.43%
1985	9,565	+0.09%
1990	9,991	+0.88%
1995	10,719	+1.42%

Year	Pop.	±% p.a.
2000	11,307	+1.07%
2005	11,560	+0.44%
2010	11,522	−0.07%
2015	11,593	+0.12%
2020	11,538	−0.10%
2025	12,019	+0.82%

Source: Landesdatabank Nordrhein-Westfalen

== Politics ==
The current mayor of Billerbeck is Marco Lennertz of the CDU who has been serving as mayor since 2025. In the 2025 local elections he was elected with 57% of the vote.

=== City council ===
After the 2025 local elections, the Beverungen city council is composed as follows:

Party	Votes	%	+/-	Seats	+/-
Christian Democratic Union (CDU)	3,684	52.4	▲5.4	14	▲2
Social Democratic Party (SPD)	1,314	18.7	▲0.9	5	±0
Alliance 90/The Greens (Grüne)	1,304	18.5	▼6.3	5	▼1
Family Party of Germany (FAMILIE)	413	5.9	▲1.3	1	±0
Free Democratic Party (FDP)	317	4.5	▼1.3	1	▼1
Valid votes	7,032	98.2			
Invalid votes	130	1.8			
Total	7,162	100.0		26	±0
Electorate/voter turnout	9,635	74.3			
Source: City of Billerbeck

=== Coat of Arms ===
The Coat of Arms shows the three rivers Berkel, Haulingbach and Lilienbeck in silver on blue background. Its origin can be traced back to the medieval Knights of Billerbeck.

=== Sister city ===
- Englewood, Ohio

== Culture and Sights ==
=== Theatre ===
In 1950 the citizens Alex Hesselmann and Bernhard Engbers established the open air-theatre of Billerbeck. It is well known for its high class acting, given that there are only non-professional actors.

=== Museums ===
The Kolvenburg comprises building parts from the 15th and 16th centuries. This kind of mansion with its half-hipp roof is a typical housing of the lower nobility of the Münsterland. Today it is the cultural centre of the district of Coesfeld showing changing exhibitions.

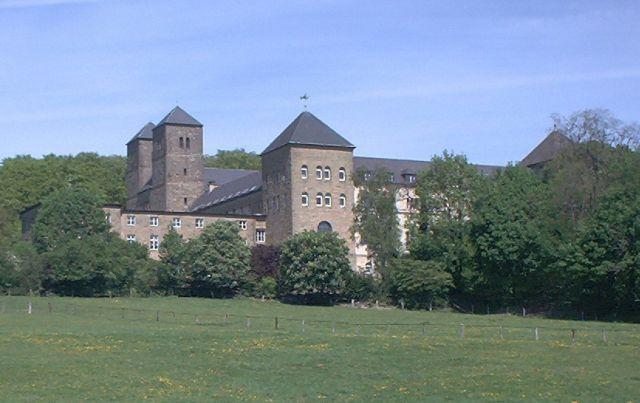
Gerleve Abbey

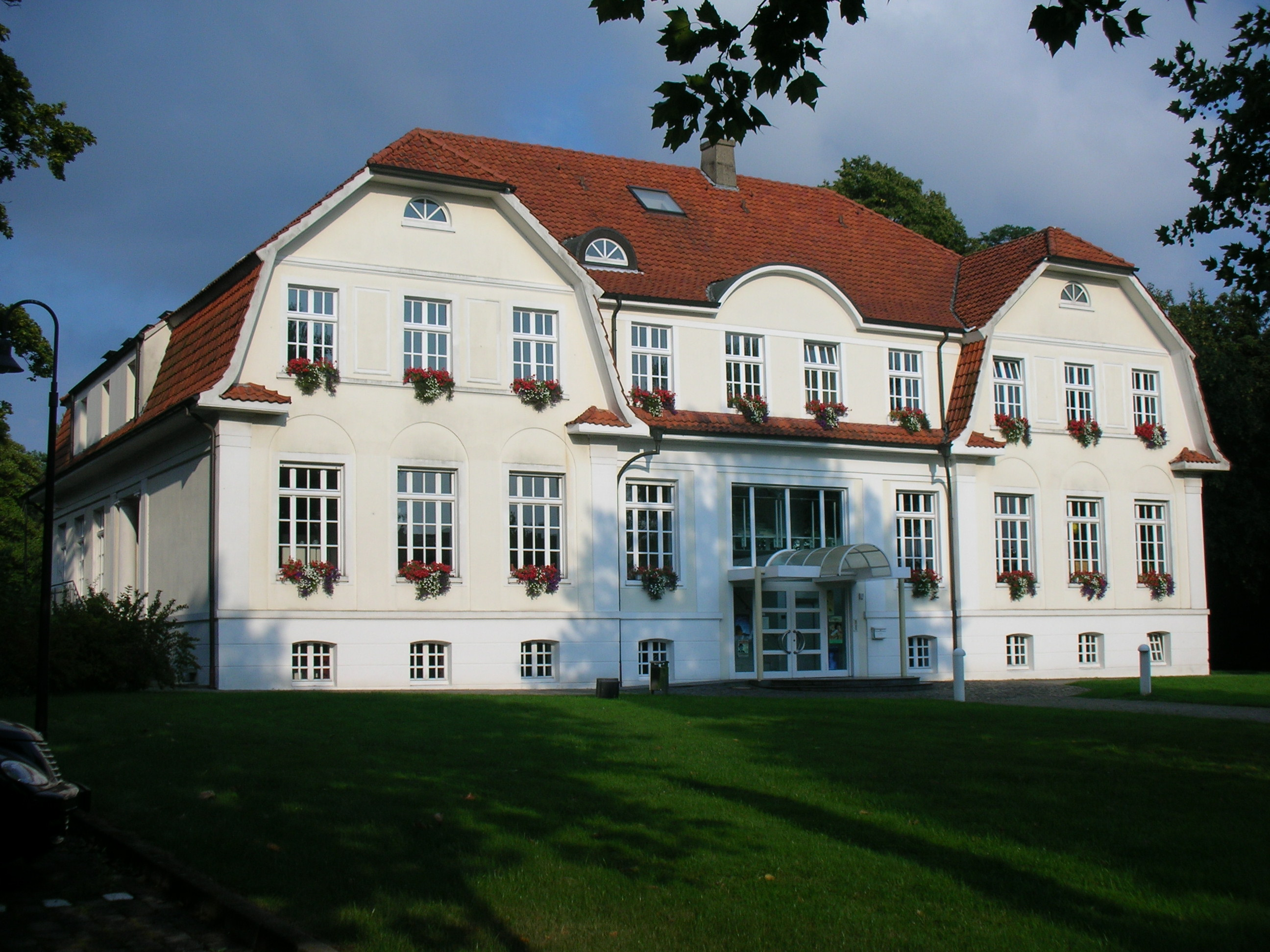
Alte Landwirtschaftsschule

=== Buildings ===
- St. Ludgerus Church
- Cath. Church of St. Johannis
- Kolvenburg
- Town Hall, Markt 1. Neogothic building with blending made of sandstone, 1891, erected by Hilger Hertel. Enlargement in 1948/49.
- Haus Beckebans
- Richthof
- Gerleve Abbey
- Haus Hameren (Inh: Baron Twickel zu Degenhart)
- Former residence of the Arch Deacon of Billerbeck, Johanniskirchplatz 11. L-formed massive building with hipped roof, in earlier times surrounded by water. The oldest parts were erected in the early 16th century and enlarged in 1679.
- Ludgerus-fountain
- Marien chapel Aulendorf
- Evang. church centre
- "Alte Landwirtschaftsschule" (former agricultural college), Billerbeck's cultural center
- Ludgerus-Stift, an old hospital now used as old people's home
- Old buildings that were lived in
  - street: MÜNSTERSTR. 4.: 16th century
  - MÜNSTERSTR. 8.: 16th century or earlier.
  - MÜNSTERSTR. 16.: the northern part and the back are from the 16th century. Inside there is a chimney/fireplace from 1693 in a late renaissance style
  - MÜNSTERSTR. 25.: The backhouse dates to the 16th century.
- The old church of St. Johannis (from 1234) is completely surrounded by simple styled half-timbered buildings (little storage buildings). The oldest date from the late medieval age but have been re-arranged several times. Street: JOHANNSIKIRCHHOF 2, 1513 d. - Nr. 7, 1492 d.

=== Parks ===
- Longinusturm in the "treehills" Baumbergen
- Berkel-Auen (the river Berkel starts here)
- Leisure- and Sports Centre Helker Berg

== Economy and Infrastructure ==
=== Traffic ===
Billerbeck can be reached by car via the autobahn. From north-east on autobahn A1 at interchange "Havixbeck/Billerbeck", from south on autobahn A43 at interchange "Nottuln/Billerbeck", from west on autobahn A31 at interchange "Coesfeld".

==== Public Transport ====
Billerbeck is located on the train line from Münster to Coesfeld, the so-called "tree hills line" ("Baumbergebahn"). The modernised station building offers a café for cultural Events and a bicycle rental station.

A further train station in Billerbeck is located in Lutum, which is a countryside train station. The town of Billerbeck is part of the public transport association of the Münsterland VGM. Therefore, some bus lines also stop at Billerbeck, connecting the town to its neighbouring towns and cities.

=== Business ===
The biggest employer in Billerbeck is the company Dr. Suwelack founded by Wolfgang Suwelack and which employs 410 staff. It is working on the sector of nutrition production and skin care. It is also operating one of the most advanced and biggest nutrition shockfrosting sites in Europe. A medium-sized metal-working industry can be found there as well as several trading companies, and service industry (e.g. 7 haircutters, 3 undertakers and a filmproduction company).

Billerbeck is an important centre of tourism as it is only half-an-hour away for the 7 million people of the Rhein-Ruhr-Area and it is also a place of pilgrimage as Ludger, the first bishop of Münster, died there in the year 809. Last but not least cycling is very popular in the region which is manifested in 800 kilometres of bicycle and pedestrian streets. For these reasons the gastronomy is well developed and offers a great variety related to the city's number of inhabitants.

== Education ==
In Billerbeck there are the Grundschule (basic school - school years 1–4) at two locations, the Realschule (secondary modern school/junior high - 5–10) and a Hauptschule (secondary school - 5–10). 5 Kindergartens and 2 day care units are operated in the city.

== Religion ==
In Billerbeck there are Roman Catholic and Lutheran churches present.

The Catholic Pfarr- und Propsteigemeinde St. Johann / St. Ludgerus Billerbeck has its roots in the 8th century.

Ahead of Billerbeck there is the abbey of Benedictine- St. Joseph at Billerbeck-Gerleve. Part of the Beuron congregation and since 1999 led by prior Pius Engelbert O.S.B., the abbey contains a retreat, a youth education unit, and a religious book store.

The Lutheran church centre (Protestant) "Vom guten Hirten" (of the good shepherd) in Billerbeck is a modern style church with affiliated centre of parish.

== Literature ==
- Westfälischer Städteatlas; Band: VI; 1 Teilband. Im Auftrage der Historischen Kommission für Westfalen und mit Unterstützung des Landschaftsverbandes Westfalen-Lippe, hrsg. von Heinz Stoob † und Wilfried Ehbrecht. Stadtmappe Billerbeck, Author: Peter Ilisch. ISBN 978-3-89115-145-7; Dortmund-Altenbeken, 1999.

Peter Ilisch, Zur Siedlungsgenese von Billerbeck. Westfälische Zeitschrift 129, 1979, S. 9-56. Peter Ilisch, Zum Erscheinungsbild münsterländischer Kirchhöfe vor 1800 - Das Beispiel St. Johann zu Billerbeck. Geschichtsblätter des Kreises Coesfeld 4, 1979, S. 114–131. Peter Ilisch, Die Vikarien zu Billerbeck. Geschichtsblätter des Kreises Coesfeld 28, 2003, S. 1-25.

== Clubs, societies, groups, institutions ==
- DJK-VfL Billerbeck (sports club - football, tennis, athletics etc.)
- Katholische Landjugend Bewegung Billerbeck (Catholic youth movement billerbeck)
- Bürgerschützenverein Aulendorf
- Capellengemeinde-Aulendorf
- Freilichtbühne Billerbeck
- Förderverein Domorgel Billerbeck
- Förderverein Mahnmal
- Deutsches Rotes Kreuz Ortverein Billerbeck
- KJG-Ferienwerk Billerbeck
- Kolpingsfamilie Billerbeck
- Suwelack-Stiftung
- Tennisclub Billerbeck
- Sister-City-Club Billerbeck

== Personalities from Billerbeck ==
- Josef Suwelack (1850–1929), entrepreneur and pioneer
- Helmut Elfring (born 1933), politician
- Margret Mergen (born 1961), politician (CDU), Lord Mayor of Baden-Baden since 2014
