= Havixbeck =

- Municipality
- Coat of arms

- Location of Havixbeck within Coesfeld district
- Interactive map of Havixbeck
- Location within Germany Location within North Rhine-Westphalia
- Coordinates: 51°48′40″N 7°25′00″E
- Country: Germany
- State: North Rhine-Westphalia
- Admin. region: Münster
- District: Coesfeld
- Subdivisions: 2

Government
  - Mayor (2020–25): Jörn Möltgen (Greens)

Area
  - Total: 53.17 km^{2} (20.53 sq mi)
- Elevation: 90 m (300 ft)

Population (2025-12-31)
  - Total: 12,280
  - Density: 231.0/km^{2} (598.2/sq mi)
- Time zone: UTC+01:00 (CET)
  - Summer (DST): UTC+02:00 (CEST)
- Postal codes: 48329
- Dialling codes: 0 25 07
- Vehicle registration: COE
- Website: www.havixbeck.de

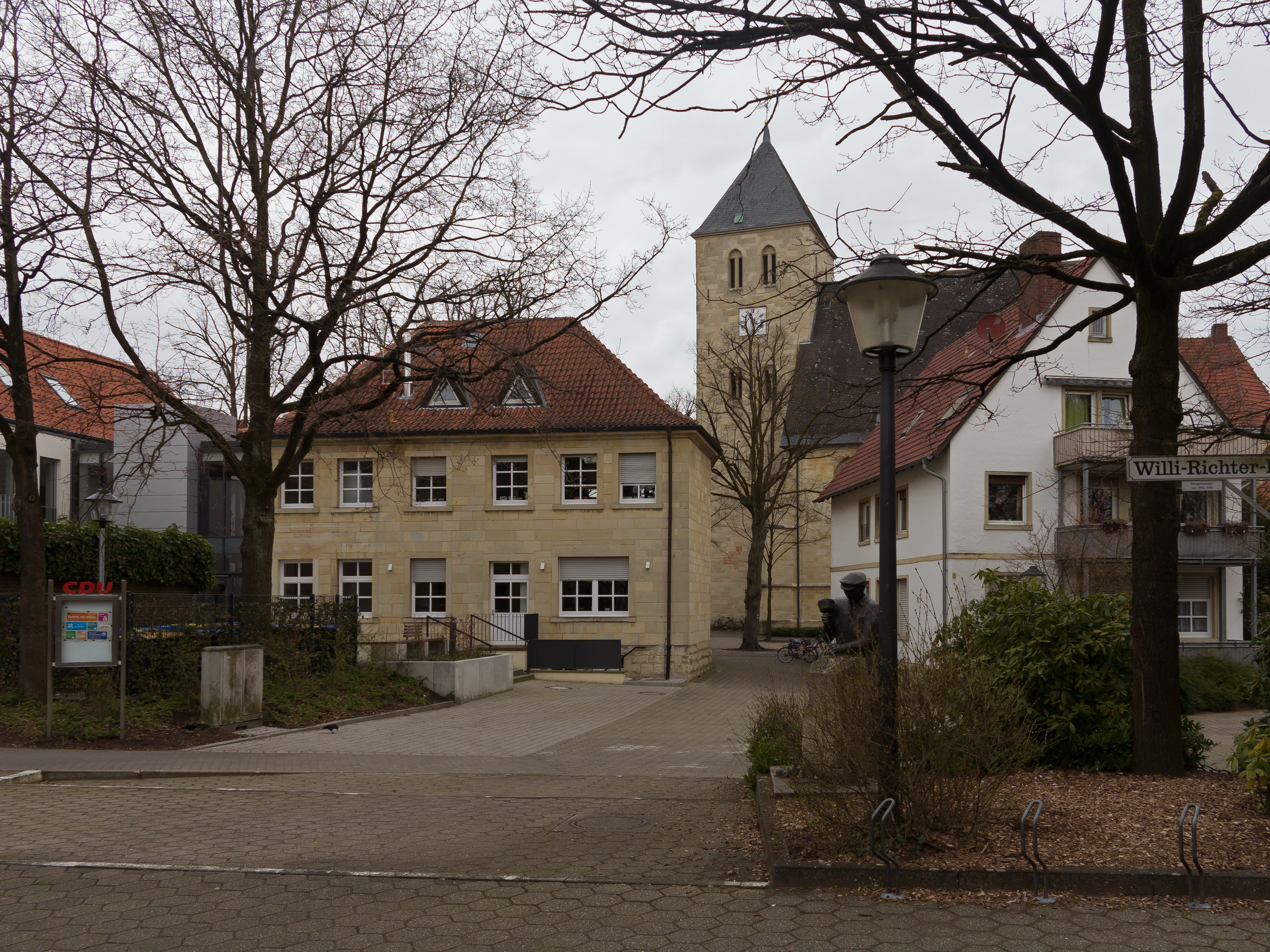
Sculpture (der Steinhauer) with church (Pfarrkirche Sankt Dionysius) in background

Havixbeck (German pronunciation: [ˈhaːvɪksˌbɛk]; Westphalian: Havkesbierk or Havkesbieck) is a municipality situated on the north-east edge of the Baumberge in the district of Coesfeld, in northern North Rhine-Westphalia, Germany. It is located approximately 15 km west of Münster.

== Geography ==
=== Geographical Location ===
Havixbeck is located on the fringes of the Baumberge, with 187 m the highest elevations of the Münsterland. West of the town emanates the spring of Münstersche Aa which, after passing Münster, converges in the Ems River near Greven.

=== Adjacent municipalities ===
Havixbeck borders (clockwise, starting north) on Altenberge (District of Steinfurt), the city of Münster, as well as Senden, Nottuln and Billerbeck (District of Coesfeld).

=== Division of the town ===
The district of Hohenholte has a population of about 1,000 residents. In the parish church of St. George, a former monastery church, there is a crucifixion relief from the period around 1530/40 as well as the epitaph of the prioress Richmond Warendorp († 1503), both created by the sculptor Johann Brabender from Münster.

== Population ==
Historical population

Year	Pop.	±% p.a.
1965	5,221	—
1970	5,646	+1.58%
1975	8,725	+9.10%
1980	9,318	+1.32%
1985	9,837	+1.09%
1990	10,212	+0.75%
1995	10,711	+0.96%

Year	Pop.	±% p.a.
2000	11,740	+1.85%
2005	11,919	+0.30%
2010	11,801	−0.20%
2015	11,689	−0.19%
2020	11,961	+0.46%
2025	12,280	+0.53%

Source: Landesdatabank Nordrhein-Westfalen

== Politics ==
=== Local council ===
Elections in 2014:

- CDU: 41.8%
- SPD: 26.3%
- Greens: 23.3%
- FDP: 8.6%

=== Results of local elections since 1975 ===
In the list, only political parties that received at least 2.95% of the votes in the election are listed:

Year	CDU	SPD	FDP	CBG	Greens
1975	59,2	32,4	8,5		
1979	37,5	26,1	5,4	31,0	
1984	48,0	26,6	9,1	5,9	10,1
1989	47,9	26,0	12,7		13,5
1994	49,3	26,7	7,7		16,3
1999	55,1	24,5	7,0		13,4
2004	42,6	25,6	12,0		19,8

=== Twin cities ===
Havixbeck is twinned with the following places:

- Bellegarde (Loiret), France
- (Germany) Bestensee near Berlin, Brandenburg

== Economics and infrastructure ==
The economy in Havixbeck consists mainly of small and medium-sized enterprises, mainly located in two major industrial areas.

=== Transportation ===
The road network is excellent, there are good connections to Münster, as well as to the two nearby highways A1 and A43. Havixbeck is located at the railroadtrack between Münster and Coesfeld operating hourly. The travel times is approx. 17 minutes to Münster and 22 to Coesfeld.

=== Public Facilities ===
With a little distance outside Havixbeck there is the Stift Tilbeck which offers housing and employment for people with disabilities.

=== Education ===
- Baumberge-Schule (Catholic elementary school)
- Anne-Frank comprehensive school
- Music school (in sponsorship of Jugendorchester Havixbeck e.V.)
- Adult education centre (in cooperation with Dülmen and Haltern)

== History ==
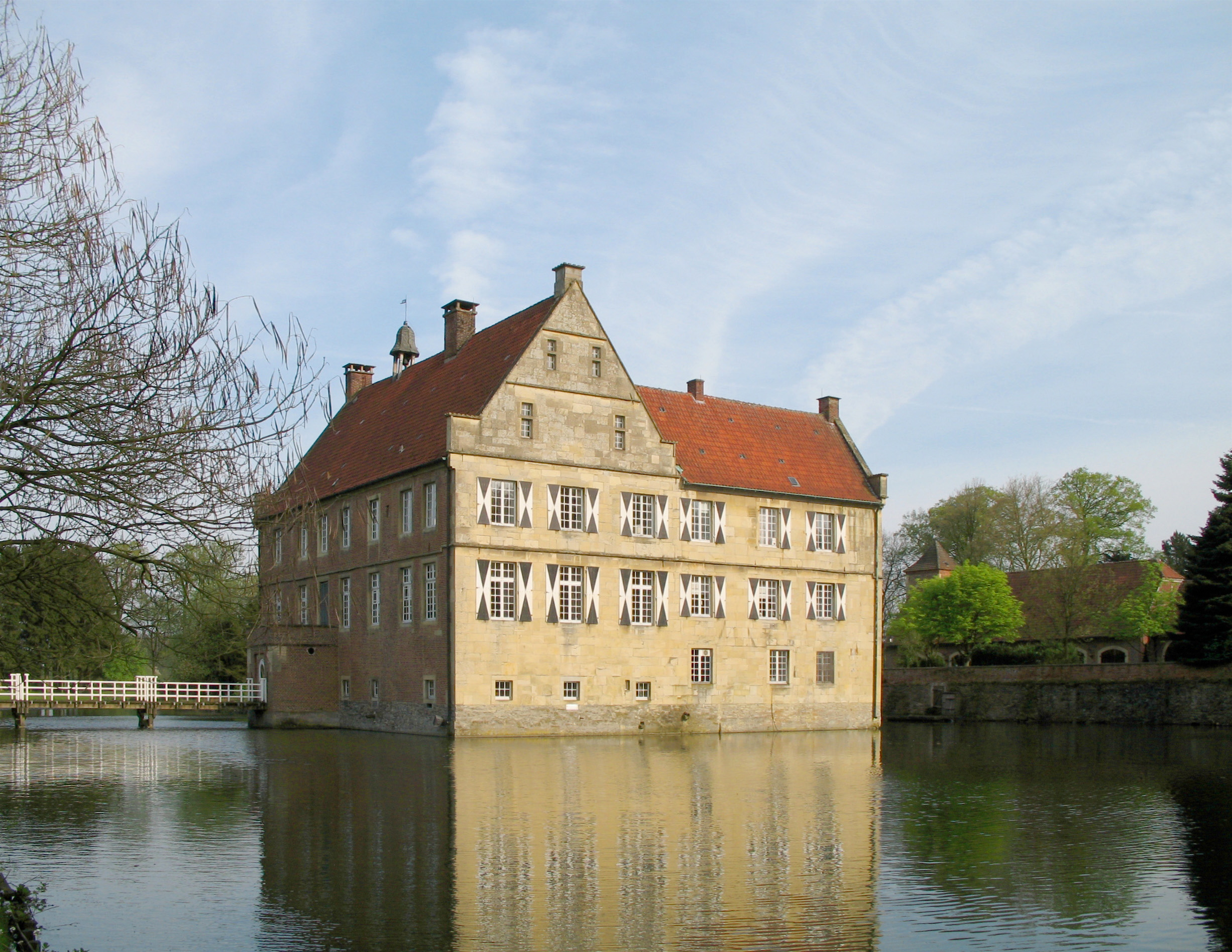
Burg Hülshoff

The German poet Annette von Droste-Hülshoff was born in the Havixbeck castlet Burg Hülshoff in 1797, where a museum with a retrospective of her work is open to the public.
