= Gerleve Abbey =

Monastery in Germany

Coordinates: 51°56′46″N 7°14′14″E

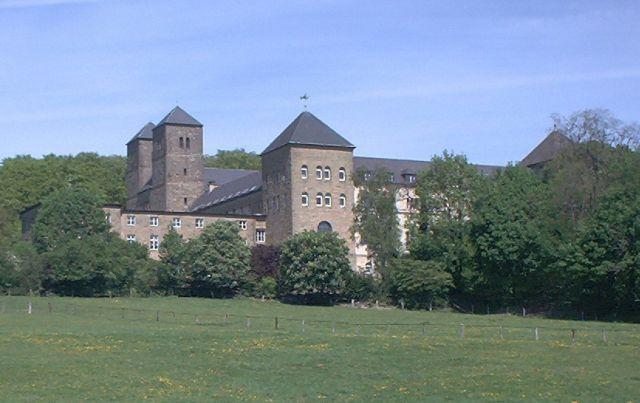
Gerleve Abbey

Gerleve Abbey (in German Kloster or Abtei Gerleve) is a monastery of the Benedictine Order situated between Coesfeld and Billerbeck in Westphalia (North Rhine-Westphalia), in Germany.

== History ==
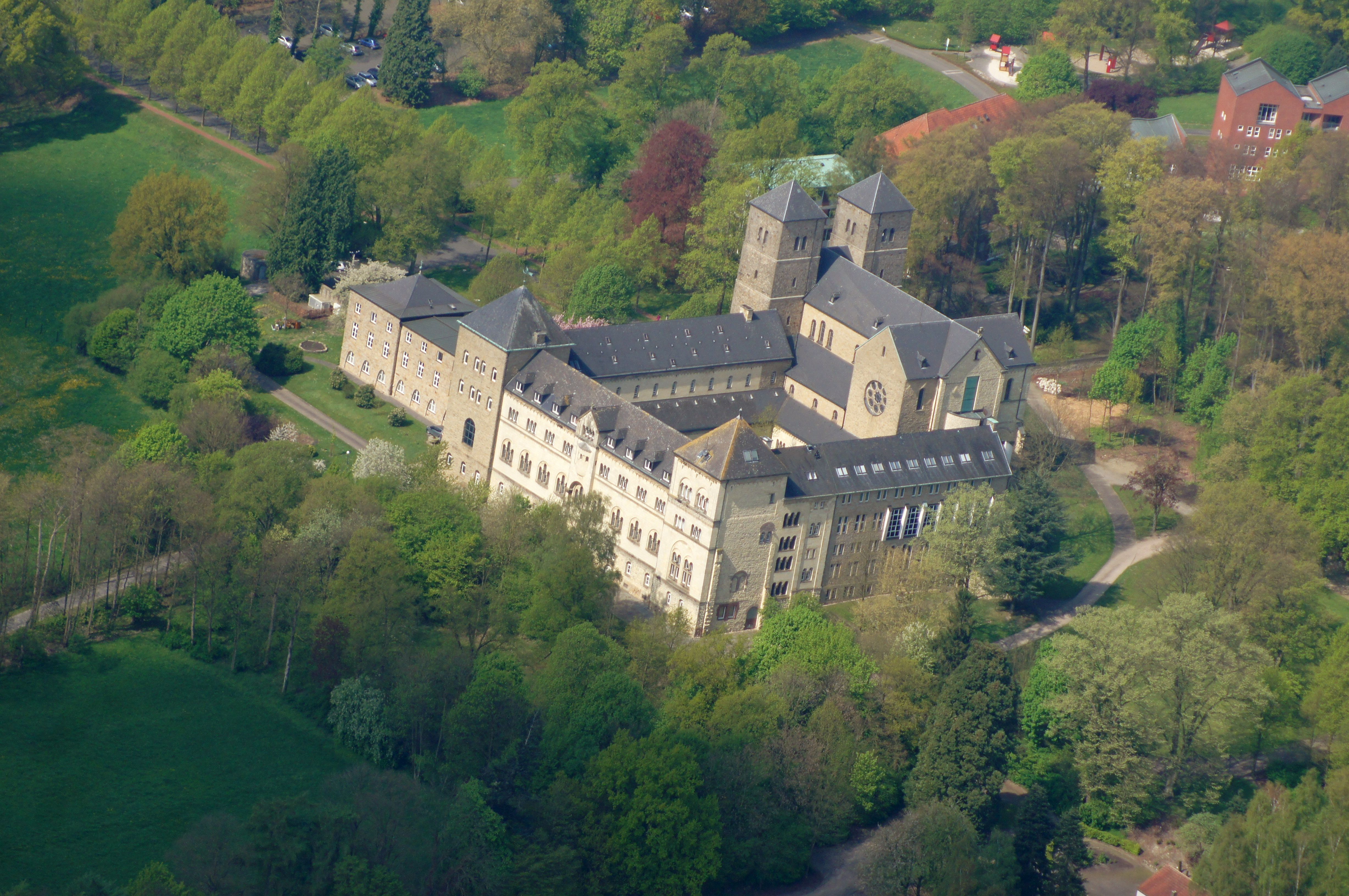
Gerleve Abbey

The community, dedicated to Saint Joseph, was founded in 1899 on the land of the Hof Wermelt, a farm given for the purpose by the Wermelt family, to the monks of Beuron Archabbey. The monks took over the farm, celebrated church services in a small house chapel and supported the pastors in the area in their work. In June 1904, the west wing of the monastery was completed and it was formally declared an abbey. The first abbot was Raphael Molitor OSB, under whose leadership, the monastery experienced rapid growth. The farm, which made a significant contribution to the support of the monks, was continuously modernized. The abbey trained apprentices in various areas.

Since 1918, Gerleve has been an important part of the "liturgical movement" in north-west Germany. At the same time, the community, which had grown in number, increased its pastoral work. The hotel built next to the monastery became the Ludgerirast retreat house. In 1928 a separate youth hostel was added. In 1936 the abbey had 100 monks.

For a time the abbey ran a small school and a boarding school in Coesfeld. Abbot Molitor attached great importance to the training of monks. Some of them became highly respected as theologians, historians or musicologists. Several took over chairs at the Benedictine College of Sant'Anselmo in Rome. While giving lectures in Münster, Edith Stein visited Gerleve at least three times.

=== World War II ===
On Sunday, July 13, 1941 the community was expelled from Westphalia by order of the National Socialists; the abbey's emphasis on Christian values was understood by both the believers and the National Socialists as resistance. When questioned, Gauleiter Meyer said that the monks of Gerleve had been found guilty of "pacifist activity and destructive criticism", and explained that the monastery was to be used to provide housing for bombed-out families and evacuees.

The monks were distributed among various ecclesiastical houses throughout Germany. Two Fathers were deported to the Dachau concentration camp. Twenty-five Gerlever monks were conscripted, eight of whom died in the war, with another two listed as missing. The National Socialists used the Ludgerirast house for the Hitler Youth, and the monastery as a maternity facility. More than 800 children were born in Gerleve. In February 1945, the Wehrmacht set up a military hospital in the monastery, which the Americans took over after the liberation. There is a graveyard in the abbey grounds, where among others, there are buried Russian prisoners of war and deceased patients from the military hospital which occupied the premises.

The monks were able to return in 1946. In addition to the retreat work, the pastoral care of young people became more and more important, for which a modern guest house was built in 1952, which was replaced in 1973 and 1984 by two new buildings.

In 1951 the community was able to establish a further monastery: Nütschau Priory (Kloster Nütschau) near Bad Oldesloe.

== Architecture ==
Ludger Wilhelm Rincklake OSB (1851 – 1927) designed the plans for the new monastery and its church. The foundation stone for the neo-Romaneaque church was laid in 1901. The typanum above the church portal, created by Bro. Tutilo Haas, was added in 1939. In 1949, the image of St. Joseph above the high altar was replaced with a mosaic of Christ by Ludwig Baur. In 1954, Baur provided a mosaic of the Annunciation for the Lady chapel.

== Present day ==
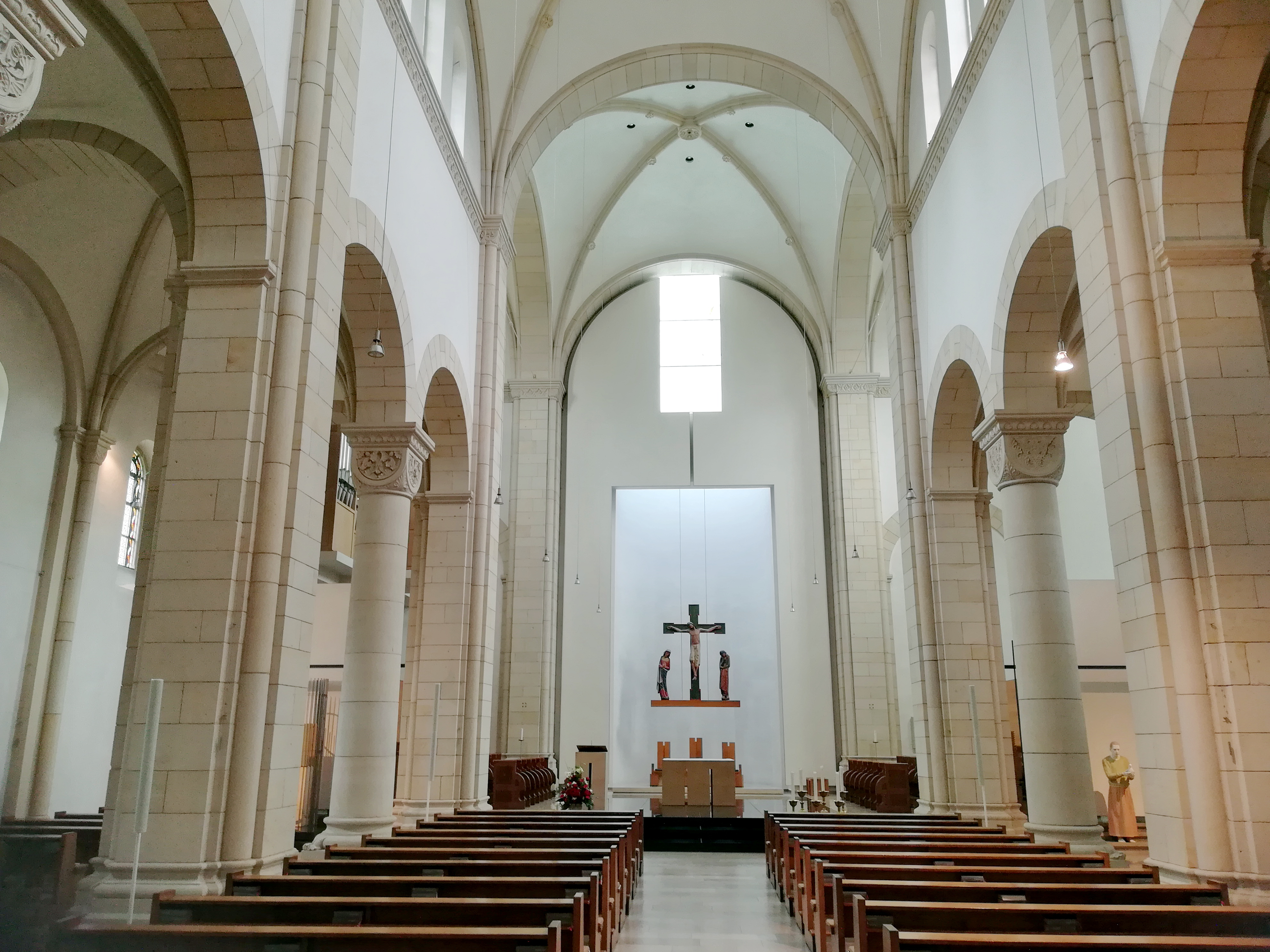
Abbey church

After the Second Vatican Council the priests found that much of the liturgy could be prayed or recited in German. However, the monks were careful to preserve the Gregorian chants. The Schola of the Benedictine Abbey Gerleve has released a CD of traditional Gregorian Chant.

Agricultural work had to be dispensed with almost entirely. Instead, new forms of pastoral and educational work emerged, such as the "Forum Gerleve". Free public lectures and concerts are held several times a year under this name. In 2015, the "Haus St. Benedikt", a youth education center was opened.

Several of the monks are active in scholarly work; others work in pastoral care and the care of guests. There are two retreat-houses close to the abbey. The Haus Ludgerirast offers room for up to 47 people taking part in different courses, seminars or retreats, of which there is a wide choice. Many people also spend their holidays near the abbey. In the Haus St. Benedikt education centre (Jugendbildungsstätte) there is room for about 80 young people from all kinds of schools, for students or for family-groups with children (there is a playground nearby). There are also rooms for groups attending one-day events (lectures, retreats, meditation groups and so on).

The abbey itself can house about 10 (male) guests making retreats or wishing to take part in the community life of work and prayer. The abbey also has a restaurant and bookstore.

As of May 2026, the community numbers 29 monks. The abbey is part of the Beuronese Congregation.

== Abbots ==
- Raphael Molitor from 1906 to 1948
- Pius Buddenborg from 1948 to 1976
- Clemens Schmeing from 1976 to 1999
- Pius Engelbert from 1999 to 2006
- Laurentius Schlieker from 2006 (elected as prior for three years, as abbot since 2009) to 2020
- Andreas Werner since 2020

== Sources ==
- Albert, Marcel: 100 Jahre Benediktinerabtei Gerleve, Münster: Aschendorff-Verlag. ISBN 3-402-05486-8
- Pius Engelbert (Ed.): Saeculum. Zeit und Welt. 100 Jahre Abtei Gerleve, Münster: Dialogverlag, 2004. - ISBN 3-933144-93-0
