= Charlotte Quik =

German politician (born 1982)

Member of the Landtag of North Rhine-Westphalia
- Incumbent
- Assumed office 1 June 2017

Personal details
- Born: 30 October 1982 (age 43) Coesfeld
- Party: Christian Democratic Union (since 2008)

Charlotte Quik (née Bottermann; born 30 October 1982 in Coesfeld) is a German politician serving as a member of the Landtag of North Rhine-Westphalia since 2017. She has served as chairwoman of the Christian Democratic Union in Wesel since 2021.
