= Coesfeld =

- Town
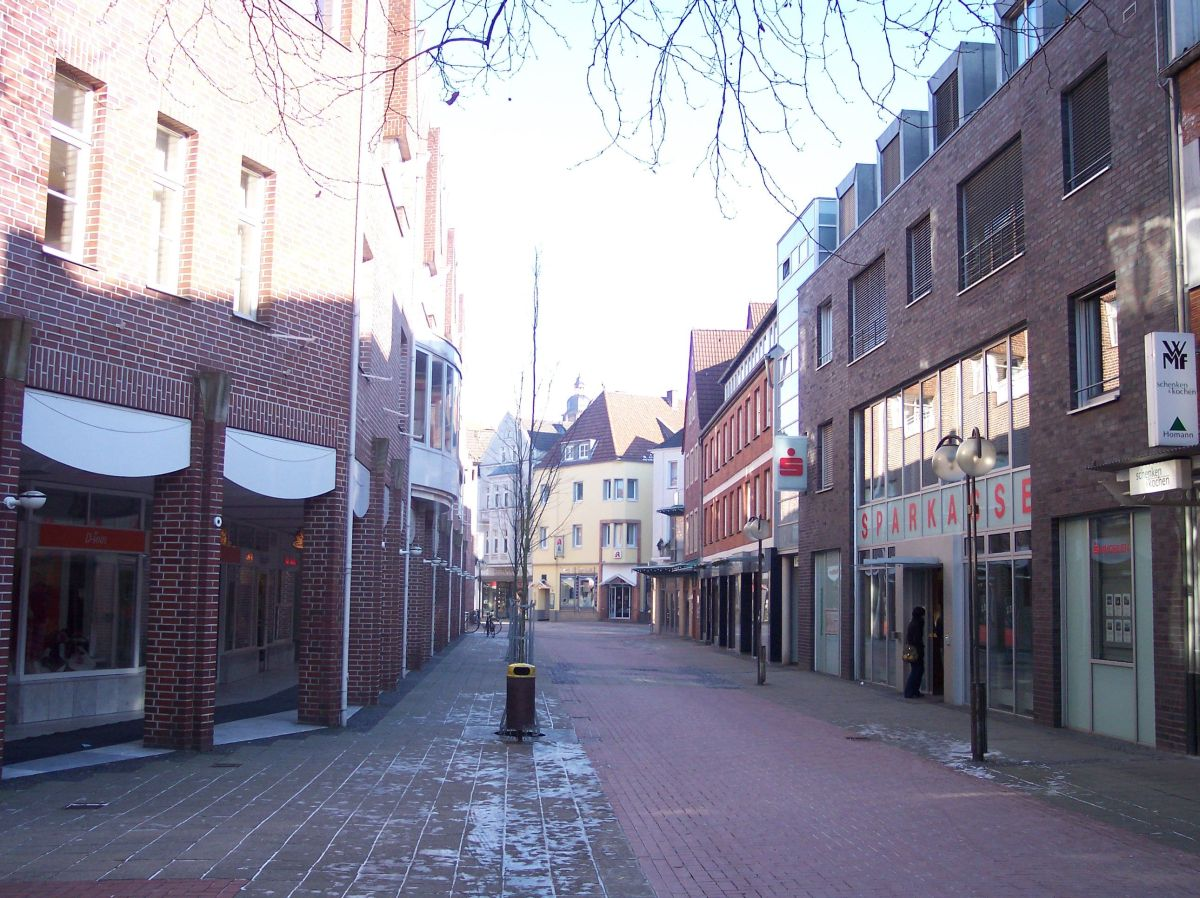

- Coat of arms

- Location of Coesfeld within Coesfeld district
- Interactive map of Coesfeld
- Location within Germany Location within North Rhine-Westphalia
- Coordinates: 51°57′N 7°10′E
- Country: Germany
- State: North Rhine-Westphalia
- Admin. region: Münster
- District: Coesfeld
- Subdivisions: 2

Government
  - Mayor (2020–25): Eliza Diekmann (Ind.)

Area
  - Total: 141.36 km^{2} (54.58 sq mi)
- Elevation: 89 m (292 ft)

Population (2025-12-31)
  - Total: 38,197
  - Density: 270.21/km^{2} (699.84/sq mi)
- Time zone: UTC+01:00 (CET)
  - Summer (DST): UTC+02:00 (CEST)
- Postal codes: 48653
- Dialling codes: 02541
- Vehicle registration: COE
- Website: www.coesfeld.de

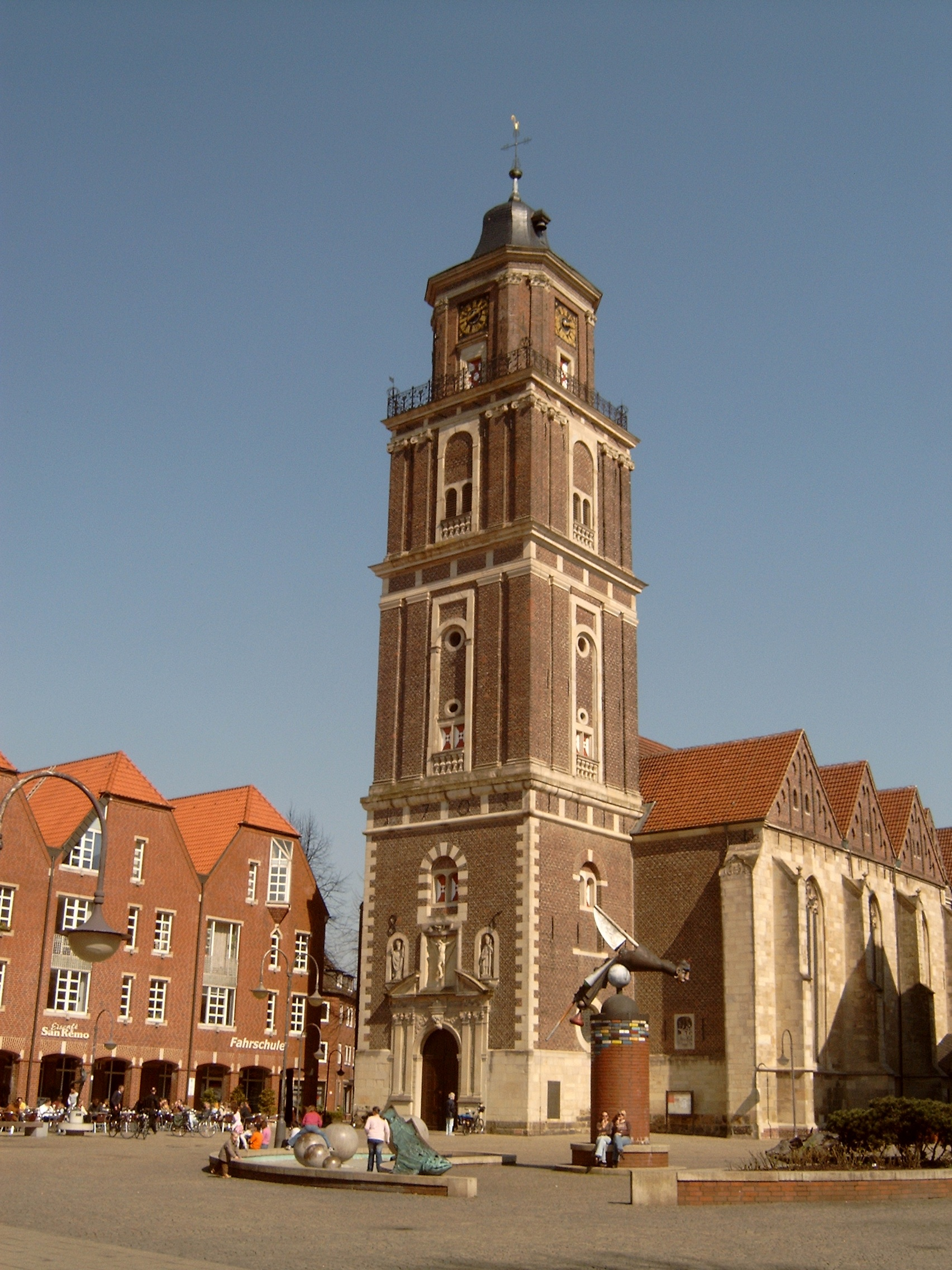
Church of St. Lambert, the destination of the yearly Grand Cross procession, with its 17th-century baroque tower

Coesfeld (German pronunciation: [ˈkoːsfɛlt]; Westphalian: Koosfeld) is the capital of the district of Coesfeld in the German state of North Rhine-Westphalia.

== History ==
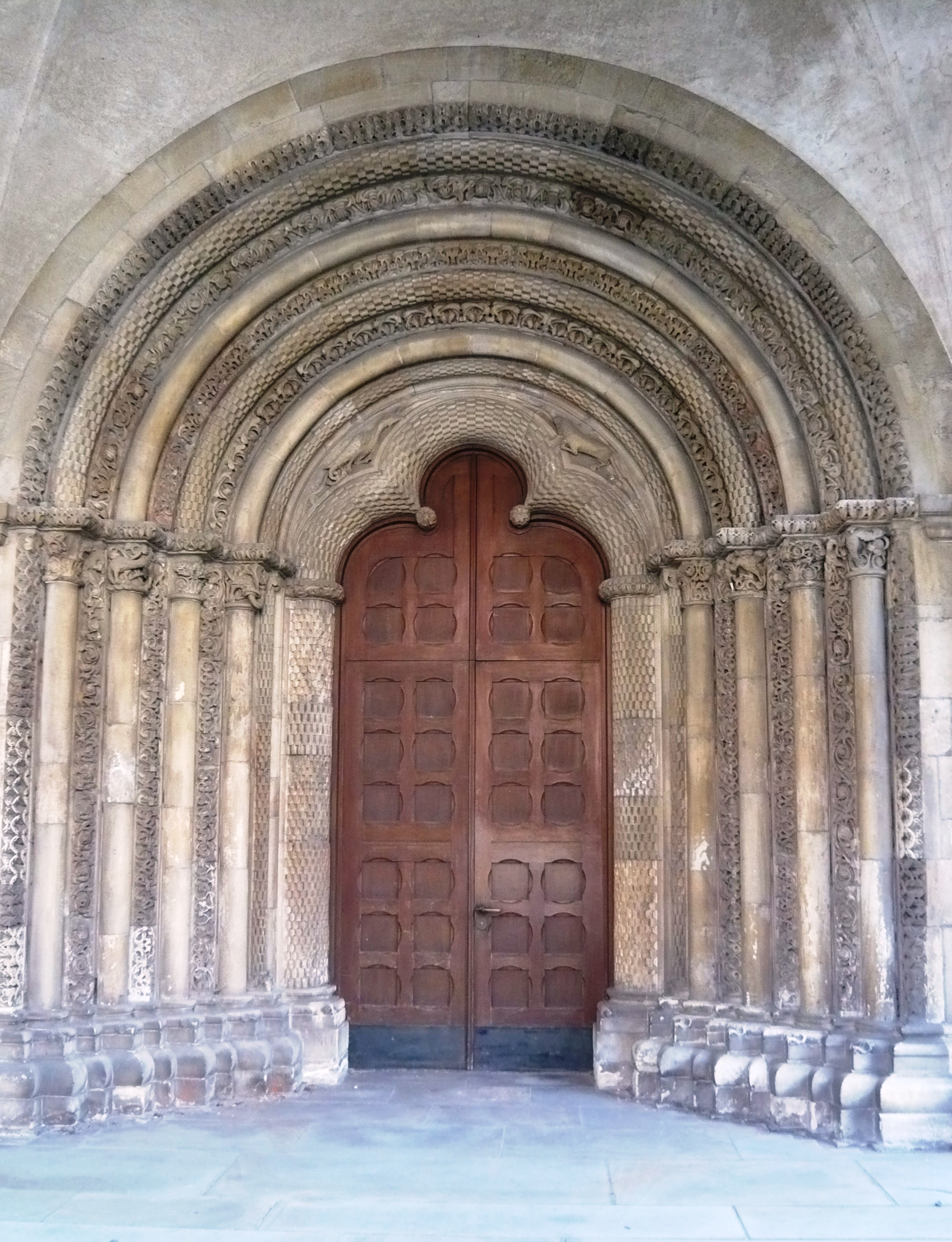
The 12th century St. Jakobikirche was bombed during WWII, but the old doorway survives and a new church was built behind it.

Coesfeld received its city rights in 1197, but was first recorded earlier than that in the biography of St. Ludger, patron and first bishop of the diocese of Munster who was born north of Coesfeld in Billerbeck. The day before he died, Ludger spent the night in Coesfeld and heard mass in the morning in the church he founded. He was on his way from his abbey in Essen to Münster. The road he followed passed Coesfeld and Billerbeck, and after preaching in the St. Lambert's church, 26 March 809, he travelled on to Billerbeck, where he died in the evening.

The Coesfeld St. Jacobikirche dates from the same period as the city charter. For centuries, Coesfeld was an important stopping place for pilgrims traveling one of the more popular Germanic Jakobi routes (Way of St. James) leading from Warendorf over Münster (via Billerbeck) to Coesfeld, and then on via Borken to Wesel on the Rhine.

=== Bernhard von Galen ===
During the Thirty Years' War, troops were stationed in Coesfeld. The Prince-bishop of Münster was often at odds with these troops. Bernhard von Galen managed to drive the foreign troops away and even started to build a palace in Coesfeld, but it was never finished and after he died it was torn down. He became known for his sieges of Dutch cities in his efforts for the Counter-Reformation and started a Way of the Cross procession that still exists up to the present day, with 18 Stations of the Cross. One procession round the historic centre of Coesfeld is still held on Whitmonday but the "Great Procession along the stations of the cross" held for centuries on Whit Tuesday is now held on 9/14 (Exaltation of the Cross) if it is a Sunday otherwise on the Sunday thereafter.

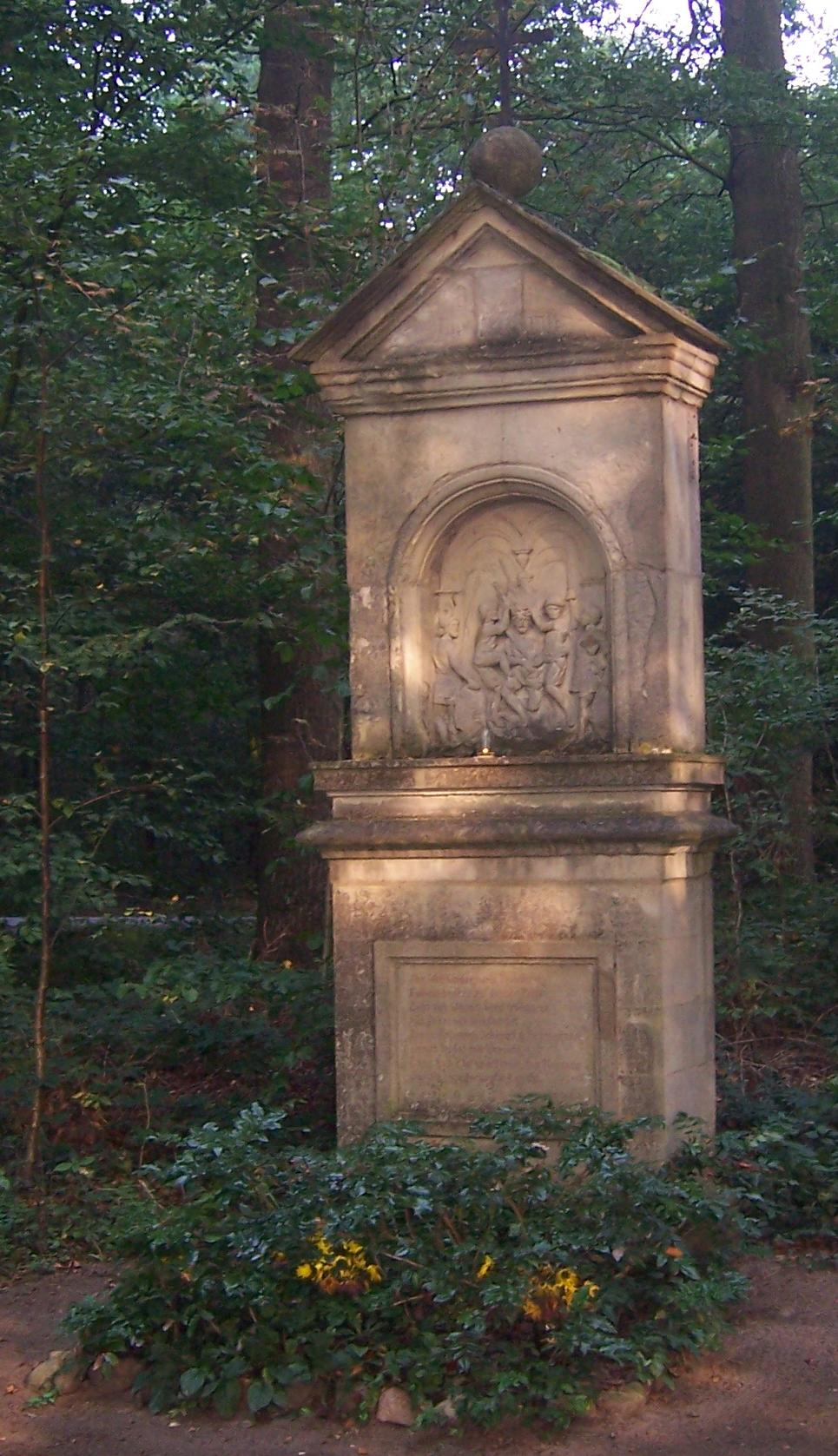
One of the 18 stations of the cross in Coesfeld, erected in Galen's time by his Danish architect Pieter Pictorius

== Geography ==
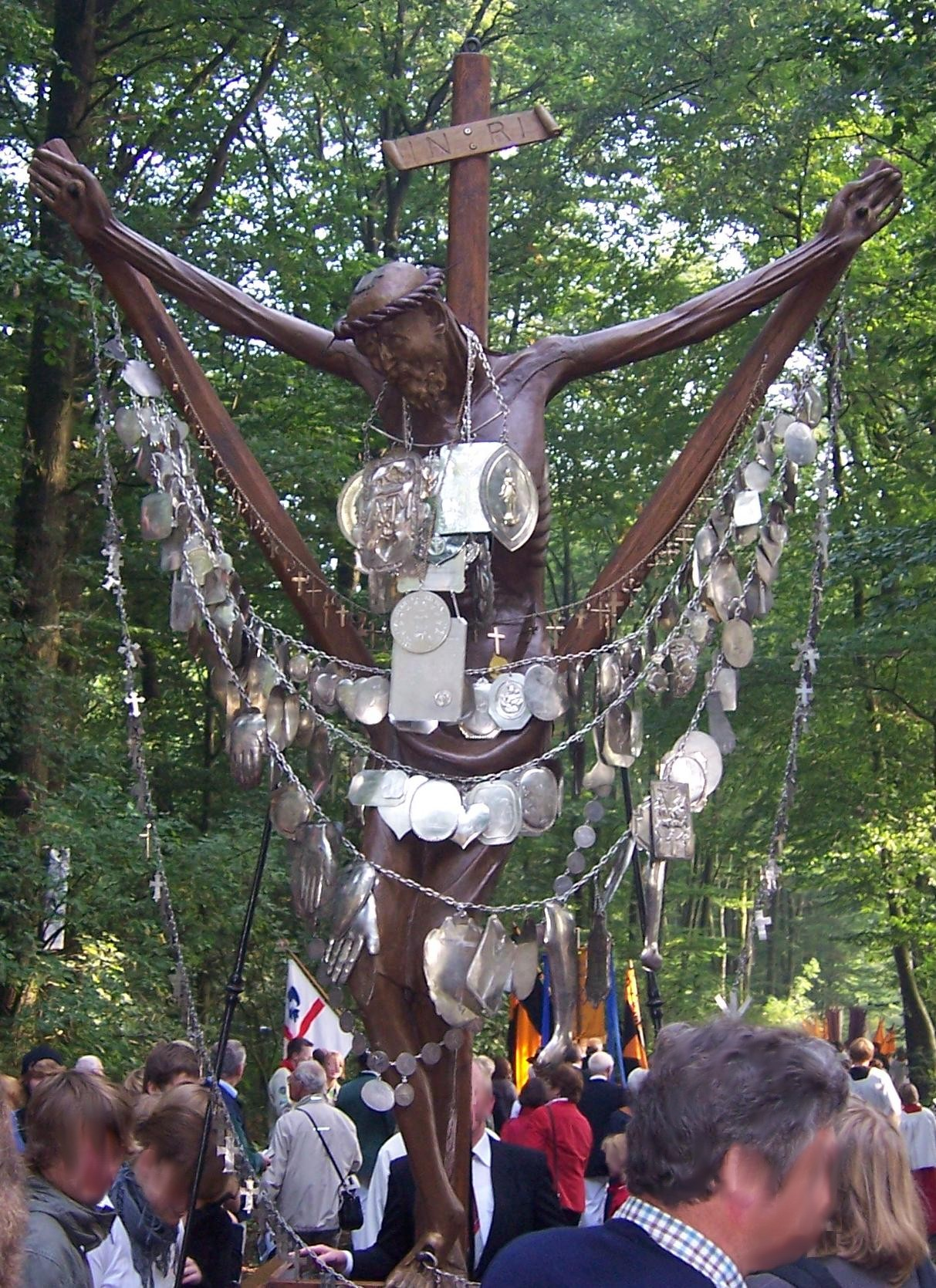
Coesfeld cross hung with silver votive decorations

Coesfeld is situated in the Baumberge in Münsterland.

=== Neighbouring municipalities ===
- Dülmen
- Havixbeck
- Billerbeck
- Nottuln
- Senden

=== Divisions ===
Coesfeld consists of 2 subdivisions:

- Coesfeld
- Lette

== Population ==
Historical population

Year	Pop.	±% p.a.
1965	29,183	—
1970	30,032	+0.58%
1975	30,614	+0.38%
1980	31,062	+0.29%
1985	31,511	+0.29%
1990	32,739	+0.77%
1995	34,747	+1.20%

Year	Pop.	±% p.a.
2000	35,947	+0.68%
2005	36,691	+0.41%
2010	36,345	−0.19%
2015	36,116	−0.13%
2020	36,182	+0.04%
2025	38,197	+1.09%

Source: Landesdatabank Nordrhein-Westfalen

== Education ==
Major secondary schools are:

- the Nepomucenum,
- the Heriburg-Gymnasium
- and the St.-Pius-Gymnasium.

== Twin towns – sister cities ==
Coesfeld is twinned with:

- De Bilt, Netherlands
- Plerguer, France

== Notable people ==
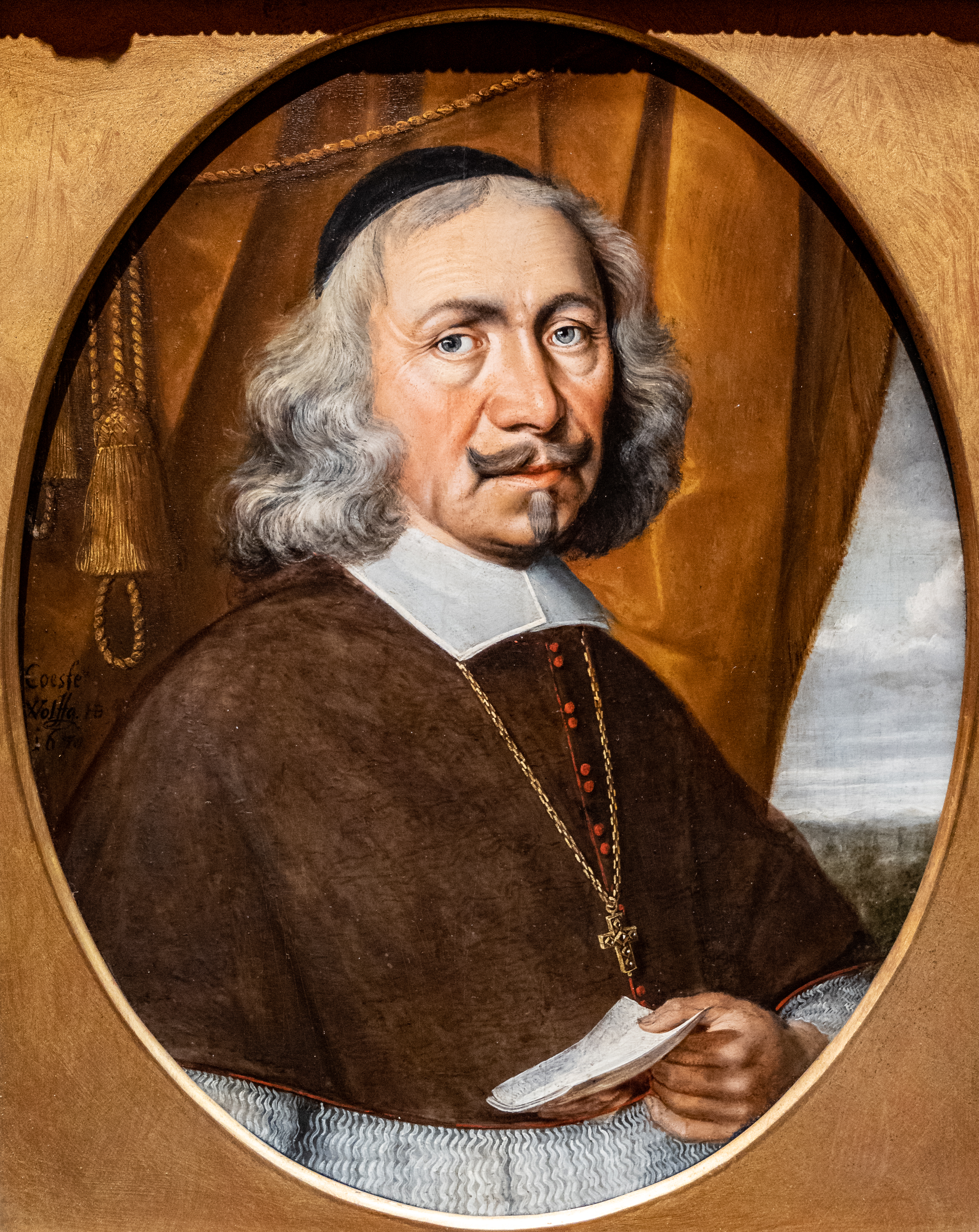
Christoph Bernhard von Galen 1670

- Leunclavius (1541–1594), humanist, legal scholar, Greek scholar and historian
- Christoph Bernhard von Galen (1606–1678), Bishop of Münster, Coesfeld built from a bishopric
- Anne Catherine Emmerich (1774–1824), Roman Catholic nun, visionary and stigmatic
- Claudia Bernadine Elisabeth Hartert (1863–1958), ornithologist
- Otto Bräutigam (1895–1992), lawyer and diplomat, took part in the Holocaust
- Rudolf Wolters (1903–1983), architect and urban planner, close associate of Albert Speer
- Hermann Wedekind (1910–1998), artistic director
- Michael Oenning (born 1965), football player and coach
- Charlotte Quik (born 1972), politician (CDU)
- Henning Höne (born 1987), politician (FDP)
