= Ascheberg =

- Municipality
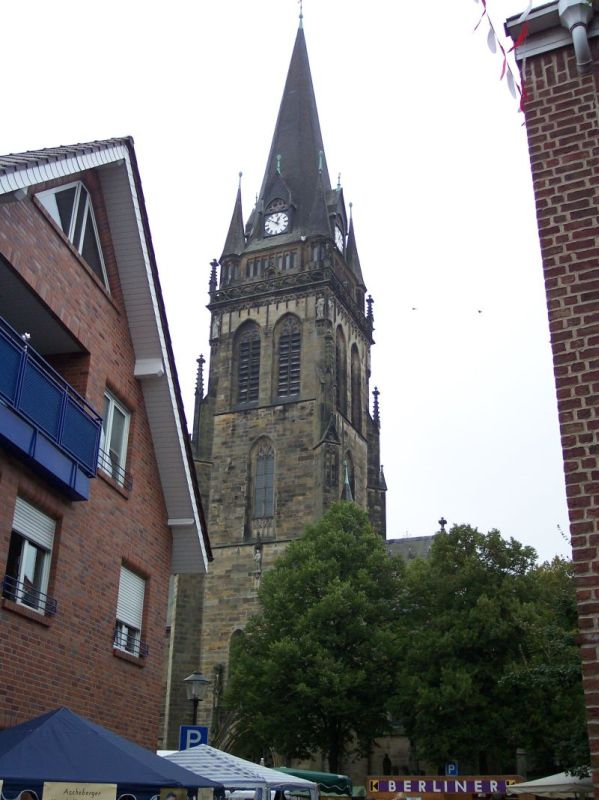
- Saint Lambert Church

- Coat of arms

- Location of Ascheberg within Coesfeld district
- Interactive map of Ascheberg
- Location within Germany Location within North Rhine-Westphalia
- Coordinates: 51°47′20″N 07°37′12″E
- Country: Germany
- State: North Rhine-Westphalia
- Admin. region: Münster
- District: Coesfeld
- Subdivisions: Ascheberg, Davensberg, Herbern

Government
  - Mayor (2025–30): Thomas Stohldreier (CDU)

Area
  - Total: 106.32 km^{2} (41.05 sq mi)
- Elevation: 60–120 m (200–390 ft)

Population (2025-12-31)
  - Total: 15,780
  - Density: 148.4/km^{2} (384.4/sq mi)
- Time zone: UTC+01:00 (CET)
  - Summer (DST): UTC+02:00 (CEST)
- Postal codes: 59387
- Dialling codes: 02593
- Vehicle registration: COE, LH
- Website: www.ascheberg.de

Ascheberg (German pronunciation: [ˈaʃəbɛʁk]) is a municipality in the district of Coesfeld in the state of North Rhine-Westphalia, Germany. The neighbouring cities, towns and municipalities of Ascheberg are (clockwise, starting in the North) the city Münster, the town Drensteinfurt (District Warendorf), the city Hamm, the town Werne (District Unna, the municipalities Nordkirchen and Senden (both District Coesfeld)

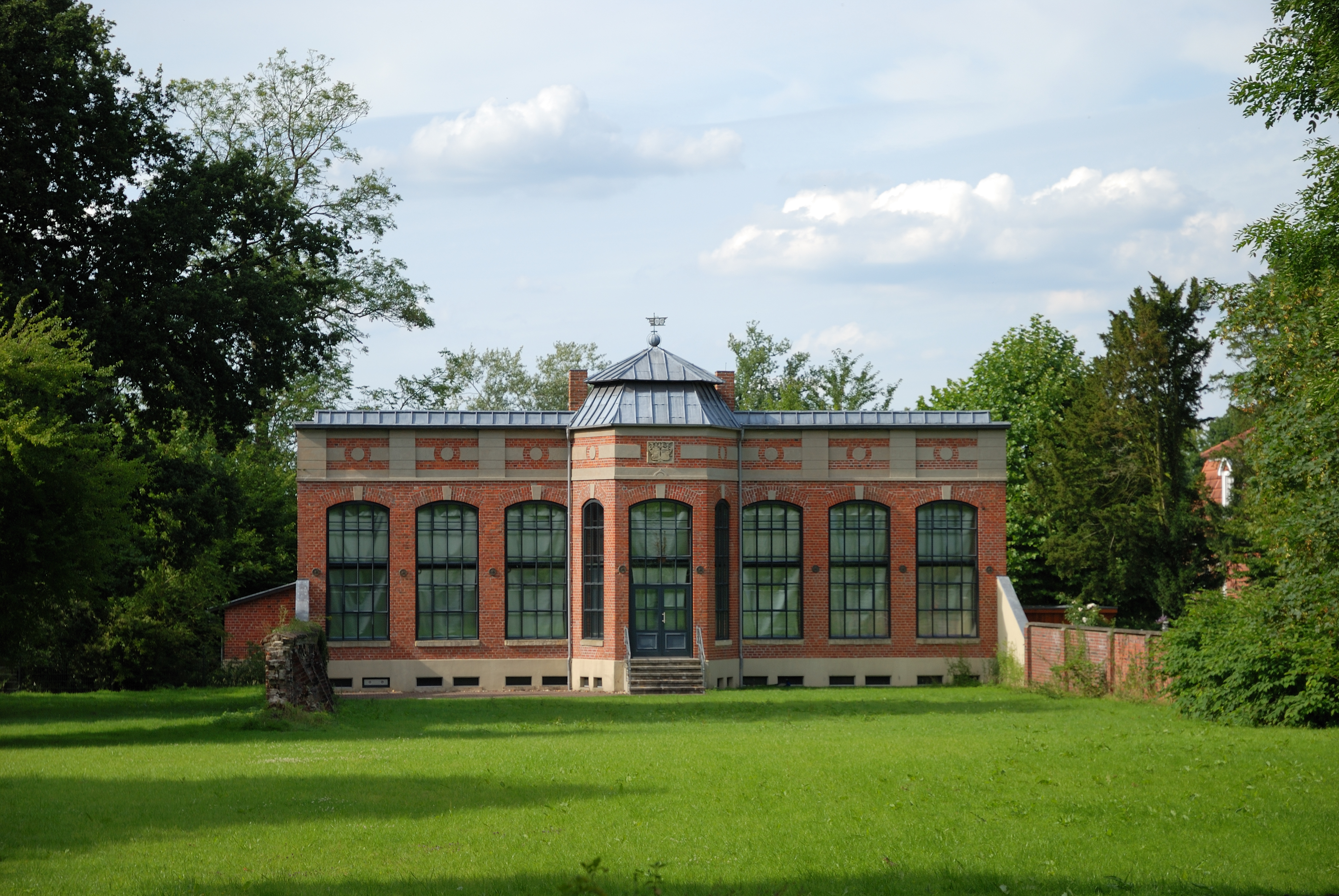
Westerwinkel castle in Herbern district

== Population ==
Historical population

Year	Pop.	±% p.a.
1965	9,934	—
1970	10,428	+0.98%
1975	11,195	+1.43%
1980	11,692	+0.87%
1985	12,310	+1.04%
1990	12,778	+0.75%
1995	13,965	+1.79%

Year	Pop.	±% p.a.
2000	14,893	+1.30%
2005	15,100	+0.28%
2010	14,956	−0.19%
2015	15,253	+0.39%
2020	15,580	+0.43%
2025	15,780	+0.26%

Source: Landesdatabank Nordrhein-Westfalen

== Politics ==
The current mayor is Thomas Stohldreier of the CDU who has been serving as mayor since 2020. In the 2025 local elections he was reelected with 92% of votes, being the only candidate.

=== City council ===
After the 2025 elections, the Ascheberg city council is composed as follows:

Party	Votes	%	+/-	Seats	+/-
Christian Democratic Union (CDU)	4,278	53.3	▲4.3	15	±0
Social Democratic Party (SPD)	1,332	16.6	▼0.1	5	±0
Alliance 90/The Greens (Grüne)	982	12.2	▼1.5	3	▼1
Independent Voters' Association (UWG)	949	11.8	▲4.8	3	▼1
Free Democratic Party (FDP)	463	5.8	▼0.4	2	±0
Independent	27	0.3	New	0	New
Valid votes	8,031	97.9			
Invalid votes	170	2.1			
Total	8,201	100.0		30	▼2
Electorate/voter turnout	12,623	65.0			
Source: City of Ascheberg

== Born in Ascheberg ==
- Franz Falke (1909-1994), politician
- Wolfgang Sandhowe (born 1953 in Ascheberg), soccer player, today football coach
- Orhan Dönmez (born 1972)

== Twin cities ==
- (Italy) Buggiano
