= Coesfeld (district) =

Coordinates: 51°52′N 7°23′E

- District
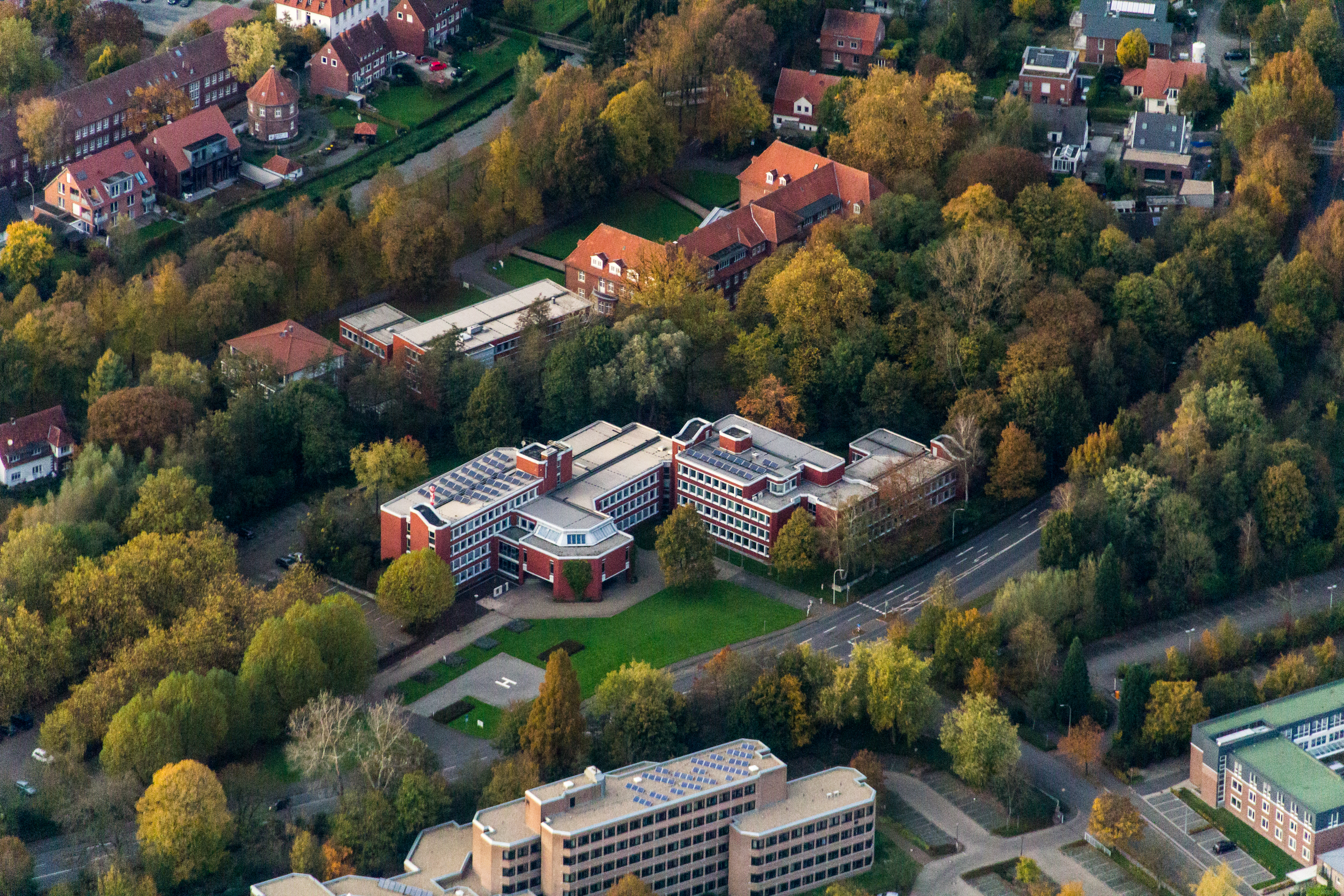

- Flag Coat of arms
- Country: Germany
- State: North Rhine-Westphalia
- Adm. region: Münster
- Capital: Coesfeld

Government
  - District admin.: Christian Schulze Pellengahr (CDU)

Area
  - Total: 1,109.79 km^{2} (428.49 sq mi)

Population (31 December 2025)
  - Total: 227,168
  - Density: 204.695/km^{2} (530.157/sq mi)
- Time zone: UTC+01:00 (CET)
  - Summer (DST): UTC+02:00 (CEST)
- Vehicle registration: COE, LH
- Website: www.kreis-coesfeld.de

Coesfeld (German pronunciation: [ˈkoːsfɛlt]) is a Kreis (district) in the northwestern part of North Rhine-Westphalia, Germany, west of the city of Münster. Neighboring districts are Steinfurt, district-free Münster, Warendorf, district-free Hamm, Unna, Recklinghausen, and Borken.

== History ==
In medieval times the region was subordinate to the bishopric of Münster. When the area became part of the Prussian province Westphalia in 1816 the new administration created two districts, Coesfeld and Lüdinghausen. Except minor changes they stayed until the major reorganization in 1975 when both were merged to form the current district. A few municipalities from the district Münster were also added, while others formerly belonging to the district were moved to neighboring districts.

== Geography ==
The district is located in the Münsterland, a mostly rural area. The Lippe River forms part of the border of the district in the south.

== Coat of arms ==
The coat of arms depicts a bishop, a goose and a bell. The bishop is Saint Liudger, the first bishop of Münster. The goose was according to a popular legend thrown into a dry well by Liudger, in order to find water during a drought. The bells of Lüdinghausen allegedly chimed by themselves, whenever Liudger entered the town. The left side derives from the former coat of arms of the district Lüdinghausen, while the right side comes from the old district Coesfeld. The coat of arms were granted in 1979.

== Towns and municipalities ==
Clickable map of municipalities in the district

Towns
1. Billerbeck
2. Coesfeld
3. Dülmen
4. Lüdinghausen
5. Olfen
1. Ascheberg
2. Havixbeck
3. Nordkirchen
4. Nottuln
5. Rosendahl
6. Senden
