= Nordkirchen =

- Municipality
- Flag Coat of arms

- Location of Nordkirchen within Coesfeld district
- Interactive map of Nordkirchen
- Location within Germany Location within North Rhine-Westphalia
- Coordinates: 51°44′17″N 7°31′32″E
- Country: Germany
- State: North Rhine-Westphalia
- Admin. region: Münster
- District: Coesfeld
- Subdivisions: 3

Government
  - Mayor (2020–25): Dietmar Bergmann

Area
  - Total: 52.41 km^{2} (20.24 sq mi)
- Elevation: 65 m (213 ft)

Population (2025-12-31)
  - Total: 10,844
  - Density: 206.9/km^{2} (535.9/sq mi)
- Time zone: UTC+01:00 (CET)
  - Summer (DST): UTC+02:00 (CEST)
- Postal codes: 59394
- Dialling codes: 0 25 96
- Vehicle registration: COE, LH
- Website: www.nordkirchen.de

Nordkirchen (German pronunciation: [nɔʁtˈkɪʁçn̩]) is a municipality in the district of Coesfeld, in North Rhine-Westphalia, Germany. Nordkirchen's most famous site is Schloss Nordkirchen, built in the 18th century for a local bishop and known as the Versailles of Westphalia, as it is the largest residence in that part of Germany. Nordkirchen is known as location of a transmission site for medium wave for transmitting the program of Deutschlandfunk, the Nordkirchen transmitter.

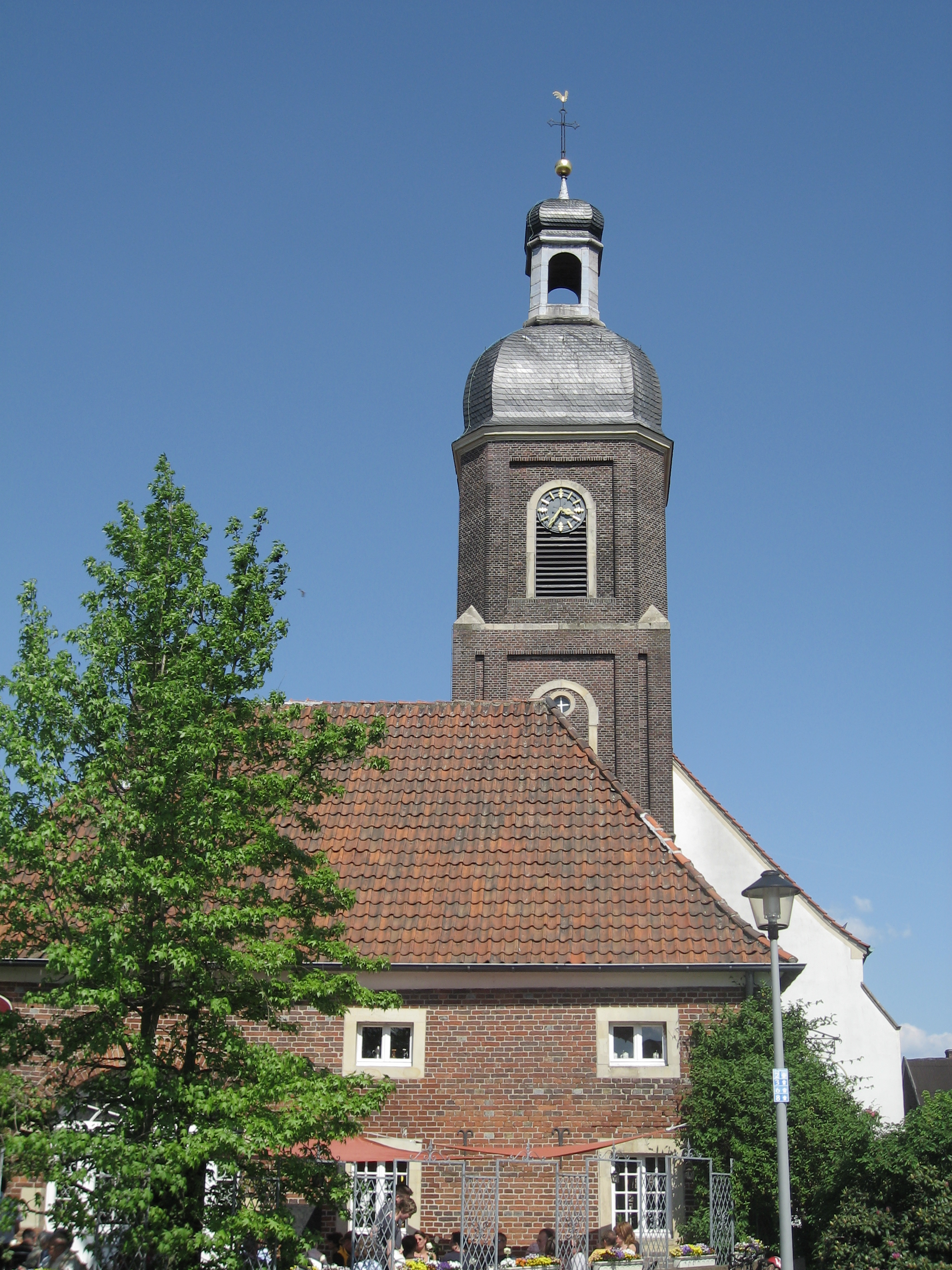
Nordkirchen Church St. Mauritius

== Population ==
Historical population

Year	Pop.	±% p.a.
1965	5,164	—
1970	7,125	+6.65%
1975	7,975	+2.28%
1980	8,534	+1.36%
1985	8,586	+0.12%
1990	8,359	−0.53%
1995	9,283	+2.12%

Year	Pop.	±% p.a.
2000	9,956	+1.41%
2005	10,201	+0.49%
2010	10,434	+0.45%
2015	9,781	−1.28%
2020	10,117	+0.68%
2025	10,844	+1.40%

Source: Landesdatabank Nordrhein-Westfalen

== Mayor ==
The mayor is Dietmar Bergmann. He was elected in 2009 and reelected in 2014 and 2020.

== See also ==
- Arenberg-Nordkirchen
- Nordkirchen Castle
