= Münster (region) =

Coordinates: 52°00′N 7°30′E

Münster Regierungsbezirk Münster
- Regierungsbezirk
- Seal

- Map of North Rhine-Westphalia highlighting Münster
- Country: Germany
- State: North Rhine-Westphalia
- Region seat: Münster

Government
  - District President: Andreas Bothe (FDP)

Area
  - Total: 6,904.93 km^{2} (2,666.01 sq mi)

Population (31 December 2025)
  - Total: 2,649,519
  - Density: 383.714/km^{2} (993.815/sq mi)

GDP
  - Total: €112.830 billion (2024)
  - Per capita: €42,433 (2024)
- Website: bezreg-muenster.nrw.de

Münster (German pronunciation: [ˈmʏnstɐ]) is one of the five Regierungsbezirke of North Rhine-Westphalia, Germany, located in the north of the state, and named after the capital city of Münster. It includes the area which in medieval times was known as the Dreingau.

Regierungsbezirk Münster mostly covers rural areas of Münsterland famous for their castles, e.g. Castle Nordkirchen and Castle Ahaus. The region offers more than a hundred castles, all linked up by the cycle path 100 Schlösser Route.

The three southern municipalities are part of the Ruhrgebiet, a densely populated region with much industry. Besides this the area is mostly as green as the rest of Münsterland and historically a part of the landscape.

The history of the Regierungsbezirk dates back to 1815, when it was one of the original 25 Regierungsbezirke created as a subdivision of the provinces of Prussia. The last reorganization of the districts was made in 1975, when the number of districts was reduced from ten to five, and the number of district-free cities from six to three.

Kreise
(districts)
1. Borken
2. Coesfeld
3. Recklinghausen
4. Steinfurt
5. Warendorf
Kreisfreie Städte
(district-free towns)
1. Bottrop
2. Gelsenkirchen
3. Münster

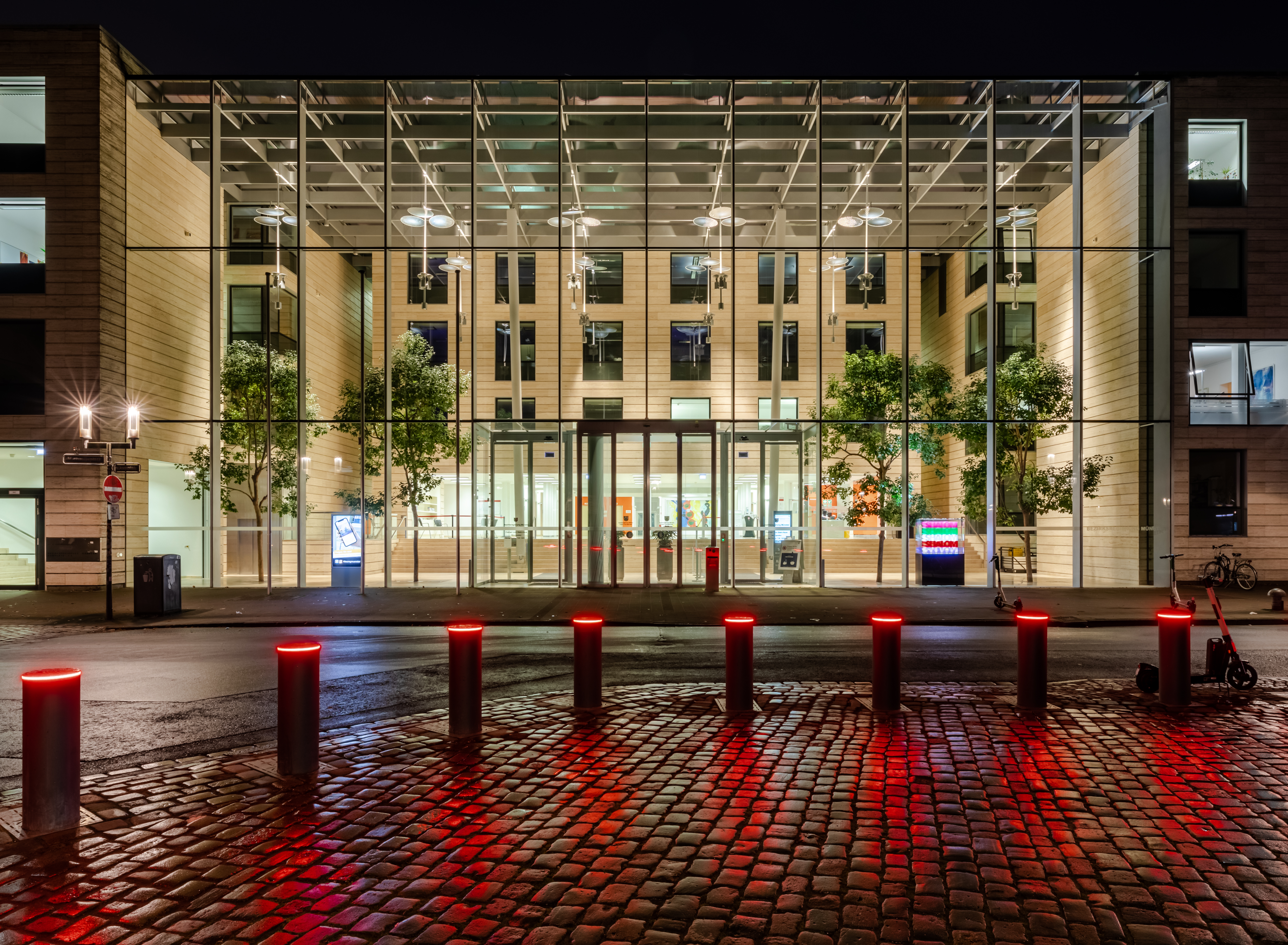
Freiherr-vom-Stein-Haus - Seat of the district government at the Cathedral Square in Münster

== Climate ==
The climate is mainly maritime. Temperatures above 30 °C during the summer were rare until the 1980s. Recently some summer months got more hot and dry or cool and wet with an increased abundance of extreme weather.

In winter time temperatures deep frost below -10 °C occurs especially in times of Berlin Phenomenon and is rare in years without. Long-time average temperatures of about 1 °C in January and February mean that frost is quite common.

== Economy ==
The Gross domestic product (GDP) of the region was 88.1 billion € in 2018, accounting for 2.6% of German economic output. GDP per capita adjusted for purchasing power was 30,900 € or 102% of the EU27 average in the same year. The GDP per employee was 94% of the EU average.

== Traffic ==
A common way to traverse the Münsterland is by bicycle. The mostly flat landscape invites cycling, both on-road riding (e.g. the Münsterland Giro race) and relaxed tours on small rural roads and Pättkes (minor paths, some even unpaved). Embedded in a 4,500-kilometre-long (2,800 mi) network of cycle paths are not only the most utilised themed routes, but also many small and large tours and round courses through the region. Some infrastructure for cyclists including bed & bike farms, navigation systems, and service-stations make Münsterland a popular cycling area.

The road system is well-maintained and several highways offer fast access to nearly all areas.

In those areas where railroads haven't been closed down by the 1980s, frequent and fast service is offered. One streetcar system has survived in the city of Gelsenkirchen and many other towns and cities offer a bus network. Rural areas are connected by bus as well.

The Münsterland can be explored by boat on some canals, including the Dortmund–Ems Canal and Wesel–Datteln Canal. They connect the area to the harbours in Duisburg and Münster, the German coast and the rest of the German waterway system.

== Landmarks ==
- Ahaus Castle
- Gerleve Abbey
- Herten Castle
- Horst Castle
- Hülshoff Castle - birthplace of Annette von Droste-Hülshoff
- Lembeck Castle
- Münster Cathedral
- Nordkirchen Castle - the most important castle, also called "Westphalian Versailles"
- House of Rüschhaus
- St. Lambertus Cathedral
- Steinfurt Castle
- Westerwinkel Castle
- The Industrial Heritage Trail - big part of this collection of monuments originated by the Industrial Revolution is sited in the southern half of this area
