= Duchy of Westphalia =

State of the Holy Roman Empire (1102–1803)

Duchy of Westphalia Herzogtum Westfalen (German)
- 1102–1803
- Coat of arms

- The Duchy of Westphalia and other western German states c. 1645
- Status: Subordinate to Electorate of Cologne; State of the Holy Roman Empire
- Capital: Arnsberg; 50°54′56″N 8°06′56″E
- Government: Feudal monarchy
- Historical era: Middle Ages
  - Established: 1102
  - Annexed by Hesse-Darmstadt: 1803
Preceded by	Succeeded by
Duchy of Saxony	County of Lippe; Landgraviate of Hesse-Darmstadt

The Duchy of Westphalia (German: Herzogtum Westfalen) was a historic territory in the Holy Roman Empire, which existed from 1102 to 1803. It was located in the greater region of Westphalia, originally one of the three main regions in the German stem duchy of Saxony and today part of the state of North Rhine-Westphalia. The duchy was held by the archbishop-electors of Cologne until its secularization in 1803.

== Geography ==
The duchy roughly comprised the territory of the present-day districts of Olpe and Hochsauerland, as well as the adjacent areas of the Soest district and Märkischer Kreis (Menden and Balve), from 1507 also the exclave of Volkmarsen (a former property of the Imperial Abbey of Corvey). The town of Soest was lost to the Duchy of Cleves-Mark after the Soest Feud in 1449.

The duchy bordered on the territory of the prince-bishops of Münster beyond the Lippe river in the north and on the Prince-Bishopric of Paderborn in the northeast; both ecclesiastical principalities also had emerged from the former Duchy of Saxony, while the Landgraviate of Hesse, the counties of Nassau and Waldeck in the southeast were part of the former stem duchy of Franconia. The Rhenish Duchy of Berg and the Westphalian County of Mark in the west remained an obstacle to a land connection with the Cologne territory on the Lower Rhine river.

The Westphalian duchy formed the largest part of the Cologne electorate. Apart from the fertile Hellweg Börde north of the Haar hill range, part of the Westphalian Lowland, the ducal lands primarily comprised mountainous and densely forested areas, with some significant metal deposits and brine springs. The Hellweg section connecting the towns of Werl, Erwitte and Geseke was part of an important trade route from Aachen to Goslar.

== History ==
Formerly part of the Saxon stem duchy along with Angria and Eastphalia, the Westphalian lands were Christianized by the Cologne archbishops at the behest of the Frankish ruler Charlemagne upon his conquests in the Saxon Wars. First parishes were established east of the Rhenish estates around Soest, where the archbishops extended their episcopal territory. Numerous monastery foundations, like Grafschaft Abbey in 1072 by Anno II of Cologne, stabilized the ecclesiastical rule.

=== Creation of the duchy (1102–1180) ===
In the fierce Investiture Controversy, Archbishop Frederick I of Cologne in 1102 had occupied and seized half of the territory held by the Westphalian counts of Arnsberg, supporters of Emperor Henry IV. The other counties of the region could not resist the encroachment of the mighty Archbishopric, and soon after the counties of Werl, Rüthen and Volmarstein (near Wetter) followed. The former counts of Werl created a new county known as Werl-Arnsberg, and managed to keep their smaller and smaller territory independent of the Archbishops until they finally sold in 1368. After the rebellious Saxon duke Henry the Lion was defeated in 1180, Emperor Frederick Barbarossa presented the Archbishop of Cologne, Philip of Heinsberg with these territories and the southwest of the former Duchy of Saxony as the 'Duchy of Westphalia'.

=== Expansion (1180–1445) ===
Engelbert of Berg, archbishop of Cologne from 1220, began a campaign to force the nobility in Westphalia into submission and to extract from them the stewardship of the various scattered church lands. Engelbert managed to connect the lands of the duchy by annexing the territory from Hellweg to Diemel, and secured the south of the Sauerland at Attendorn in 1222. Further controversy of its expansion eventually leads to Engelbert's death at the hands of Frederick I of Isenberg in 1225. In 1260 by an agreement with the Dukes of Brunswick the Weser River became the official border of their spheres of influence. In 1277 the archbishops managed to defeat a large confederation of Westphalian and Lower Rhenish opponents, but further action in 1288 forced the archbishops to abandon intentions on much of the greater territory of Westphalia. The purchase and annexation of Werl-Arnsberg in 1368 united the territories of the north and south of the Sauerland.

Archbishop Frederick von Saarwerden began a hopeless campaign to maintain Colognian rights in Marck, and in 1392 was forced to abandon them. His successor, Dietrich II of Moers witnessed the last attempts by Cologne to gain rulership in Westphalia by attempting to break the powerful positions of Cleves and Marck. The financial burden placed upon the knights and cities of the Duchy of Westphalia led them into union in 1437. Cologne made peace with Cleves in 1441: this led Soest, the richest town of Westphalia, to refuse recognising Colognian supremacy in 1444 in the Soest Feud, that lasted until 1449. Soest had become a part of the Duchy of Cleves. Thereafter the town of Arnsberg became the administrative capital of Westphalia. Economically the loss of Soest had weakened the duchy. Especially as the surroundings of the town were very fertile and the grain was needed for the mountainous regions in the South. Peace with Marck was made in 1445 which witnessed territorial concessions from both sides.

=== Westphalia until the end of the Empire (1445–1806) ===
Arms of Westphalia (adopted in 1532)

After the Soest Feud, the city of Soest remained part of the Duchy of Cleves. Starting from 1463, the league of knights and cities in Westphalia began a long and bitter struggle against the archbishops. During the reign of Archbishop Herman V of Wied (1515–1546), the Reformation arrived in Westphalia. Eventually the Reformation was suppressed, but during the reign of Archbishop Gebhard Truchsess von Waldburg (1577–1583) the Reformation returned and he was forced to attend to Westphalia in 1582 where several knights and cities had adopted the new doctrine. The newly elected Archbishop Ernest of Bavaria (1583–1612) and his brother Ferdinand of Bavaria managed to regain the duchy for the archbishopric at the beginning of the Cologne War in 1583, and Protestantism survived only on the border region of Waldeck and Hesse. The Duchy of Westphalia was again confirmed as integral territory of the archbishopric in 1590.

Like most other territories of Germany, Westphalia suffered during the Thirty Years' War. In 1794 the archbishops relocated to Westphalia after the French had annexed the territories west of the Rhine River. In the secularisation of 1803 the Duchy of Westphalia became part of Hesse-Darmstadt.

=== After the Empire (1806–1815) ===
In 1807 the Kingdom of Westphalia was created although it did not include the Duchy and had its capital in Hesse at Kassel. In 1815 the Congress of Vienna awarded the Duchy of Westphalia to Prussia in exchange for important lands west of the Rhine, and the Duchy was incorporated into the Province of Westphalia the same year.
