= Paderborn Plateau =

The Paderborn Plateau (German: Paderborner Hochfläche) in central Germany is, geologically speaking, the southeastern element of the Westphalian Bight and, at the same time, the largest limestone and karst landscape in Westphalia.

In the west the Alme valley forms the boundary with the Hellweg region including the Haarstrang and Hellweg Börde; to the north the plateau is bordered by the Lippe depression, the Senne and the Teutoburg Forest. Its eastern limit is the Eggegebirge. To the south are the Sauerland and the Waldeck Upland.

The Paderborn Plateau is divided into four landscape regions: The Sintfeld in the south, the Brenken Plateau in the west, the Bockfeld in the north and the Lichtenau Plateau (Soratfeld) in the east.

== See also ==
- Natural regions of Germany
