= Coat of arms of North Rhine-Westphalia =

Coat of arms of the German state of North Rhine-Westphalia

Versions
- North Rhine-Westphalia (dark green) within Germany
- Armiger: North Rhine-Westphalia
- Adopted: 1948
- Shield: per pale: 1 the former Rhine Province, 2 the former Province of Westphalia, and enté en point embowed: the former Free State of Lippe
- Predecessor(s): Rhine Province, Province of Westphalia, Free State of Lippe
- Use: within the German state of North Rhine-Westphalia

The coat of arms of North Rhine-Westphalia is the official coat of arms of the German state of North Rhine-Westphalia.

== Overview ==
The divisions of NRW, with Lippe, part of Westphalia, shown in pink

After World War II on August 23, 1946 the British military administration in Germany established the new state of North Rhine-Westphalia with the merger of the provinces of Westphalia and North Rhine, the northern part of the Prussian Rhine Province, to which in January 1947 the Free State of Lippe was added. That same year Wolfgang Pagenstecher, a famous German heraldist living in Düsseldorf, made the original blazon for the newly created state, which adopted it on 5 February 1948. On 10 March 1953 this has been confirmed by the Law about the state's colours, the state's coat of arms and the state' s flag.

The named law starts as follows:

§ 1 The state's colors are green-white-red.
§ 2 The state's coat of arms is party per pale Vert a bend sinister wavy Argent and Gules a horse rampant Argent, enté en point embowed Argent a rose Gules seeded and leaved Or.

...

— State Government of North Rhine Westphalia, Law about the state's colours, the state's coat of arms and the state' s flag of March 10, 1953

So the constituent three parts of this coat of arms are:

- dexter: Vert a bend sinister wavy Argent, which is a reflection of the former coat of arms of Rhine Province. This until then showed a bend wavy, representing the river Rhine flowing through the Rhineland, today's southwestern part of the state. The change from bend to bend sinister has only been done because of aesthetic reasons.
- sinister: Gules a horse rampant Argent, as opposed to the jumping horse in the arms of Lower Saxony, representing Westphalia, the northeastern part of the state. Originally it was the Saxon steed, the emblem of the Saxon stern duchy. It is identical to the preceding coat of arms of the Province of Westphalia.
- enté en point embowed: Argent a rose Gules seeded and leaved Or, showing the rose of Lippe. This was the coat of arms of the Principality of Lippe, now the district of Lippe in the east of the state.

The coat of arms appears as a charge on the state flag of North Rhine-Westphalia.

== History ==
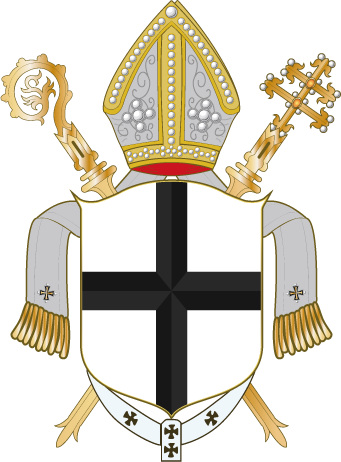
Electorate of Cologne 953–1803

Duchy of Cleves 1092–1795

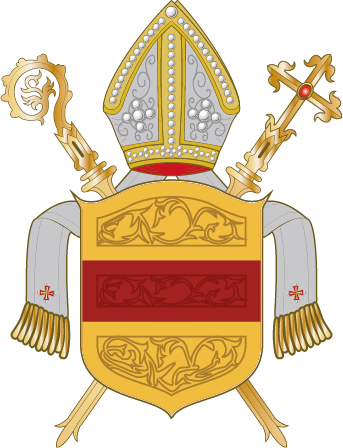
Prince-Bishopric of Münster 1180–1802

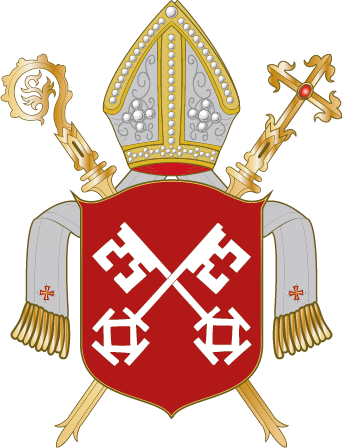
Prince-Bishopric of Minden 1180–1648

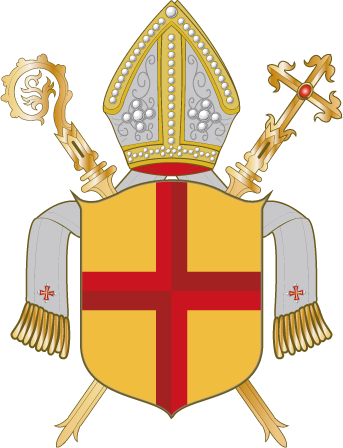
Prince-Bishopric of Paderborn (1281–1802)

Duchy of Jülich

County of Ravensberg 1140s – 1807

Duchy of Berg 1101–1815

County of Mark c. 1198–1807

Duchy of Westphalia (1102–1803)

Principality of Lippe 1123–1918

County of Arenberg 1549–1810

County of Sayn-Wittgenstein-Berleburg (1607–1806)

Grand Duchy of Berg 1806–1808

Grand Duchy of Berg 1809–1813

Free State of Lippe 1918–1947

Rhine Province 1822–1946

Province of Westphalia (1815–1946)

== See also ==
- List of coats of arms of the districts in North Rhine-Westphalia
- Coat of arms of Prussia
- Coat of arms of Germany
- Origin of the coats of arms of German federal states.
