= Westphalian Lowland =

Lowland primarily in Westphalia, Germany

Coordinates: 51.9629°N 7.6287°E

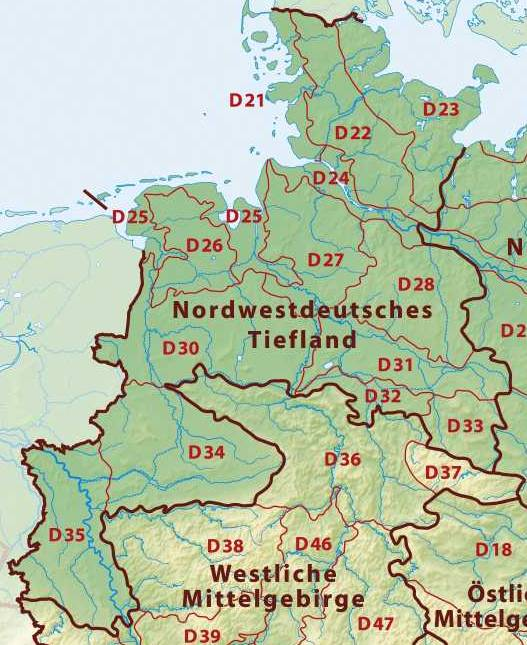
The Westphalian Basin (D34) within the North(west) German Plain

The Westphalian Lowland, also known as the Westphalian Basin is a flat landscape that mainly lies within the German region of Westphalia, although small areas also fall within North Rhine (in the extreme southwest) and in Lower Saxony (on the northern periphery). Together with the neighbouring Lower Rhine Plain to the west, it represents the second most southerly region of the North German Plain, after the Cologne Bight. It is variously known in German as the Westfälische Bucht (Westphalian Bay), the Münsterländer or Westfälische Tieflands- or Flachlandsbucht (Münsterland or Westphalian Lowland or Plain).

The Westphalian Lowland consists of the individual regions of Münsterland, the Emscherland in the (western) south, and regions even further south that flank the Sauerland around the Hellweg.

The Westphalian Lowland is classified as a major unit group within the natural regions of Germany and is number 54 in the Handbook of the Natural Regional Divisions of Germany (Handbuch der naturräumlichen Gliederung Deutschlands) and region D34 in the BfN system; both using the same boundaries.

== Natural region divisions ==
From a natural region perspective the Westphalian Lowland major unit group is sub-divided into the following three-figure major units:

- (to North German Plain) (Norddeutsches Tiefland)
  - 54 (=D34) Westphalian Basin (Westfälische Bucht)
    - 540 East Münsterland (Ostmünsterland)
    - 541 Kernmünsterland
    - 542 Hellweg Börde (Hellwegbörden)
    - 543 Emscherland
    - 544 West Münsterland (Westmünsterland)
    - 545 West Hellweg (Westenhellweg)

== Location ==
The Westphalian Lowland has the character of a basin because it is bounded by ridges of the Lower Saxon Hills from the northeast to east and by the northern part of the Süder Uplands to the south. These hills rise to heights of several hundred metres above the basin floor.

The boundary of this natural region runs, clockwise from the north, as follows: From Rheine southeastwards along the southern edge of the Teutoburg Forest, from southwest of Osnabrück heading southwest of Bielefeld to the point where the Teutoburg Forest meets the Eggegebirge. From here the boundary runs to the Paderborn Plateau in front of the Egge heading south-southwest via Paderborn and Büren.

From east of Rüthen its boundary with the North Sauerland Oberland (including the Arnsberg Forest Nature Park) runs in a westerly direction, passing the Möhnesee immediately south of the Haarstrang and then runs south of the Hellweg to the edge of the Lower Sauerland to south of Dortmund, from where its course takes it further west, north of the Ardey Hills and the adjoining parts of the Lower Berg-Mark Hills (Niederbergisch-Märkisches Hügelland) heading south of Bochum and Essen to the vicinity of Mülheim.

From east of Mülheim its unremarkable boundary with the Lower Rhine Plain runs northwards via Bottrop, Dorsten, Borken and finally along the state border with the Netherlands, to Gronau.

=== Towns and cities ===
The largest centres of population in the Westphalian Lowland are the cities of the central and eastern Ruhrgebiet north of the River Ruhr in the southwest of the region and the cities of Münster in the centre, Gütersloh in the north and Paderborn on the eastern periphery. The city centre of Bielefeld lies outside the region on the other side of the Teutoburg Forest; however some neighbourhoods of the city (Brackwede, Quelle, Senne, Sennestadt) lie within the northern part of the basin.

The most populous cities in the Westphalian Lowland are (in brackets their population in thousands):

- Dortmund (less the south - 581)
- Essen (less the south - 576)
- Bochum (less the south - 376)
- Bielefeld (only Sennestadt - i.e. only 21 of 323)
- Münster (276)
- Gelsenkirchen (260)
- Oberhausen (only minimal parts in the east - small elements of 214)
- Hamm (182)
- Herne (166)
- Mülheim (only the northwest - small elements of 167)
- Paderborn (only northeastern part - parts of 145)
- Recklinghausen (119)
- Bottrop (apart from the extreme west - 117)
- Witten (only the northern half - part of 99)
- Gütersloh (102)

=== Rivers ===
The most important river systems are:

- Münsterland: the (upper) Ems and Lippe
- Emscherland: the almost entirely underground or canalised Emscher that gives the region its name.
- Right tributaries of the Möhne and the lower reaches of the Ruhr play a rather small role in the extreme south by the Hellweg.

== Meaning ==
The area is occasionally called in German, the Münsterländische Bucht (Münsterland Bay), because a large part of this low-lying plain lies in central and eastern Münsterland. It is therefore used pars pro toto for the whole region.

The use of the term Bucht ("bay" or "bight") stems from the geological origin of the region which is half surrounded by the ridges of the Central Uplands. At one time it formed a bay in the coastline of the Cretaceous Sea the shape of which can be discerned from the topography.

== Population ==
The majority of the population of the Westphalian Lowland live in the area bordering the southern perimeter, in the region of the historic Hellweg east–west trade route through Germany, and especially in the northern Ruhr.

== Palaeontology ==
At various sites in the Westphalian Lowland giant ammonites have been found in Cretaceous layers of rock below the surface, for example when the underground railway network was being built in Dortmund. These cephalopods, with a shell diameter of more than two metres are the largest known invertebrates.

== See also ==
- Geography of Germany
- Natural regions of Germany
