= Soest Börde =

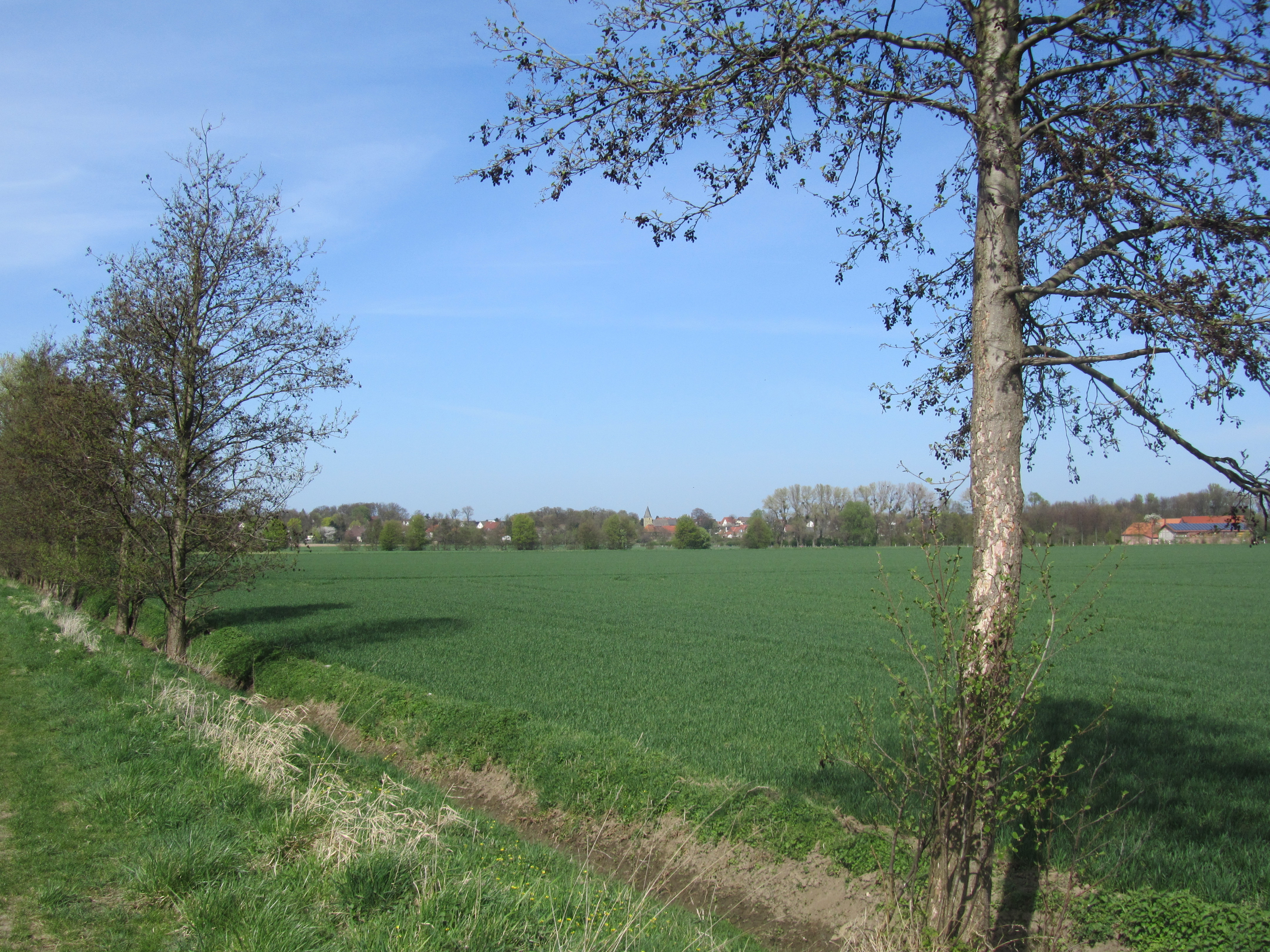
The Soest Börde between Schwefe and Borgeln

The Soest Börde (German: Soester Börde) is an historical territorial lordship and a cultural landscape in the centre of the German region of Westphalia, between Sauerland in the south and Münsterland in the north. It is known nationally for being a very fertile region thanks to the depth of its loess soils that, it terms of yield are only exceeded in Germany by the Magdeburg Börde.

The term "börde" has a twin meaning here. Administratively it refers to a former juridical district and agriculturally to a fertile lowland.

Historically-administratively the Soest Börde comprised the former territorial lordship of the town of Soest in the present municipalities of Soest, Bad Sassendorf and Welver. From a natural regional perspective, it belongs to the Hellwegbörden, whose eponymous centre it represents. Within the natural region classification, however, the Soest Börde, is not recognized as a unit. Instead the sub-regions of the Soest Upper and Lower Börde are used, the boundaries of which are not the same as the borders of the historical Soest Börde. The boundary between the two sub-regions runs just north of the Hellweg.

== See also ==
- Haarstrang
- Soest (district)

== Literature ==
- Klaus Diekmann: Die Herrschaft der Stadt Soest über ihre Börde. Diss. jur., Münster, 1962.
- Arnold Geck: Topographisch-historisch-statistische Beschreibung der Stadt Soest und der Soester Börde. Soest, 1825. 430 pages.
- Marga Koske: Das Bördekataster von 1685. Soest 1960.
- Marga Koske: Geschichte der eingemeindeten Soester Stadtteile. In: Soester Zeitschrift 112, 2000, pp. 23–78.
- Hermann Rothert: Wie die Stadt Soest ihr Territorium, die Börde, erwarb. In: Westfälische Zeitschrift 106, 1956, pp. 79–111.
- Hans Weller: Die Selbstverwaltung im Kreis Soest 1817–1974. Ein Beitrag zur Geschichte der übergemeindlichen Selbstverwaltung. Paderborn, 1987.
- Hartmut Witzig: Die Rechtsverhältnisse der Bauern in der Soester Börde vom 14. bis zum 18. Jahrhundert. Diss. jur., Göttingen, 1967.
