= Wolfgang Pagenstecher =

German painter

Wolfgang Pagenstecher (March 16, 1880 – December 26, 1953) was a German painter and heraldist. He was born in Elberfeld and died in Düsseldorf.

== Biography ==
Pagenstecher was born in Elberfeld, German Empire, on March 16, 1880, as the third son of Friedrich August Pagenstecher and Anna Elisabeth von Hurter. In 1898, he began studying at Kunstakademie Düsseldorf, with Ernst and Fritz Roeber, Peter Janssen, and Willy Spatz as his professors. During his time there he became an assistant before leaving to Florence in 1909. He spent a year there before traveling to the cities of Dresden, Paris, and Munich.

At the outbreak of World War I, in 1914, Pagenstecher joined the Imperial German Army reaching the rank of lieutenant. During the war he was seriously injured and spent time in captivity at Bordeaux. After the war, Pagenstecher began designing coat of arms. The most notable of which being the coat of arms of North Rhine-Westphalia

Pagenstecher died in Düsseldorf, West Germany on December 26, 1953.

== Coat of arms ==
Haan

Rheinisch-Bergischer Kreis

North Rhine-Westphalia

Wülfrath

Hilden
