= Soest Feud =

1444–1449 feud in modern-day Germany

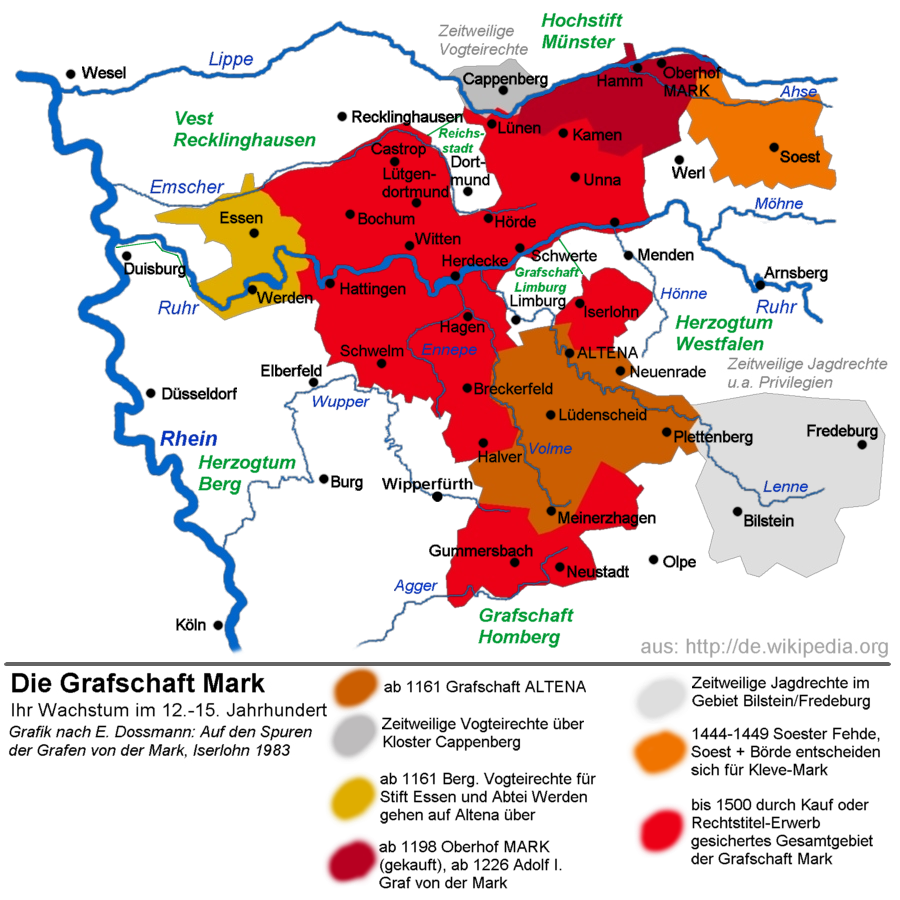
Territorial changes following the Soest Feud. In orange: Cleves-Mark wins Soest and the Soest Börde; in grey: Cleves-Mark loses its rights in Fredeburg and Bilstein

The Soest Feud (German: Soester Fehde), or Feud of Soest, was a feud that took place from 1444 to 1449 in which the town of Soest claimed its freedom from Archbishop Dietrich of Cologne (1414–1463), who tried to restore his rule. The town of Soest opposed this attempt on 5 June 1444 by accepting a new suzerain, John I, the Duke of Cleves-Mark, who guaranteed the town its old rights as well as new ones. As a result Emperor Frederick III imposed the imperial ban on the town. The victory of the town (as a result of the Archbishop of Cologne abandoning his attempt) meant that Soest had de facto more freedom than a free imperial city until it was annexed by Prussia, but at the same time it had to forfeit its economic power because it was now an enclave within Cologne's territory.

== Sources ==
- Joseph Hansen (ed.): The Chroniken der deutschen Städte vom 14. bis 16. Jahrhundert, Bd. 21: Soest. Leipzig, 1889 [reprint: Stuttgart, 1969]. incl: Kriegstagebuch der Soester Fehde (pp. 1–171), Werler Reimchronik der Soester Fehde (pp. 277–336), Lippstädter Reimchronik der Soester Fehde (pp. 173–275).
- Franz Winter: Quellenchronik zur Soester Fehde (= Veröffentlichungen des Stadtarchivs Soest, Vol. 20, ZDB-ID 2142953-4). Stadtarchiv Soest, Soest, 1997.
- Bartholomäus van der Lake: Geschichte der Soester Fehde („Historia der Twist Veede und Uneinicheit tuschen dem Hochwerdigesten in Got Vader, edelem wolgeboren Fursten und Heren, Heren Dyderyck [Dietrich von Moers] Ertzbyschop tho Collen, des hylligen romischen Rykes dorch Italien Ertzkentzeler Churfurst, Administrator des Stichtes Paderborne, Hertoge tho Engern und Westvalen, Grave tho Möerße an einer und der ersam und erlicken Stadt Soyst an ander Syden. Begint clarlich van Byschop Dyderyck.“) Soest [ohne Jahr] (Access to digital version).
- J. A. A. Moeller: The soestische Fehde oder Krieges-Geschichte des Erzbischofs Diederich zu Koeln mit der Stadt Soest : Aus einem original alt plattdeutschen Kriegstagebuch uebersetzt und mit Anmerkungen und Zusaetzen begleitet. Lippstadt, 1804 (digital version).
- Tobias Daniels: Die Soester Fehde im diplomatischen Wirken und den historiographischen Werken des Enea Silvio Piccolomini (Papst Pius II.). In: Soester Zeitschrift 124 (2012), pp. 35–53.
- Wolf-Herbert Deus: Die Soester Fehde. Festschrift der Stadt Soest zum 500. Jahrestage der Beendigung der Soester Fehde am 27. April 1949 (= Soester wissenschaftliche Beiträge, Bd. 2, ISSN 0171-3752). Ritter (in Kommission), Soest, 1949.
- Heinz-Dieter Heimann: Die Soester Fehde. Geschichte einer erstrittenen Stadtfreiheit. Westfälische Verlags-Buchhandlung Mocker & Jahn, Soest, 2003, ISBN 3-87902-216-X.
- Heinz-Dieter Heimann, Uwe Tresp (ed.): Thüringische und böhmische Söldner in der Soester Fehde. Quellen zum landesherrlichen Militärwesen im 15. Jahrhundert aus thüringischen und sächsischen Archiven (= Quellen und Studien zur History und Kultur Brandenburg-Preußens und des Alten Reiches). Verlag für Berlin-Brandenburg, Potsdam, 2002, ISBN 3-935035-35-7.
- Heinz-Dieter Heimann: Die Soester Fehde (1444–1449). In: Harm Klueting (ed.): Das Herzogtum Westfalen, Vol. 1: Das kölnische Herzogtum Westfalen von den Anfängen der Kölner Herrschaft im südlichen Westfalen bis zur Säkularisation 1803. Münster, 2009, ISBN 978-3-402-12827-5, pp. 321–342.
