= Lower Rhine Heights =

Coordinates: 51°38′30″N 6°21′30″E

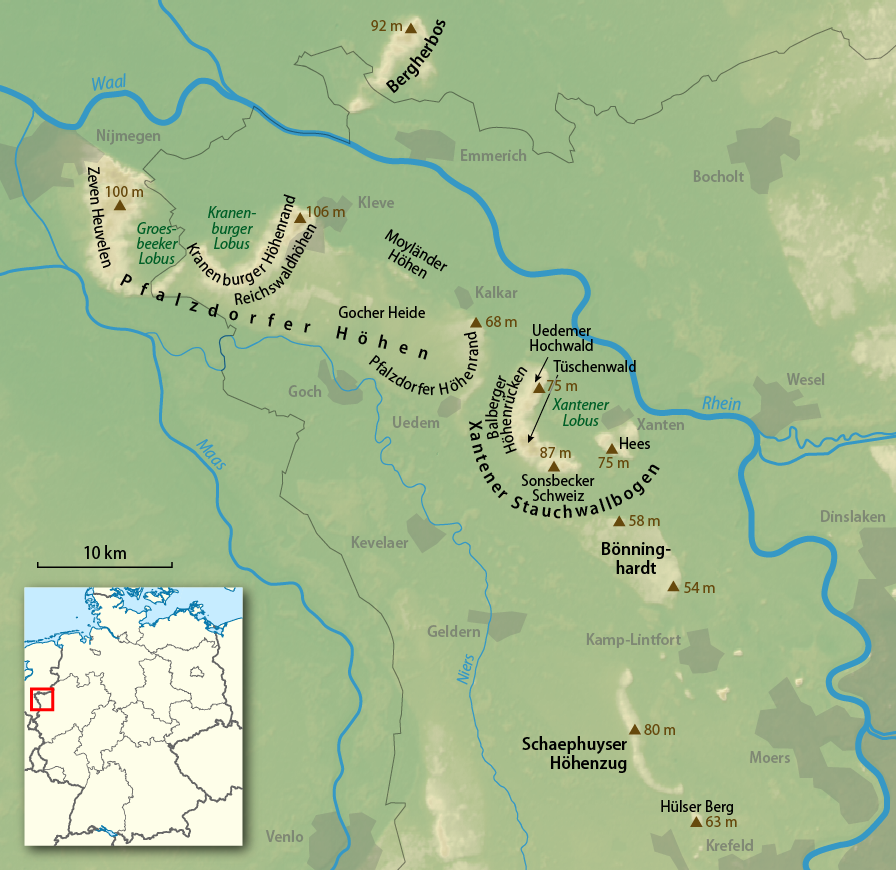
Relief map of Lower Rhine Heights

The Lower Rhine Heights (German: Niederrheinischer Höhenzug) is a hill ridge which, with several interruptions, stretches in a broad arc through the Lower Rhine Plain from Krefeld to Nijmegen, between the valley of the Rhine in the east and that of the Niers in the west. This landform element is also called the Lower Rhine Hill Ridge.

The sandhills, which in some places reach around hundred meters in height (Klever Berg (106 m)) and protrude more than sixty meters above the surrounding river terraces of the Lower Rhine, originated in the penultimate glacial period (the Saale glaciation) as terminal moraine ridges from glaciers advancing from the northeast. Two of the glacial termini formed the glacial basins of Groesbeek and Kranenburg, resulting in the distinctly recognizable typical W-shaped ridge between Nijmegen and Kleve.
