= Lower Rhine Plain =

Coordinates: 51°32′10″N 6°21′37″E

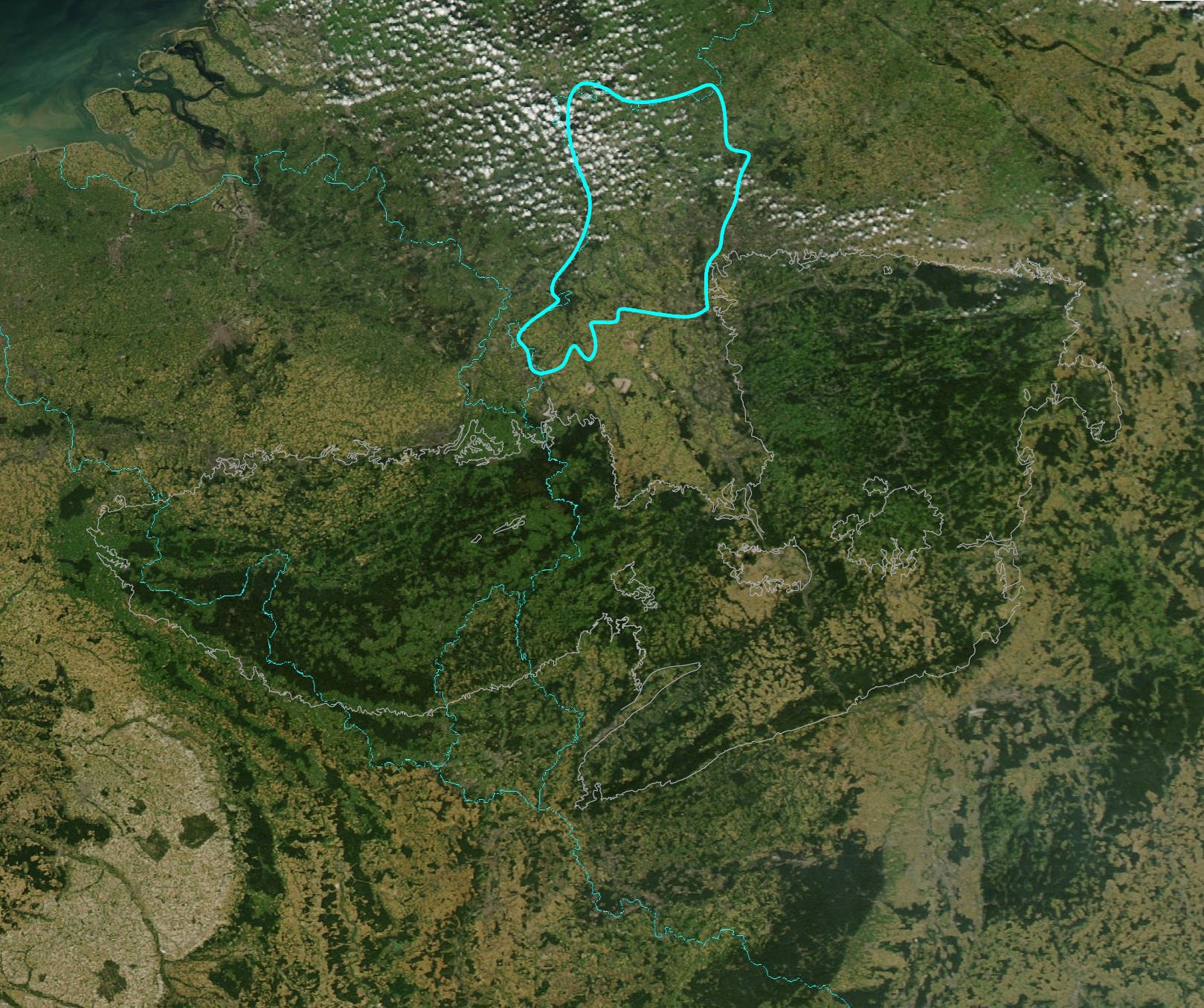
Satellite photograph of the Lower Rhine Plain

The Lower Rhine Plain (German: Niederrheinisches Tiefland) is one of the natural regions of Germany and lies on either side of the Rhine north of the city of Düsseldorf.

== Geography ==
The Lower Rhine Plain is bordered in the south by the Lower Rhine Bay and Cologne Lowland, in the southeast by the Bergisches Land, to the east and northeast by the Westphalian Basin and in the west by the Netherlands.

The Lower Rhine Plain is an extensively terraced landscape. The otherwise level terraces are interrupted by various features like the V-shaped valleys, flood plains, old river courses or the terminal moraine ridges of the Lower Rhine Heights. The height of the terrain is under 100m above NN almost everywhere.

== Geology ==
The Lower Rhine Plain is the northern half of the geological structure known as the Lower Rhine Bay (Niederrheinische Bucht). Its geology was probably a result of deposition in the last 30 million years, which has given rise to sediments and layers of sedimentary rock in this plain up to 1,300 m thick.

== Climate ==
Annual precipitation in the area is between 700 and 750mm and the average annual temperature is between 9.5 and 10.5 °C. The area benefits from a 'North Atlantic' climate with mild winters and a long growing season.

== See also ==
- Geography of Germany
- Natural regions of Germany
