= Lower Rhine Bay =

Lowland plain in North Rhine-Westphalia, Germany

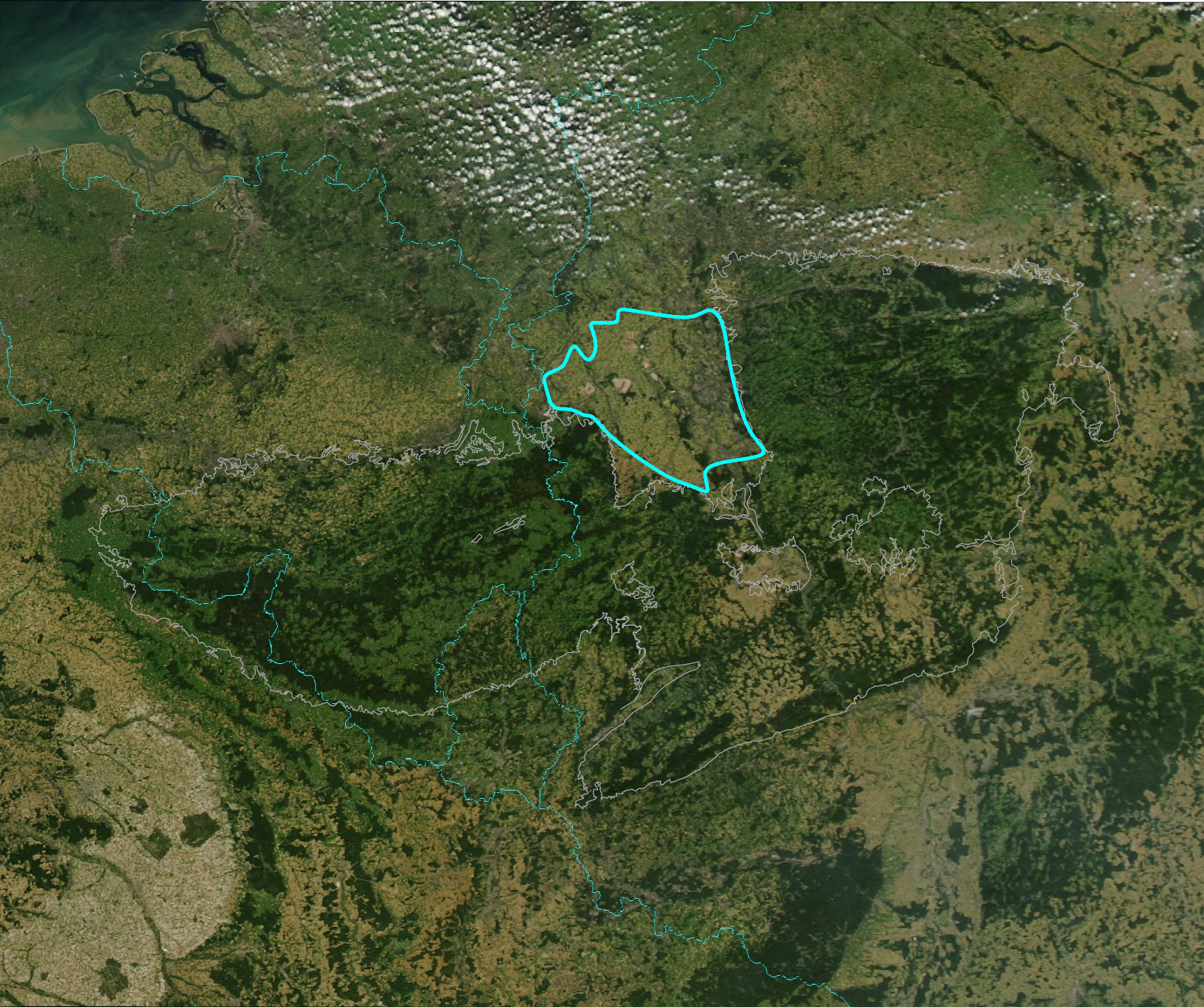
Satellite image of the Lower Rhine Bay

The Lower Rhine Bay (German: Niederrheinische Bucht), sometimes called the Lower Rhine Bight, is a lowland plain in the German state of North Rhine-Westphalia that cuts into the Rhenish Massif. From a natural region perspective it is a major unit group which includes the Cologne Lowland around the city of Cologne as well as the land lying to the west and, in a clearly narrower strip of land, to the east of the central Cologne plain. That said, the term "Cologne Bay" or "Cologne Bight" is occasionally used, pars pro toto, for the entire region.

The Lower Rhine Bay covers an area of 3,584.4 km².

== Location and boundaries ==
The Lower Rhine Bay is bordered to the east by the Berg Plateaux (Bergische Hochflächen), the western slopes of the Süder Uplands in the historic Bergisches Land. To the south, are the Lower Middle Rhine region including the Pleiser Hills, Siebengebirge and Lower Middle Rhine Valley, to the southwest is the Eifel.

To the north, the loess strip forms the boundary with the Lower Rhine Plain.

The surface of the landscape is flat or gently rolling and divided by tectonically-formed ridges and valleys that mainly run from southeast to northwest. Characteristic of the area is the blanket of loess west of the Rhine deposited by the prevailing westerly winds from the Meuse gravels and the heathland east of the river which is covered with coarse-grained sands.
