= Flag of North Rhine-Westphalia =

German state flag

North Rhine-Westphalia
- Landesflagge
- Use: Civil flag and ensign
- Proportion: 3:5 (or 1:2)
- Adopted: 1953 (in use from 1948)
- Design: A horizontal tricolour of green, white, and red.
- Landesdienstflagge
- Use: State flag
- Proportion: 3:5 (or 1:2)
- Adopted: 1953 (in use from 1948)
- Design: The civil flag with the addition of the coat of arms.

The flag of the German State of North Rhine-Westphalia is a horizontal tricolor consisting of green, white and red.

== Design ==
After the establishment of North Rhine-Westphalia in 1946, the tricolor was first introduced in 1948, but was not formally adopted until 1953. The plain variant of the tricolor is considered the civil flag and state ensign, while government authorities use the state flag (Landesdienstflagge) which is defaced with the state's coat of arms.

The flag is a combination of the two former provinces of Prussia that comprise most of the state: the Rhine Province and Westphalia. The state ensign can easily be mistaken for the flag of Hungary, as well as the former civil flag of Iran (Persia) (1910–1980) and the flag of the Parti patriote. The same flag was used by the Rhenish Republic (1923–1924) as a symbol of independence and freedom.

Flags from preceding Prussian provinces:
Rhine Province (1822–1946)	Westphalia (1815–1946)

=== Colors ===
The "Law on the State Colors, the State Coat of Arms and the State Flag" defines the "state colors" as simply "green-white-red", with no further specifications. On 2 June 1999, the federal cabinet introduced a corporate design for the German government which defined "green" as RGB 0,133,74 or PANTONE® 7731, and red as RGB 0,119,182 or PANTONE® 307, but it is unclear if these guidelines apply to the states, and in any case, in practice the specific shades can vary wildly, especially in unofficial uses.

Colour scheme	Green	Red
CMYK	100.0.100.20	0.100.65.10
CMYK	85.0.100.0 (Note: For newspapers.)	0.100.60.0
Pantone (approximation)	7731	200
Decimal RGB	0,133,74	192,0,60

== History ==
Electorate of Trier (898–1801)

Free Imperial City of Aachen (1166–1801)

Prince-Bishopric of Münster (1770–1803)

Cisrhenian Republic (1797)

County of Dülmen (1803–1806)

Arenberg (1803–1810)

Principality of Salm (1802–1811)

Grand Duchy of Berg (1806–1808)

Rhine Province (1822–1946)

Province of Westphalia (1815–1946)

Principality of Lippe (c.1858–1880)

Principality of Lippe (1880–1918) and Free State of Lippe (1918–1947)

Rhenish Republic (1923–1924)

== See also ==
- Flags of German states
