= Armorial of districts in North Rhine-Westphalia =

List of coats of arms of the districts in North Rhine-Westphalia, Germany

Aachen (district)	Borken	Cleves (Kleve)	Coesfeld
Düren	Ennepe-Ruhr	Euskirchen	Gütersloh
Heinsberg	Herford	Hochsauerland	Höxter
Lippe	Märkischer Kreis	Mettmann	Minden-Lübbecke
Neuss	Oberbergischer Kreis	Olpe	Paderborn
Recklinghausen	Rhein-Erft-Kreis	Rhein-Sieg	Rheinisch-Bergischer Kreis
Siegen-Wittgenstein	Soest	Steinfurt	Unna
Viersen	Warendorf	Wesel
