= Haar (Westphalia) =

Hill ridge in Germany

- Location within North Rhine-Westphalia

Highest point
- Peak: Spitze Warte
- Elevation: 391 m above NN

Dimensions
- Area: 300 km^{2} (120 mi^{2})

Geography
- Country: Germany
- State: North Rhine-Westphalia
- Range coordinates: 51°30′56″N 8°26′47″E
- Parent range: Hellweg Börde

Geology
- Rock type(s): limestones from the Turonian and Cenomanian stages

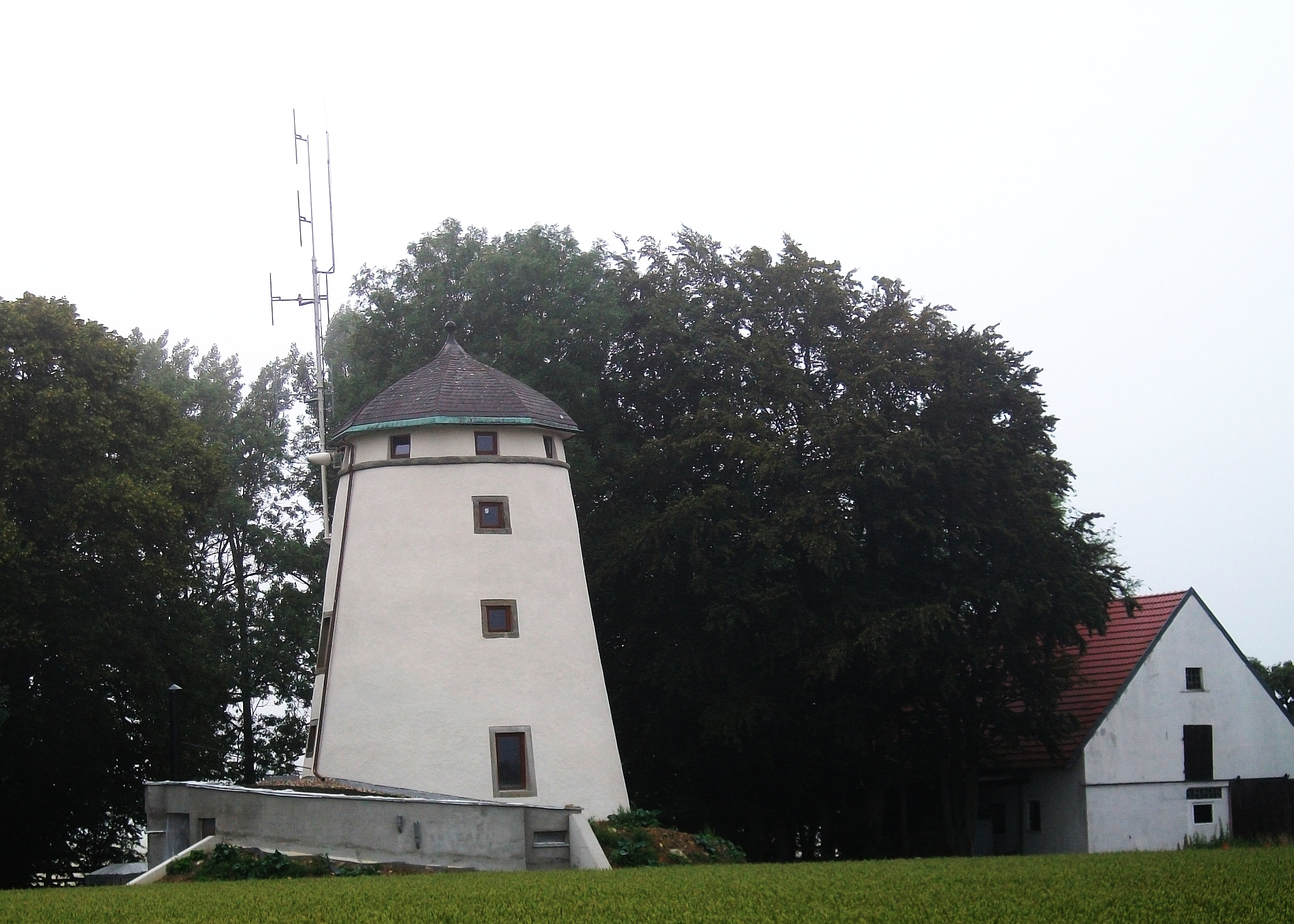
Spitze Warte

The Haar (German pronunciation: [ˈhaːɐ̯]) or Haarstrang is a ridge of hills on the southern edge of the Westphalian Basin in the German state of North Rhine-Westphalia. From a natural region perspective it is the southern, submontane part of the Hellweg Börde, which stands opposite the northern area of the Süder Uplands (which is the natural region of the Sauerland), north of the Möhne and Ruhr rivers.

Its highest elevation is the 391 m high Spitze Warte, which is situationed near Rüthen-Hemmern at the eastern end of the Haarstrang. Further west the crest of the ridge reaches heights of generally 200 to 250 m above sea level (NN) and rises to about 100 to 150 m over the Ruhr and Möhne valleys in the south as well as the valley of the Lippe in the north separated by the Upper and Lower Hellweg, both parts of the Hellweg Börde.
