= Westphalia =

State part and historic region of North Rhine-Westphalia, Germany

Westphalia Westfalen
- State part and historic region of North Rhine-Westphalia
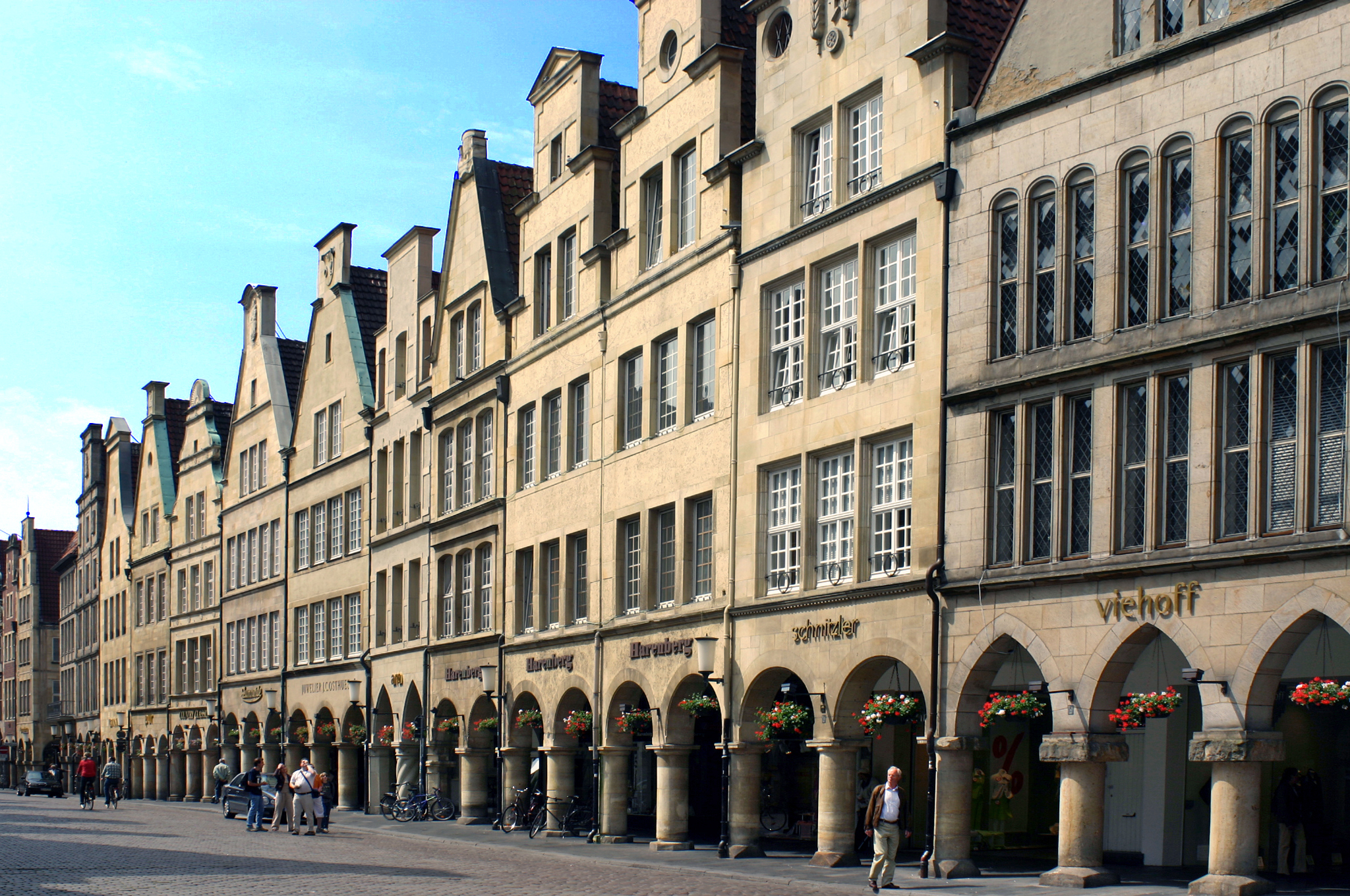
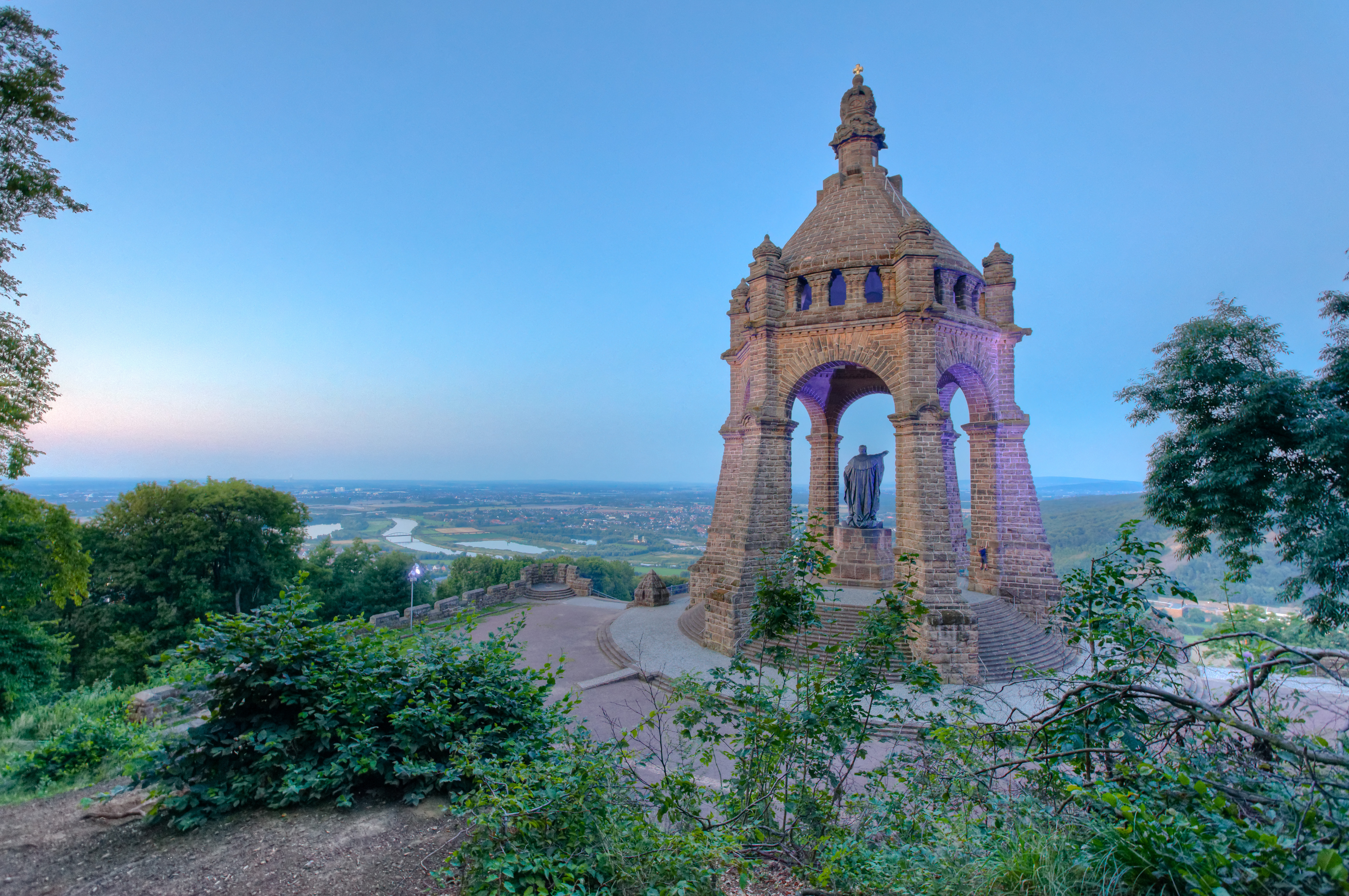
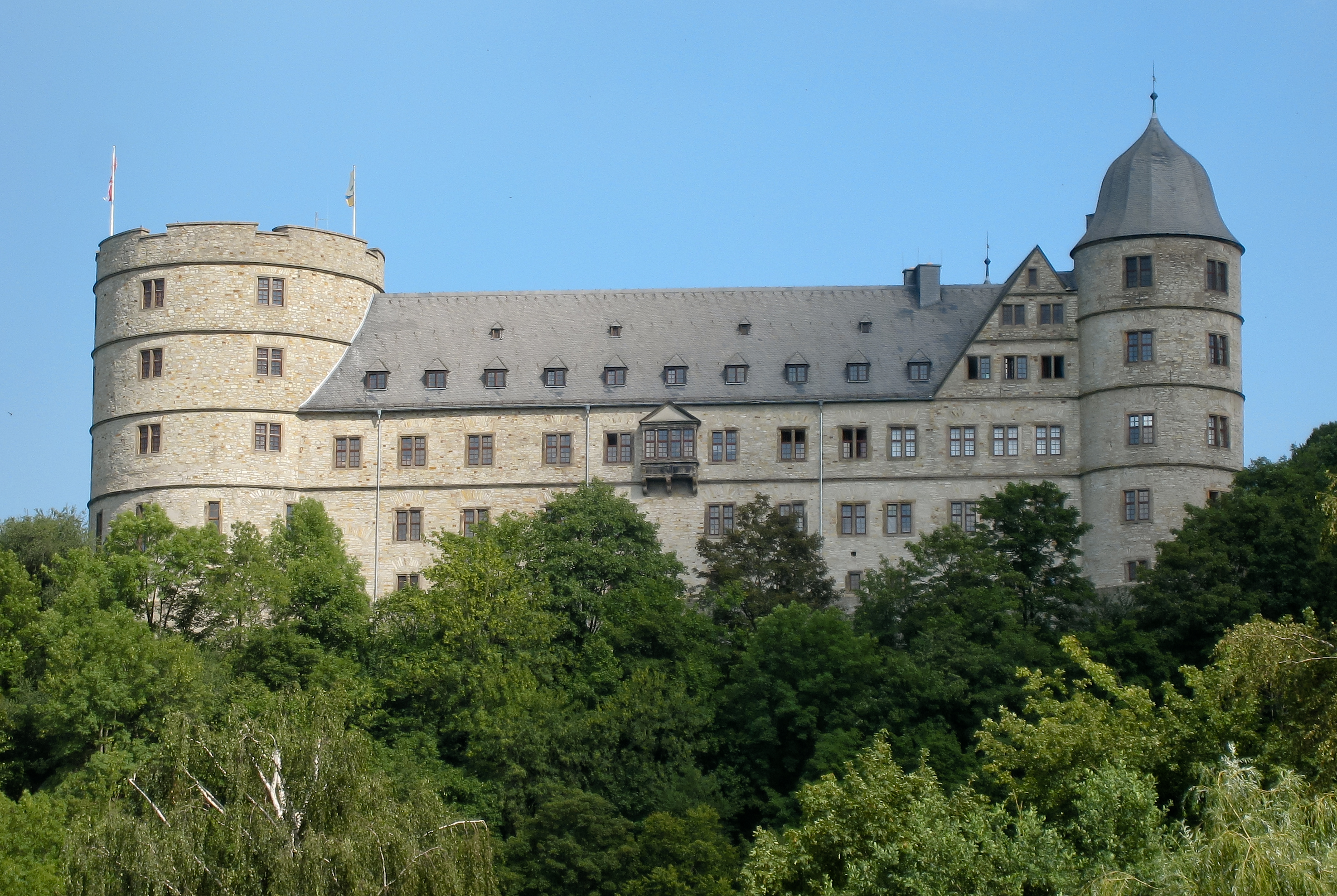
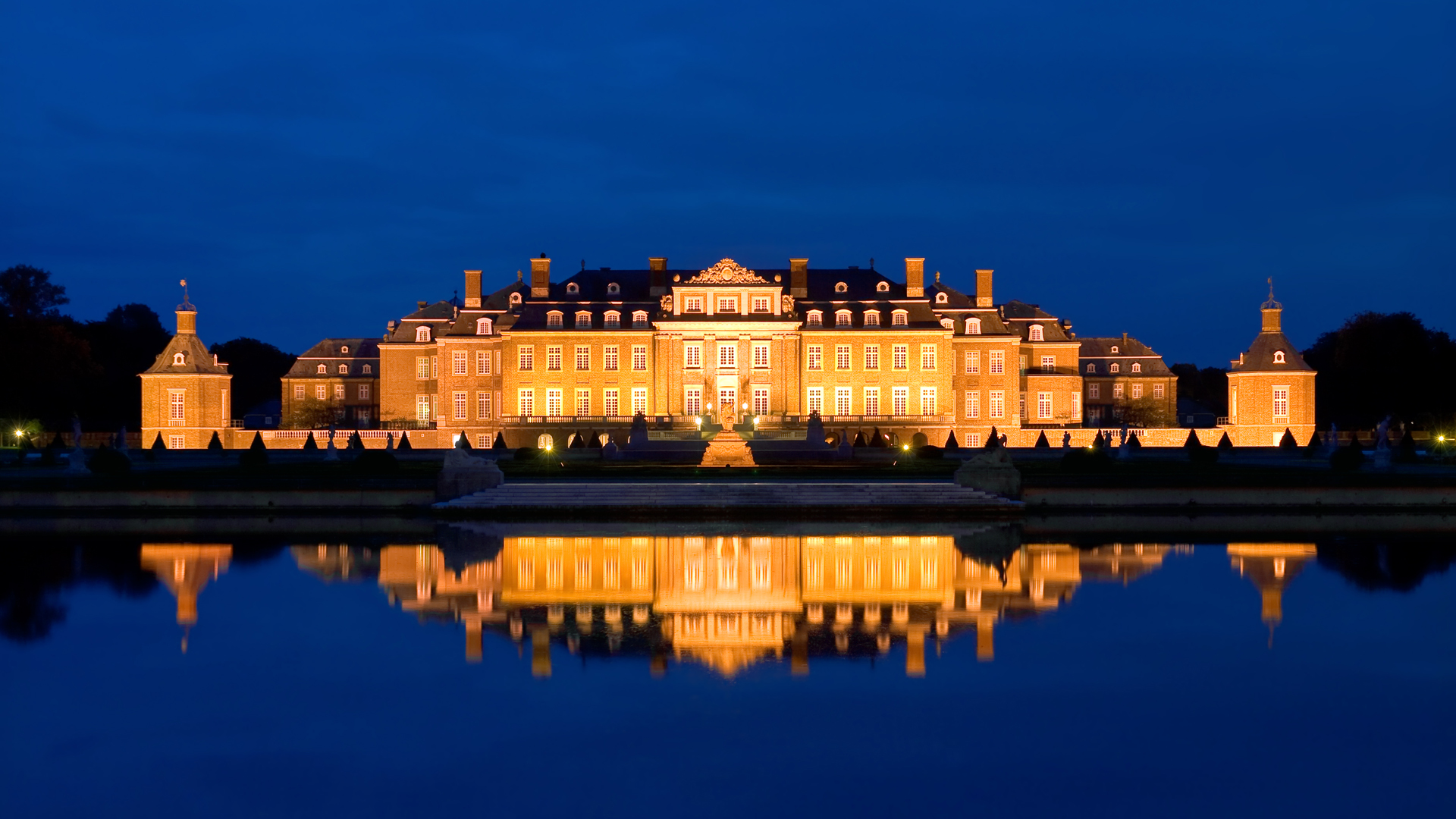
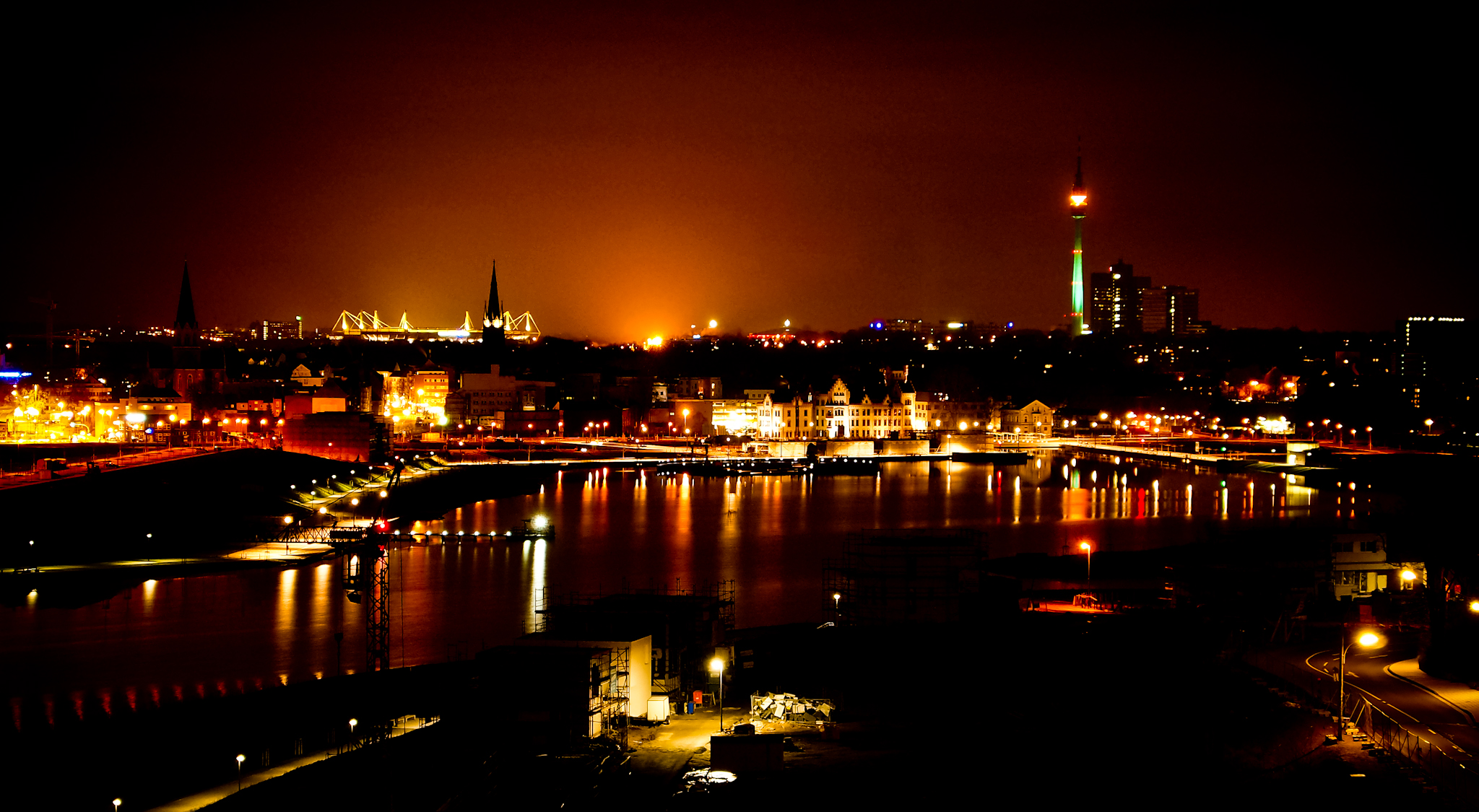
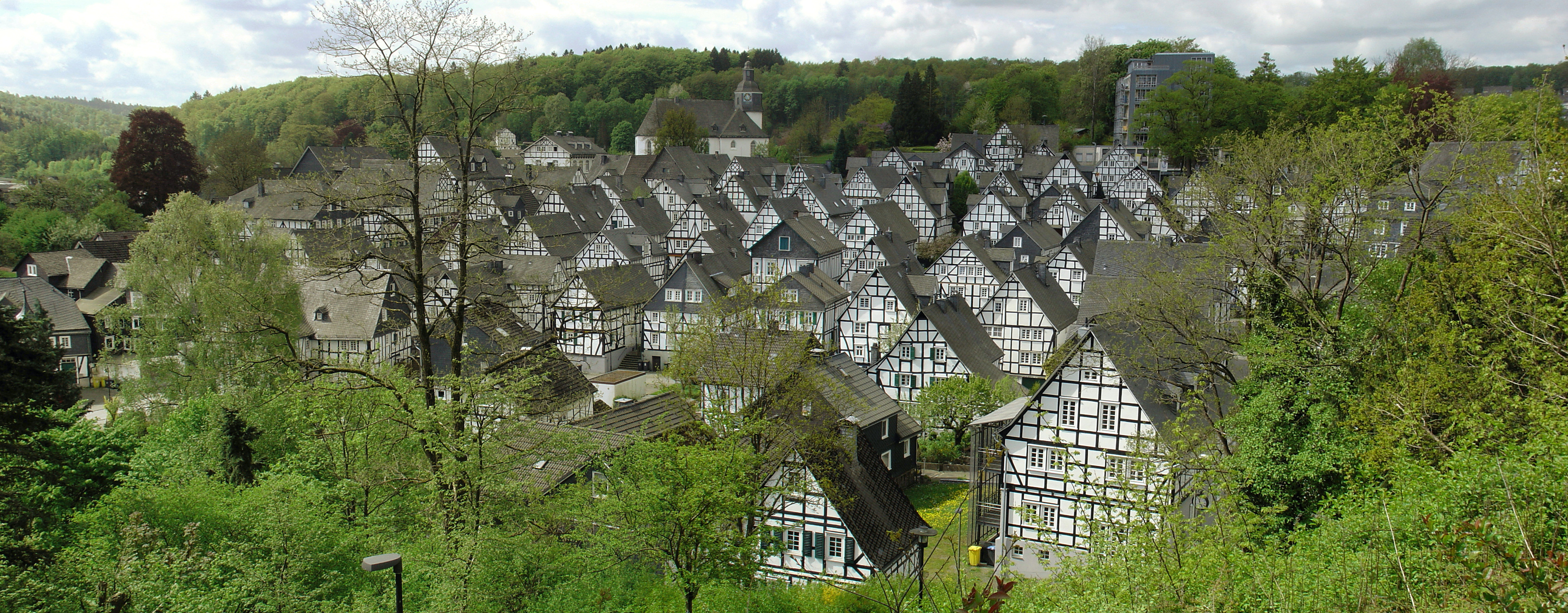
- Prinzipalmarkt in Münster (1st row), Emperor William Monument at the Porta Westfalica and Wewelsburg castle (2nd row), Nordkirchen Castle and skyline of Dortmund (3rd row), town centre of Freudenberg (4th row)

- Flag Coat of arms
- Anthem: Westfalenlied
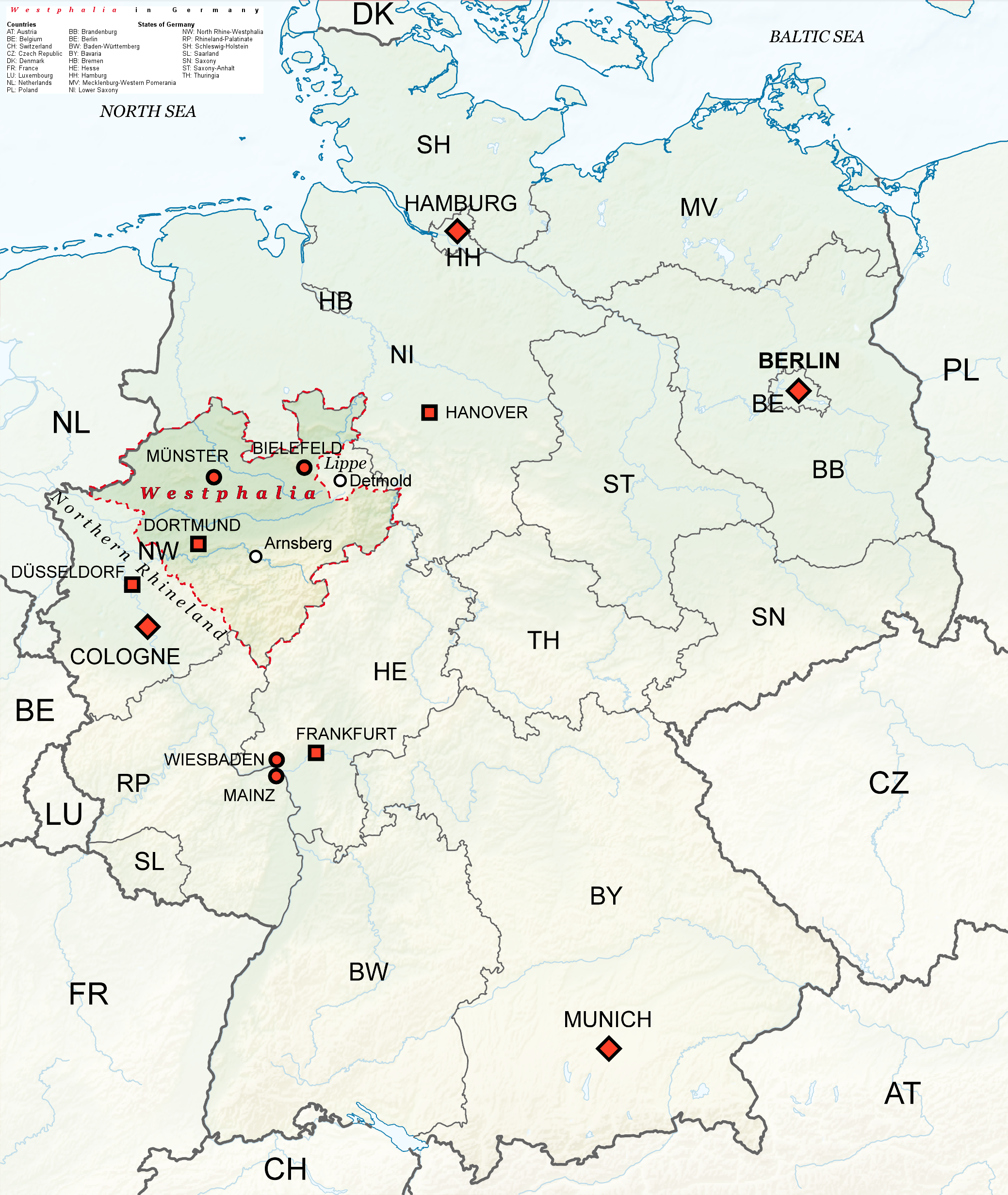
- Location of Westphalia in Germany

- Westphalia in the state of North Rhine-Westphalia borders on the Northern Rhineland in the west and Lippe in the northeast.
- Coordinates (Geographic centre of Westphalia): 51°36′30″N 7°56′00″E
- Country: Germany
- State: North Rhine-Westphalia
- Governmental districts: 3: Arnsberg; Detmold; Münster
- Districts and independent cities: 26: Borken; Coesfeld; Ennepe-Ruhr-Kreis; Gütersloh; Herford; Hochsauerlandkreis; Höxter; Märkischer Kreis; Minden-Lübbecke; Olpe; Paderborn; Recklinghausen; Siegen-Wittgenstein; Soest; Steinfurt; Unna; Warendorf; Bielefeld; Bochum; Bottrop; Dortmund; Gelsenkirchen; Hagen; Hamm; Herne; Münster
- Further cities, towns and municipalities: 206
- Founded: 30 April 1815 (Province of Westphalia; other predecessors existed since the Early Middle Ages.); 23 August 1946 (as a part of North Rhine-Westphalia)

Area
  - Total: 20,210 km^{2} (7,803 sq mi)
- Highest elevation: 843 m (2,766 ft)

Population (31 December 2018)
  - Total: 7,913,035
  - Density: 391.5/km^{2} (1,014/sq mi)
- Demonym(s): Persons: the Westphalian (der Westfale [male] / die Westfälin [female]), the Westphalians (die Westfalen); Adjective: Westphalian (westfälisch)
- Time zone: UTC+01:00 (Central European Time (CET))
  - Summer (DST): UTC+02:00 (Central European Summer Time (CEST))

Westphalia (/wɛstˈfeɪliə/; German: Westfalen [vɛstˈfaːlən]; Low German: Westfålen [vεs(t)ˈfɔːln]) is a cultural region of northwestern Germany, former province of Prussia, and one of the three historic parts of the state of North Rhine-Westphalia. It has an area of 20,210 square kilometres (7,800 sq mi) and 7.9 million inhabitants. It lies to the west of its counterpart, Eastphalia.

The territory of the region is almost identical with the historic Province of Westphalia, which was a part of the Kingdom of Prussia from 1815 to 1918 and the Free State of Prussia from 1918 to 1946. In 1946, Westphalia merged with North Rhine, another former part of Prussia, to form the newly created state of North Rhine-Westphalia. In 1947, the state with its two historic parts was joined by a third one: Lippe, a former principality and free state.

The seventeen districts and nine independent cities of Westphalia and the single district of Lippe are members of the Westphalia-Lippe Regional Association (Landschaftsverband Westfalen-Lippe).

Previous to the formation of Westphalia as a province of Prussia and later state part of North Rhine-Westphalia, the term "Westphalia" was applied to different territories of different sizes such as the western part of the ancient Duchy of Saxony, the Duchy of Westphalia or the Kingdom of Westphalia. The Westphalian language, a variant of the Low German language, is spoken beyond modern Westphalia's borders in neighbouring southwestern Lower Saxony and northwestern Hesse.

== Geography ==
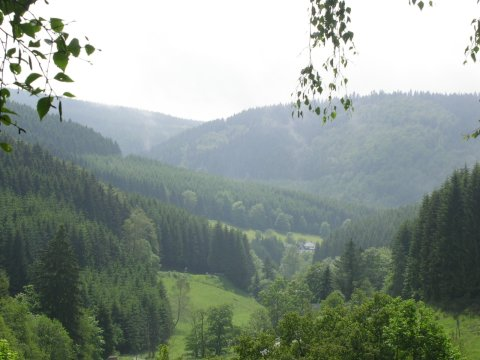
The Sauerland mountainous landscape

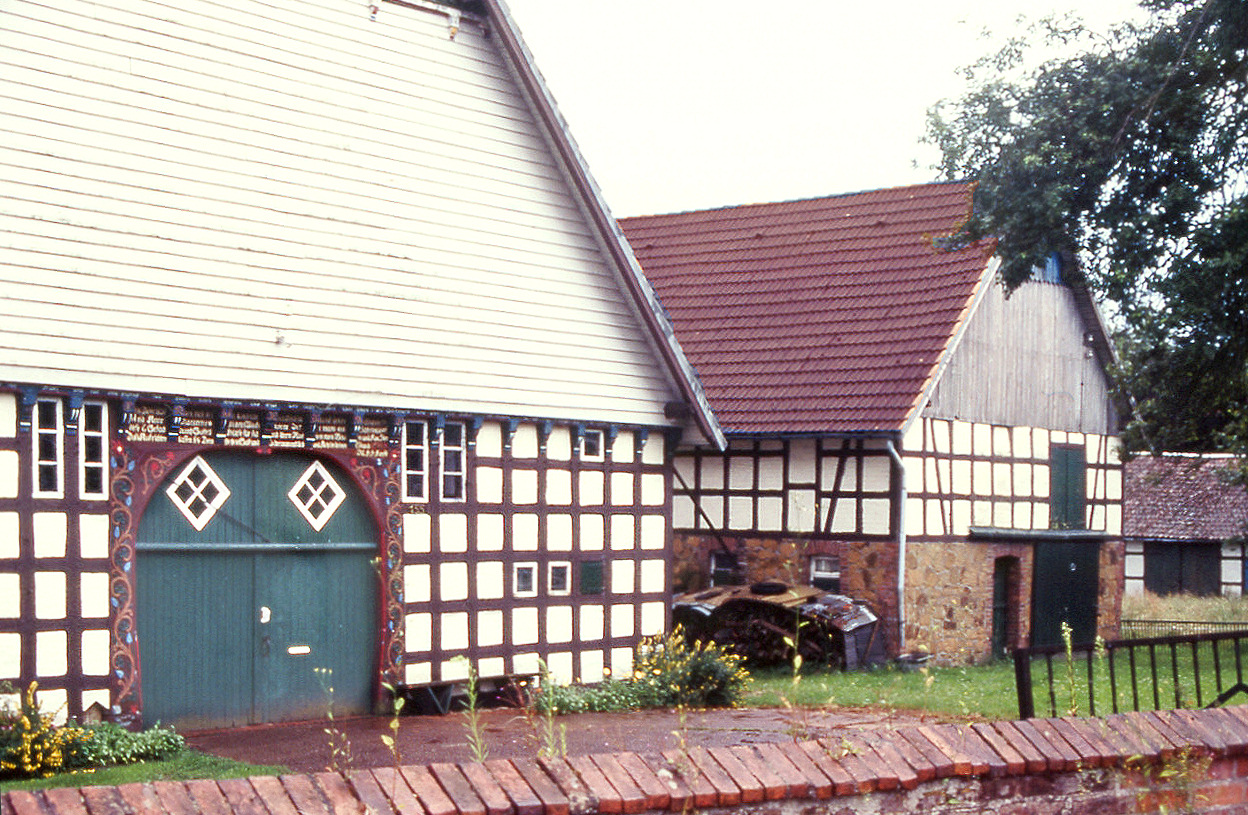
Typical Westphalian houses

=== Landscapes ===
Being a part of the North German Plain, most of Westphalia's north is flat. In the south the German Central Uplands emerge. Westphalia is divided into the following landscapes.

Flat to hilly (498 m or 1,634 ft and under): East Westphalia, Münsterland, eastern Ruhr Metropolitan Area, Tecklenburg Land, Westphalian Hellweg

Hilly to mountainous (up to 843 m or 2,766 ft): Westphalian part of the Sauerland, Siegerland, Wittgenstein

=== Largest cities ===
Eastern Ruhr Metropolitan Area

- Dortmund
- Bochum
- Gelsenkirchen
- Hagen
- Hamm
- Herne
- Bottrop
- Recklinghausen

East Westphalia

- Bielefeld
- Paderborn
- Gütersloh

Münsterland

- Münster

Siegerland

- Siegen

=== Rivers ===
Westphalia is roughly the region in between the rivers Rhine and Weser, located both north and south of the Ruhr River. Other important rivers are the Ems and the Lippe.

=== Mountains ===
The Langenberg (843 m or 2,766 ft) and the Kahler Asten (842 m or 2,762 ft) in the Sauerland part of the Rothaar Mountains are Westphalia's and also North Rhine-Westphalia's highest mountains.

=== Westphalia and Eastphalia ===
The term "Westphalia" contrasts with the much less used term "Eastphalia", which roughly covers the southeastern part of the present-day state of Lower Saxony, western Saxony-Anhalt and northern Thuringia.

=== Division ===
Westphalia is divided into three governmental districts. These are subdivided into further districts and independent cities.

All districts and independent cities of the governmental districts of Arnsberg and Münster are considered to be a part of Westphalia as a historic region. The District of Lippe as successor of the Free State of Lippe in the Governmental District of Detmold is rather considered to be a separate historic region.

Governmental District of Arnsberg
3,582,497 inhabitants (as of 31 December 2018)
8,010 km^{2} (3,094 sq mi)
(all districts and independent cities)

- City of Bochum
- City of Dortmund
- Ennepe-Ruhr District (Ennepe-Ruhr-Kreis)
- City of Hagen
- City of Hamm
- City of Herne
- High Sauerland District (Hochsauerlandkreis)
- Markish District (Märkischer Kreis)
- District of Olpe
- District of Siegen-Wittgenstein
- District of Soest
- District of Unna

Governmental District of Detmold
1,706,919 inhabitants (as of 31 December 2018)
5,280 km^{2} (2,038 sq mi)
(all districts and independent cities except District of Lippe)

- City of Bielefeld
- District of Gütersloh
- District of Herford
- District of Höxter
- District of Minden-Lübbecke
- District of Paderborn

Governmental District of Münster
2,623,619 inhabitants (as of 31 December 2018)
6,920 km^{2} (2,671 sq mi)
(all districts and independent cities)

- District of Borken
- City of Bottrop
- District of Coesfeld
- City of Gelsenkirchen
- City of Münster
- District of Recklinghausen
- District of Steinfurt
- District of Warendorf

== Symbols ==
Westphalia (present)	North Rhine-Westphalia (present)
	Civil flag	Government flag
Province of Westphalia (historical)
Lower Saxony (present)

=== Coat of arms ===
==== Current use ====
The traditional symbol of Westphalia is the Westphalian Steed: a white horse on a red field. It is derived from the Saxon Steed in the coat of arms of the medieval Duchy of Saxony which most of today's Westphalia was part of. In official contexts the coat of arms of Westphalia is being used by the Westphalia-Lippe Regional Association, which represents these two historic parts of North Rhine-Westphalia.

The coat of arms of North Rhine-Westphalia uses the Westphalian Steed to represent Westphalia as one of its parts alongside the Lippish Rose representing Lippe and the Rhine River representing the Northern Rhineland.

==== Previous use ====
Prussia already used the Westphalian Steed in the coat of arms of its Province of Westphalia.

==== Similar versions ====
The coat of arms of Lower Saxony uses a different version of the Saxon Steed since the state also covers large parts of the Old Saxons' duchy.

=== Flag ===
==== Current use ====
The colours of Westphalia are white and red. The flag of the Westphalia-Lippe Regional Association uses these colours with the Westphalian coat of arms in its centre.

The flag of North Rhine-Westphalia is a combination of the Northern Rhineland's colours green/white and the Westphalian white/red.

==== Previous use ====
The flag of the Prussian Province of Westphalia already displayed the colours white and red.

==== Similar versions ====
The flag of Lower Saxony shows the colours of Germany and the Saxon Steed.

=== Anthem ===
Composed in Iserlohn in 1886 by Emil Rittershaus, the Westfalenlied is an unofficial anthem of Westphalia.

A recording of Westfalenlied

== Identity ==
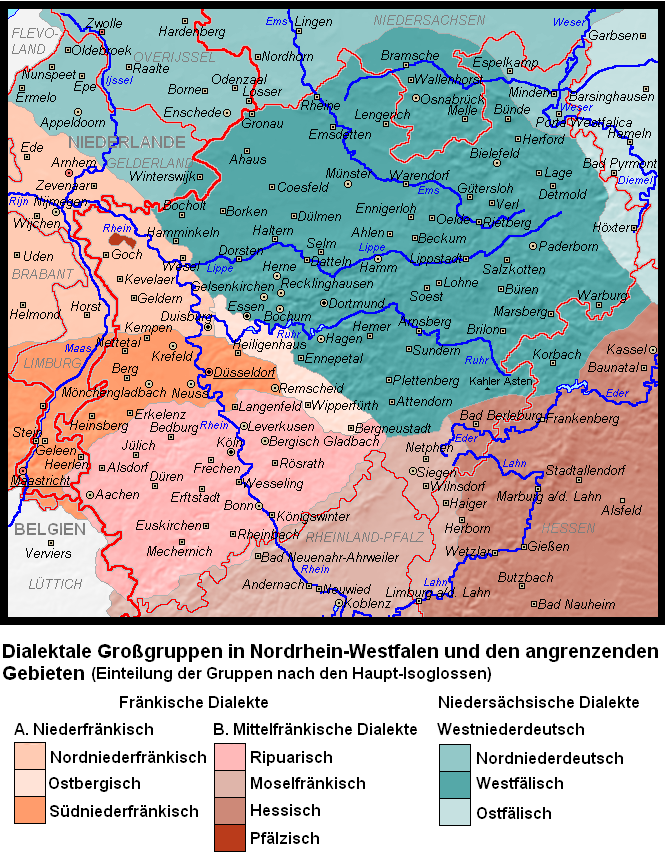
Dialects in North Rhine-Westphalia: Central Franconian and Low Franconian dialects in red, Low German dialects in blue.

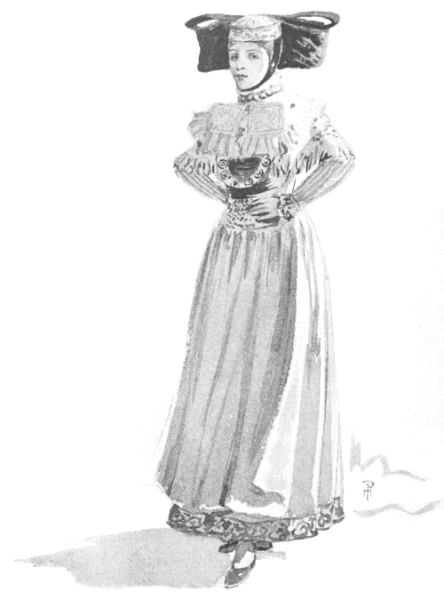
Westphalian (German) ladies peasant costume – illustration by Percy Anderson for Costume Fanciful, Historical and Theatrical, 1906

While the Northern Rhineland, Westphalia and Lippe are different historic territories of today's North Rhine-Westphalia, the old border between the former Rhine Province and the Province of Westphalia is also a language border. While in Westphalia and Lippe, people tend to speak West Low German dialects and especially the Westphalian variant of the Low German language, Central German and Low Franconian dialects are spoken in the Northern Rhineland.

These different regional identities are often being emphasized by different majorities of denomination between Roman Catholics and Lutheran Protestants. The different majorities date back to the days of the territorial fragmentation of the Holy Roman Empire (of the German Nation) which existed until 1806. The Münsterland and the region around Paderborn for instance are still mainly Catholic regions because of the former existence of the prince-bishoprics of Münster and Paderborn. The mainly Reformed Lippe was even able to retain its independence as a small state within Germany in the form of a principality until 1918 and as a free state until 1946. This continues to influence the identity of its people who often distinguish themselves from neighbouring regions such as East Westphalia.

In addition to these historic, lingual and religious aspects, there are some regional differences in culture and mentality. That is why many of the citizens of North Rhine-Westphalia rather see themselves either as "Rhinelanders", "Westphalians" or "Lippers" rather than as "North Rhine-Westphalians".

== History ==
Westphalia is known for the 1648 Peace of Westphalia which ended the Thirty Years' War, as the two treaties were signed in Münster and Osnabrück.

It is one of the regions that were part of all incarnations of the German state since the Early Middle Ages: the Holy Roman Empire, the Confederation of the Rhine, the German Confederation, the North German Confederation, the German Empire, the Weimar Republic and National Socialist Germany. After World War II it was a part of the British occupation zone which merged with the American zone to become the Bizone in 1947 and again merged with the French zone to become the Trizone in 1948. The current Federal Republic of Germany was founded on these territories making Westphalia a part of West Germany. It is a part of united Germany since 1990.

=== Roman incursion ===
Around AD 1 there were numerous incursions through Westphalia and perhaps even some permanent Roman or Romanized settlements. The Battle of the Teutoburg Forest took place near Osnabrück, which at this time was a place of settlement of the Westphalians, who were a part of the Germanic tribe of the Saxons. Some of the tribes who fought at this battle came from the area of Westphalia.

=== Charlemagne ===
Charlemagne is thought to have spent considerable time in Paderborn and nearby parts. His Saxon Wars also partly took place in what is thought of as Westphalia today. Popular legends link his adversary Widukind to places near Detmold, Bielefeld, Lemgo, Osnabrück and other places in Westphalia. Widukind was buried in Enger, which is also a subject of a legend.

=== Middle Ages ===
Westphalia within Saxony c. 1000 CE: Westphalia Other parts of Saxony Rest of the German Kingdom

Along with Eastphalia, Angria and Nordalbingia, Westphalia (Westfalahi) was originally a district of the Duchy of Saxony. At the time, large portions of its territory in the north lay in what today is Lower Saxony. Following the deposition of the Saxon duke Henry the Lion in 1180 and the subsequent belittlement of the duchy, Westphalia was elevated to a duchy in its own right by Emperor Barbarossa. The Duchy of Westphalia comprised only a small area south of the Lippe River.

Modern Westphalia was a part of the Lower Rhenish–Westphalian Circle of the Holy Roman Empire, which comprised territories of Lower Lorraine, Frisia and parts of the former Duchy of Saxony.

=== Early modern era ===
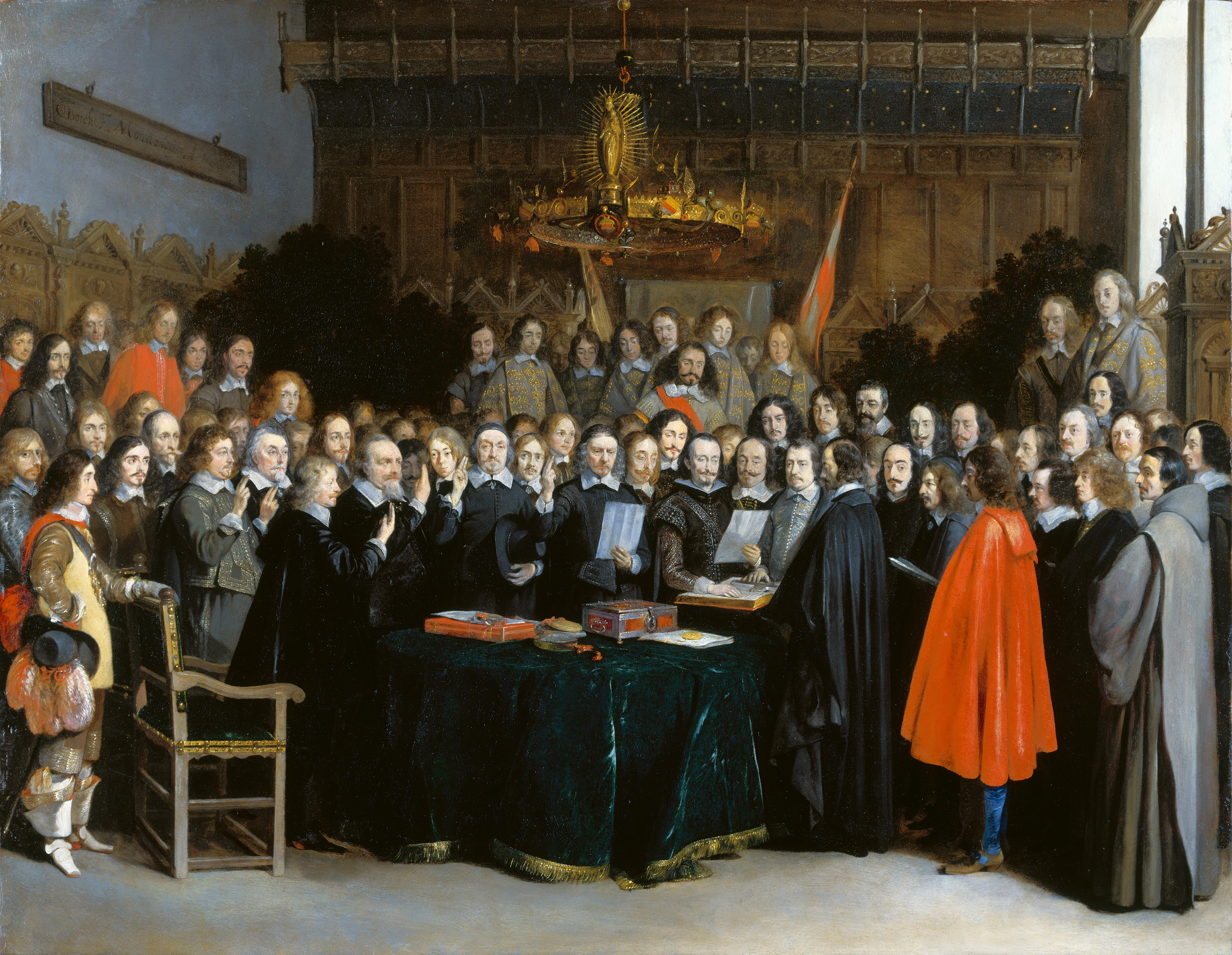
Ratification of the Peace of Westphalia of 1648 in Münster by Gerard Terborch (1617–1681)

As a result of the Protestant Reformation, there was no dominant religion in Westphalia. Roman Catholicism and Lutheranism were on a relatively equal footing. Lutheranism was strong in the eastern and northern parts with numerous free churches. Münster and especially Paderborn were considered to be Catholic. Osnabrück was divided almost equally between Catholicism and Protestantism.

Parts of Westphalia came under Brandenburg-Prussian control during the 17th and 18th centuries, but most of it remained divided by duchies and other areas of feudal power. The Peace of Westphalia of 1648, signed in Münster and Osnabrück, ended the Thirty Years' War. The concept of nation-state sovereignty resulting from the treaty became known as "Westphalian sovereignty".

=== Prussia ===
Prussian Westphalia edged in red, the Kingdom of Westphalia edged in green with the territorial overlap of former Minden-Ravensberg, pasted over today's borders with North Rhine-Westphalia in dark grey

Westphalia (red), within the Kingdom of Prussia, within the German Empire

After the defeat of the Prussian Army by the French at the Battle of Jena–Auerstedt, the Treaty of Tilsit in 1807 made the easternmost portion of today's Westphalia part of the French client Kingdom of Westphalia until 1813, when the kingdom was dissolved by the Russians. While this state shared its name with the historical region, it only contained a relatively small part of Westphalia, rather consisting of mostly Hessian and Eastphalian regions.

Following to the Congress of Vienna, Prussia received a large amount of territories in the Westphalian region and created the Province of Westphalia in 1815. After in 1816, the former Duchy of Westphalia and the counties of Wittgenstein and in 1851 the condominium of Lippstadt had joined the province, Westphalia had received its modern territorial shape.

In 1816, the governmental districts of Arnsberg, Minden and Münster were created.

=== Modern Westphalia ===
After World War II in 1946, the present state of North Rhine-Westphalia was created by the British military government from the former Prussian Province of Westphalia and the northern half of the former Prussian Rhine Province. The old governmental districts of 1816 stayed in place. When in 1947 the former Free State of Lippe with its capital Detmold joined North Rhine-Westphalia, the "Governmental District of Minden" was enlarged by this territory and renamed "Governmental District of Detmold". In total, North Rhine-Westphalia is subdivided into five governmental districts (Regierungsbezirke). Westphalia today consists of the old governmental districts of Arnsberg and Münster and of Detmold (including the District of Lippe, which is a separate historical region). Inhabitants of the region call themselves Westphalians and their home region Westphalia even though there is no administrative division by that name.

== Economy ==
Westphalia is home to the headquarters of Westfalia-Werke, the contractor that built the Volkswagen Westfalia Campers.

== In popular culture ==
In Candide, the protagonist of Voltaire's novella of the same name, resides in Westphalia in the beginning of the story.

== See also ==
- Westphalian ham
- Horst Castle
