= North Rhine =

Short-lived administrative region in the British occupation zone of Germany

Provinz Nordrhein
- Part of British-administered Germany
- 1945–1946
- Coat of arms

- Location of North Rhine province within the British Zone (1945-46).
- Capital: Düsseldorf
- Historical era: Post-World War II
  - Established: 1945
  - Creation of North Rhine-Westphalia: 23 August 1946
Preceded by	Succeeded by
Rhine Province	North Rhine-Westphalia; Rhineland Area Association

The Province of North Rhine (German: Provinz Nordrhein), also called North Rhine Province (Nordrhein-Provinz or Nord-Rheinprovinz), was a short-lived administrative region in the British occupation zone of Germany. It was formed from the northern part of the Rhine Province after the end of the Second World War.

It was formed on 5 June 1945 on the basis of the Berlin Declaration and the resulting creation of occupation zones for the victors of World War II out of the administrative regions (Regierungsbezirke) of Aachen, Düsseldorf and Cologne, which were all part of Prussia's Rhine Province. The southern part of Rhine Province, consisting of the administrative regions of Koblenz and Trier became part of the French occupation zone on 5 June 1945. The Rhineland, which had been united in 1815 by the Congress of Vienna under the Prussian crown, was thus split between different governments and administrations in 1946 into the states of North Rhine-Westphalia and Rhineland-Palatinate. Rhine Province existed until 20 October 1946. On that day the government formed in August 1946 for the state of North Rhine-Westphalia dissolved the upper councils of the provinces of North Rhine and Westphalia on the instructions of the British occupying power.

The headquarters of the upper council or Oberpräsidium of North Rhine was initially in Bonn, but in October 1945 it moved to Düsseldorf (Landeshaus Düsseldorf). Its Oberpräsidents were Johannes Fuchs (centre, to October 1945) and the later federal minister Robert Lehr (CDU, from October 1945 to August 1946). They were under the occupying authority of John Ashworth Barraclough, the British military governor of the Province of North Rhine.

Parts of the province's responsibilities and authorities (e.g. the Landeskliniken) were later transferred to the Rhineland Regional Association.

== See also ==
- Creation of the state of North Rhine-Westphalia
