= Hellweg Börde =

Natural landscape in Germany

The Hellweg Börde (German: Hellwegbörde) is a börde landscape and natural region on the southern edge of the Westphalian Lowland in the German state of North Rhine-Westphalia, which embraces the old Hellweg trading route cities and towns of Dortmund, Unna, Werl and Soest extending to Salzkotten and from there in an ever narrower strip to its northeastern tip at Schlangen on the edge of the town of Bad Lippspringe. It is characterised by its heavy deposits of post ice age loess soils. The region can be further divided into the Werl-Unna Börde, Soest Börde and Geseke Börde.

In the west the loess soils of the Hellweg Börde continue into the Westenhellweg region.

== History ==
By the Stone Age (around 4,000 B.C.) grain was already being cultivated here on the fertile, calcareous land. The oldest trace of a Neolithic culture was the discovery of pottery from the La Hoguette Culture dating to the middle of the 6th millennium B.C.

== See also ==
- Geography of Germany
- Natural regions of Germany
