= Hellweg =

Term for medieval travelling routes in Germany

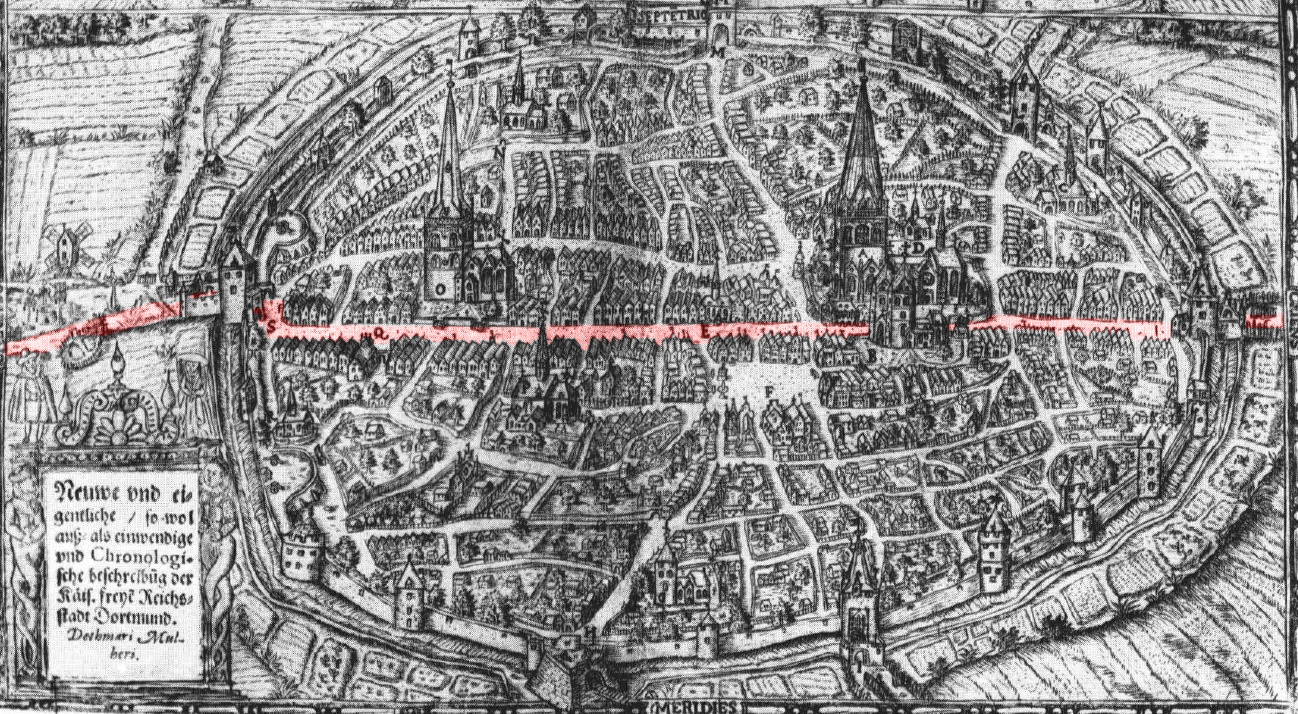
The Westphalian Hellweg (marked red) at Dortmund in 1610, map by Detmar Muhler

In the Middle Ages, Hellweg was the official and common name given to main travelling routes in Germany. Their breadth was decreed as an unimpeded passageway a lance's width, about three metres, which the landholders, through which the Hellweg passed, were required to maintain.

In German scholarship and literature, however, Helweg, i.e. when employed without an adjective, usually refers to the well-researched Westphalian Hellweg, the main road from the region of the lower Rhine east to the mountains of the Teutoburg Forest, linking the imperial cities of Duisburg, at the confluence of the Rhine and Ruhr rivers, and Paderborn, with the slopes of the Sauerland to its south. At Paderborn, it very probably continued into at least two other main imperial roads leading further east and north to the Harz mountains and the middle Elbe river, and the lower Weser and lower Elbe rivers, respectively.

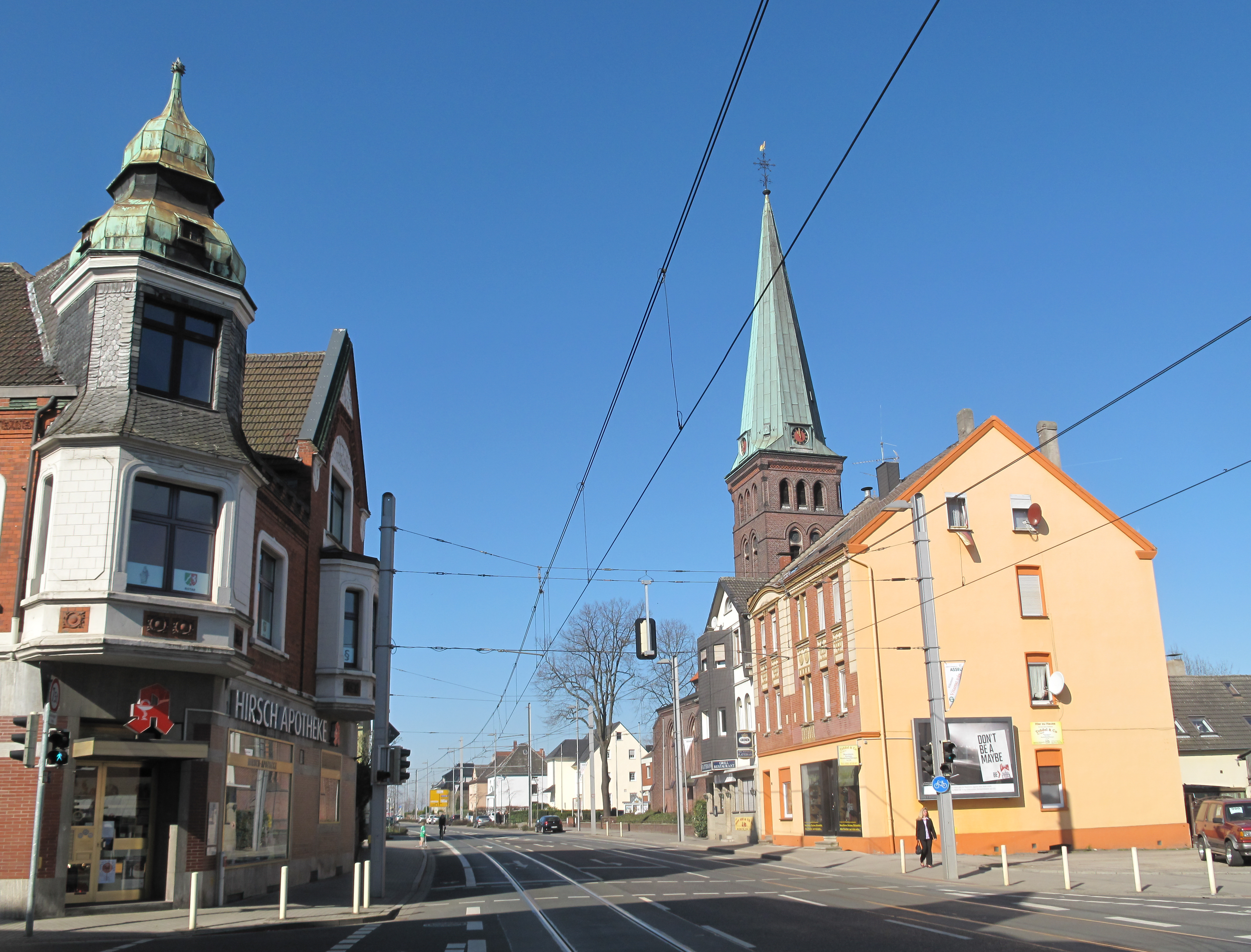
Dortmund-Asseln, street: Asselner Hellweg

The Westphalian Hellweg, as an essential corridor that operated in overland transit of long-distance trade, was used by Charlemagne in his Saxon wars and later was maintained under Imperial supervision. In the 10th and 11th centuries this Hellweg was the preferred route of the Ottonian and Salian kings and emperors travelling at least yearly between their main estates in Saxony and the imperial city of Aachen, when they were not in Italy or on campaign; very important imperial palaces were located in both Duisburg and Paderborn.

From the Early Modern period, with the rise of the coal and steel industries, medieval towns founded along the trading route, e.g. Gelsenkirchen, Bochum, Essen or Dortmund, evolved into industrial hubs and absorbed most of the population growth of the region.

The name Hellweg, connoting the wide "bright" clearway (heller Weg) through the forest, derives from Low German helwech with this same significance. Another etymology for Hellweg is from Salzweg, the "Salt road", on the ancient roots hál-s (Greek), and hal (Celtic), "salt". Yet another meaning connotes a "Way of the Dead"; e.g., in Grimm's Worterbuch, Helvegr is the route to Hel, the Underworld.
