= Lengerich (Westfalen) station =

Railway station in Lengerich, Germany

Lengerich (Westf)
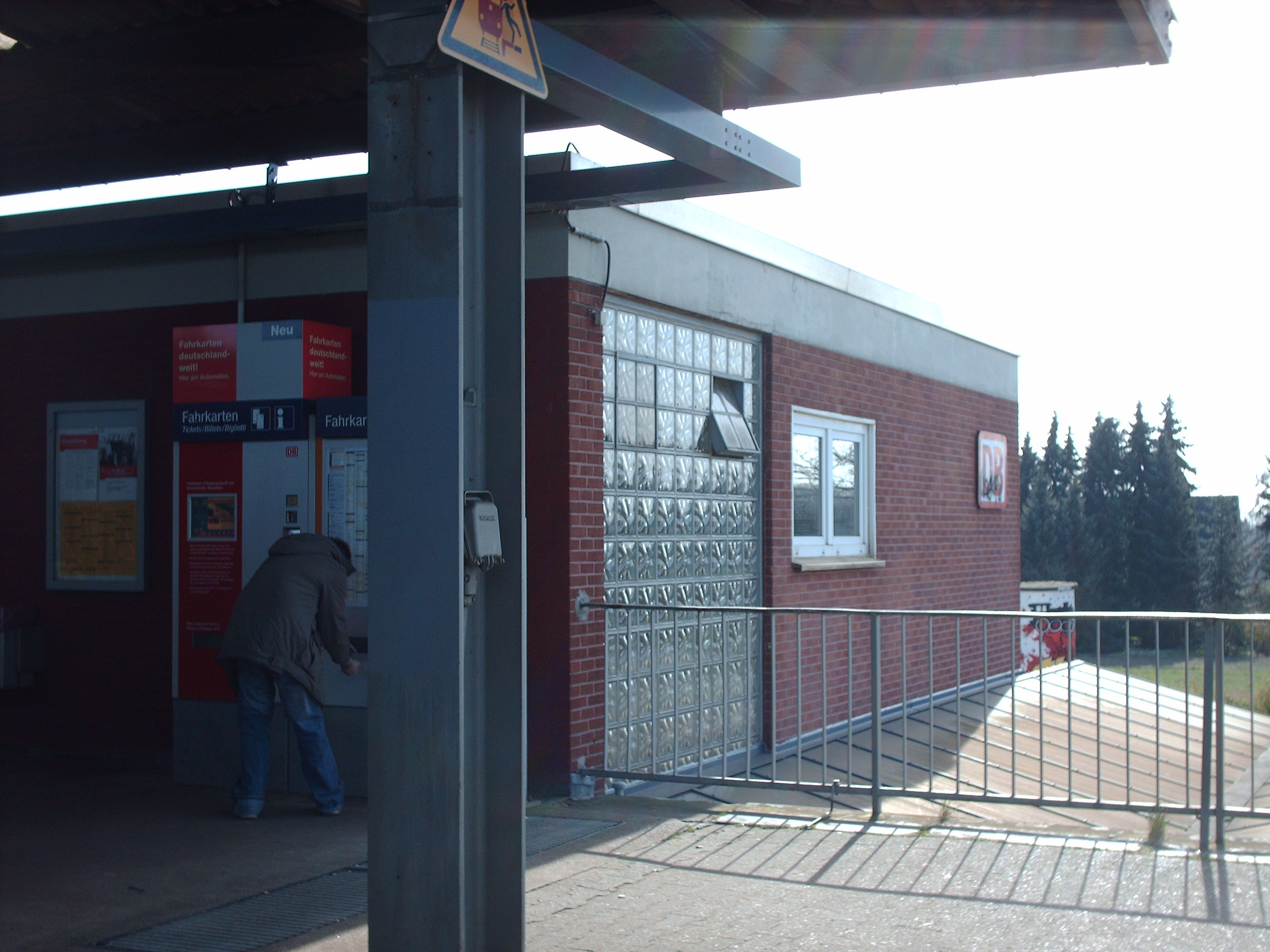
- The station building in 2008

General information
- Location: Bahnhofstraße 193; Lengerich, North Rhine-Westphalia; Germany
- Coordinates: 52°10′33″N 7°52′41″E
- Elevation: 79 m (259 ft)
- Owner: Deutsche Bahn
- Operator: DB Netz; DB Station&Service
- Lines: Wanne-Eickel–Hamburg (KBS 385)
- Distance: 98.8 km (61.4 mi) from Wanne-Eickel
- Platforms: 1 island platform 1 side platform
- Tracks: 10
- Train operators: DB Regio NRW; eurobahn
- Connections: 143, 146, 147, R45, R46, X493

Construction
- Parking: Yes
- Cycle facilities: Yes
- Accessible: Yes

Other information
- Station code: 3662
- DS100 code: ELEN
- IBNR: 8003640
- Category: 5
- Fare zone: Westfalentarif: 51941; VOS: 422 (buses only)
- Website: www.bahnhof.de

Services
| Preceding station | DB Regio NRW | Following station |
|---|---|---|
| Ostbevern towards Düsseldorf Hbf | RE 2 | Hasbergen towards Osnabrück Hbf |
| Kattenvenne towards Düsseldorf Hbf | RE 2 | Natrup-Hagen towards Osnabrück Hbf |
| Preceding station | | Following station |
| Kattenvenne towards Münster Hbf | RB 66 | Natrup-Hagen towards Osnabrück Hbf |
Location

Lengerich (Westfalen) railway station (German: Bahnhof Lengerich (Westfalen)), sometimes shortened to Lengerich (Westf), is a railway station located in Lengerich, Germany. The station is located on the Wanne-Eickel–Hamburg railway line.The train services are operated by DB Regio NRW and eurobahn.

== Services ==
As of the December 2025 timetable change, the following services stop at Lengerich (Westfalen):

- Rhein-Haard-Express (RE 2): hourly service between Düsseldorf Hbf and Osnabrück Hbf
- Regionalbahn: hourly service between Münster Hbf and Osnabrück Hbf
