= Kattenvenne station =

Railway station in Lienen, Germany

Kattenvenne
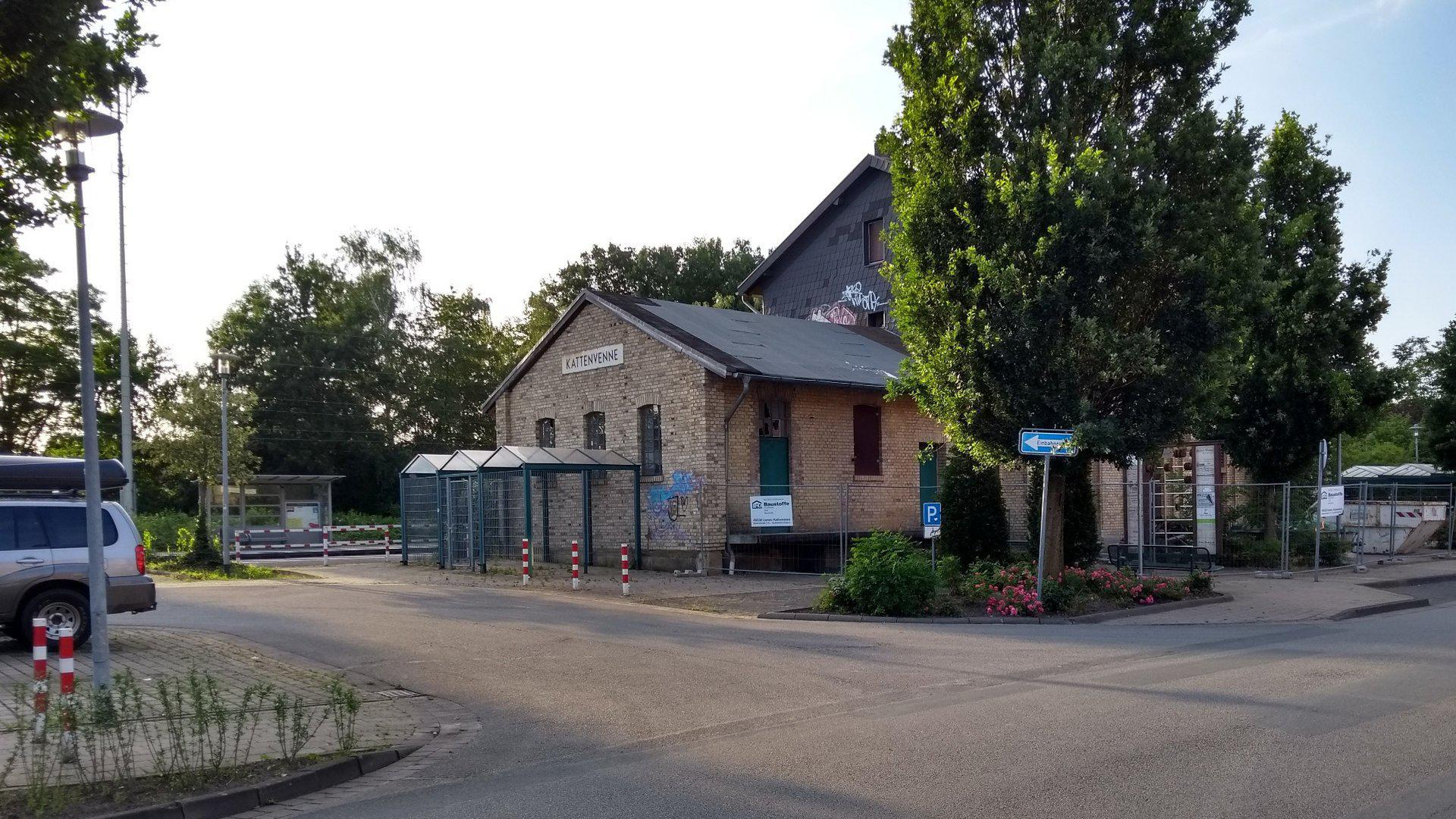
- The station in 2020

General information
- Location: Kattenvenne, North Rhine-Westphalia; Germany
- Coordinates: 52°06′45″N 7°51′35″E
- Owner: Deutsche Bahn
- Lines: Wanne-Eickel–Hamburg (KBS 385)
- Distance: 91.1 km (56.6 mi) from Wanne-Eickel
- Platforms: 1 island platform; 1 side platform
- Tracks: 3
- Train operators: DB Regio NRW; Eurobahn

Other information
- Station code: 3135
- DS100 code: EKV
- IBNR: 8003212
- Category: 6

Services
Preceding station		Following station
Ostbevern towards Münster Hbf	RB 66	Lengerich (Westfalen) towards Osnabrück Hbf
Preceding station	DB Regio NRW	Following station
Ostbevern towards Düsseldorf Hbf	RE 2	Lengerich (Westfalen) towards Osnabrück Hbf
Location

Kattenvenne station is a train station located in Kattenvenne, Lienen, in North Rhine-Westphalia, Germany. The station is located on the Wanne-Eickel–Hamburg railway line. The train services are operated by DB Regio NRW and Eurobahn.

== Services ==
As of the December 2025 timetable change, the following services stop at Kattenvenne:

- Rhein-Haard-Express (RE 2): individual services between Düsseldorf Hbf and Osnabrück Hbf
- Regionalbahn: hourly service between Münster Hbf and Osnabrück Hbf
