= Natrup-Hagen station =

Railway station in Hagen am Teutoburger Wald, Germany

Natrup-Hagen
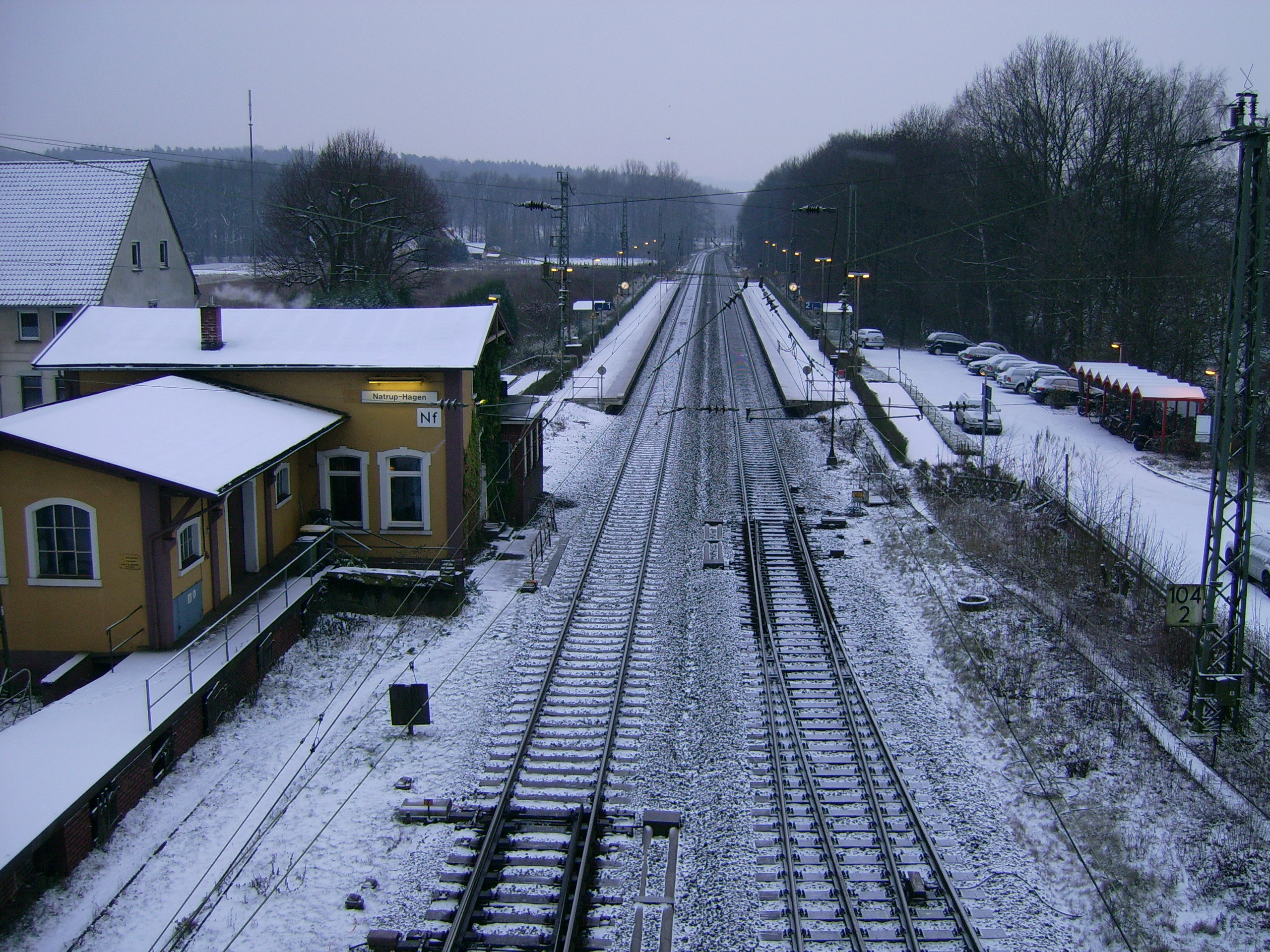
- The station in 2009

General information
- Location: Hagen am Teutoburger Wald, Lower Saxony; Germany
- Coordinates: 52°12′33″N 7°54′39″E
- Owner: Deutsche Bahn
- Lines: Wanne-Eickel–Hamburg (KBS 385)
- Distance: 104.2 km (64.7 mi) from Wanne-Eickel
- Platforms: 2 side platforms
- Tracks: 2
- Train operators: DB Regio NRW; Eurobahn

Other information
- Station code: 4305
- DS100 code: HNAH
- IBNR: 8004208
- Category: 6

Services
Preceding station		Following station
Lengerich (Westfalen) towards Münster Hbf	RB 66	Hasbergen towards Osnabrück Hbf
Preceding station	DB Regio NRW	Following station
Lengerich (Westfalen) towards Düsseldorf Hbf	RE 2	Hasbergen towards Osnabrück Hbf
Location

Natrup-Hagen station (German: Bahnhof Natrup-Hagen) is a railway station located in Hagen am Teutoburger Wald, Germany. The station is located on the Wanne-Eickel–Hamburg railway line. The train services are operated by DB Regio NRW and Eurobahn.

== Services ==
As of the December 2025 timetable change, the following services stop at Natrup-Hagen:

- Rhein-Haard-Express (RE 2): individual services between Düsseldorf Hbf and Osnabrück Hbf
- Regionalbahn: hourly service between Münster Hbf and Osnabrück Hbf
