= Westbevern station =

Railway station in Telgte, Germany

Westbevern
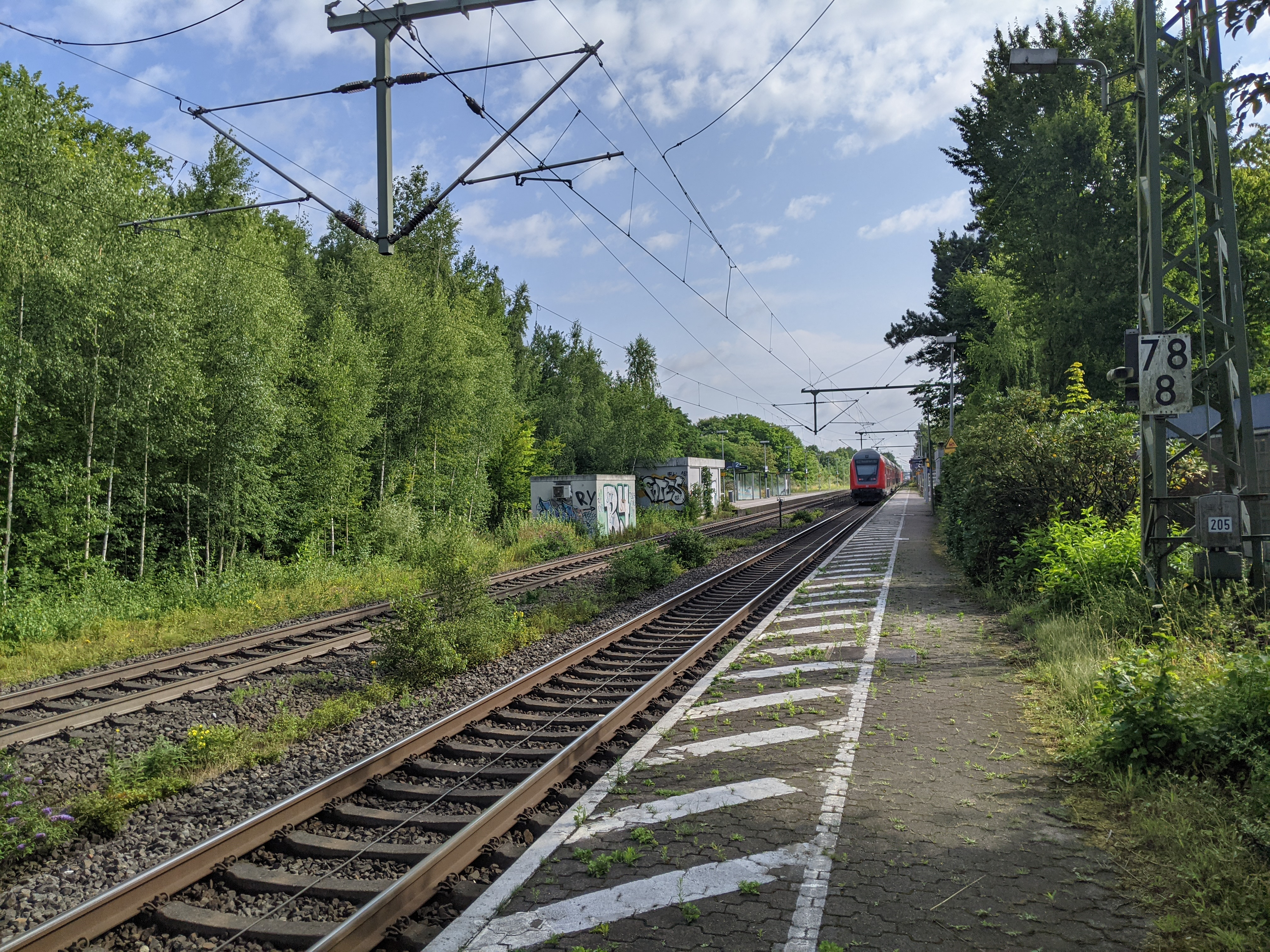
- The station platforms in 2025

General information
- Location: Telgte; Germany
- Coordinates: 52°02′N 7°44′E
- Owner: Deutsche Bahn
- Lines: Wanne-Eickel–Hamburg (KBS 385)
- Distance: 78.9 km (49.0 mi) from Wanne-Eickel
- Platforms: 2 side platforms
- Tracks: 2
- Train operators: DB Regio NRW; Eurobahn
- Connections: Bus lines

Other information
- Station code: 890
- DS100 code: EBRO
- IBNR: 8021019
- Category: 6

Services
Preceding station	DB Regio NRW	Following station
Münster Hbf towards Düsseldorf Hbf	RE 2	Ostbevern towards Osnabrück Hbf
Preceding station		Following station
Münster Hbf Terminus	RB 66	Ostbevern towards Osnabrück Hbf
Location

Westbevern station (German: Bahnhof Westbevern) is a railway station in the municipality of Telgte in North Rhine-Westphalia, Germany. It is located on the Wanne-Eickel–Hamburg railway of Deutsche Bahn. The station is located in the district of Vadrup and lies approximately 2.5 kilometres (1.6 mi) west of the namesake district of Westbevern.

== Services ==
As of the April 2025 timetable change, the following services stop at Westbevern:

- RE 2 / RB 66: half-hourly service to Osnabrück and Münster; hourly service to Düsseldorf.
