= Ostbevern station =

Railway station in Ostbevern, Germany

Ostbevern
- The station platform in 2026

General information
- Location: Ostbevern; Germany
- Coordinates: 52°04′11″N 7°48′33″E
- Owner: Deutsche Bahn
- Lines: Wanne-Eickel–Hamburg (KBS 385)
- Distance: 85.1 km (52.9 mi) from Wanne-Eickel
- Platforms: 2 side platforms
- Tracks: 2
- Train operators: DB Regio NRW; Eurobahn
- Connections: Westfalenbus bus lines

Other information
- Station code: 890
- DS100 code: EBRO
- IBNR: 8021019
- Category: 6

Services
Preceding station	DB Regio NRW	Following station
Westbevern towards Düsseldorf Hbf	RE 2	Kattenvenne towards Osnabrück Hbf
Preceding station		Following station
Westbevern towards Münster Hbf	RB 66	Kattenvenne towards Osnabrück Hbf
Location

Ostbevern station (German: Bahnhof Ostbevern) is a railway station in the municipality of Ostbevern in North Rhine-Westphalia, Germany. It is located on the Wanne-Eickel–Hamburg railway of Deutsche Bahn. The station lies approximately 4 kilometres (2.5 mi) northwest of the village of Ostbevern.

== Services ==
As of the April 2025 timetable change, the following services stop at Ostbevern:

- RE 2 / RB 66: half-hourly service to Osnabrück and Münster; hourly service to Düsseldorf.
