= Hasbergen station =

Railway station in Hasbergen, Germany

Hasbergen
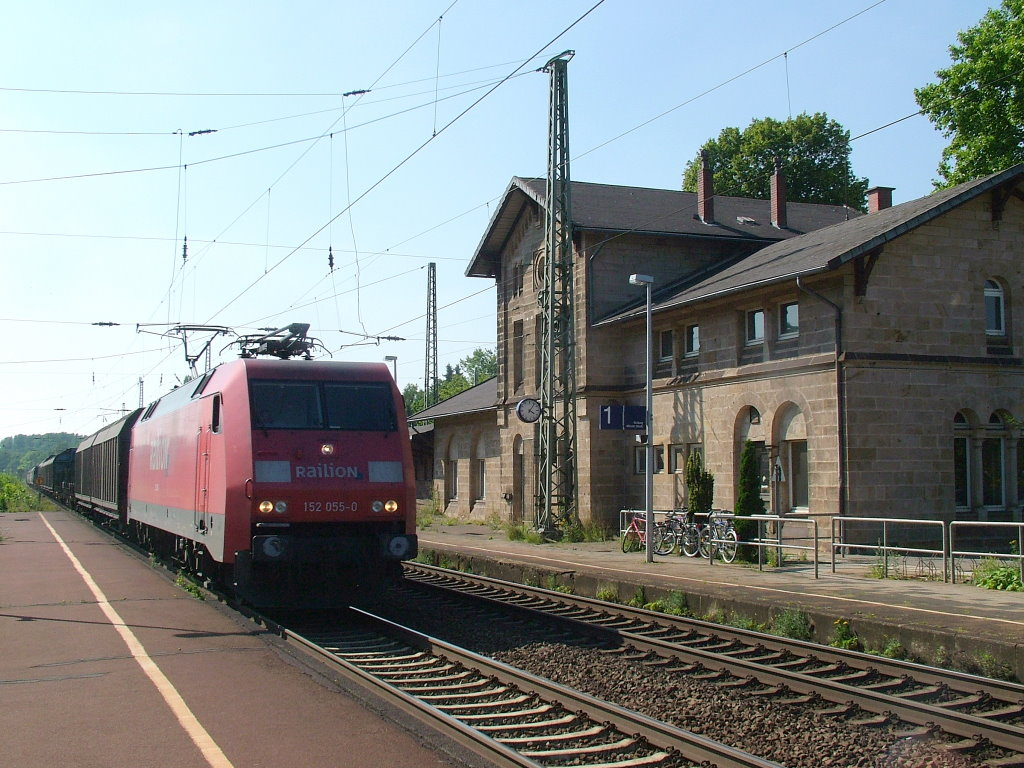
- Freight train passes the station in 2005

General information
- Location: Hasbergen, Lower Saxony; Germany
- Coordinates: 52°14′30″N 7°57′12″E
- Owner: Deutsche Bahn
- Lines: Wanne-Eickel–Hamburg (KBS 385); Georgsmarienhütte–Hasbergen
- Distance: 109.1 km (67.8 mi) from Wanne-Eickel; 7.8 km (4.8 mi) from Georgsmarienhütte
- Platforms: 2 side platforms
- Tracks: 2
- Train operators: DB Regio NRW; Eurobahn

Other information
- Station code: 2576
- DS100 code: HHSB
- IBNR: 8002615
- Category: 6

Services
Preceding station		Following station
Natrup-Hagen towards Münster Hbf	RB 66	Osnabrück Hbf Terminus
Preceding station	DB Regio NRW	Following station
Natrup-Hagen towards Düsseldorf Hbf	RE 2	Osnabrück Hbf Terminus
Location

Hasbergen station (German: Bahnhof Hasbergen) is a railway station located in Hasbergen, Germany. The station is located on the Wanne-Eickel–Hamburg railway line. The Georgsmarienhütte–Hasbergen railway line branches off east of the station. The train services are operated by DB Regio NRW and Eurobahn.

== Services ==
As of the December 2025 timetable change, the following services stop at Hasbergen:

- Rhein-Haard-Express (RE 2): individual services between Düsseldorf Hbf and Osnabrück Hbf
- Regionalbahn: hourly service between Münster Hbf and Osnabrück Hbf
