= Recklinghausen Süd station =

Railway station in Recklinghausen, Germany

Recklinghausen Süd
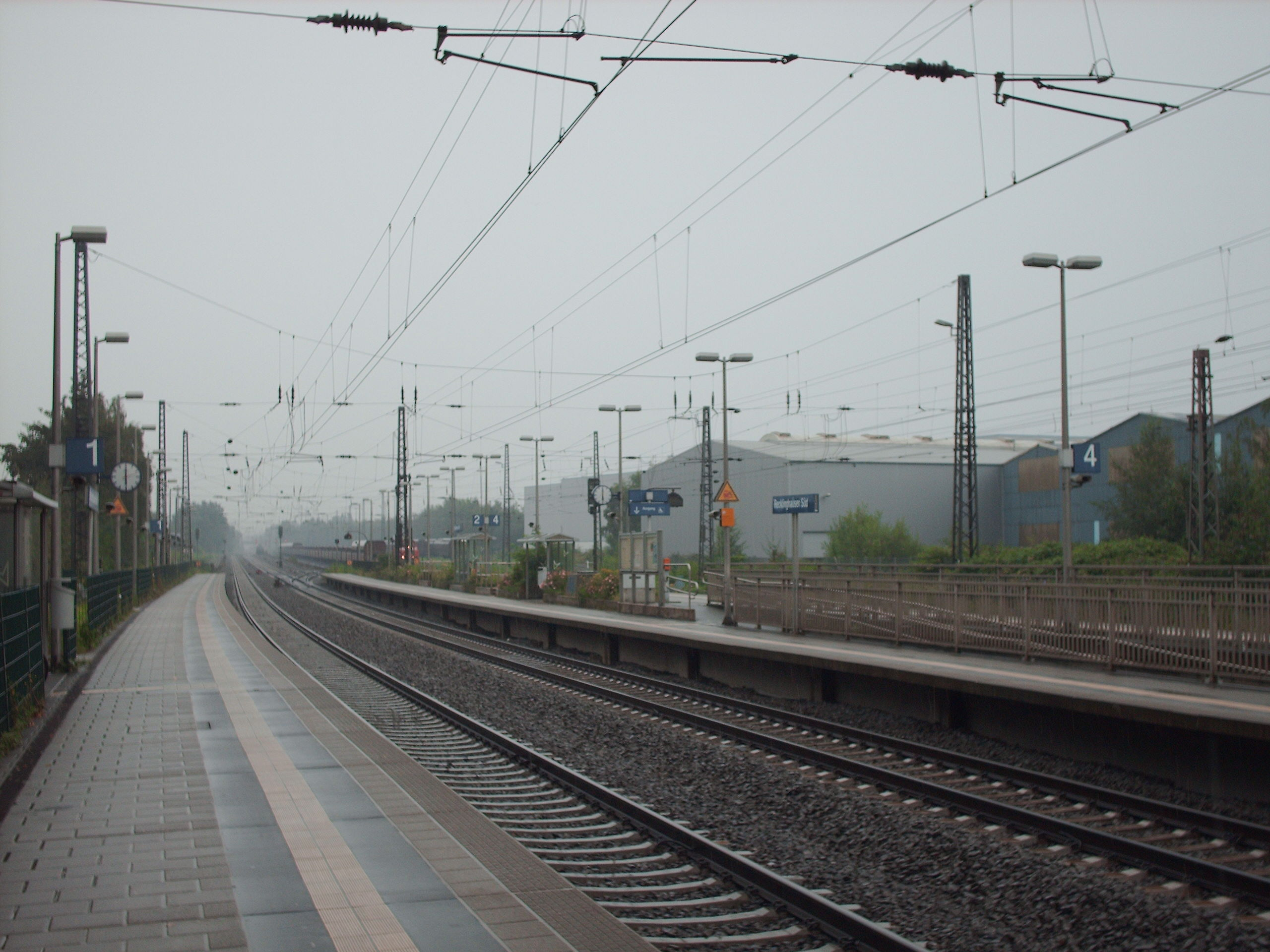

General information
- Location: Am Südbahnhof 4-6, Recklinghausen, NRW; Germany
- Coordinates: 51°33′44″N 7°11′45″E
- Lines: Wanne-Eickel–Hamburg (KBS 425, KBS 450.2)
- Platforms: 2

Construction
- Accessible: Yes

Other information
- Station code: 5161
- DS100 code: ERES
- IBNR: 8000887
- Category: 5
- Fare zone: VRR: 174
- Website: www.bahnhof.de

History
- Opened: 1880/86

Services
Preceding station	DB Regio NRW	Following station
Bochum-Hamme towards Bochum Hbf	RE 41	Recklinghausen Hbf towards Haltern am See
Wanne-Eickel Hbf towards Mönchengladbach Hbf	RE 42	Recklinghausen Hbf towards Münster Hbf
Preceding station	Rhine-Ruhr S-Bahn	Following station
Recklinghausen Hbf Terminus	S2	Herne towards Dortmund Hbf
Location

Recklinghausen Süd station is located in the city of Recklinghausen in the German state of North Rhine-Westphalia. It is on the Wanne-Eickel–Hamburg line. The line and station opened between 1880 and 1886, originally as Bruch station. it was renamed Recklinghausen Süd between 1897 and 1905. It is classified by Deutsche Bahn as a category 5 station.

== History ==
The construction of the Hamburg-Venlo railway in 1870 by the Cologne-Minden Railway Company made the southern part of Recklinghausen (Südstadt) and Hochlarmark accessible by rail. Even the workers of the Recklinghausen colliery were able to reach their jobs faster. It was decided to build a station building with a home platform and a platform on the other side of the tracks. A pedestrian bridge was built on the north side of the station, which could be used when the level crossing was closed.

In the 1970s the station was modernised. The tracks to the now disused colliery were removed, the station building and pedestrian bridge were demolished and the platforms were rebuilt. The home platform became a side platform and a second side was added to the other side platform to create a central platform between two tracks. This additional track was built to allow direct trips to Herne station. But it was only briefly in operation and was later used for freight. In addition, a modern signal box was built east of the platforms. As part of the extension of line S 2 of the Rhine-Ruhr S-Bahn to Recklinghausen Hauptbahnhof, the station was modernised for a second time in 1997-1998. The two platforms were equipped with ramps and the platform on track 3 was raised to S-Bahn height (96 cm). This means that the central platform has two different heights, because the platforms on tracks 1 and 2 are on the old level (76 cm). With the completion of the modernisation of Recklinghausen Süd station, it was downgraded to the category of "regional halt" (German: Nahverkehrssystemhalt) because it is now only served by S-Bahn and Regionalbahn trains. On 24 May 1998, it was served for the first time by the S-Bahn, which since then has operated from 6 am to 8 pm, Monday to Friday, between Recklinghausen and Dortmund.

== Station facilities ==
Recklinghausen Süd station is a through station, with a middle and a side platform (which was formerly next to a station building) connected by a pedestrian tunnel. It has three platform tracks. It is served by two Regional-Express services, the Vest-Ruhr-Express RE 41, connecting Bochum and Haltern am See, and the Rhein-Haard-Express RE 42, connecting Essen and Münster. Track 4 is served S-Bahn line S 2, running between Dortmund and Recklinghausen. Each operate every 60 minutes during the day.

It is also served by two bus routes: 210 (at 30 minute intervals) and 239 (15), both operated by Vestische Straßenbahnen GmbH.

The platforms had a signal box, which was still operated by two people until 2010, but is now remotely controlled from Dülmen. North of the platforms are the tracks of the freight depot. This is significantly reduced compared to the original facility and its former hump has been removed.
