= Rollbahn =

A rollbahn is a German word designating a taxiway. This may be:

- A one lane road, for example, in the Second World War it described key routes designated by the German Wehrmacht, for example, the route Moscow-Minsk-Brest (now highway No. 1).
- The nickname for the Wanne-Eickel–Hamburg railway, part of the historic Hamburg-Venlo railway.
- The taxiway between runways or the runway of an airport and its terminal or other places.
