= Essen–Gelsenkirchen railway =

Railway line in Germany

Overview
- Line number: 2163 (Essen–Essen Kray Nord); 2168 (Essen-Kray Nord–Gelsenkirchen); 2230 (GE-Hessler–Wanne-Eickel); 2234 (GE-Rotthausen–GE Schalke Süd); 2237 (GE-Rotthausen–Gelsenkirchen)
- Locale: North Rhine-Westphalia, Germany

Service
- Route number: 425, 450.2

Technical
- Line length: 10.1 km (6.3 mi)
- Number of tracks: 2:Essen–Gelsenkirchen
- Track gauge: 1,435 mm (4 ft 8 1/2 in) standard gauge
- Electrification: 15 kV/16.7 Hz AC overhead catenary
- Operating speed: 110 km/h (68.4 mph) (max)

The Gelsenkirchen Essen railway is a double-track, electrified main line railway in the central Ruhr area of the German state of North Rhine-Westphalia. It runs from Essen Hauptbahnhof via Essen-Kray Nord to Gelsenkirchen Hauptbahnhof.

== History ==
Between 1866 and 1874 the Rhenish Railway Company (German: Rheinische Eisenbahn-Gesellschaft, RhE) built its own Ruhr line from Osterath on the Lower Left Rhine Railway to Dortmund RhE station, in competition with the Witten/Dortmund–Oberhausen/Duisburg railway built by the Bergisch-Märkische Railway Company (Bergisch-Märkische Eisenbahn-Gesellschaft, BME) between 1860 and 1862 and the Duisburg–Dortmund railway completed by the Cologne-Minden Railway Company (Cöln-Mindener Eisenbahn-Gesellschaft, CME) in 1848 and which ran a little further north.

The Rhenish line was opened to Wattenscheid RhE (later called Gelsenkirchen-Wattenscheid) station in 1868 and completed to Dortmund RhE six years later. During construction of the line a branch was built in 1870 to the joint CME and BME Duisburg station (now Duisburg Hauptbahnhof) in order to be competitive.

=== Kray–Gelsenkirchen ===
For the same reason, the RhE built a branch from its Ruhr line at Kray station (now Essen-Kray Nord station) to the north, which was opened on 13 February 1872 for freight and on 1 June 1872 for passengers. The line ended at Gelsenkirchen RhE station, south of the CME Duisburg–Dortmund line, less than half a kilometre from Gelsenkirchen CME station (now Gelsenkirchen Hauptbahnhof).

In 1876, a passenger station was opened midway on the line near Dahlbusch colliery as Dahlbusch station; in 1895 a freight yard was opened there. The station has been renamed several times, first in 1898 as Dahlbusch Rotthausen, in 1907 as Rotthausen (Kreis Essen) and finally in 1924 as Gelsenkirchen-Rotthausen station.

After the nationalisation of all of the nominally private railway companies in Prussia in the late 19th century, the Prussian state railways began, on the one hand, to eliminate or merge unnecessary or redundant rail facilities and, on the other, to build new lines connecting the individual sections of the former railway companies.

For this reason, the Rhenish station in Gelsenkirchen was closed in 1904 and all traffic was moved to the Cologne-Minden station, which was then rebuilt on a large scale and renamed in 1907 as Gelsenkirchen Hauptbahnhof. To be able to serve this station without a level crossing, an additional connection was built to Rotthausen (VzG line number 2237), which passes under the Cologne-Minden trunk line on the tracks of an old freight line (now occupied by the street of Rotthauser Strasse). The entire line was then duplicated to Kray Nord, which was completed in 1908.

=== Rotthausen–Schalke/Gelsenkirchen–Hessler ===
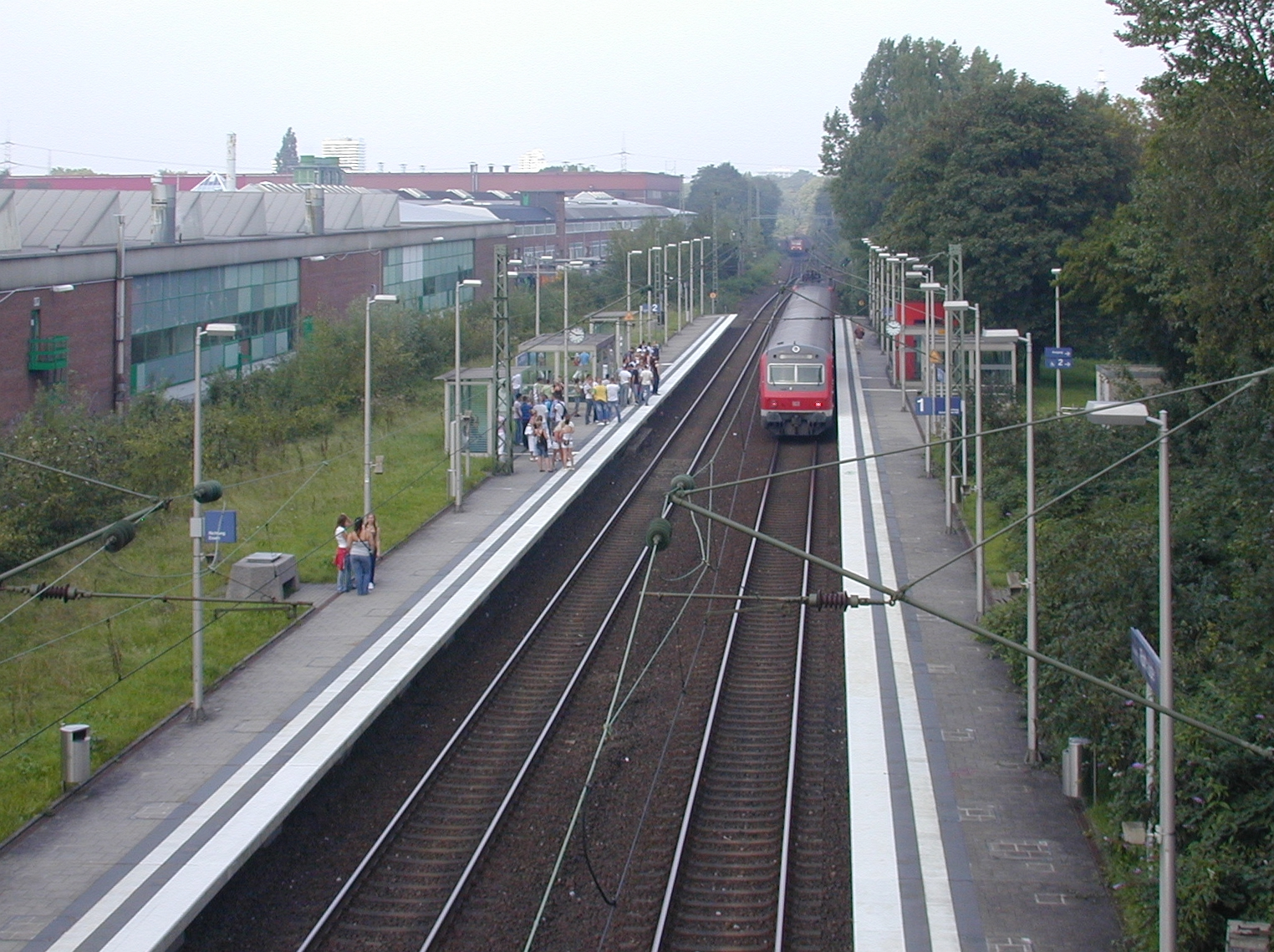
Platforms of Gelsenkirchen-Rotthausen station

Only half a year after completion of the line from Kray to Gelsenkirchen, on 18 September 1872, the RhE opened a siding to the Wilhelmine Victoria colliery in the district of Hessler, together with Schalke RhE station. Since this crossed the important Cologne-Minden main line on the level west of Gelsenkirchen, the station and siding were closed at the end of the 1880s following the nationalisation of the railways, after less than twenty years of operation. In 1893, the station reopened as Schalke Süd (from 1907 it was called Gelsenkirchen-Schalke Süd).

The siding from Gelsenkirchen was upgraded to a regular freight line and a connection was opened to Hessler station on the BME Emscher Valley Railway on 1 April 1897. The track was duplicated between Hessler and Schalke Süd in 1898 and two years later the track to Gelsenkirchen was also duplicated. The line was also used for passenger transport from 1 May 1902.

On 12 September 1903, freight traffic was resumed on the original line between Rotthausen and Schalke Süd stations. Freight traffic on the line was abandoned on 28 May 1967 and the section was closed completely on 1 June 1969.

By 1933, passenger traffic between Gelsenkirchen Hauptbahnhof and Gelsenkirchen-Hessler station had been closed. After the Second World War it had a short revival from 4 May 1947 to 8 May 1948. In the 1970s, the second track was dismantled and on 30 September 1979 the line was designated as a branch line.

=== Kray–Wanne ===
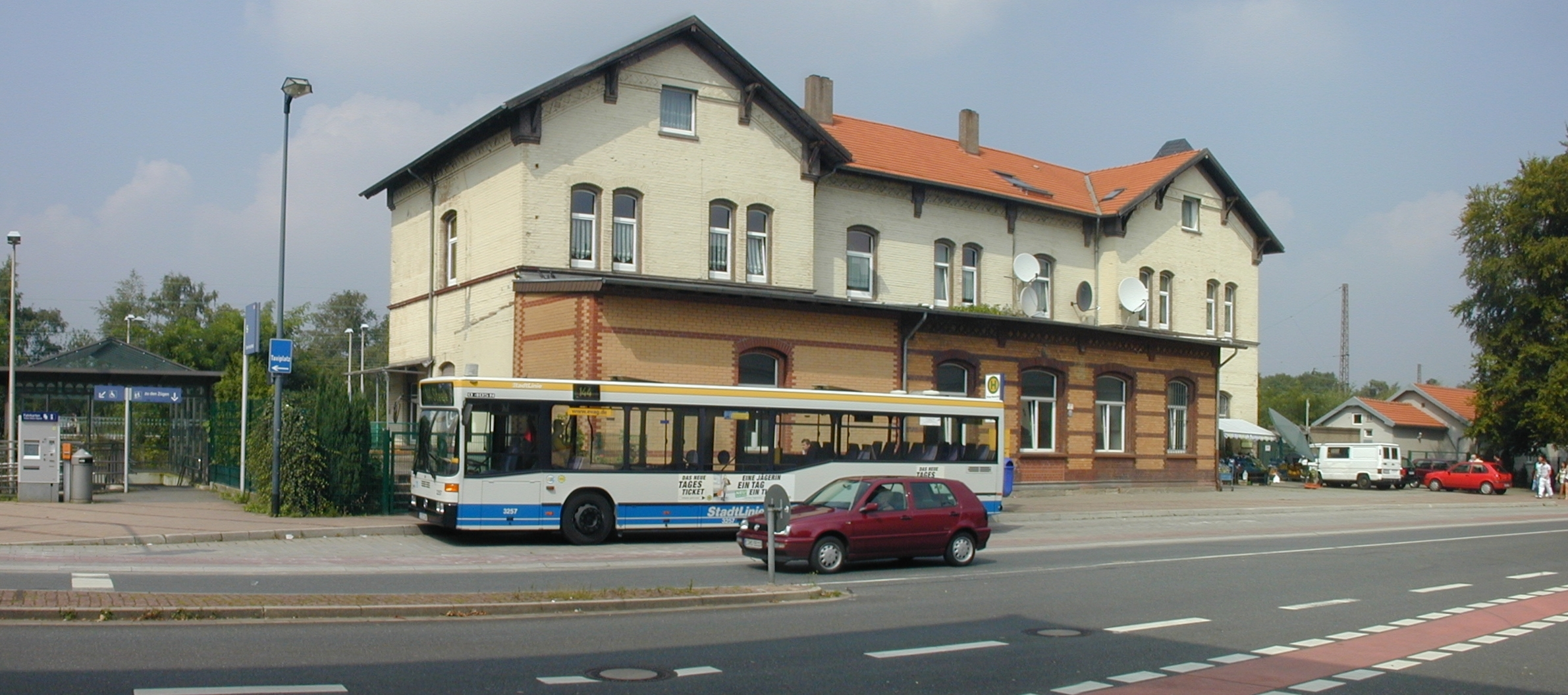
Essen-Kray Nord station building

On 25 March 1875, the RhE opened another branch line from Kray, this was a 9 km long line that ran almost directly to Wanne CME station (now Wanne-Eickel Hauptbahnhof). This was only ever used for freight and was closed on 1 August 1890. Following its closure, the line continued to be used under the VzG line number of 2209 as a colliery siding. Part of it later became part of the Gelsenkirchen–Wanne-Eickel freight line (line number 2231).

=== Essen–Kray Nord ===
On 1 May 1905, the Royal Railway Division of Essen (königliche Eisenbahndirection Essen) opened a southern extension of the reconstructed line from Gelsenkirchen to connect with the line from Essen Hauptbahnhof to Gelsenkirchen-Bismarck (via Stoppenberg and Katernberg-Nord), an originally single-track line, at Frillendorf junction.

Platforms were built on the new line parallel to Kray station on the former RhE line. The station was renamed Kray Nord station in 1896 after the opening of the Kray Süd station on the Essen–Wattenscheid–Bochum line. Since 16 July 1914, the line has been fully duplicated from Essen Hauptbahnhof to Kray Nord.

== Development of the line ==
More than 30 years passed between the construction of the two sections of the line, which were both originally intended only as supplements to the Rhenish line. Nevertheless, they became increasingly important, while the Rhenish line increasingly lost its importance because of its poor location between the Cologne-Minden and the Bergisch-Märkische lines.

The two sections were combined to make a main line between two major stations. After the Second World War, the line was upgraded and the whole line was electrified on 27 May 1962.

Between 1972 and 1974, the line was realigned from the eastern end of Essen Hauptbahnhof as part of the redevelopment for the Rhine-Ruhr S-Bahn, its connection to the line via Stoppenberg to Gelsenkirchen-Bismarck, which had been abandoned in 1970, was removed and connections were built to Essen-Kray via a flying junction to the two S-Bahn tracks on the south side of the station, as well as to the terminating tracks on the north side of the station.

== Current operations ==
The Rhenish Ruhr line is now closed along with most of its branch lines or reduced to stations and sidings. The connecting line from Gelsenkirchen to Gelsenkirchen-Hessler only serves to connect with the Essen Katernberg Nord siding of the former Bergisch-Märkische Railway’s Emscher Valley Railway, which otherwise would have no connection to the railway network anymore.

The line between Essen and Gelsenkirchen, however, is served by a variety of passenger services, although the intermediate stations of Essen-Kray Nord and Gelsenkirchen-Rotthausen are only served once an hour by S-Bahn line S2.

=== Rail services ===
In long-distance rail passenger traffic, the line is served by two Inter-City services and the Hamburg-Köln-Express:

Line	Route	Interval
	Hamburg-Altona – Hamburg – Osnabrück – Münster (Westf) – Gelsenkirchen – Essen – Duisburg – Düsseldorf – Cologne	A single train pair Fri–Sun
IC 26	(Rostock / Flensburg –) Hamburg – Osnabrück – Münster (Westf) – Recklinghausen – Gelsenkirchen – Essen – Duisburg – Düsseldorf – Cologne	Individual trains, Fri/Sun
IC 32	Münster (Westf) – Recklinghausen – Wanne-Eickel – Gelsenkirchen – Essen – Duisburg – Düsseldorf – Köln – Koblenz – Mannheim – Stuttgart – Ulm – Lindau – Innsbruck	One train daily

In regional transport, the line is served, on behalf of the Verkehrsverbund Rhein-Ruhr, by the following Regional-Express, Regionalbahn and S-Bahn lines:

Line	Name	Route	Interval
RE 2	Rhein-Haard-Express	Münster (Westf) – Recklinghausen – Wanne-Eickel – Gelsenkirchen – Essen – Duisburg – Düsseldorf	Hourly
RB 42	Haard-Bahn	Münster (Westf) – Dülmen – Haltern am See – Recklinghausen – Wanne-Eickel – Gelsenkirchen – Essen – Duisburg – Krefeld – Viersen – Mönchengladbach	Hourly + extra services in the peak between Haltern and Essen
S2	S-Bahn	Dortmund – Herne – Wanne-Eickel – Gelsenkirchen – Gelsenkirchen-Rotthausen – Essen-Kray Nord – Essen	Hourly
