= Gelsenkirchen-Rotthausen station =

Railway station in Gelsenkirchen, Germany

Gelsenkirchen Rotthausen
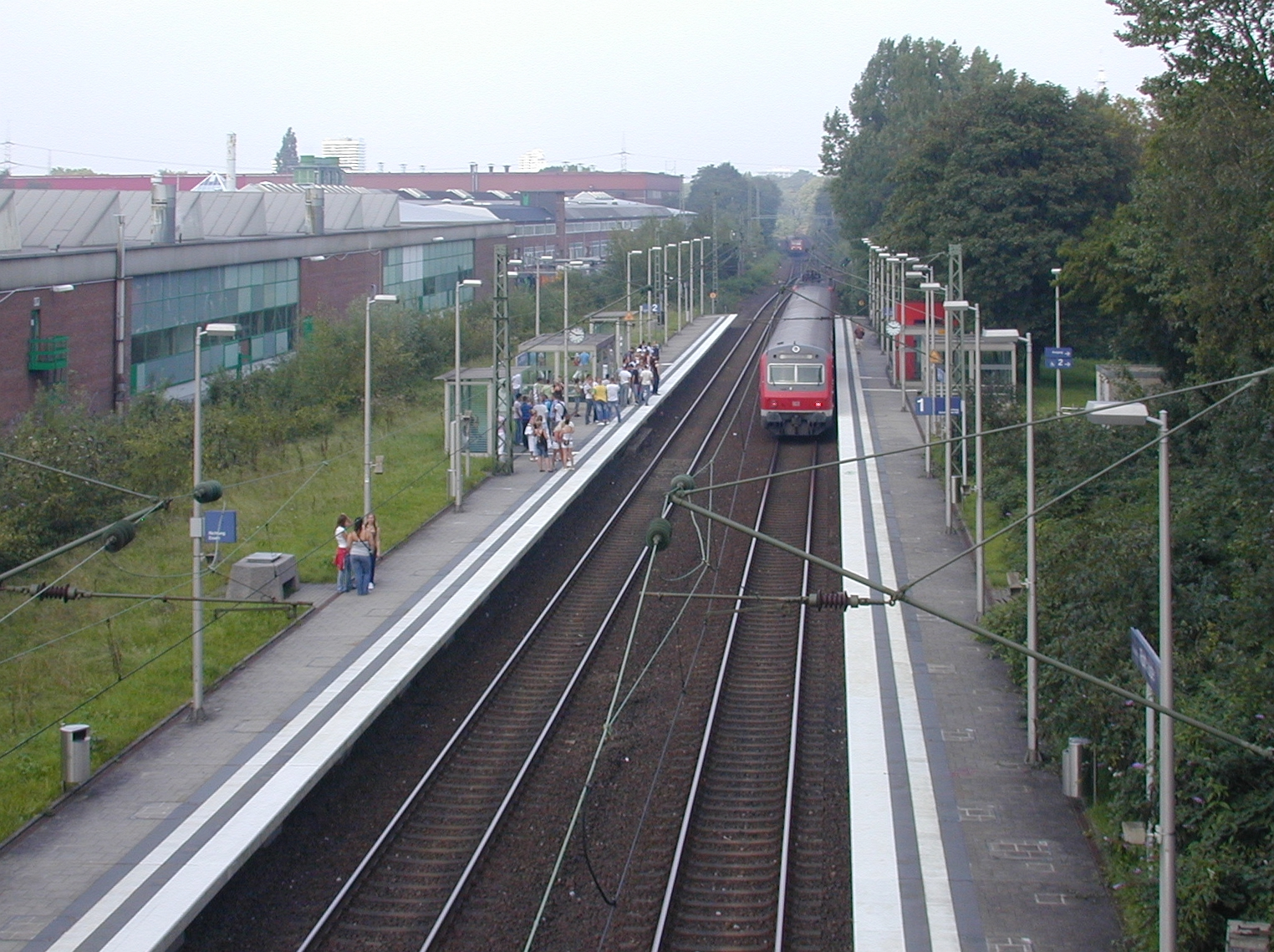
- Gelsenkirchen-Rotthausen station in 2007

General information
- Location: Karl-Mayer-Straße 58, Rotthausen, Gelsenkirchen, NRW; Germany
- Coordinates: 51°29′33″N 7°05′20″E
- Owner: DB Netz
- Operator: DB Station&Service
- Line: Essen–Gelsenkirchen railway
- Platforms: 2

Construction
- Accessible: Yes

Other information
- Station code: 2057
- DS100 code: EGRO
- IBNR: 8002227
- Category: 6
- Fare zone: VRR: 260
- Website: www.bahnhof.de

History
- Opened: 1876
- Former names: Dahlbusch; Dahlbusch-Rotthausen; Rotthausen (Kr.Essen)

Services
Preceding station	Rhine-Ruhr S-Bahn	Following station
Essen-Kray Nord towards Essen Hbf	S2	Gelsenkirchen Hbf towards Dortmund Hbf
Location

Gelsenkirchen-Rotthausen is a railway station on the Essen–Gelsenkirchen railway situated in Gelsenkirchen in western Germany. It is classified by Deutsche Bahn as a category 6 station. It is served by Rhine-Ruhr S-Bahn line S2, and by bus route 381 (Gelsenkirchen – Erle – Resse/Buer), operated by BOGESTRA.
