= Friedenstunnel =

Underpass in Germany

Coordinates: 53.0812°N 8.8201°E

The Friedenstunnel (Peace Tunnel), formerly named the Rembertitunnel, is an underpass in Bremen's Schwachhausen district that runs below the Wanne-Eickel-Hamburg and Wunstorf-Bremen railway lines. It connecting Parkallee to Rembertistraße in the south.

The underpass was renamed on 6 September 2015 as part of the Peace Tunnel project. This initiative aims to promote peaceful coexistence among religions and cultures through artwork, texts displayed in the tunnel, and events fostering tolerance and understanding. The Peace Tunnel is intended to symbolize the cosmopolitan nature of the city of Bremen.

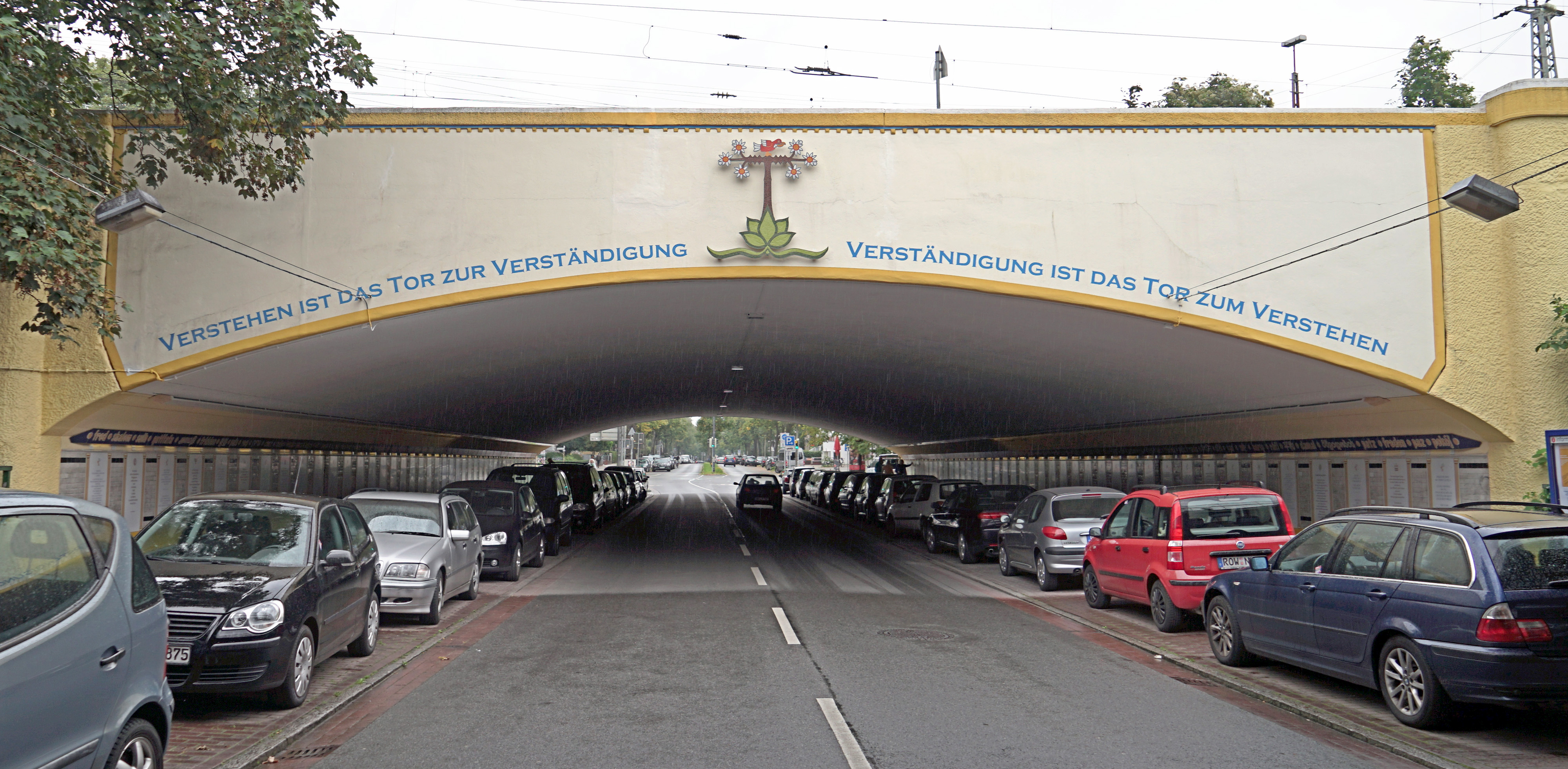
Friedenstunnel (former Rembertitunnel) - Parkallee side

== History ==
The Tunnel Project Community of Interest (Interessengemeinschaft Tunnel-Projekt) was the initiative of freelance graphic designer, artist, art teacher and lecturer Regina Heygster, who established the association Bremen Sets an Example of the Connection between Religious Communities e. V. on 16 October 2003. The association was renamed Friedenstunnel - Bremen Sets an Example e. V. on 14 March 2011. Her mosaic art is incorporated in the design of the Peace Tunnel.

As a response to the attacks of September 11, 2001, Heygster contacted Bremen's religious communities, the Deutsche Bahn railway infrastructure management subsidiary DB Netz AG, and the Bremen City Hall in 2001 and 2002 with a proposal to set up a joint sign of peace. The busy Rembertitunnel was to provide the public space for the project.

The first Peace Tunnel model was created in 2002 and presented to religious communities at DB Netz AG, the town hall, and the chamber of commerce. In 2003, a walk-in model was developed and exhibited, with significant progress beginning in 2004 after the association's establishment in late 2003.

== Installations ==
Following the exhibition phase in 2002 and 2003, implementation of the project began. In 2006, a large print banner was mounted on the Rembertitunnel Parkallee street-front, with several exchangeable tarpaulins that could be installed over the large banner. In 2007, the same was done on the An der Weide side of the tunnel entrance. Redesign of the tunnel frontage and interior was stepped up from 2007, when the tunnel structure was inspected prior to renovations. Work included sandblasting, application of dehumidifying plaster and painting, carried out on the Parkallee side in 2008 and the An der Weide side in 2009 and 2010. The first mosaic, Dove–Key Emblem, considered the symbol of the Peace Tunnel, was installed in 2008.

The Garden of the Religions was planted in 2009 at the Parkallee entrance and the concrete reliefs made for the two 3.2-metre-high (10 ft) mosaic peace trees Oak and Palm. The trees, at either side of the Parkallee entrance, were completed in 2010 and 2011. The An der Weide frontage was completed first, and was inaugurated in 2011.

In 2012, the Tree of Life–Lotus Mosaic was built over the An der Weide entrance as a counterpart to the Dove–Key Emblem. It tops a message over the An der Weide entrance, "Understanding is the gateway to understanding - understanding is the door to understanding" ("Verstehen its das Tür our Verständigung - Verständigung ist das Tür zum Verstehen"). In 2013 a large banner was installed by the An der Weide entrance with the message "Peace starts small" ("Frieden fängt klein an").

In 2014 and 2015, the tunnel interior was remodeled. Work involved wet abrasive blasting, sealing of the interior vault, side wall redesign and painting. In 2015, a 100-metre-long (330 ft) long peace mosaic frieze displaying the word "peace" in 135 languages was installed. 82 text panels featuring messages of peace and wisdom from different religions and cultures were designed. The tunnel lighting was redesigned, using LEDs to illuminate the vault of the tunnel to represent the arch of the sky and light the side wall mosaic. The former Rembertitunnel was renamed Friedenstunnel at the official Peace Tunnel inauguration on 6 September 2015.

== Community events ==
The tunnel artwork was developed in parallel with the construction project. The focus of the artwork is integration policies and community affairs, covering the fields of culture, interfaith relations and peace education. A series of lectures, events and activities have furthered the goal of fostering understanding between religions and cultures to promote diversity, understanding and tolerance.

Community outreach work began in May−June 2004, with the launch of the ongoing debate series "Frieden konkret". This annual event, held in Bremen City Hall, involves podium discussions on current topic between the association's religious representatives, with active participation from the audience encouraged.

"Peace starts small" is a schools project for the promotion of peace, launched in 2008. To date, some 4,500 children and young people have worked on the theme of peace and understanding. The results of their work are then presented in the City Hall. The pupils of kindergartens and schools have contributed their ideas on peaceful coexistence, and in 2013 and 2015 daycare centers also participated in the program. In cooperation with the Bremen Council for Integration, in 2014 the project was run with organizations working with refugee children and adolescents.

"Invite religions", run twice a year since 2012, is an open door project that offers participants the opportunity to get to know the different religious communities. In addition to answering questions about the different religious communities, these evening sessions are used to communicate the latest news about the tunnel.

The first Friedenstunnel tours were conducted in 2016.

In 2017, the first "Peace-sounds in the Peace Tunnel" concert series was held between April and October. The 2 April 2017 concert featured Ari Ariwodo singing gospel. The "Peace-sounds" concert of 27 May 2018 was held as part of a religious service celebrating completion of the painting on the Parkallee frontage. A "Peace-sound" 2018 musical review will be held at the end of the 2018.

An annual benefit concert is held on 11 September in tribute to the victims of the September 11 attacks and to symbolize the pursuit of peace. The event features musical performances, speeches, and readings.

The Friedensstunnel association continues to introduce new events in its schedule and, in addition to its own events and lectures, participates in many other initiatives. It contributes every year to Bremen Integration Week and Mental Health Week.

== Support ==
The association and project initiator Regina Heygster collected donations amounting to 110,000 euros for implementation of the Peace Tunnel project.

Further funding is required to cover ongoing construction and other costs, which include tunnel and artwork maintenance, and electricity for illumination of the sky vault, text panels and mosaic frieze. The Parkallee street-front was renovated in 2018. One source of funding is paid sponsorship of tunnel artwork. Many of the 135 "Peace" mosaic panels and 82 peace and wisdom texts have been claimed, but a number of sponsorship opportunities remain available.
