= Essen-Kray Nord station =

Railway station in Essen, Germany

Essen Kray Nord
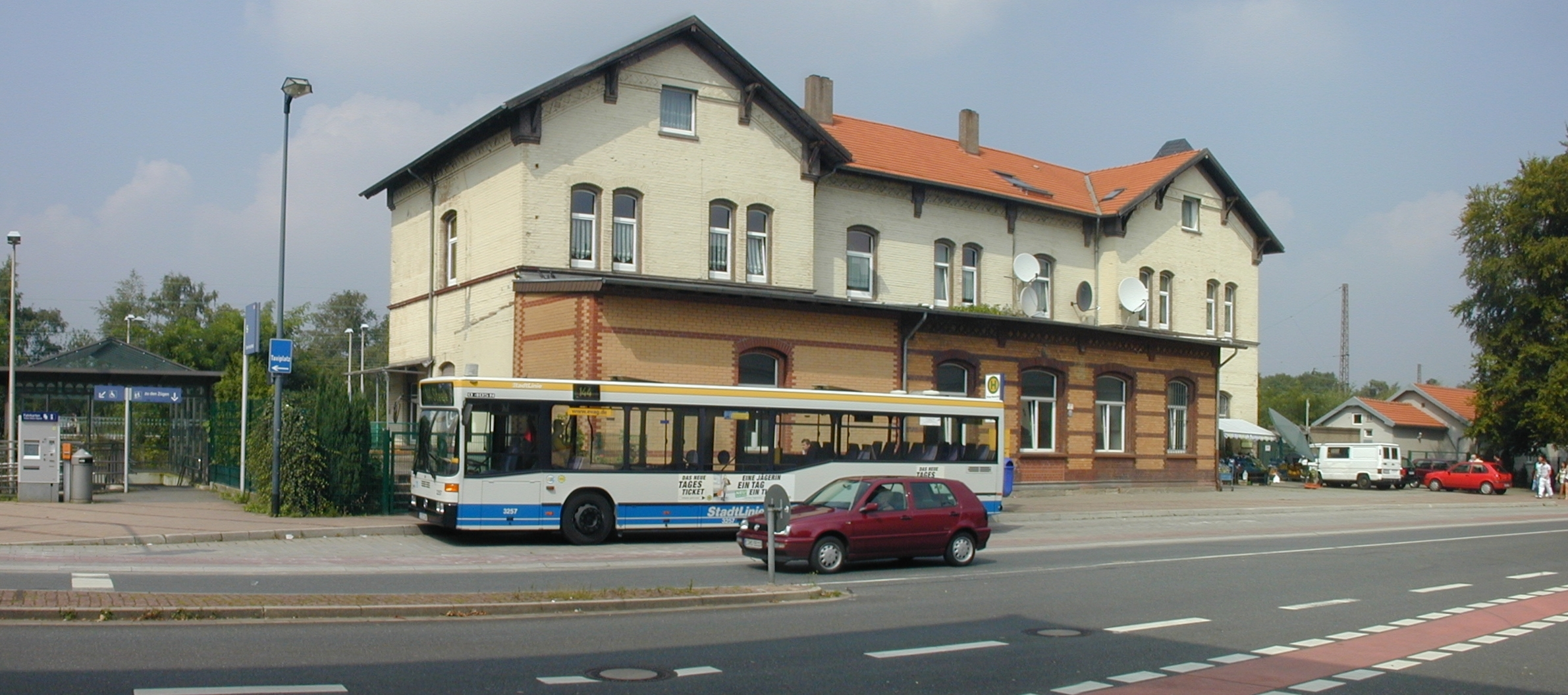
- Essen-Kray Nord station in 2007

General information
- Location: Krayerstr. 263, Essen, NRW; Germany
- Coordinates: 51°28′9″N 7°4′51″E
- Owner: DB Netz
- Operator: DB Station&Service
- Line: Essen–Gelsenkirchen
- Platforms: 2

Construction
- Accessible: Yes

Other information
- Station code: 1707
- DS100 code: EEKN
- IBNR: 8001910
- Category: 6
- Fare zone: VRR: 356
- Website: www.bahnhof.de

History
- Opened: 16 April 1872

Services
Preceding station	Rhine-Ruhr S-Bahn	Following station
Essen Hbf Terminus	S2	Gelsenkirchen-Rotthausen towards Dortmund Hbf
Location

Essen-Kray Nord is a railway station on the Essen–Gelsenkirchen railway situated in Essen in western Germany. It is classified by Deutsche Bahn as a category 6 station. It is served by Rhine-Ruhr S-Bahn line S2 and by bus routes 144 (Steele – Annental – Stadtwaldplatz), 146 (Leithe Wackenberg + Essen Hbf – Stadtwald – Heisingen), 147 (Porscheplatz – Haarzopf Erbach + Grimbergstr), 170 (Steele + Schonnebeck – Katernberg – Altenessen – Borbeck) and 194 (Gelsenkirchen Hbf + Steele – Stadtwald – Haarzopf) operated by Ruhrbahn.
