= Metropolitan (train) =

Former branded service of Deutsche Bahn

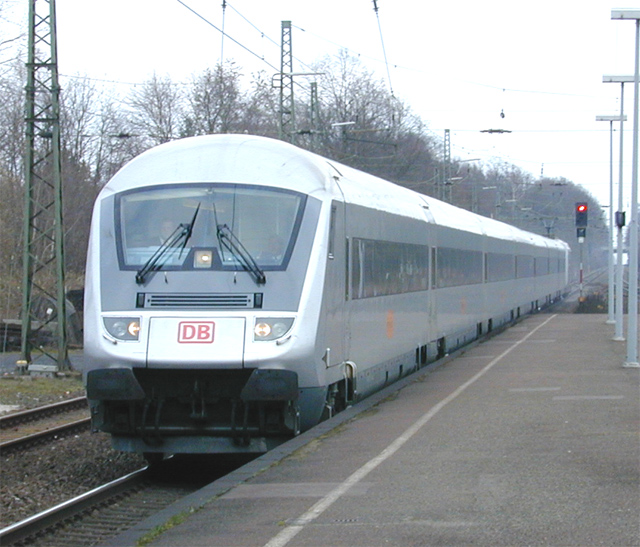
- Metropolitan trainset in 2002

Overview
- Fleet: 4 locomotives, 2 trainsets
- Stations called at: 4
- Parent company: DB Fernverkehr; Deutsche Bahn
- Headquarters: Bad Homburg
- Locale: Germany
- Dates of operation: 1 August 1999–11 December 2004; 10 December 2021 (Note: While the named service Metropolitan was ended in 2004, the trainsets continued in InterCity and Intercity Express service until the end of 2021.)
- Successor: ICE Sprinter

Technical
- Track gauge: 1,435 mm (4 ft 8 1/2 in)
- Electrification: 15 kV AC, 16.7 Hz
- Operating speed: 200 km/h (120 mph), 220 km/h (140 mph)

Metropolitan (stylised as MetropolitaN) was the brand name of a German premium passenger train service between the cities of Cologne and Hamburg. Meant as an alternative to air transport, the (at its start) first-class-only trains were operated from 1 August 1999 until 11 December 2004 by the Metropolitan Express Train GmbH (MET GmbH) based in Bad Homburg, a wholly owned subsidiary of the DB Fernverkehr wholly owned subsidiary of Deutsche Bahn AG.

Service was discontinued in December 2004 due to low usage and profitability; the trainsets were deployed in InterCity and Intercity Express traffic before being retired at the end of 2021, when they were offered for sale. As the search for a buyer fell through, the trainsets were scrapped as of 2024.

== History ==
=== Introduction ===
The beginning of operations was preceded by investigations into ten routes where the train could compete with plane travel. The Cologne–Hamburg route received the highest value in the investigations, with the Frankfurt–Munich route placing second. Metropolitan service was originally scheduled to begin on 13 June 1999. Due to delays in train delivery and crew training, service did not begin until 1 August. Starting on 1 July 1999, test runs were conducted using the first of the two trainsets to collect operating experience. Between 1 August 1999 and the termination of service on 11 December 2004, Metropolitan trains traveled between Köln Hauptbahnhof and Hamburg Hauptbahnhof, with stops at Düsseldorf Hauptbahnhof and Essen Hauptbahnhof. However, by the end of 1999, trains were occupied to only 20 percent capacity, below the break-even point of 53 percent. Two options were considered: an extension on the Hamburg-Berlin route and the removal of the requirement to reserve seats in advance; neither option was adopted.

=== Decline ===
During all five years of Metropolitan service, utilization was far below the trains' capacity and that of standard long-distance service. About two months after the beginning of operation, the trains had utilization rates of 50 to 60 percent on Monday mornings and Friday evenings, but were only filled to 30 percent capacity on average. In the first two years, average utilization increased to 35 to 40 percent, still below the break-even point. Only during trade fair days did utilization reach satisfactory levels. Passenger numbers decreased in the first quarter of 2003, when the Metropolitan service lost one fourth of its passengers, according to Deutsche Bahn, which blamed the rise of low-cost airlines.

At a financial press conference on 16 August 2004, Deutsche Bahn confirmed a report that Metropolitan service would be discontinued, but did not specify a date of discontinuation. The service was discontinued due to low utilization and lack of profitability. According to a report by the media, MET GmbH operated at a loss of €3.8 million in 2003 with a turnover of €21.3 million. The average occupancy of the trains was only 35 percent rather than the planned 50 percent. Metropolitan trains continued to run until the next regular timetable change on 11 December 2004. Service was replaced with ICE Sprinter trains.

=== Further usage ===
The two trainsets were initially intended to be parked, though DB Fernverkehr decided to reuse the trains in long-distance traffic. They were externally modified to prepare them for service, being repainted in the standard DB colors and fitted with features such as route sign holders. However, the interiors were unchanged. The two Traveller cars and three other cars were reassigned to second class, while two were assigned to first class. After the timetable change on 13 December 2009, the two seven-car trains were converted into one eleven-car train and one three-car train, though this was reverted in March 2011. The last Metropolitan train ran on 10 December 2021, and the train's control car was decorated with the Metropolitan logo. The use of the two trains ceased after the timetable change in December 2021; the trains were listed for sale. Photos in 2024 show the stock being cut up and scrapped.

== Corporate affairs ==
=== Operator ===
The operating company, Metropolitan Express Train GmbH, was established in December 1996 as a subsidiary of DB Fernverkehr (then named DB Reise&Touristik), itself a subsidiary of Deutsche Bahn AG. MET GmbH was the fourth company besides DB Reise&Touristik (the first three companies being CityNightLine, Thalys, and Cisalpino) to operate long-distance trains in Germany after the 1994 rail reform. After the service was discontinued in December 2004, MET GmbH was dissolved and reacquired by DB Fernverkehr.

=== Business figures ===
Business information
Fiscal year	Total equity (million €)	Turnover (million €)	Change in turnover (%)	Employees (Note: This count only includes the administrative staff, not the rail crews.)	Citation
1999	4.3	5.6	N/A	11	
2000	4.3	16.0	184.2	11	
2001	4.3	18.8	17.7	12	
2002	4.4	20.6	9.8	11	
2003	4.4	16.1	-22.1	12	
2004	N/A	N/A	N/A	N/A	(Note: Deutsche Bahn did not publish data for FY 2004 as MET GmbH had already been dissolved by the time of publication.)

== Rolling stock ==
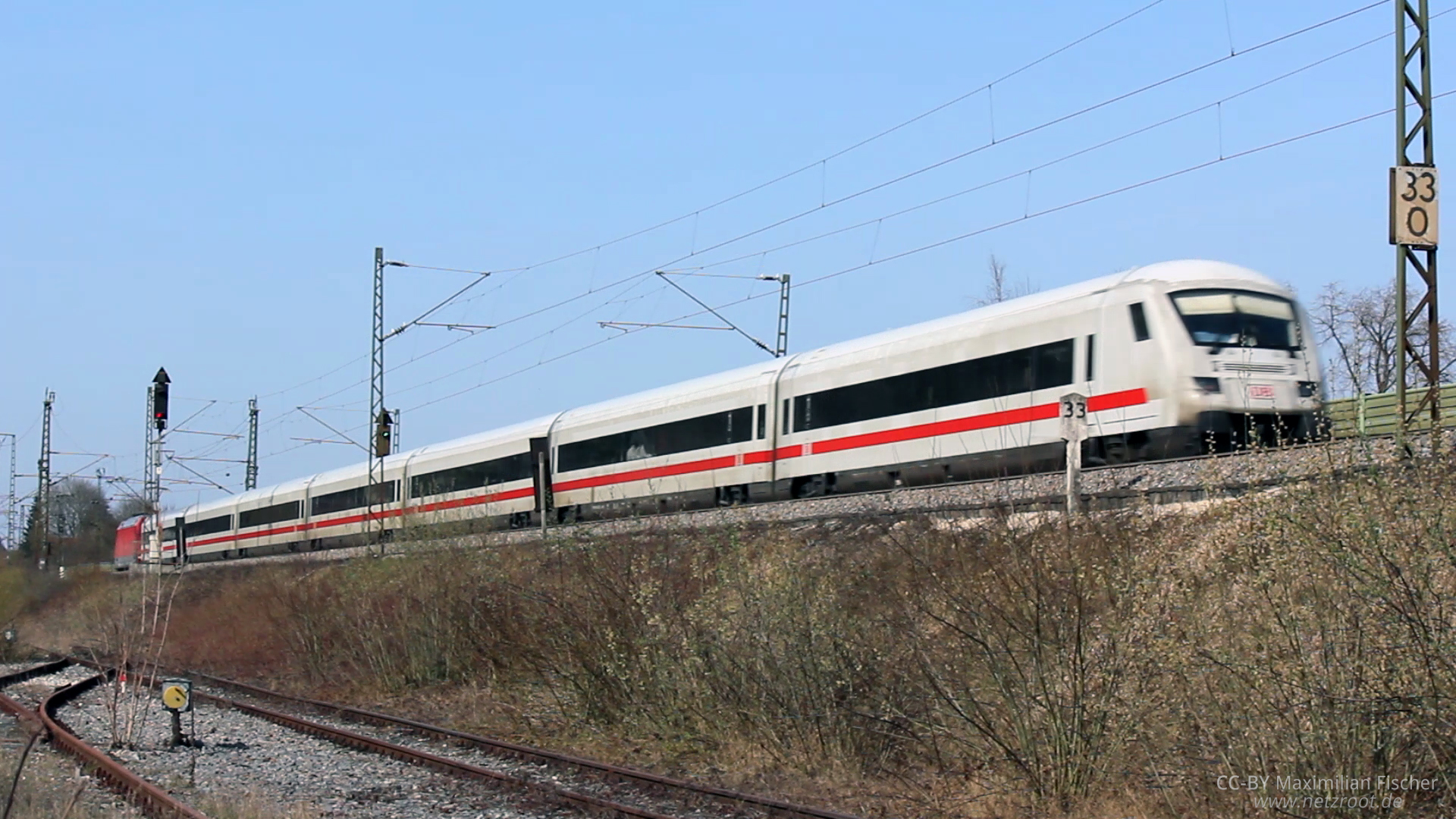
A former and since repainted Metropolitan trainset after reassignment to InterCity services.

Metropolitan Express Train GmbH ordered two specially made trainsets of seven cars each from the manufacturer FTD Fahrzeugtechnik Dessau in November 1997. The interiors of the cars were produced by Deutsche Werkstätten Hellerau. An option was available for two additional trainsets with different interiors. From a technical perspective, the Metropolitan trainsets are conventional push-pull trains consisting of a locomotive, cars, and a control car. Both sets consist of seven cars, each 26.4 m (87 ft) long. The train's total length, including the Class 101 locomotive, is 204 m (669 ft). The Metropolitan was presented at the 1999 ITB Berlin trade show. The first trainset was delivered on 14 June 1999; the second was delivered on 12 July. Both trains were based at the depot in Eidelstedt.

Before the beginning of production, Deutsche Bahn AG's board of directors considered removing two ICE 2 trainsets from production and modifying them with a special interior for the Metropolitan. Several cars were painted in Metropolitan colors and prepared for conversion. This plan was cancelled due to high costs and time constraints. The planned conversion of preexisting cars was also cancelled. The trainsets themselves however were based on the ICE 2's cars.

The Metropolitan trains had an operational top speed of 220 km/h (140 mph), though they were not used at speeds higher than 200 km/h (120 mph) until 2009 when both seven-car trains were merged into a single eleven-car trainset. This is the fastest top speed of any conventional locomotive-hauled train in Germany; only Intercity Express trains have higher top speeds. The Metropolitan cars were slightly larger than standard InterCity cars with an empty mass of 55 to 59 tonnes and a width of 2,824 mm (111.2 in). Depending on the number of seats and interior layout, the cars weighted between 59 and 63 tonnes when fully loaded. Prior to 2010, they were operationally grouped with the ICE 1 and ICE 2 trains as ICE-A, and from 2011 to 2021, they were grouped as IC-A and operationally dispatched as ICE, IC, or MET by DB Netz. These operational classifications permitted operation exclusively on lines approved for ICE 1 and ICE 2 trains. The trains are equipped to operate using 15 kV 16.7 Hz head-end power. The Metropolitan trainsets were not approved for operation on third-party networks. When the trainsets were operated using locomotives other than the four modified Class 101 locomotives, their speed was limited to 200 km/h (120 mph).

== Service categories ==
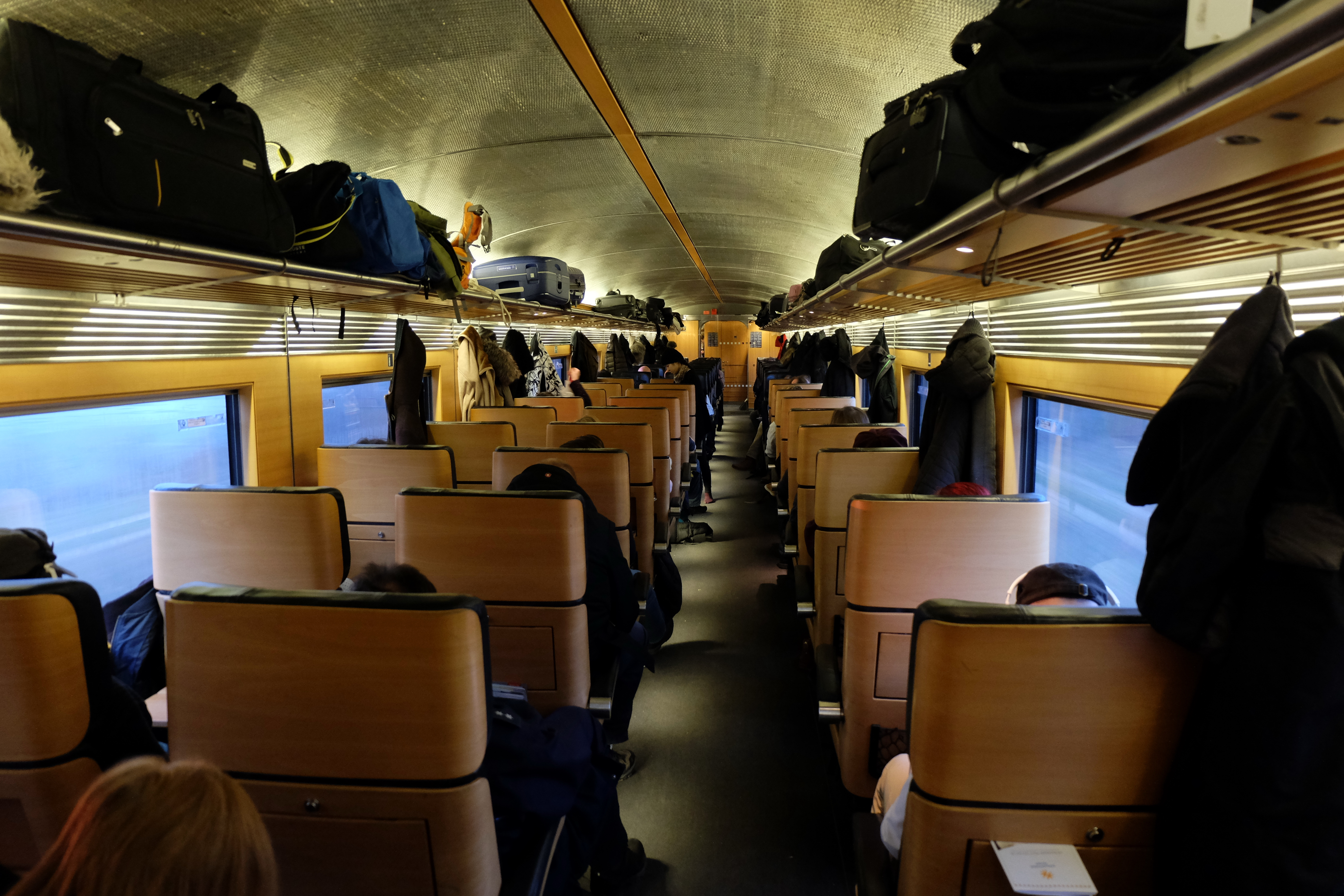
First class interior

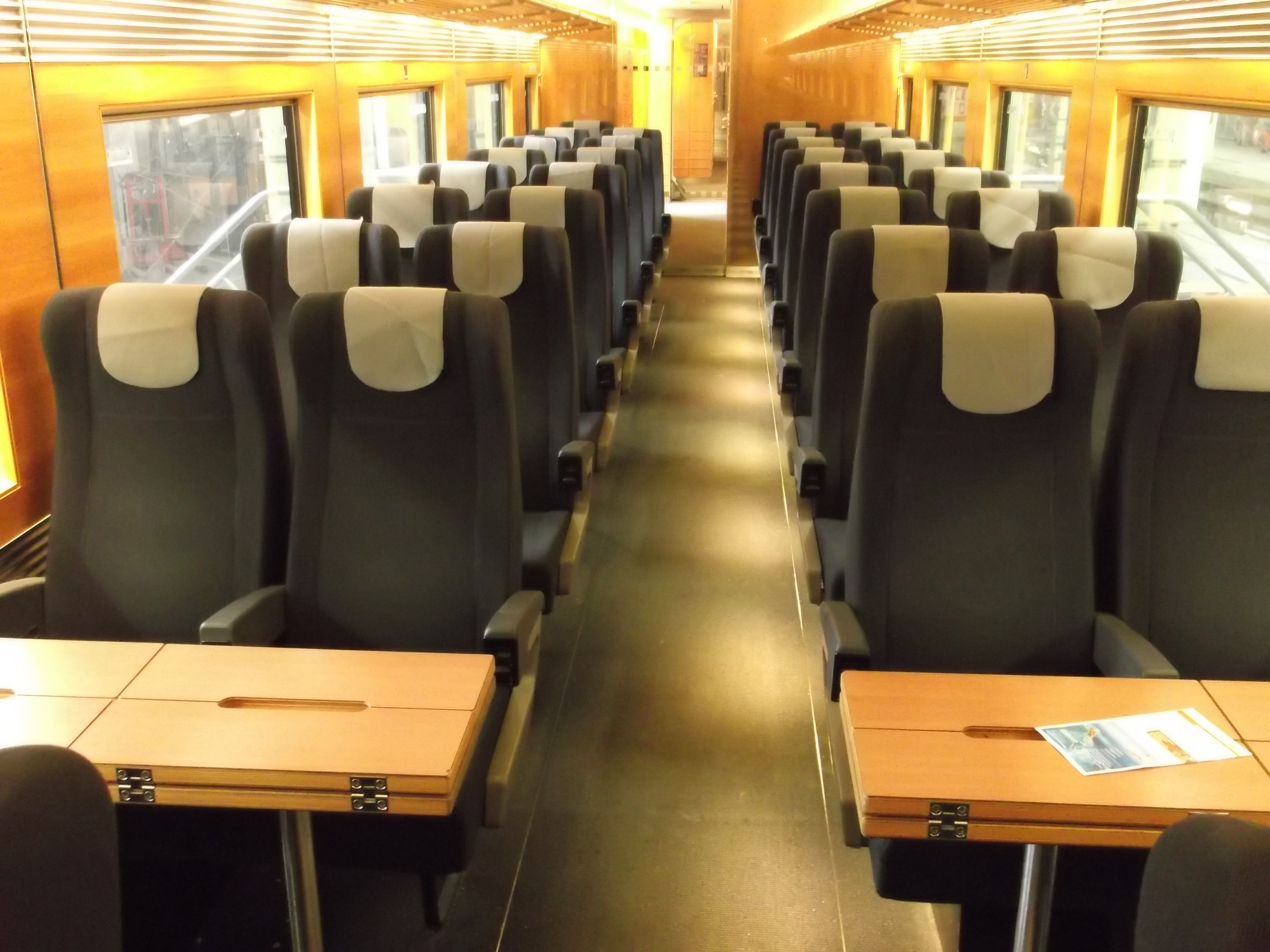
Traveller class interior

=== First Class ===
The Metropolitan was the only Deutsche Bahn service that was not divided into separate travel classes. Instead, three categories of first-class service were provided:

- Two Silence cars intended for resting passengers. A free pillow and blanket were provided, as well as earplugs and headphones. The use of phones and laptops was discouraged. These two cars were located at the end of the train.
- Three Office cars intended for working travelers. Seats included in-seat power outlets and cell phone repeaters. This category contained a cocktail and espresso bar as well as four-seat tables for work interviews.
- Two Club cars were available for passengers who did not want to work or sleep. Portable DVD players and films could be borrowed free of charge. This section also contained a cocktail and espresso bar and wireless repeaters, similar to the Office section. Car number 7 was designed to be accessible.

=== Traveller Class ===
Starting on 1 September 2001, MET GmbH introduced a fourth travel category named Traveller in an attempt to increase train utilization, along with offering discounted prices for return tickets. The new class was less comfortable than the three existing categories and acted as a second class for the Metropolitan trains.

Cars 1 and 5 (renumbered to cars 1 and 2) were re-equipped with four-abreast seating arrangements, replacing their original three-abreast seating. Each train received 145 new seats to replace the original 114. The original seats were removed and sold on eBay by Deutsche Bahn AG. The total capacity of each train was increased by 8.8 percent from 351 to 382 seats. However, as the Traveller cars were taken from the Office and Silence categories, the capacity of those categories was reduced.

== See also ==
- Rheingold (train)
- Train categories in Europe
