= Kattenvenne =

Village in Germany

Coordinates: 52°07′N 7°52′E

Kattenvenne is a village in Germany (North Rhine-Westphalia) about 23 km northeast from Münster. It is part of the municipality Lienen.

== History ==
The name Kattenvenne is first mentioned in a contract of the year 836 in which it is called "Hadunveni"(Latin). A second mentioning is found in a document of 1312. In the Middle Ages Kattenvenne was known for its peat moors. In the 18th century 23 farms were documented here.

The village's initial development coincided with the construction of the railway between Münster and Osnabrück (1868–1871). Some prisoners of the French-German War (1870) must have been working here, too. The Kattenvenne railway station was established in 1873. Construction of the church began with the laying of the cornerstone in 1887 and was completed the following year. The first service was conducted by Pastor Philips in the unfinished church building on Christmas 1887. A tower was added to the front of the church in 1897. Since the end of the 19th century economy developed rapidly. As a consequence the population more than tripled within the next 130 years, even though 400 persons emigrated to North America and 230 died in the two world wars.

== Sports ==
The Kattenvenne handball team TVK 1927 plays in the North Rhine-Westphalia Pampers League.
