= Rhein-Haard-Express =

Regional-Express service in North Rhine-Westphalia, Germany

RE 2 Rhein-Haard-Express
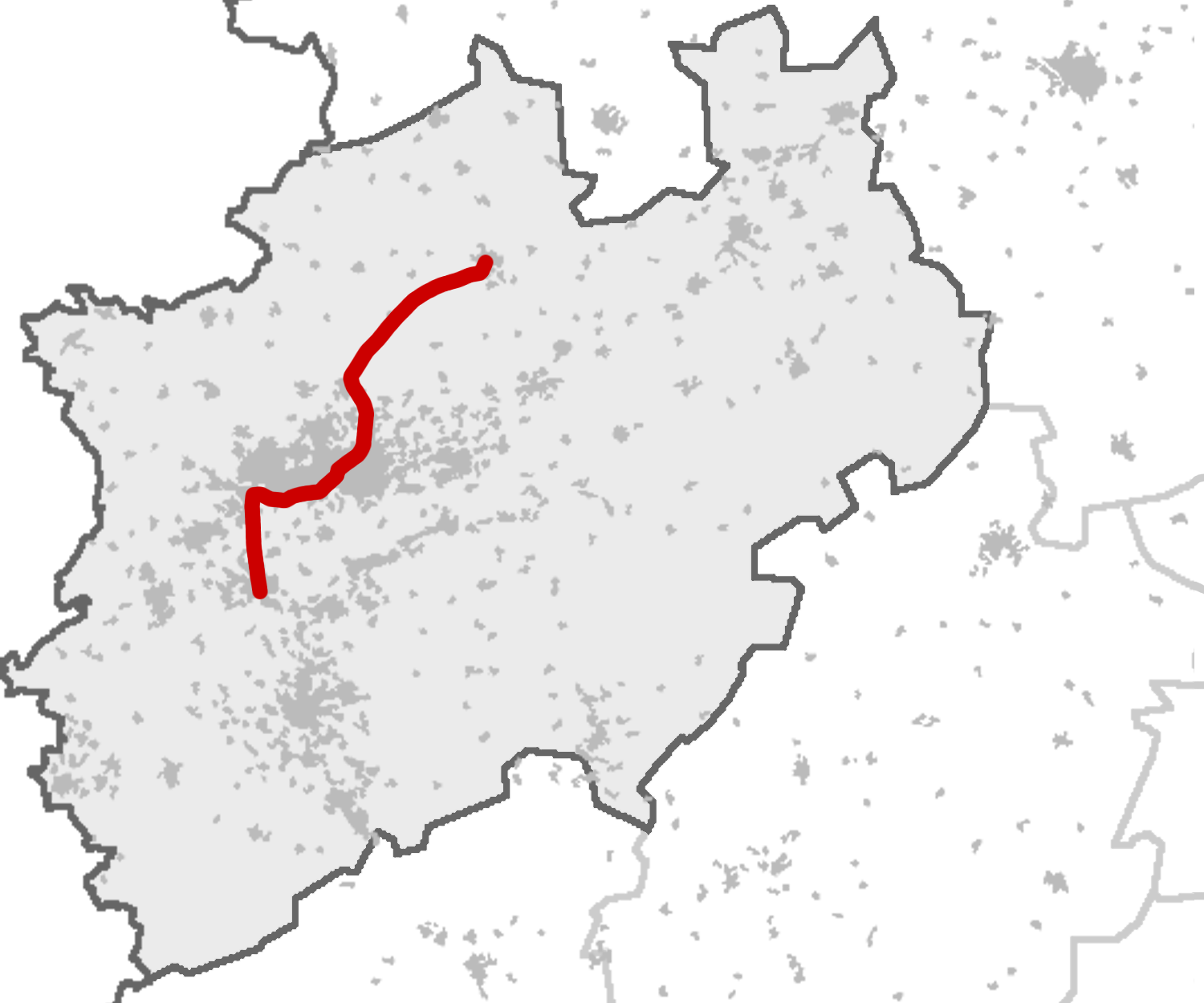

Overview
- Locale: North Rhine-Westphalia,Lower Saxony, Germany

Service
- Route number: 425
- Operator(s): National Express Germany

Technical
- Line length: 144 km (89 mi)
- Operating speed: 160 km/h (99 mph) (maximum)

RE 42 Niers-Haard-Express
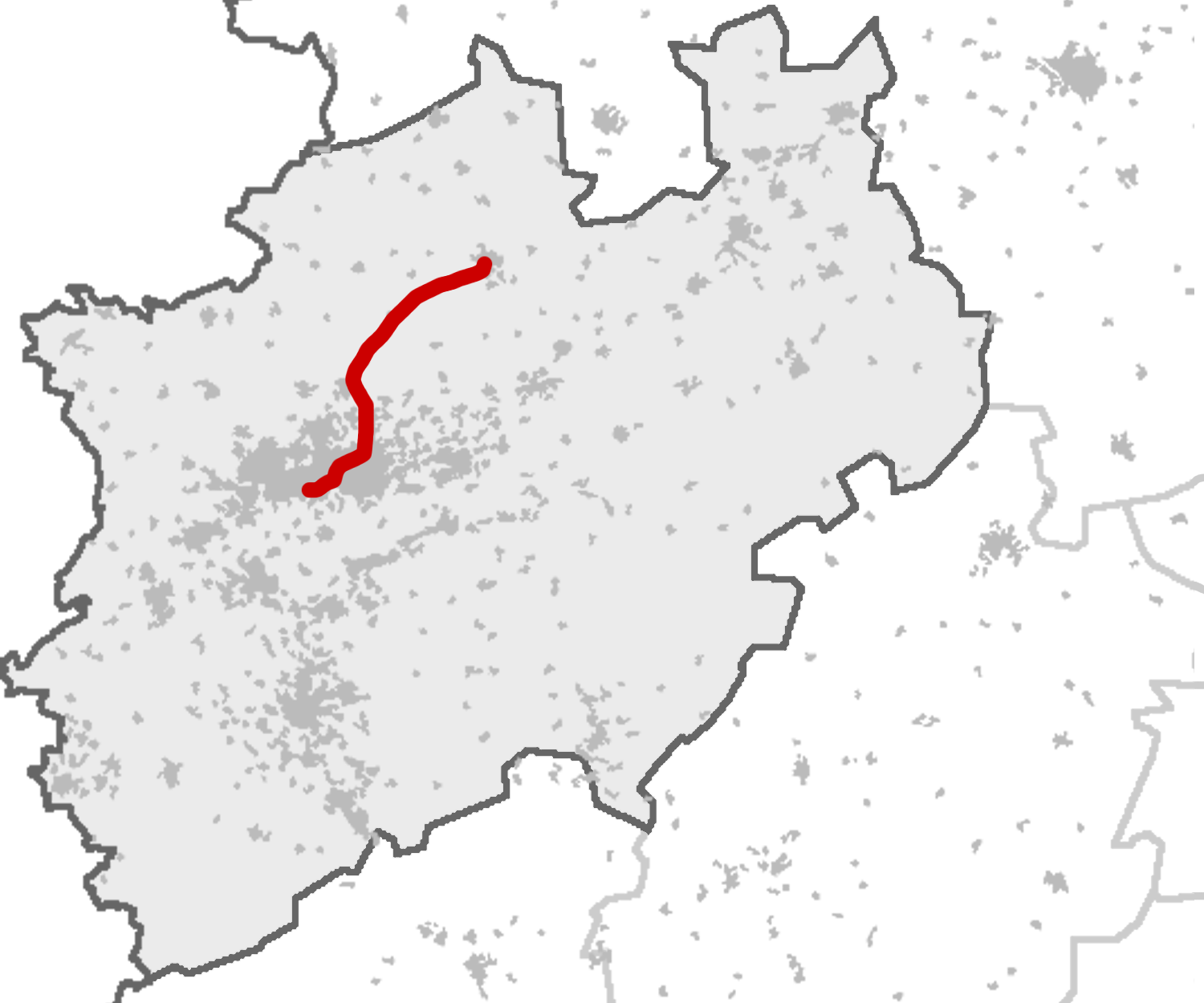

Overview
- Locale: North Rhine-Westphalia, Germany

Service
- Route number: 425

Technical
- Line length: 123 km (76 mi)
- Operating speed: 160 km/h (99 mph) (maximum)

The Rhein-Haard-Express (RE 2) is a Regional-Express service in the German state of North Rhine-Westphalia (NRW), running from Osnabrück via Münster, Recklinghausen, Gelsenkirchen, Essen and Duisburg to Düsseldorf.

The Haard-Bahn (RE 42) operated at an interval of about half an hour after RE 2 on the section between Münster and Essen. This differed only by an additional stop in Recklinghausen Süd, which RE 2 stops at only in the off-peak.

On 11 December 2016, the Haard-Bahn changed its name to Niers-Haard-Express (RE 42) and extended to Duisburg, Krefeld and Mönchengladbach. Since December 2019, the additional trains in the peak hour between Haltern am See and Essen have been replaced by a service every 30 minutes between Münster and Essen.

== History ==
The Rhein-Haard-Express operated from 1998 to 2002 as the Haard-Express only between Münster and Essen. From the timetable change in December 2002, it ran via Duisburg to Mönchengladbach, taking over the Duisburg–Mönchengladbach section from the Rhein-Emscher-Express (RE 3), which ran to Düsseldorf instead.

With the timetable change on 12 December 2010 there was another exchange of routes with the Duisburg–Mönchengladbach section operated by the Rhein-Hellweg-Express (RE 11), which now runs hourly between Hamm and Mönchengladbach.

In return the Rhein-Haard-Express took over the Duisburg–Düsseldorf section and also operates as an hourly service. In this section, there are normally five Regional-Express services per hour (RE 1, 2, 3, 5 and 6), and four Regional-Express trains per hour on the Essen-Duisburg section (RE 1, 2, 6 and 11).

Since the timetable change on 12 December 2010, the Rhein-Haard-Express trains have operated with five instead of four carriages. After an EU-wide tender, DB Regio NRW contract to operate the service has been extended from December 2014 to December 2029.

With the timetable change in December 2016, there was a further change in the route of the service. The RE 11 service returned to its former route between Duisburg and Düsseldorf. The section of the RE 2's former route between Essen to Mönchengladbach, was not resumed by the Rhein-Haardt-Express. Instead, the Haard-Bahn (RB 42), which previously ran between Münster and Essen on the same route as the Rhein-Haardt-Express, was extended to Mönchengladbach and renamed the Rhein-Haard-Express (RE 42). This reflects the fact that the train does not stop at every station between Duisburg and Mönchengladbach, unlike the parallel Rhein-Niers-Bahn (RB 33) and Emscher-Niederrhein-Bahn (RB 35), so it was considered appropriate to designate it as an "express".

At the timetable change in December 2019, the Rhein-Haard-Express on the Münster–Essen section was accelerated by skipping stops and extended to the Lower Saxony regional centre of Osnabrück. At the same time, the Niers-Haard-Express began operating at half-hourly intervals on this section, stopping at all intermediate stations.

== Route ==
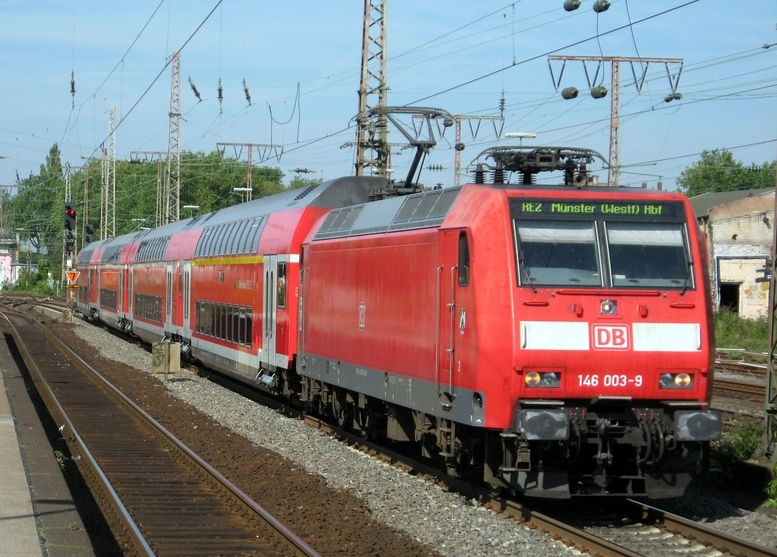
Rhein-Haard Express operated by Deutsche Bahn

The Rhein-Haard-Express runs daily every hour and utilises five railway lines:

- The Wanne-Eickel–Hamburg railway between Osnabrück and Wanne-Eickel (which is also used by various Intercity services and Regional-Express service RE 42),
- The Duisburg–Dortmund railway between Wanne-Eickel and Gelsenkirchen (shared with a variety of traffic and without intervening stations),
- The whole of the Essen–Gelsenkirchen railway (shared with RE 42 and Rhine-Ruhr S-Bahn line S 2)
- The Dortmund–Duisburg line between Essen and Duisburg (on the long-distance tracks, which is used by all types of regional and long distance traffic),
- The Cologne–Duisburg railway between Duisburg and Düsseldorf. In this four to six track section the Rhein-Haard-Express uses the S-Bahn tracks or the so-called "local" tracks where they exist, along with the Rhein-Emscher-Express (RE 3), Rhein-Weser-Express (RE 6), Rhein-Hellweg-Express (RE 11) and the Rhein-IJssel-Express (RE 19). Only the NRW-Express (RE 1) and the Rhein-Express (RE 5) use the long-distance tracks.

== Rail services ==
The Rhein-Haard-Express runs every hour and stops between Wanne-Eickel and Münster only in Recklinghausen Hbf, Haltern am See and Dülmen, vur stopping at every stop north of Münster. It runs on a long section parallel to S-Bahn lines and from Münster to Duisburg it runs on the same route as the Niers-Haard-Express (RE 42).

The RE 2 is operated by DB Regio AG, using push-pull trains of five double-deck carriages hauled by class 146 electric locomotives at speeds of up to 160 km/h. The RE 42 is operated with class 1428 (Stadler FLIRT) sets, which are slower that the RE 2 trains but have better acceleration. As a result, the Rhein-Haard-Express takes two minutes longer between Essen and Münster than the Niers-Haard-Express. The average speed is 71 km/h.

In the evening or at night, when the RE 42 no longer runs, the Rhein-Haard-Express stops at all stations between Essen and Münster.

The Rhein-Haard-Express was the last RE line in North Rhine-Westphalia that still featured a so-called ZugCafé (dining car). In recent years, this bistro was only open during the peak hour from Monday to Friday. With the new contract awarded to DB Regio AG for the operation of the service from 14 December 2014, continued operation of the bistro was omitted.

The sets have been converted for the Rhein-Haard-Express, so that the first class seating is now located in the control car. This is where step-free access and a toilet for the disabled is located, along with bicycle parking spaces. The control car heads the trains running towards Düsseldorf, while the locomotive leads towards Münster. Barrier-free entry and exit is not always possible because some stations have a platform height of only 38 centimetres above the rail.

The Rhein-Haard-Express connects in Munster, Gelsenkirchen, Essen, Duisburg and Düsseldorf with other transport services. In addition, it has direct connections with long-distance rail services in Duisburg and Münster.

Two North Rhine-Westphalian municipal transport associations, the Verkehrsverbund Rhein-Ruhr ("Rhine-Ruhr Transport Association", VRR) and the Zweckverband SPNV Münsterland ("Münsterland rail transport association", ZVM) are involved in the operation of the service. After a call for tenders from European companies to operate the Rhein-Haard-Express and the Haard-Bahn, the contract for operating both lines was awarded in 2001 for the period from 2004 to 2014 to DB Regio NRW.

== See also ==
- List of regional rail lines in North Rhine-Westphalia
- List of scheduled railway routes in Germany
