= Wanne-Eickel–Hamburg railway =

Railway line in Germany

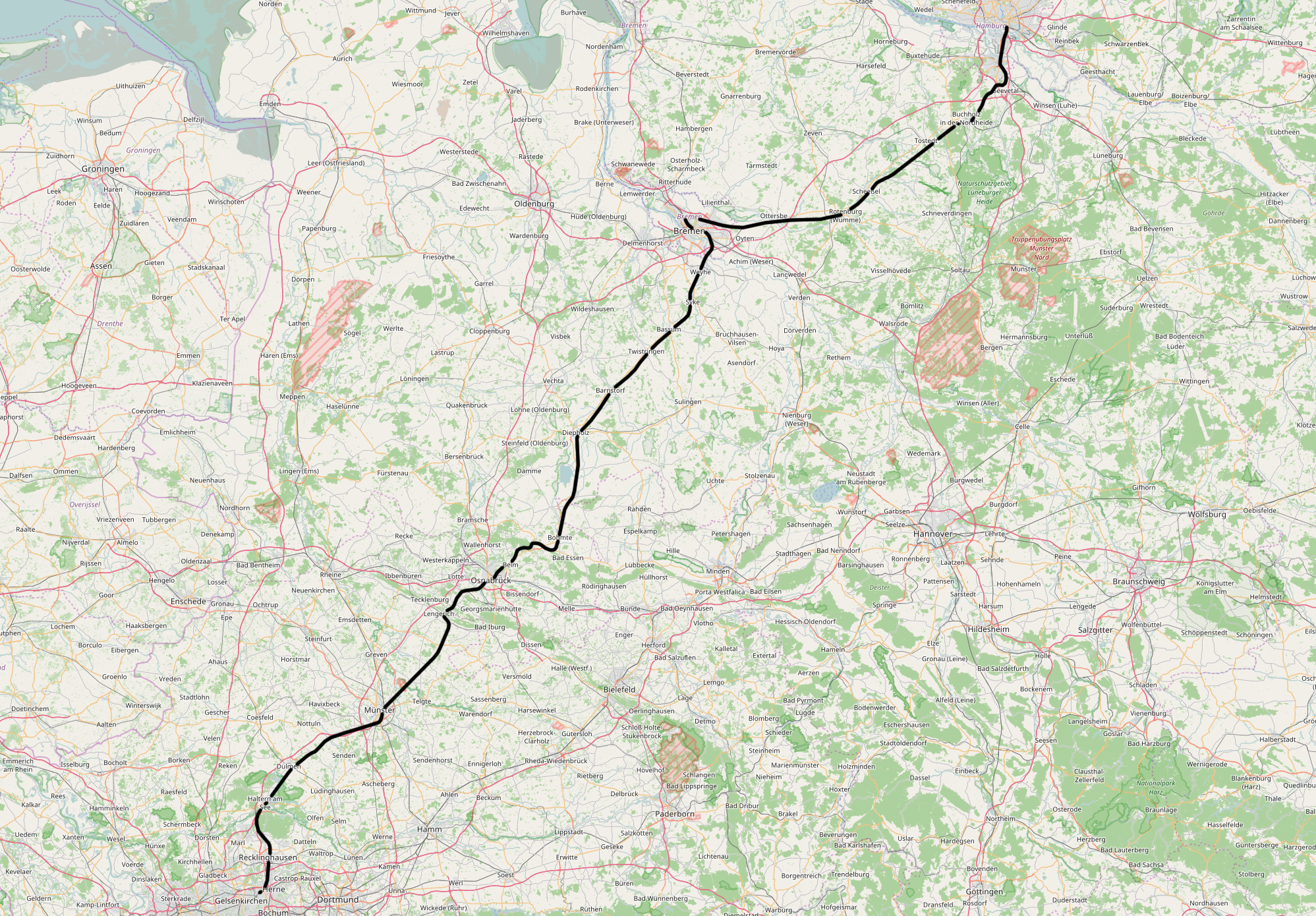

Overview
- Line number: 2200
- Locale: North Rhine-Westphalia, Lower Saxony, Bremen and Hamburg, Germany

Service
- Route number: 425 (Wanne-Eickel–Münster); 385 (Münster–Bremen); 120 (Bremen–Hamburg)

Technical
- Line length: 355 km (221 mi)
- Track gauge: 1,435 mm (4 ft 8 1/2 in) standard gauge
- Electrification: 15 kV/16.7 Hz AC overhead catenary
- Operating speed: 200 km/h (124.3 mph) (maximum)

The Wanne-Eickel–Hamburg railway is the shortest railway link between the Metropole Ruhr and the Hamburg Metropolitan Region and hence one of the most important railway lines in northwest Germany. The Route runs over the cities Münster (Westfalen), Osnabrück and Bremen.

It was built between 1870 and 1874 by the Cologne-Minden Railway Company (CME) based in Wanne-Eickel, and branched off their main (Cologne-)Deutz–Minden route as part of the Hamburg-Venlo railway. Today it is an electrified main line which has a minimum of two tracks throughout. Parts of the route are equipped with Linienzugbeeinflussung train control which enables speeds of up to 200 km/h to be attained.

Due to its constant use by goods and passenger trains rolling along the line, day and night, it has been given the nickname Rollbahn ("Rolling Line").

== History ==
The railway was built by the Cologne-Minden Railway Company (CME) under contract to the Prussian state as the eastern element of a line from Hamburg to Paris (Paris-Hamburg railway). The western terminus of this line was to be the town of Venlo on the Dutch railway network and it therefore went under the name of the Hamburg-Venlo railway.

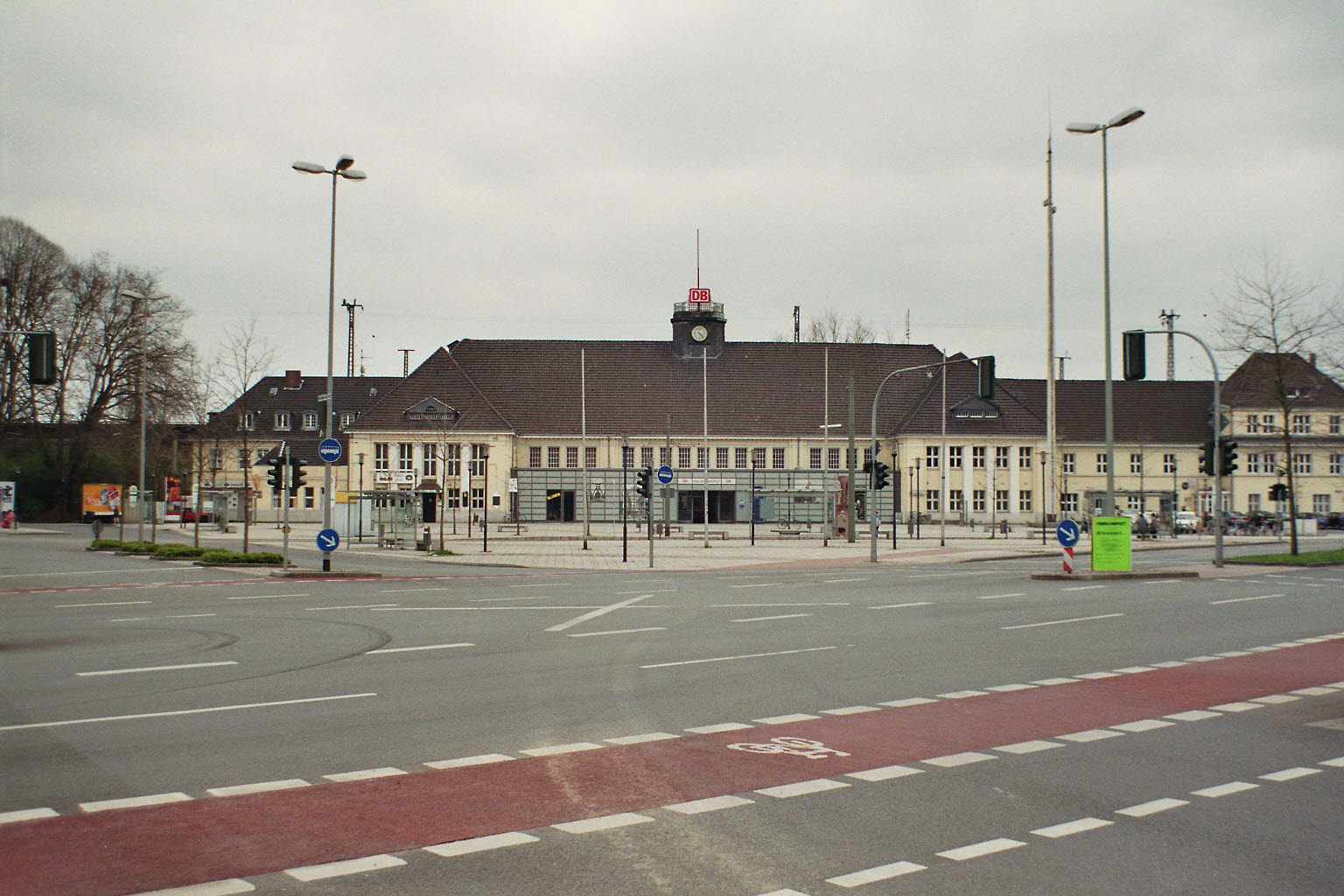
Wanne-Eickel Hbf

In order to form a junction between this line and their existing railway network, the CME extracted a concession from the Prussian state to make Wanne station, a station which lay on the CME's main route from Cologne to Minden, the branch-off point for the line to Hamburg, in order to be able to build the line to Venlo from Haltern about 25 km to the north (see Haltern–Venlo railway).

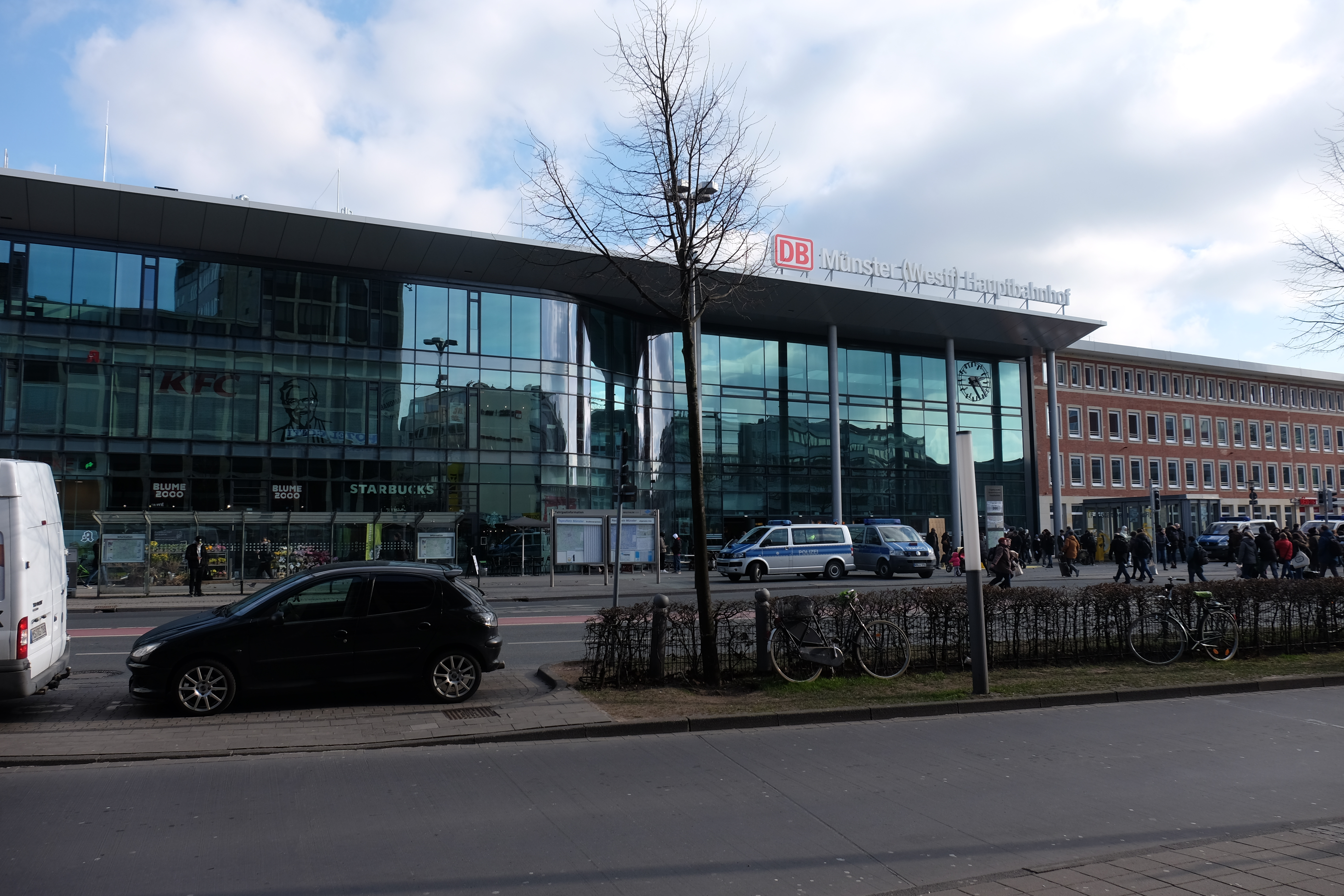
Münster (Westf) Hbf

On 1 January 1870 the first section was opened from Wanne to Münster and on 1 September of the same year its extension to Osnabrück followed. On 1 December 1872 the railway linked Harburg in the Prussian province of Hanover across the Elbe with the Hamburg Hanoverian station in Hamburg.

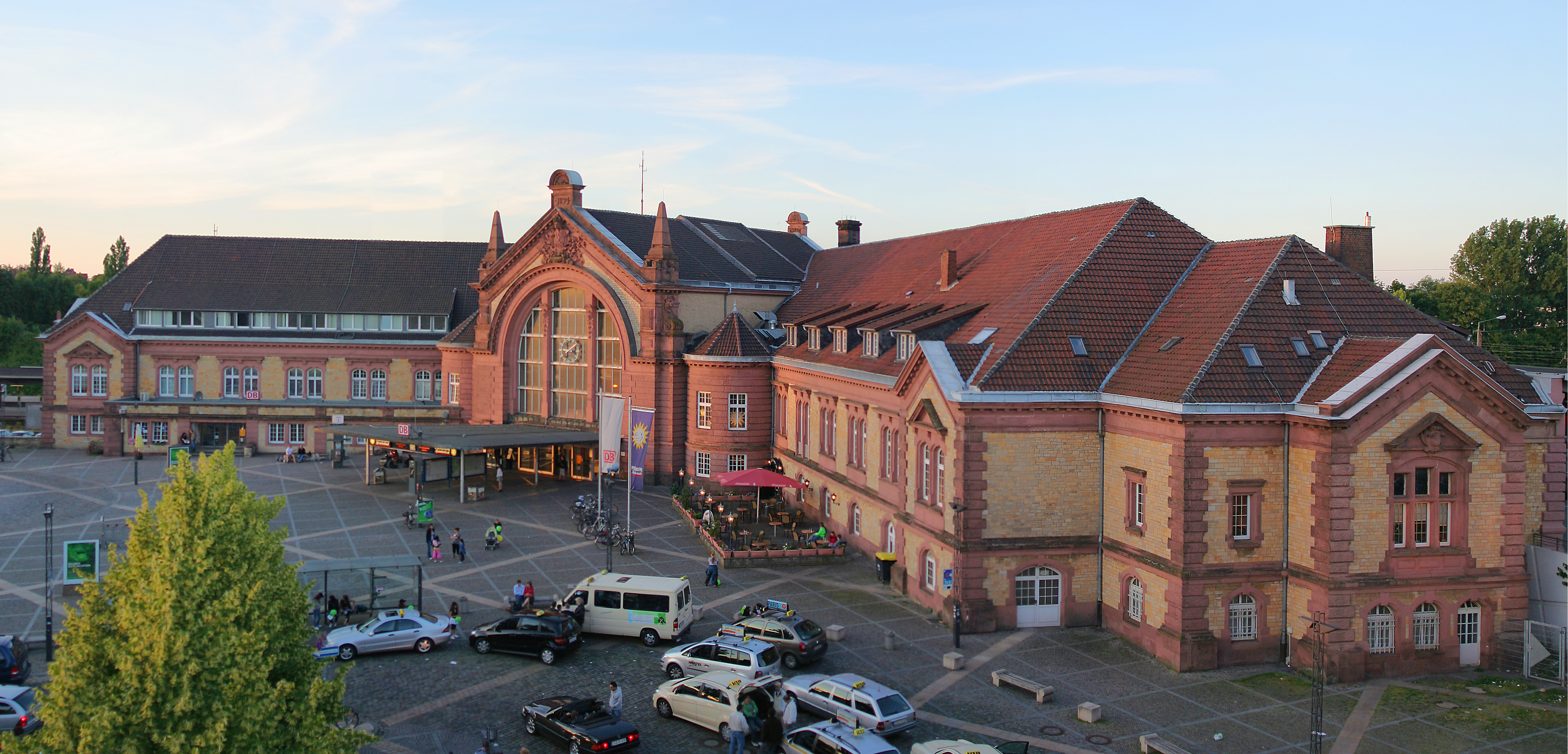
Osnabrück Hbf

The section from Osnabrück to Hemelingen was completed on 15 May 1873 and it had been extended to Bremen by 16 August. The line was finally completed on 1 June 1874 with the opening of the remaining sections between Bremen and Harburg. In 1879 it was nationalised.

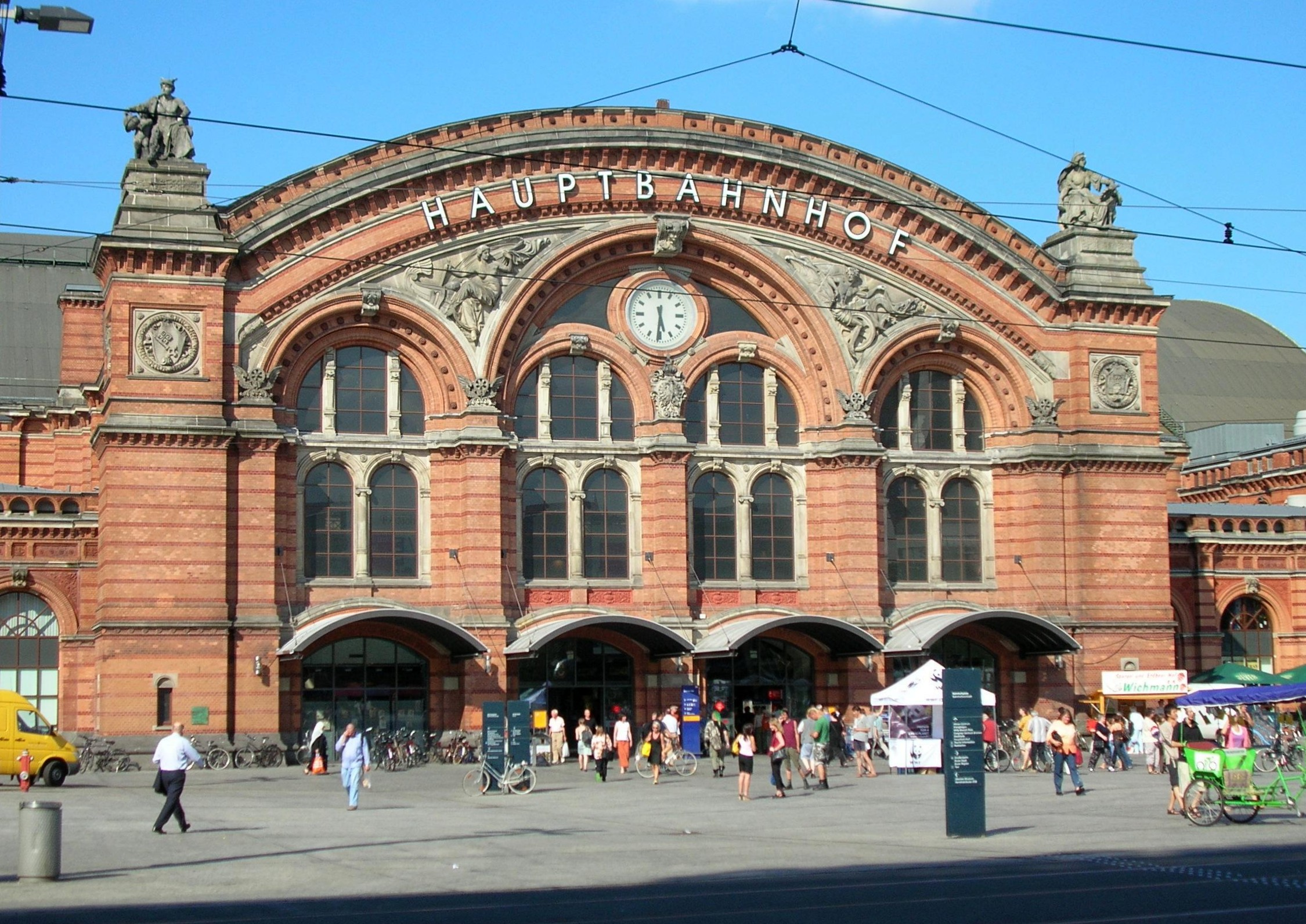
Bremen Hbf

In Bremen the CME initially built a goods station on the site of the present-day town hall, called the Hamburg station. This was provisionally used for passenger services as well, when the old passenger station at Bremen was closed. After the new Bremen Hauptbahnhof had been completed in 1891, the line was moved there and the old station torn down. The line to Hamburg was later used again by the Bremen–Tarmstedt narrow gauge railway and is still recognisable today as the Green Train (Grünzug) park railway between Forther Straße and Innsbrucker Straße.

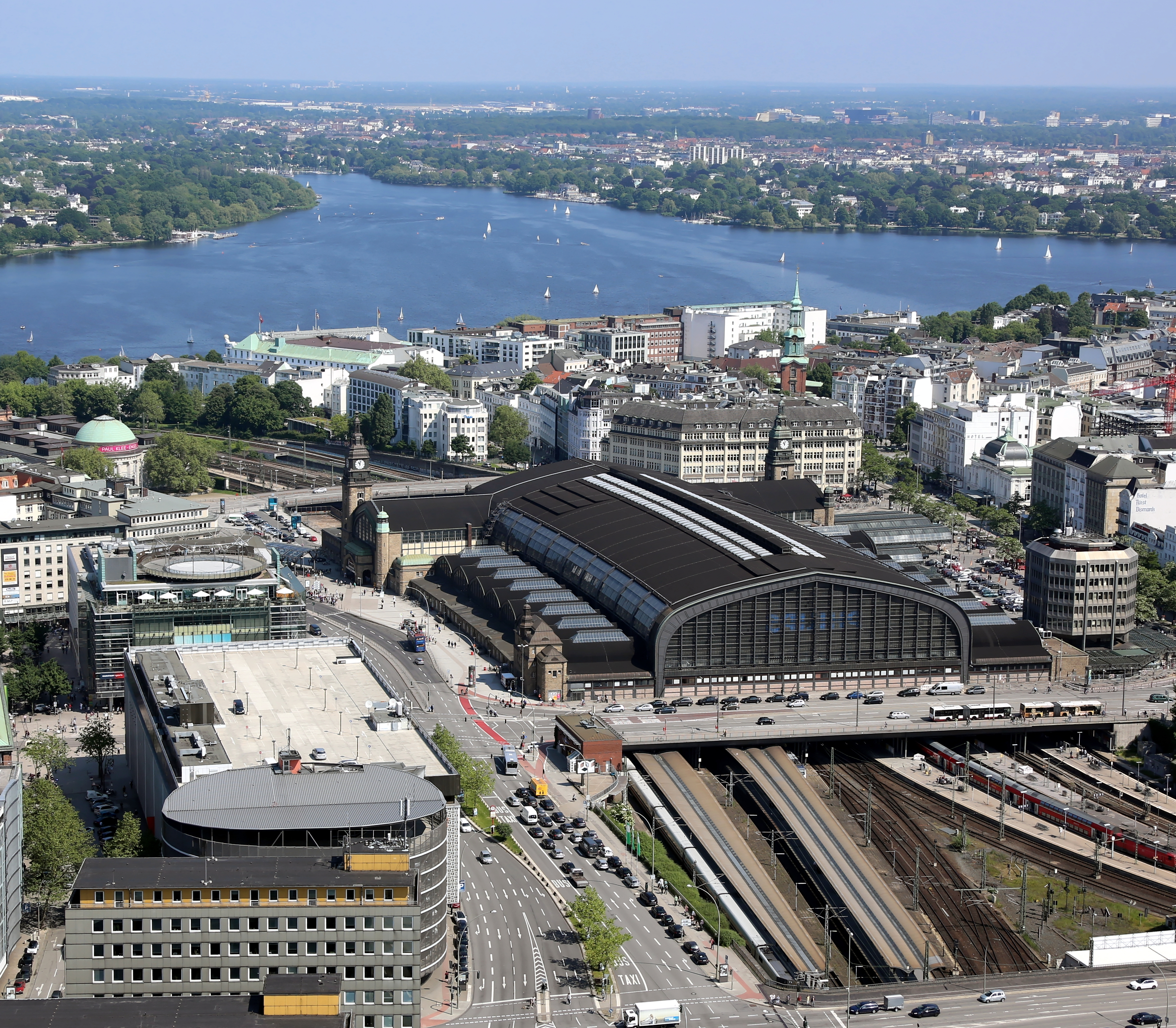
Hamburg Hbf

On 29 September 1907 the Venlo Station in Hamburg was switched from the Hanoverian station to new Hauptbahnhof which had been opened on 6 December 1906 and the halt of Oberhafen was built on the new track next to the old terminus. By 1908 the Wanne–Osnabrück section was given a second track and soon thereafter the rest of the line was also doubled.

Particularly unusual are the multi-level stations in Osnabrück (crossing with the Hanoverian Western Railway) and Dülmen (crossing with the Dortmund–Gronau railway).

=== Planned four-track upgrade ===
After the First World War the Deutsche Reichsbahn planned to upgrade the Münster–Osnabrück line to four tracks. The procurement of land was soon largely complete and work began, not least on building a second tunnel alongside the existing Lengerich (West) Tunnel. The old tunnel was to continue to be used.

The world economic crisis at the start of the 1930s weakened the country and brought the project to a standstill. Because the new Lengerich tunnel was ready and had a better line it was connected to the existing route and taken into service. The old Lengerich tunnel remained out of commission until the Second World War when it was put to use for a while as an underground arms factory. After the war it was returned to civilian use; at one stage being employed as a rifle range for an arms dealer.

Signs of the four-track upgrade can still be seen from immediately north of the tunnel to the area of Hasbergen in the shape of widened embankments and track overbridges. Here the expansion of the line was relatively well advanced.

=== Upgrade in the 20th century ===
In the 1960s the line was electrified.

In 1983 the Hamburg S-Bahn opened its own line between the stations of Hamburg-Harburg and Hamburg Hbf (for routes S3 and S31), that ran between the South and North Elbe parallel to the high-speed line. Its halts at Hamburg-Wilhelmsburg and Hamburg-Veddel were closed as a result.

=== Upgrade into a high-speed railway ===
The first federal transport plan (1973) proposed the upgrade of the Hamburg–Osnabrück–Dortmund line as one of eight major railway projects.

Other parts of the line between Hamburg, Bremen and Münster were taken into service in 1978 as high-speed railways for speeds of up to 200 km/h. On the line between Hamburg and Bremen the section between Sprötze and Lauenbrück (20.1 km) went into service for high-speed services between 1978 and 1984. In 1982 the section between Lauenbrück and Scheeßel was upgraded, and between 1983/84 and 1986 the section between Scheeßel and Utbremen (40.1 km) followed suit (the last 9.7 km finally being completed in 1990). On the line between Bremen and Münster the section between Dreye and Kirchweyhe (4.0 km) was upgraded in 1983 for high-speed services. In 1984/85 most of the (67.3 km) sections between Bramstedt and Bohmte followed, and the remaining (3.2 km) stretch was done in 1986.

The expansion of the 287 km long line between Münster and Hamburg, consisting of 195 individual measures, cost 550 million deutschmarks (at 1991 prices). This included the new triple-tracked section between Bremen and Hamburg.

=== Triple-track upgrade ===
In June 1986 a third track between Buchholz (branching to the Maschen Marshalling Yard) and Rotenburg went into service, in order to be able to better handle goods and passenger traffic alongside one another. In fact, in connexion with that the Rotenburg-Verden and Nienburg-Minden lines were to be doubled in order that goods traffic could be diverted from the Ruhrgebiet-Bremen section onto the four-track Hamm-Minden line. These plans have however had to take a back seat.

=== Bremen Freight Bypass and Mahndorf Curve ===
When the Hamburg-Venlo railway was built, the Hanseatic city of Bremen (like Hamburg) was still not a member of the German Customs Union (Zollverein); in fact this did not happen until 1888.

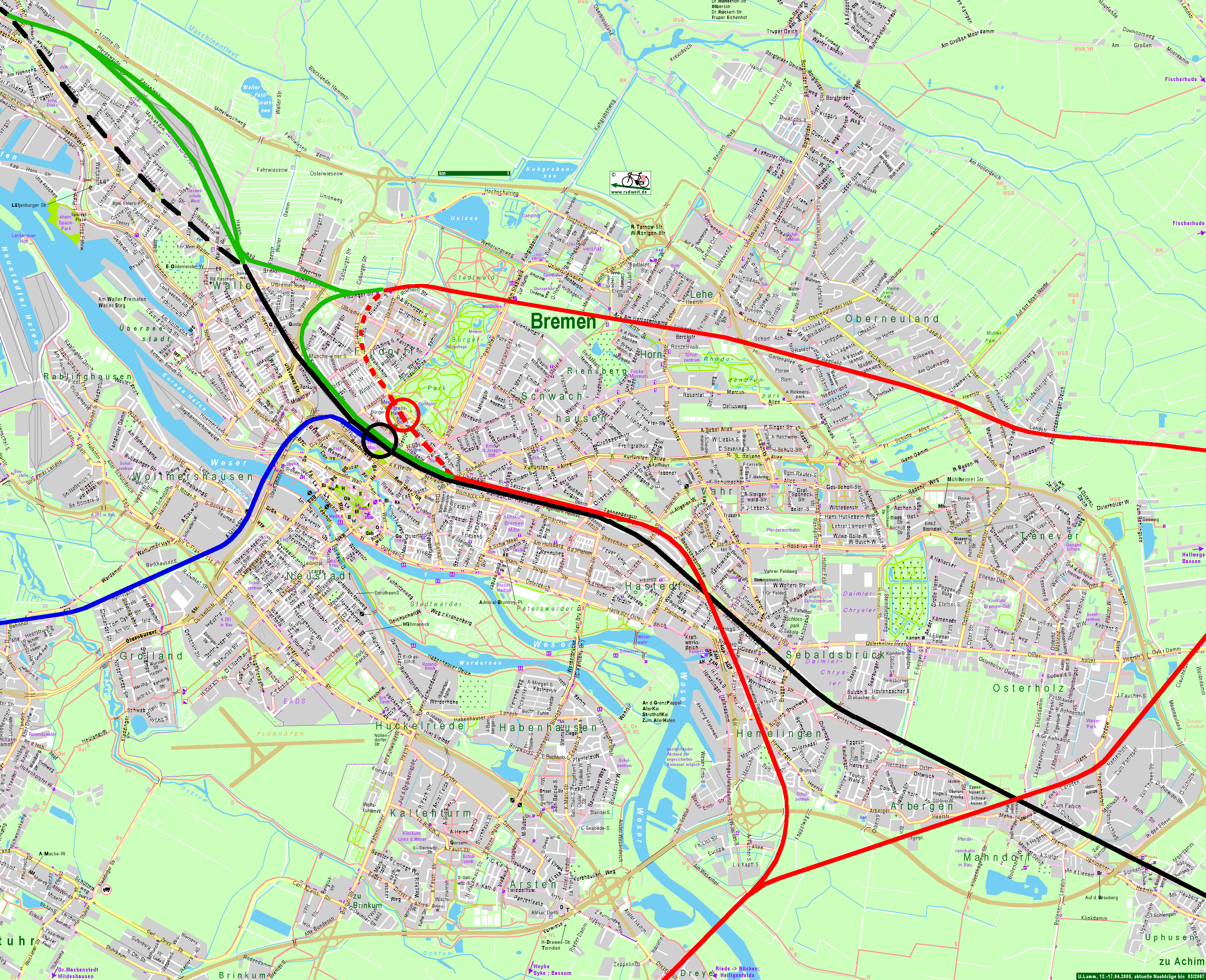
Development of Bremen network: Hamburg-Venlo railway: red Lines built in 1880: green Dismantled lines: dashed

In order to be able to transport goods from the Rhenish-Westphalian industrial region to Harburg without incurring taxes in the German customs area a treaty-approved goods line was built due east past Bremen which also reduced the journey time considerably because it was almost 13 km shorter than the main route which ran in a loop through Bremen state territory.

At one time a link was planned from the Sagehorn–Dreye goods line to the Hanover–Bremen railway as part of the S-Bahn concept for Bremen, which would have enabled a through S-Bahn line from Nordenham to Rotenburg (Wümme). The project foundered due to its high cost. At the crossing an IC crossing station, Bremen-Mahndorf, had also been planned. The shortcut was worked for several years by the Hamburg–Cologne Metropolitan line. Currently an ICE Sprinter pair of trains uses the line to circumvent Bremen Hbf. Tracks pass over the Friedenstunnel in Bremen.

== Operations ==
The railway is the backbone of rail passenger services between the Ruhr and Hamburg with at least one Intercity pair of trains running per hour. The majority of these trains only run from Münster to Hamburg over the historical route (timetable routes 120 Hamburg–Bremen and 385 Bremen–Münster). By contrast, between Dortmund and Münster they initially use the Dortmund–Gronau railway and then the single-tracked Preußen–Münster railway. Additional long-distance trains usually run over a detour via the Dortmund–Hamm railway and Hamm–Münster railway. ICE-Sprinters (and also the former Metropolitan) trains run past Bremen directly to Hamburg in order to save time by using the goods route.

The southern section of the Münster–Wanne-Eickel line (route no. 425) is also regularly used by passenger services, especially the two-hourly IC trains from Norddeich Mole via Münster, Wanne-Eickel, Duisburg, Cologne and Koblenz to Luxemburg.

=== Local services ===
In the conurbations of Rhein-Ruhr, Bremen and Hamburg regional trains also run on this railway. A short section between the stations of Recklinghausen Süd and Recklinghausen Hauptbahnhof is also worked by some trains of the Rhine-Ruhr S-Bahn (route S2). Between Münster and Osnabrück the Regionalbahn service RB 66 (Teuto-Bahn) is operated hourly by WestfalenBahn. Between Bremen and Hamburg services are operated an hour by metronom.

New S-Bahn Line S 9 Rhine-Ruhr S-Bahn 11. September 2020 Recklinghausen Hauptbahnhof via Gladbeck, Bottrop, Essen, Wuppertal to Hagen. Connecting route 2223 from Abzwg Blumenthal.

== See also ==
- List of scheduled railway routes in Germany

== Literature ==
- Deutsche Reichsbahn, Horst-Werner Dumjahn: Die deutschen Eisenbahnen in ihrer Entwicklung 1835–1935. Reichsdruckerei, Berlin 1935, Nachdruck with Vorwort von Horst-Werner Dumjahn: Dumjahn Verlag, Mainz 1984, ISBN 3-921426-29-4
- Detlev Höhn: Am Knick der Rollbahn. Eisenbahnen in Lengerich. Eisenbahn-Geschichte No. 30, p. 4–13. ISSN 1611-6283
