= Dortmund-Derne station =

Railway station in Dortmund, Germany

Dortmund Derne
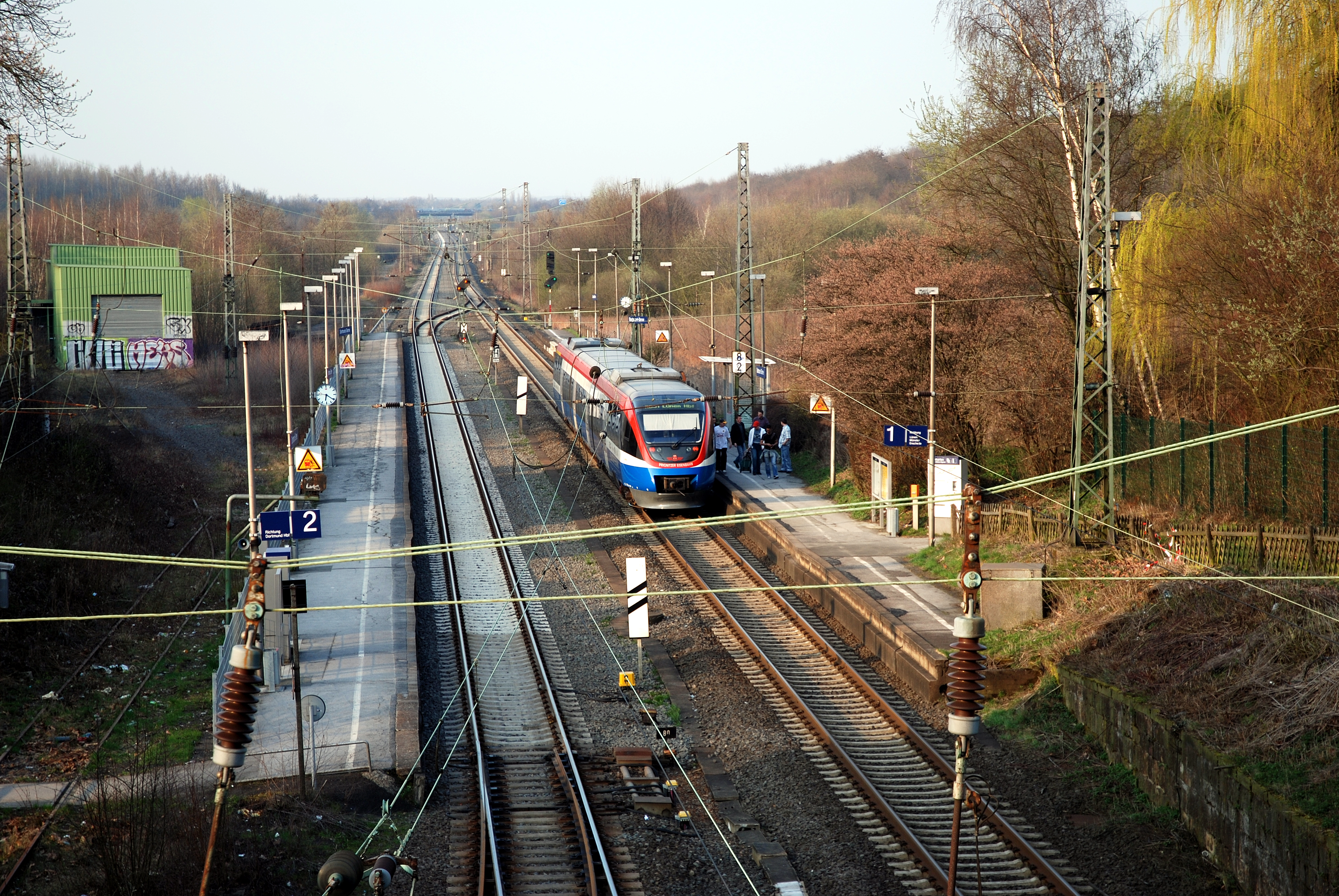
- 2007

General information
- Location: Hostedder Straße/Molkenstraße; 44329 Dortmund; NRW, Germany
- Coordinates: 51.5682°N 7.5291°E
- Owner: DB Netz
- Operator: DB Station&Service
- Line: Dortmund–Gronau railway
- Platforms: 2 side platforms
- Tracks: 2
- Train operators: DB Regio NRW eurobahn

Construction
- Accessible: Yes

Other information
- Station code: 1303
- DS100 code: EDD
- IBNR: 8001530
- Category: 6
- Fare zone: VRR: 382
- Website: www.bahnhof.de

History
- Opened: 1874; 152 years ago

Services
Preceding station	DB Regio NRW	Following station
Preußen towards Enschede	RB 51	Dortmund-Kirchderne towards Dortmund Hbf
Preceding station		Following station
Preußen towards Münster Hbf	RB 50	Dortmund-Kirchderne towards Dortmund Hbf
Location
- Location within North Rhine-Westphalia

Dortmund-Derne station is a railway station in the Derne district of the town of Dortmund, located in North Rhine-Westphalia, Germany.

== Rail services ==
Line	Name	Route
RB 50	Der Lüner	Dortmund Hauptbahnhof – Dortmund-Derne – Lünen Hauptbahnhof – Münster Hauptbahnhof
RB 51	Westmünsterland-Bahn	Dortmund Hauptbahnhof – Dortmund-Derne – Lünen Hauptbahnhof – Coesfeld (Westf) – Gronau (Westf) – Enschede
