= Dortmund-Kirchderne station =

Railway station in Dortmund, Germany

Dortmund Kirchderne
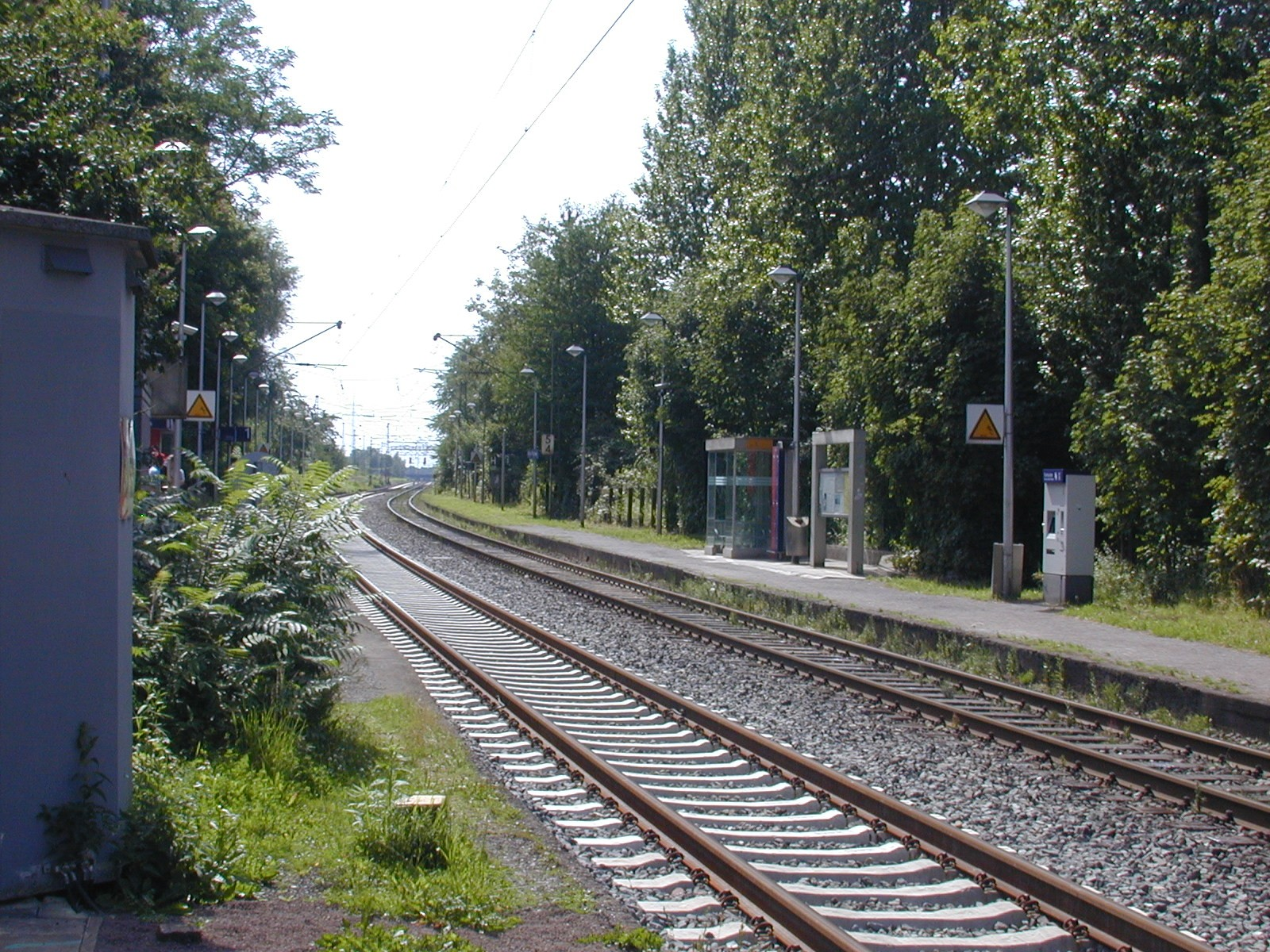
- 2007

General information
- Location: Im Karrenberg 2; 44329 Dortmund; NRW, Germany
- Coordinates: 51°32′49″N 7°30′37″E
- Owner: DB Netz
- Operator: DB Station&Service
- Line: Dortmund–Gronau railway
- Platforms: 2 side platforms
- Tracks: 2
- Train operators: DB Regio NRW eurobahn

Construction
- Accessible: Yes

Other information
- Station code: 1309
- DS100 code: EDKD
- IBNR: 8001533
- Category: 6
- Fare zone: VRR: 382
- Website: www.bahnhof.de

Services
Preceding station	DB Regio NRW	Following station
Dortmund-Derne towards Enschede	RB 51	Dortmund Hbf Terminus
Preceding station		Following station
Dortmund-Derne towards Münster Hbf	RB 50	Dortmund Hbf Terminus
Location
- Location within North Rhine-Westphalia

Dortmund-Kirchderne station is a railway station in the Kirchderne district of the town of Dortmund, located in North Rhine-Westphalia, Germany.

== Rail services ==
Line	Name	Route
RB 50	Der Lüner	Dortmund Hauptbahnhof – Dortmund-Kirchderne – Lünen Hauptbahnhof – Münster Hauptbahnhof
RB 51	Westmünsterland-Bahn	Dortmund Hauptbahnhof – Dortmund-Kirchderne – Lünen Hauptbahnhof – Coesfeld (Westf) – Gronau (Westf) – Enschede
