= Wernekinck =

Wernekinck is a surname. Notable people with the surname include:

- Franz Wernekinck (1764–1839), German physician and botanist
- Friedrich Christian Gregor Wernekinck (1789–1835), German anatomist, son of Franz
