= Lette (Kr Coesfeld) station =

Railway station in Coesfeld, Germany

Lette (Kr Coesfeld)
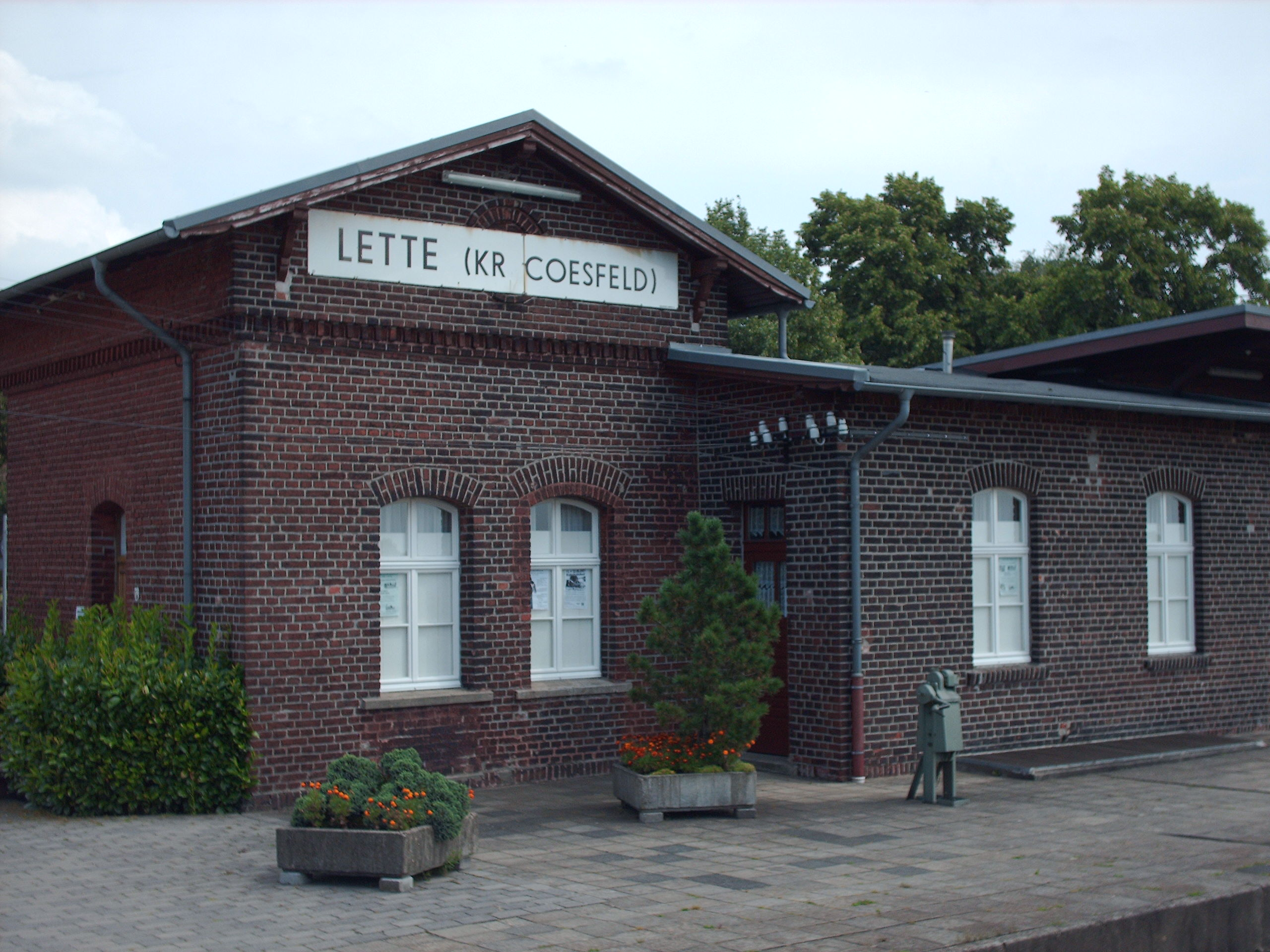
- Lette railway station in 2007

General information
- Location: Lette, NRW, Germany
- Coordinates: 51°53′32″N 7°11′13″E
- Line: Dortmund–Gronau railway

Construction
- Accessible: Yes

Other information
- Fare zone: Westfalentarif: 55624
- Website: www.bahnhof.de

Services
Preceding station	DB Regio NRW	Following station
Coesfeld towards Enschede	RB 51	Dülmen towards Dortmund Hbf
Location

Lette (Kr Coesfeld) (German: Bahnhof Lette (Kr Coesfeld)) is a railway station in the town of Lette, North Rhine-Westphalia, Germany. The station lies on the Dortmund–Gronau railway and the train services are operated by Deutsche Bahn.

== Train services ==
The station is served by the following services:

- Local service RB 51 Enschede - Gronau - Coesfeld - Lünen - Dortmund
