= Ahaus station =

Railway station in Ahaus, Germany

Ahaus
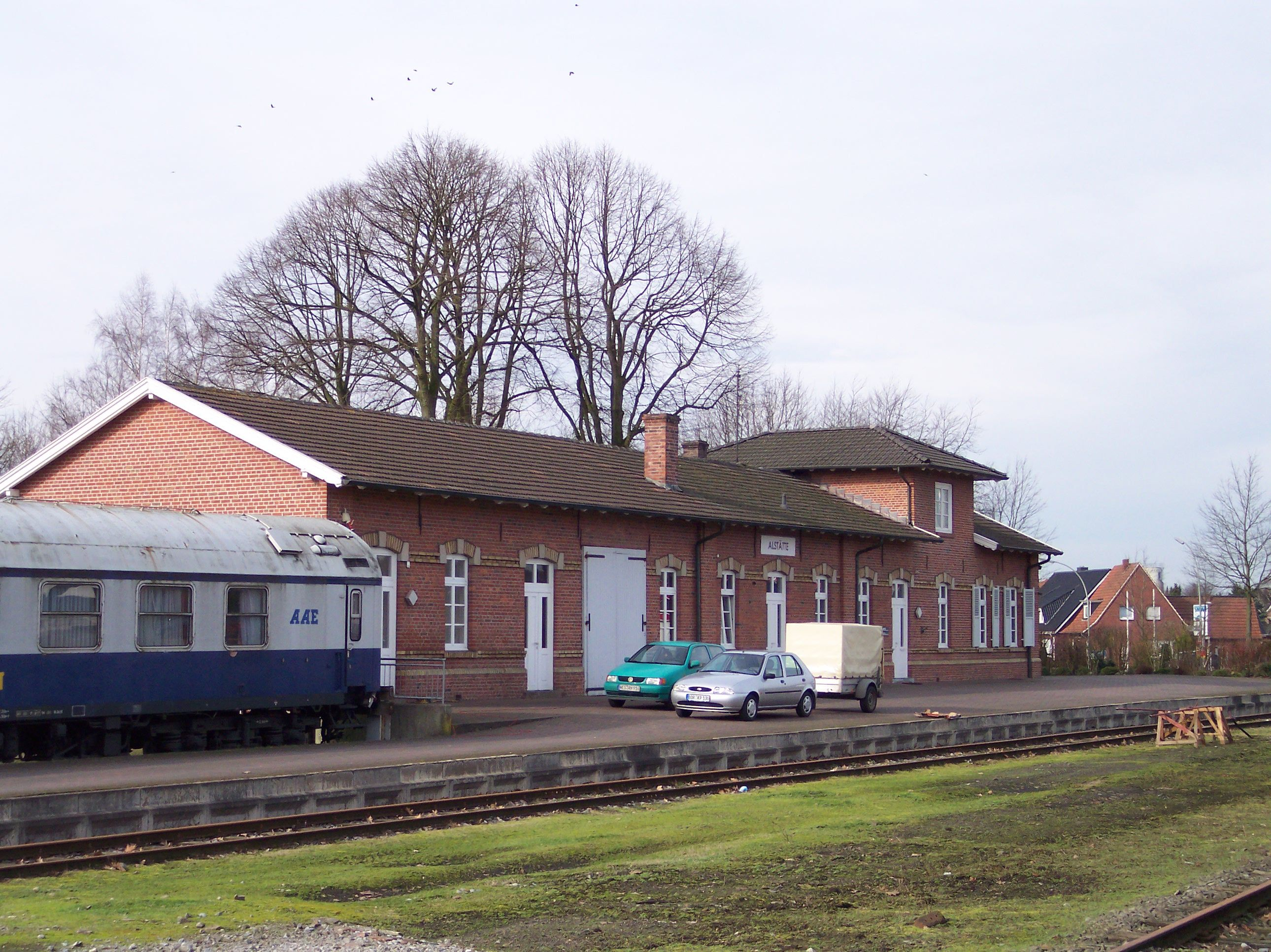
- Ahaus railway station

General information
- Location: Ahaus, NRW, Germany
- Coordinates: 52°04′55″N 7°00′59″E
- Line: Dortmund–Gronau railway
- Platforms: 2
- Tracks: 2

Construction
- Accessible: Yes

Other information
- Fare zone: Westfalentarif: 57841
- Website: www.bahnhof.de

Services
| Preceding station | DB Regio NRW | Following station |
|---|---|---|
| Epe (Westf) towards Enschede | RB 51 | Legden towards Dortmund Hbf |
Location

Ahaus (In German: Bahnhof Ahaus) is a railway station in the town of Ahaus, North Rhine-Westphalia, Germany. The station is located on the Dortmund–Gronau railway, and its train services are operated by Deutsche Bahn.

== Train services ==
The station is served by the following services:

- Local service RB 51 Enschede - Gronau - Coesfeld - Lünen - Dortmund

== Fare association ==
Westfalen-Tarif

The station is located in the fare associatiom Westfalen-Tarif.

== Gallery ==
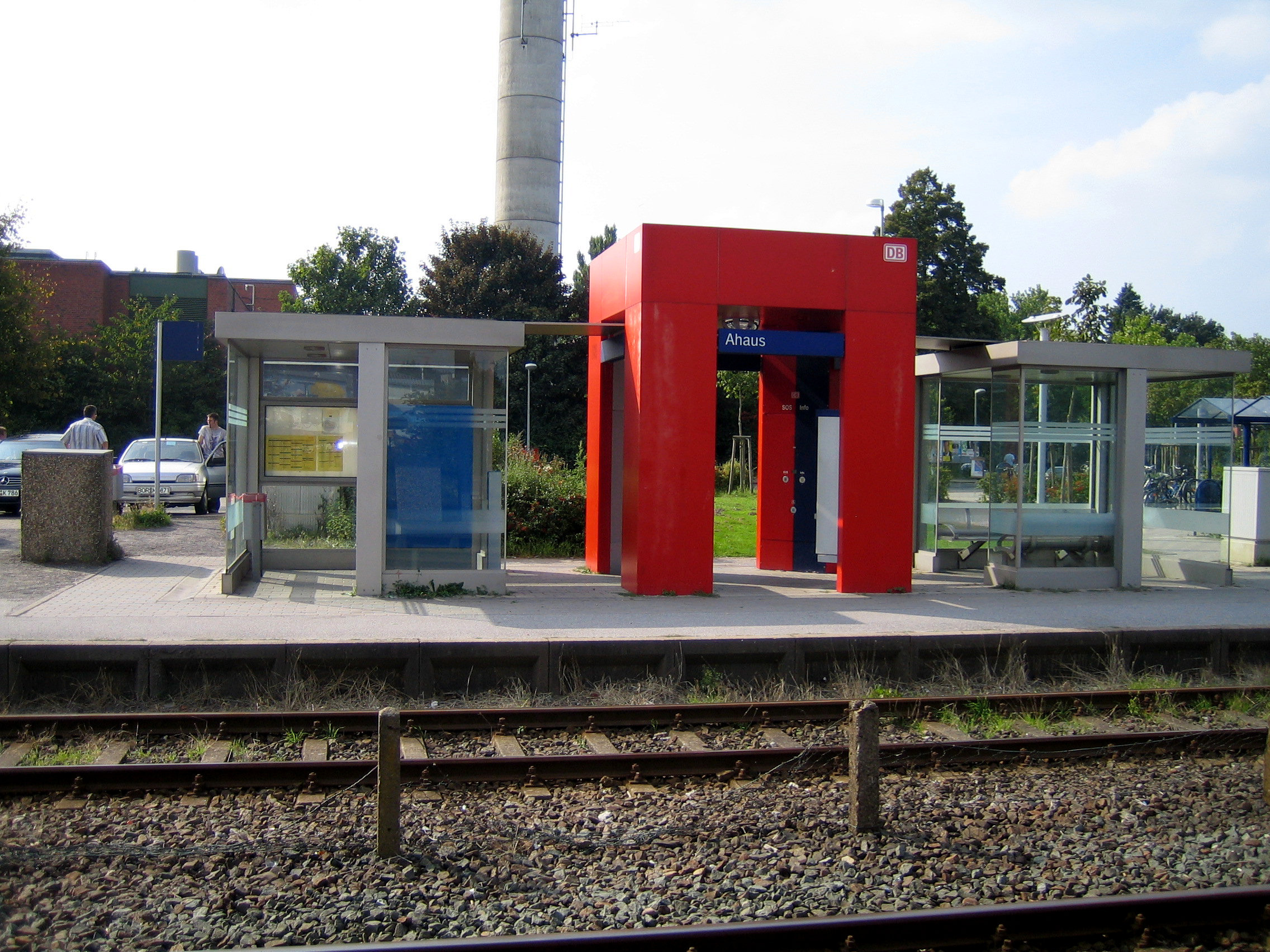
1

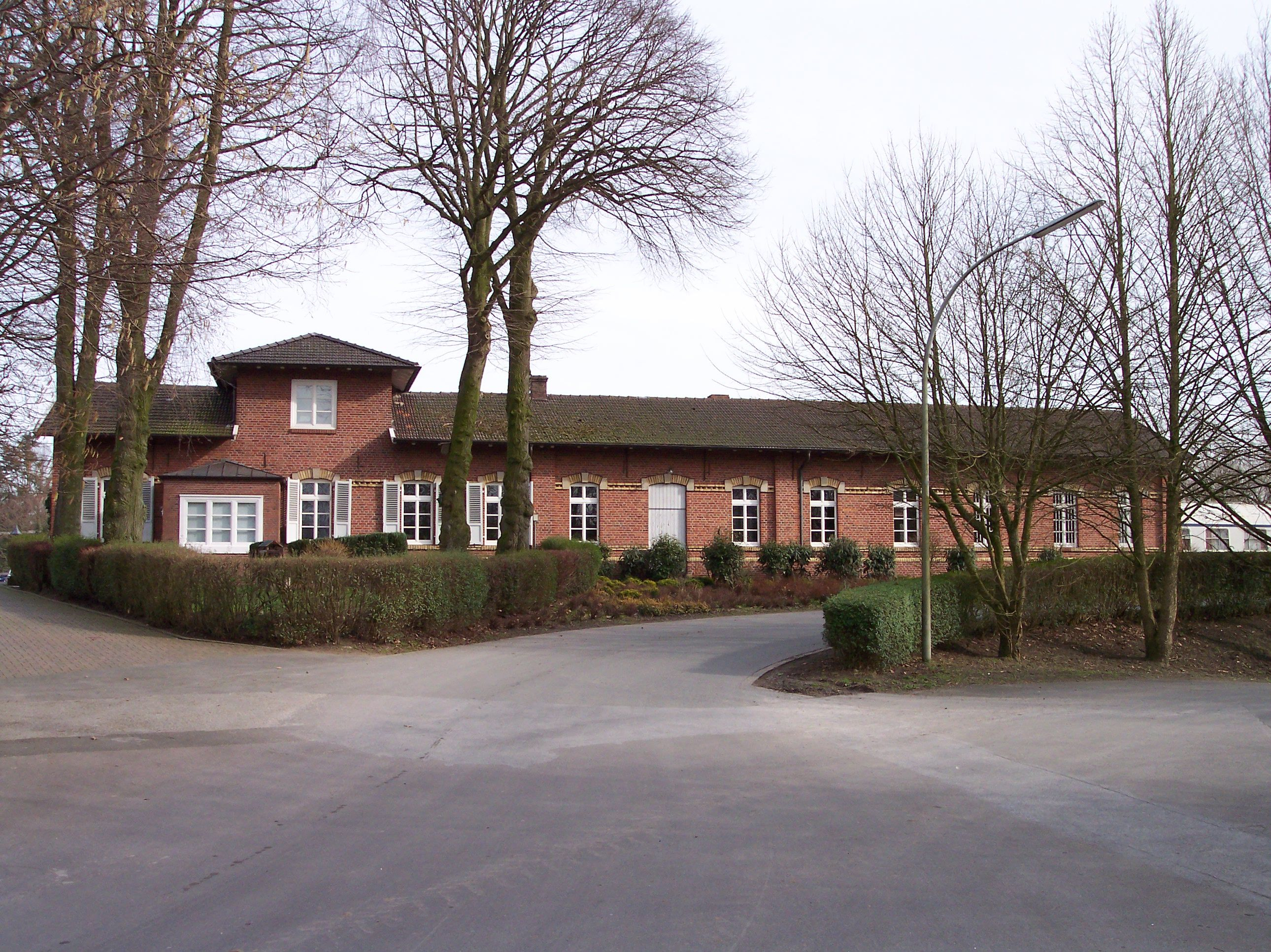
2

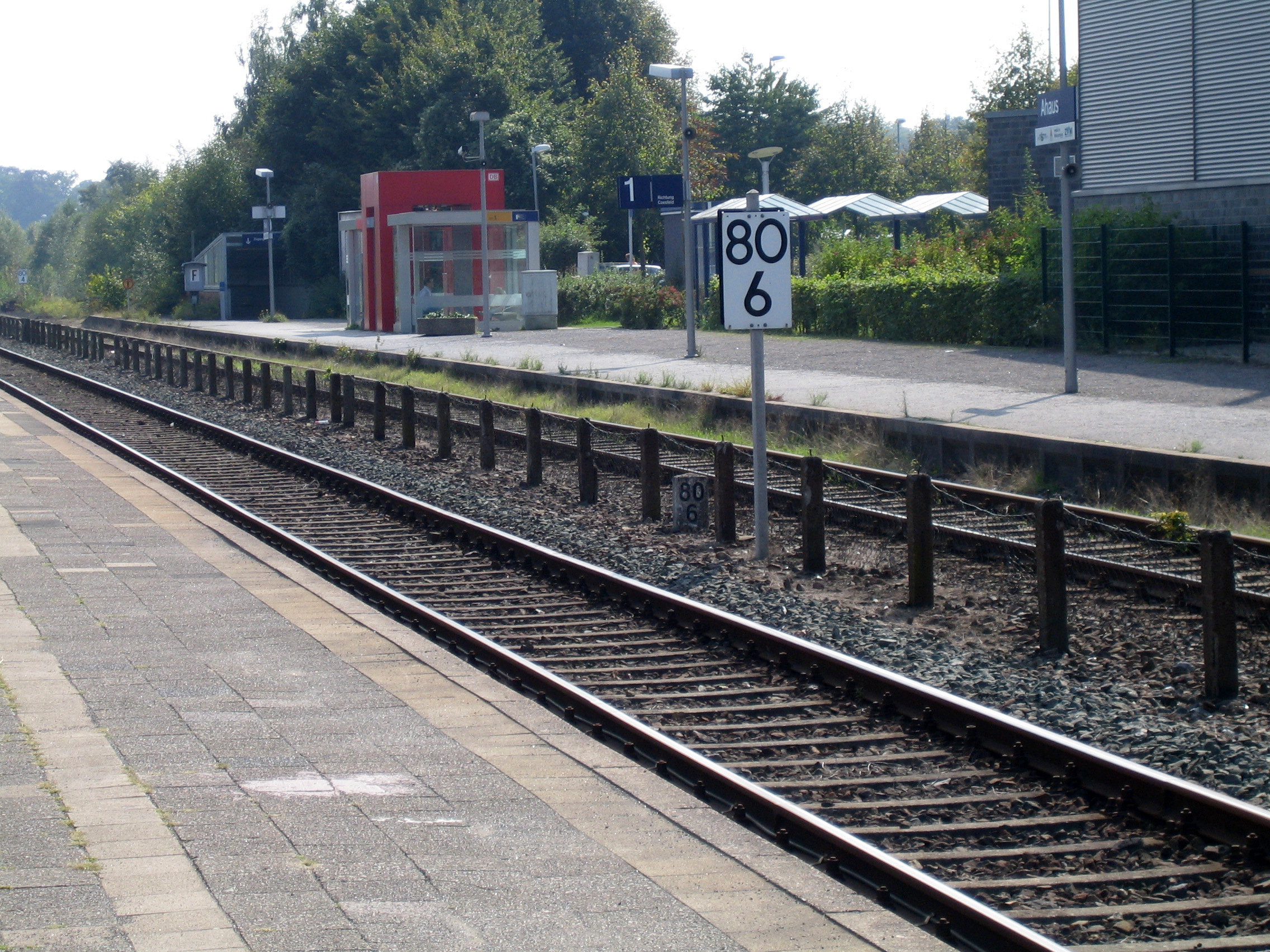
3

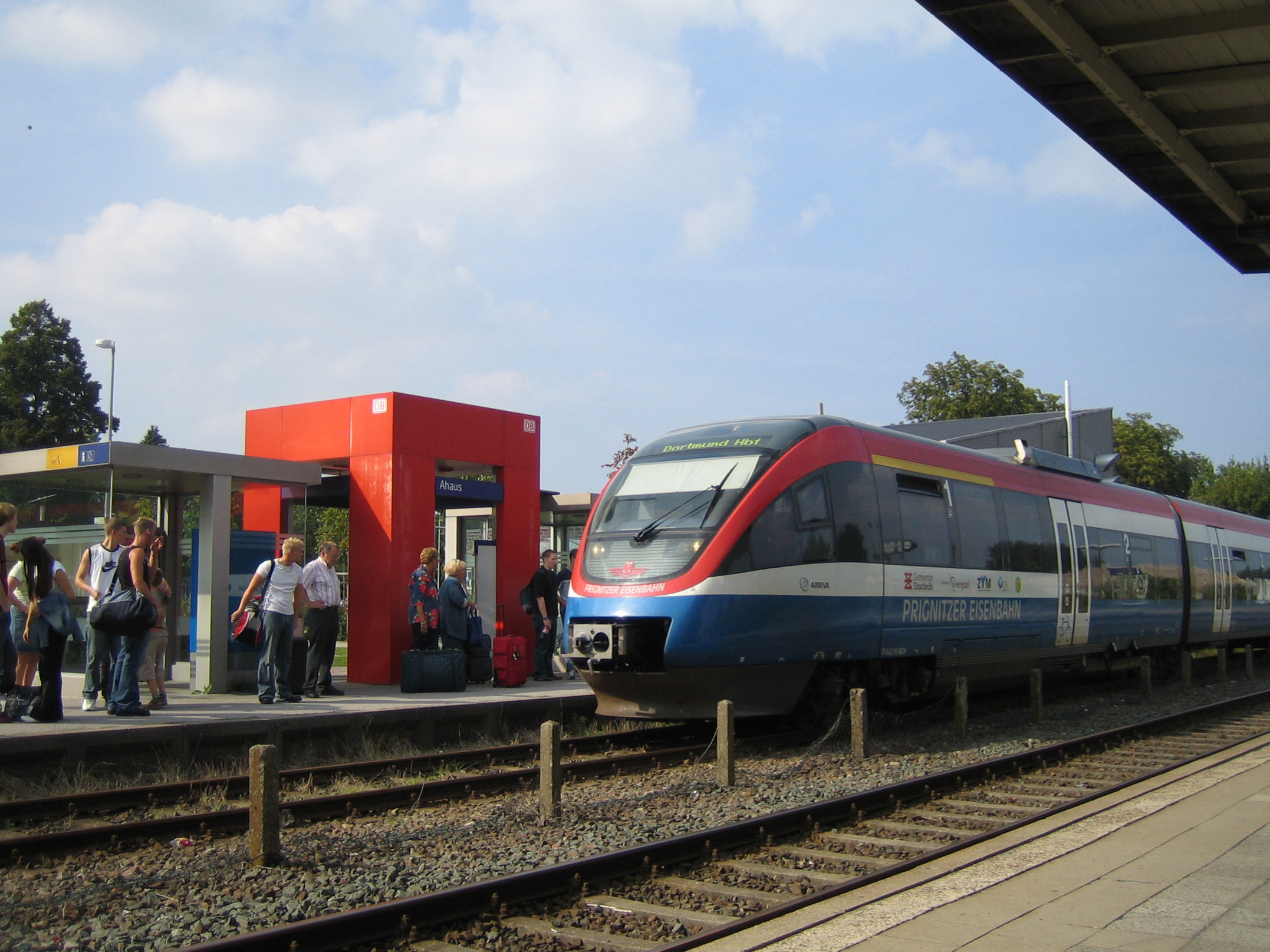
4
