= J. Monika Walther =

German writer

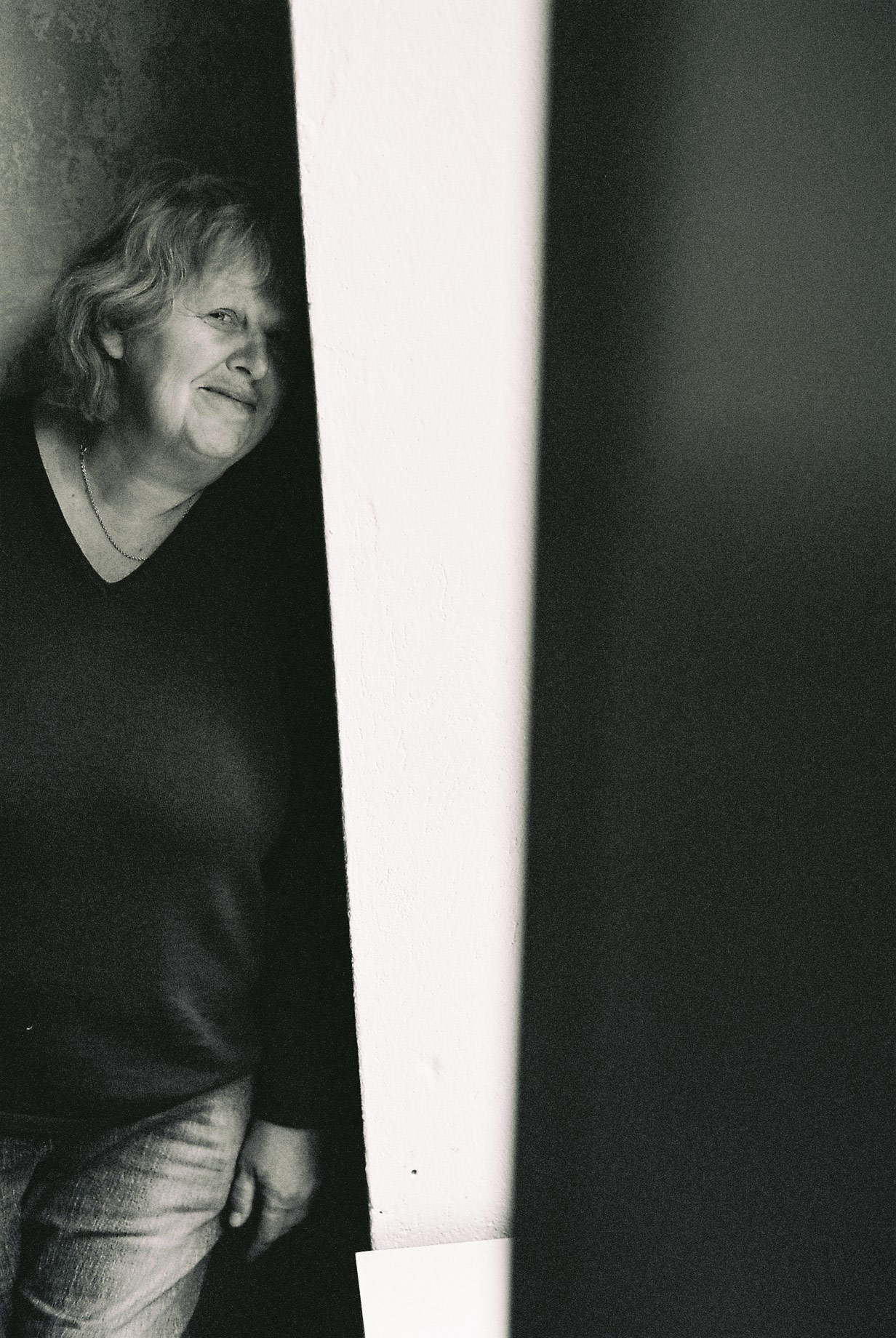
- Born: August 7, 1945 (age 79); Leipzig, Germany

J. Monika Walther (born August 7, 1945, in Leipzig) is a German writer.

== Life ==
J. Monika Walther comes from a Jewish-German family. She grew up in Leipzig, Berlin and several southern German cities. After a diploma in history and education and a master's degree in psychology, she completed her doctorate with a thesis in journalism. She has spent extended periods abroad in Spain, Portugal and Israel.

Since 1966, J. Monika Walther has lived in Dülmen-Hiddingsel (Münsterland) and the Netherlands. She has been working as a writer in the fields of poetry, prose, and radio plays since 1976. She has written over 80 radio plays, audio books, audio collages and artistic features. She has received numerous prizes and scholarships.

J. Monika Walther is a lecturer in media education at Heinrich Heine University in Düsseldorf.

She is a member of the VS Verband Deutscher Schriftstellerinnen und Schriftsteller and the Autorinnenvereinigung e.V.

== Works (selection) ==
- with Jörg Burkhard, Harry Oberländer: Ein paar Dinge von denen ich weiß. Kramer, Berlin 1977, ISBN 3-87956-058-7.
- Querfeldein. Poems. Vechta 2005, ISBN 3-937844-83-X.
- Die neuen Kriege. Feature. Cologne 2005.
- Schafszorn. Radio play. Cologne 2004.
- Wir werden wie die Träumenden sein – Eine Landsuche in Deutschland. Stories. Leipzig 2002, ISBN 3-00-009161-0.
- Katzenschießen. Radio play. Hamburg/Cologne/Berlin 1998.
- Metula-Lebenszeichen aus der letzten Welt. Radio play. Cologne/London, Almelo 1994 and 1995.
- Goldbroiler oder die Beschreibung einer Schlacht. Radio play. Hamburg/Leipzig 1995.
- In der Traumwäscherei ist Arbeit. Poems. Frankfurt 1990, ISBN 3-88633-047-8.
- Fluchtlinien. Radio play. Berlin 1988.
- Die Traurigkeit nach dem Singen. Novel. 1981, ISBN 3-88633-010-9.
- Verlorene Träume – Geschichten nach dem Hochzeitslied. Munich 1978–1984, ISBN 3-921040-85-X, ISBN 3-423-06348-3.
- Das Gewicht der Seele. Short stories. Edited by Iris Nölle-Hornkamp. Paderborn 2009, ISBN 978-3-89785-696-7.
- Goldbroiler oder die Beschreibung einer Schlacht. Novel. Vechta 2009, ISBN 978-3-86685-208-2.
- Windblüten Maschendraht. Poems. Nottbeck 2012, ISBN 978-3-943270-02-0.
- Sperlingssommer. Short stories. Vechta 2012, ISBN 978-3-86685-351-5.
- Himmel und Erde. Novel. Stuttgart 2014, ISBN 978-3-945195-19-2.
- Und alles lebt, was einst mit mir hier lebte. Westphalian homeland – Jewish neighbors. Audiobook, 2 CDs. 2014, ISBN 978-3-939974-37-6.
- Abrisse im Viertel. Poems 2010–2015. Photographs by Henning Berkefeld. Geest, Vechta-Langförden 2015, ISBN 978-3-86685-516-8.
- Am Weltenrand. Prose. With photographs by Henning Berkefeld. Vechta 2017, ISBN 978-3-86685-606-6
- Als Queen Elizabeth II. Schnaps im Hafen von Marne trank. Vechta 2019
- Dorf – Milch und Honig sind fort. 2020. Vechta 2020. ISBN 978 3 86685 760 5
- Der Mann ohne Hände, crime novel, together with Monika Detering. Vechta 2020
- Nachtzüge – Gedichte und gefundene Zettel. Vechta 2021
- Lesebuch Jay Monika Walther. Nylands Kleine Westfälische Bibliothek, edited by Iris Nölle-Hornkamp. Bielefeld 2022. ISBN 978-3-8498-1823-4
