= Legden station =

Railway station in Legden, Germany

Legden
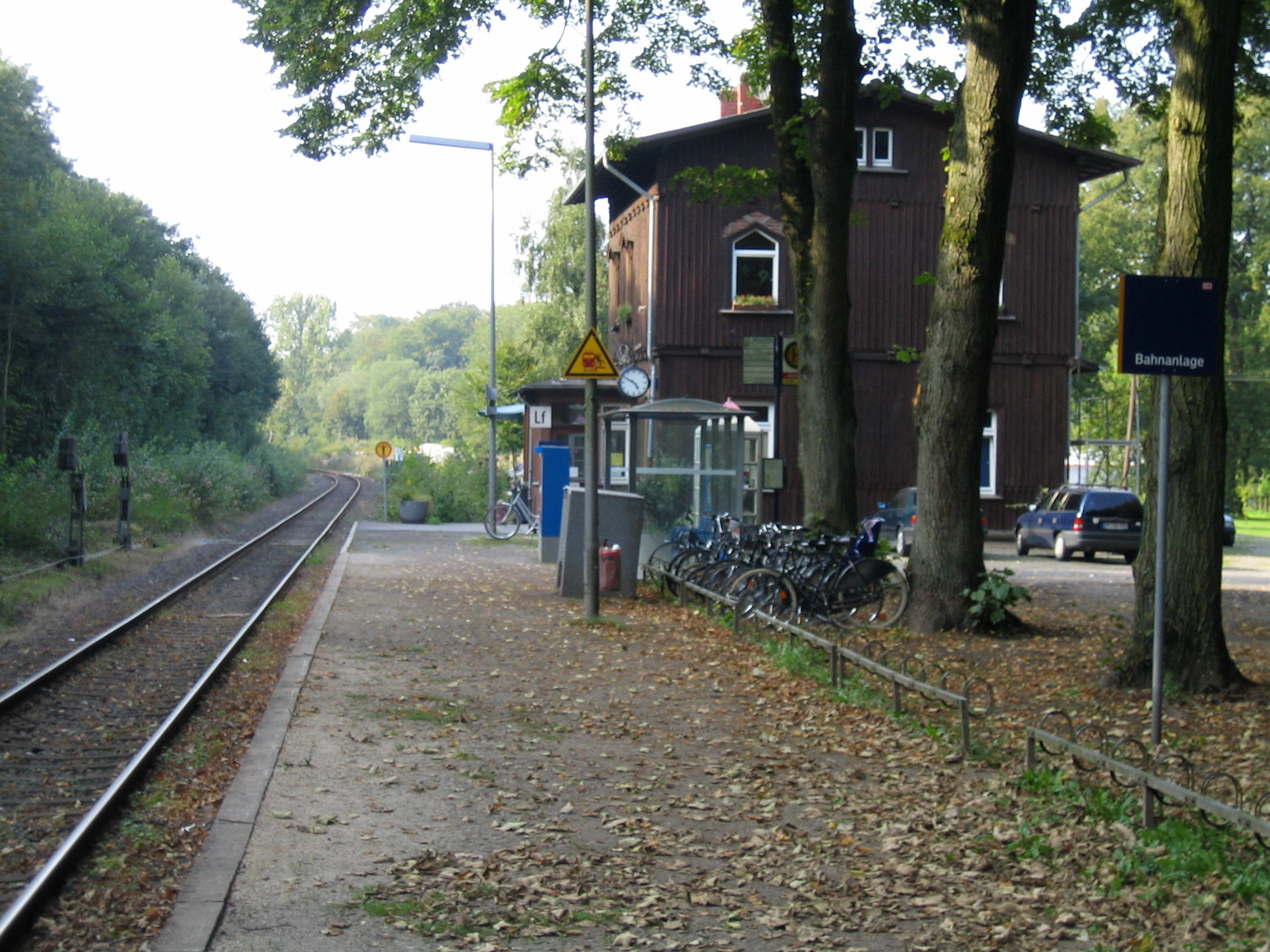
- Legden railway station

General information
- Location: Legden, NRW, Germany
- Coordinates: 52°02′05″N 7°05′20″E
- Line: Dortmund–Gronau railway
- Platforms: 1
- Tracks: 1

Construction
- Accessible: Yes

Other information
- Fare zone: Westfalentarif: 57881
- Website: www.bahnhof.de

Services
Preceding station	DB Regio NRW	Following station
Ahaus towards Enschede	RB 51	Rosendahl-Holtwick towards Dortmund Hbf
Location

Legden (German: Bahnhof Legden) is a railway station in the town of Legden, North Rhine-Westphalia, Germany. The station lies on the Dortmund–Gronau railway and the train services are operated by Deutsche Bahn.

== Train services ==
The station is served by the following services:

- Local service RB 51 Enschede - Gronau - Coesfeld - Lünen - Dortmund
