= Epe (Westf) station =

Railway station in Epe, Germany

Epe (Westf)
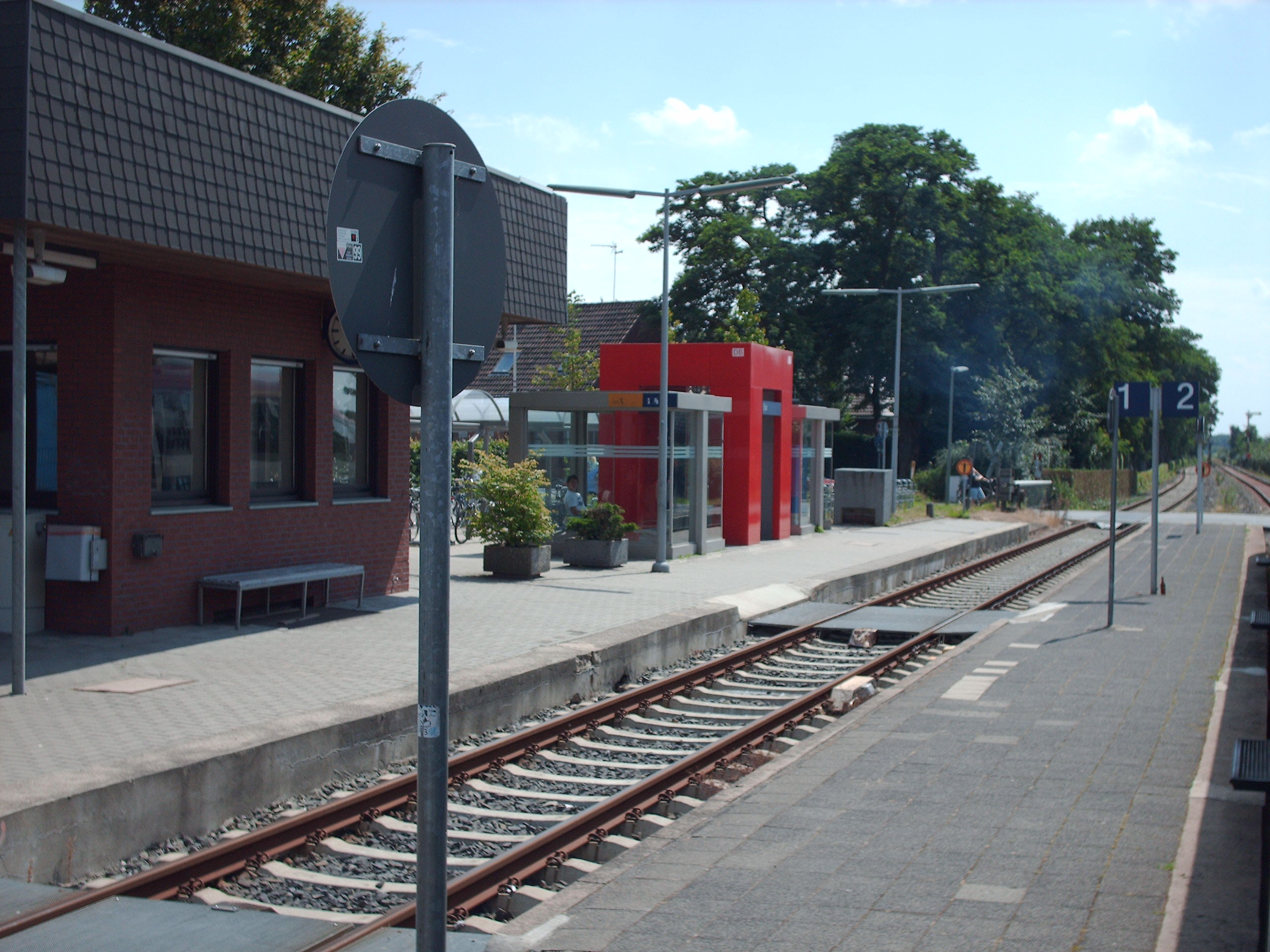
- Epe (Westf) station

General information
- Location: Epe, NRW, Germany
- Coordinates: 52°11′01″N 7°01′48″E
- Line: Dortmund–Gronau railway
- Platforms: 2
- Tracks: 2

Construction
- Accessible: No

Other information
- Fare zone: Westfalentarif: 57754
- Website: www.bahnhof.de

Services
Preceding station	DB Regio NRW	Following station
Gronau (Westf) towards Enschede	RB 51	Ahaus towards Dortmund Hbf
Location

Epe (Westf) (German: Bahnhof Epe (Westf)) is a railway station in the town of Epe, North Rhine-Westphalia, Germany. The station lies on the Dortmund–Gronau railway and the train services are operated by Deutsche Bahn.

== Train services ==
The station is served by the following services:

- Local service RB 51 Enschede - Gronau - Coesfeld - Lünen - Dortmund
