= Dülmen =

Place in North Rhine-Westphalia, Germany

- Town
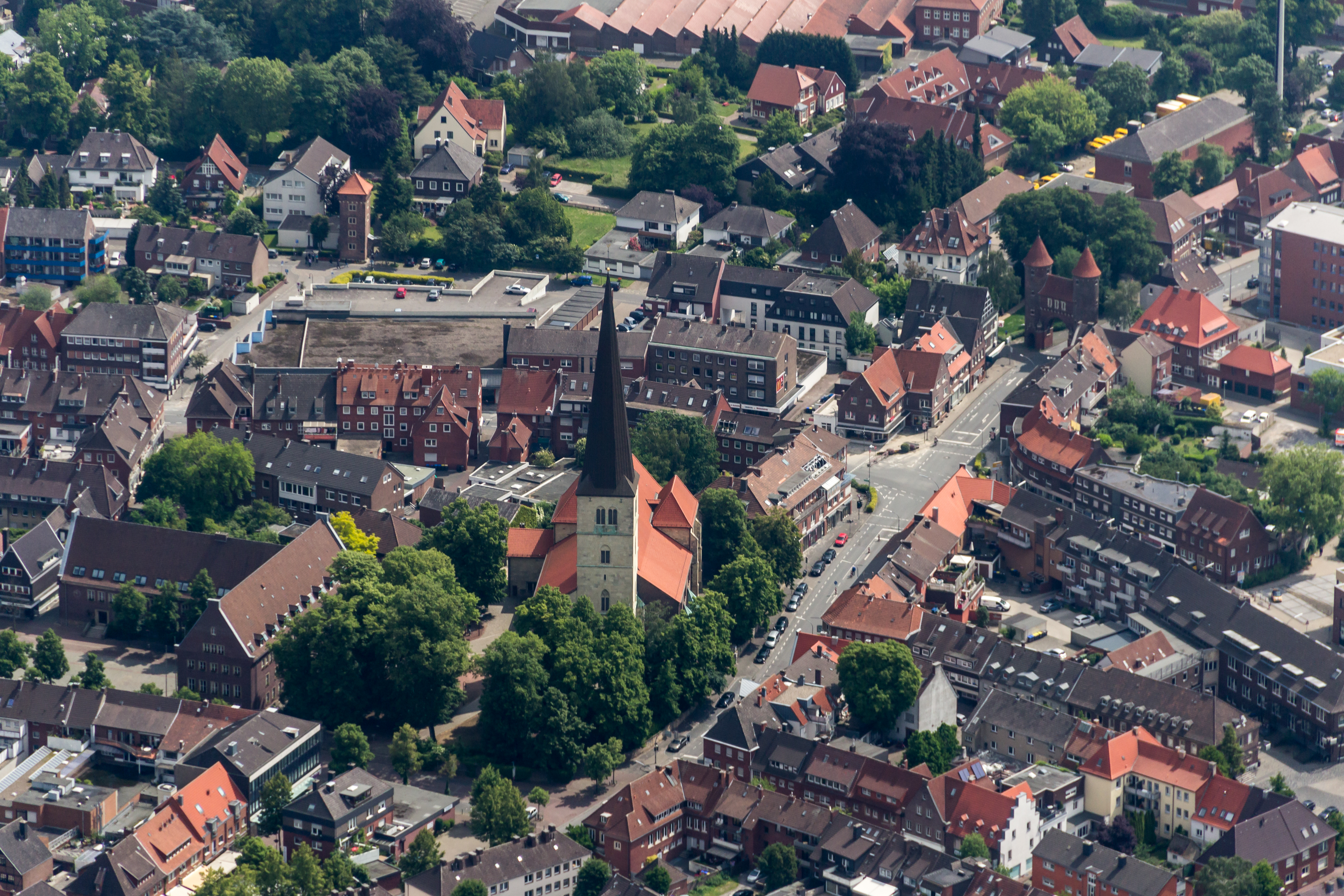
- Dülmen center with Town Hall and Market Square, St. Viktor Church

- Flag Coat of arms

- Location of Dülmen within Coesfeld district
- Interactive map of Dülmen
- Location within Germany Location within North Rhine-Westphalia
- Coordinates: 51°49′51″N 7°16′42″E
- Country: Germany
- State: North Rhine-Westphalia
- Admin. region: Münster
- District: Coesfeld
- Subdivisions: 7

Government
  - Mayor (2020–25): Carsten Hövekamp (CDU)

Area
  - Total: 184.83 km^{2} (71.36 sq mi)
- Elevation: 46–150 m (151–492 ft)

Population (2025-12-31)
  - Total: 47,759
  - Density: 258.39/km^{2} (669.24/sq mi)
- Time zone: UTC+01:00 (CET)
  - Summer (DST): UTC+02:00 (CEST)
- Postal codes: 48249
- Dialling codes: 02594 (some districts differ)
- Vehicle registration: COE
- Website: www.duelmen.de

Dülmen (German pronunciation: [ˈdʏlmən]) is a town in the district of Coesfeld, North Rhine-Westphalia, Germany.

== Geography ==
Dülmen is situated in the south part of the Münsterland area, between the Lippe river to the south, the Baumberge hills to the north and the Ems river to the east. South of Dülmen the Ruhr area is located.

=== Neighbouring municipalities ===
- Haltern
- Reken
- Coesfeld
- Billerbeck
- Nottuln
- Senden
- Lüdinghausen

=== Divisions ===
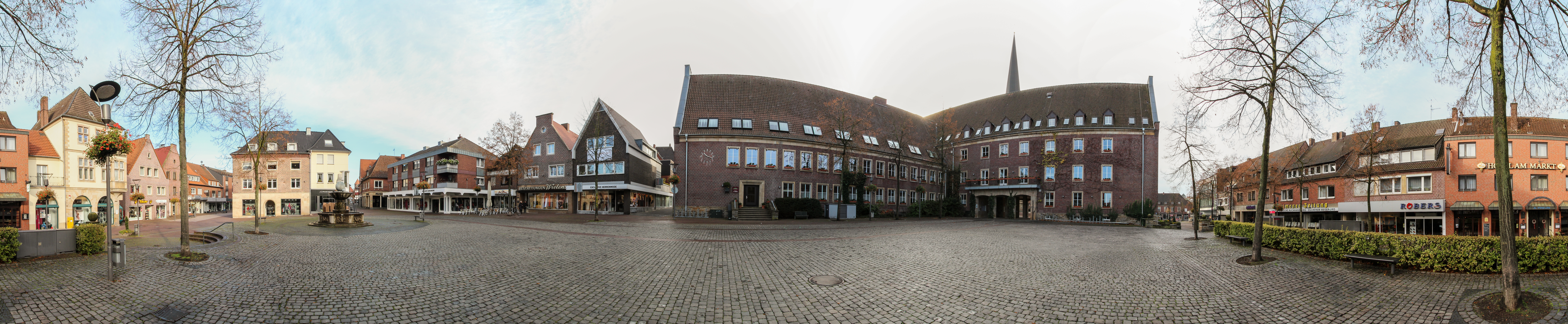
Town Hall and Market Square

After the local government reforms of 1975 Dülmen consists of the 7 subdivisions Dülmen, Kirchspiel, Buldern, Hausdülmen, Hiddingsel, Merfeld and Rorup.

Merfeld was first mentioned in 890. It became a part of Dülmen in 1975. It is known for its herd of Dülmen Ponies. Rorup was first mentioned in 1050 and became a district of Dülmen in 1975.

== History ==
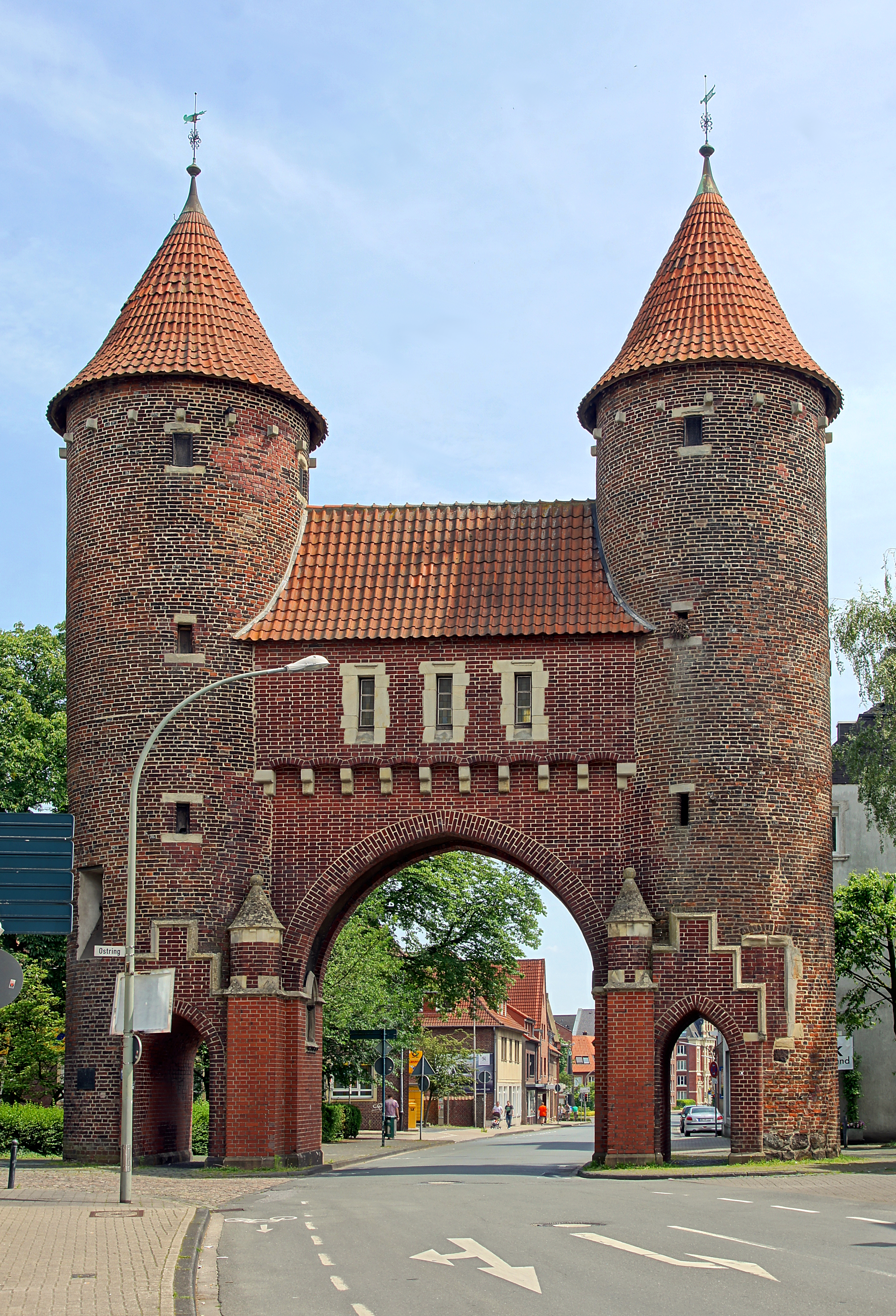
Lüdinghauser Tor

The place was first mentioned as Dulmenni in 889, as a property of Werden Abbey. Dülmen received town privileges in 1311. It joined the Hanseatic League in 1470. It was part of the Prince-Bishopric of Münster until it was mediatised in 1803. After a short period in the hands of the House of Croÿ, and later part of the Duchy of Arenberg, it was taken by the French in 1811. After the defeat of Napoleon, it became part of the Prussian Province of Westphalia. The Dülmen oil plant was a target of the Oil Campaign of World War II: 90% of the city was destroyed and the city was rebuilt after the war. In 1973, the population reached 20,000. In 1975, Rorup, Merfeld, Hiddingsel, Buldern, Hausdülmen and Kirchspiel Dülmen became part of Dülmen.

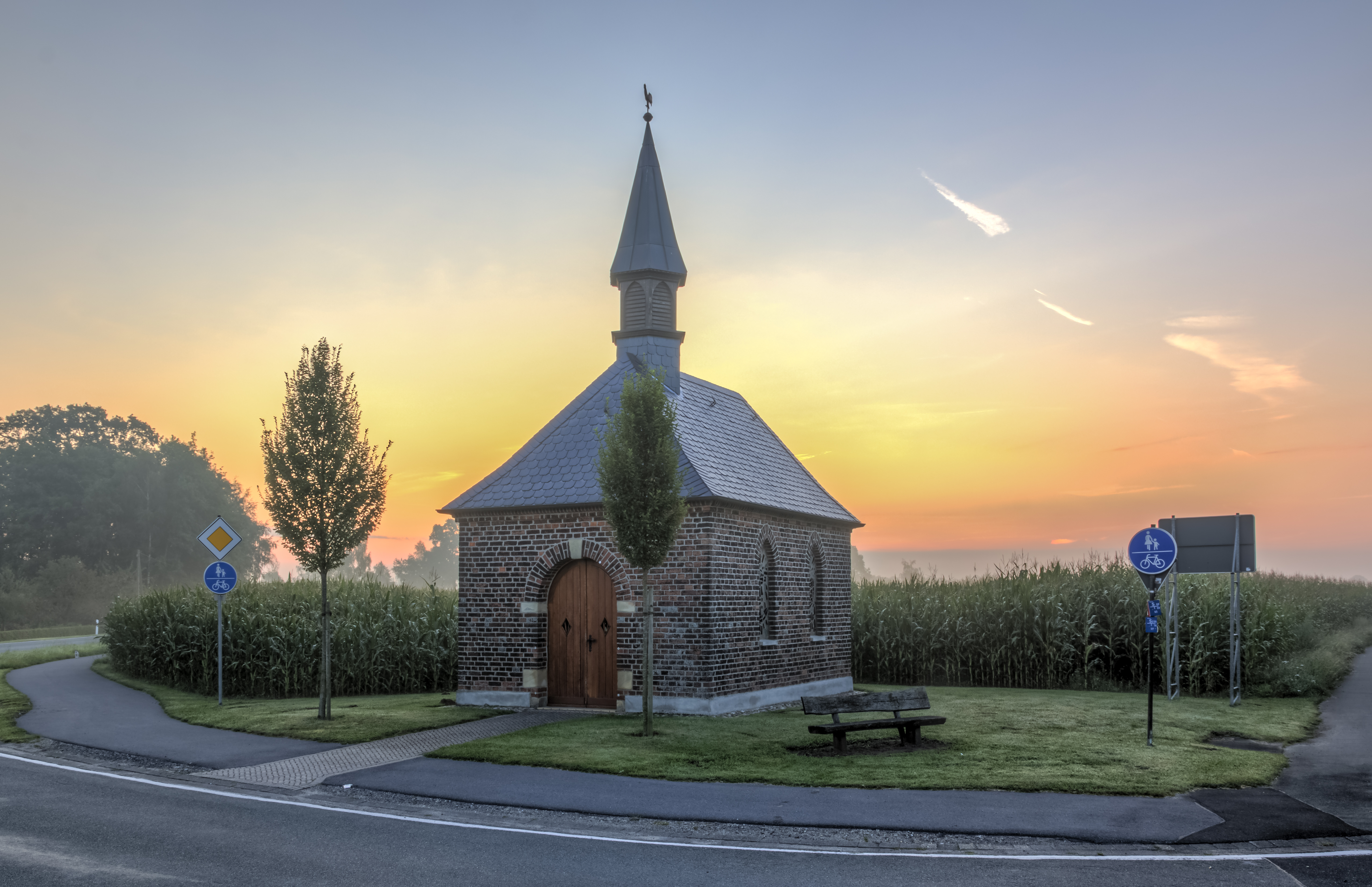
Saint John of Nepomuk chapel, Hiddingsel, Dülmen, North Rhine-Westphalia, Germany

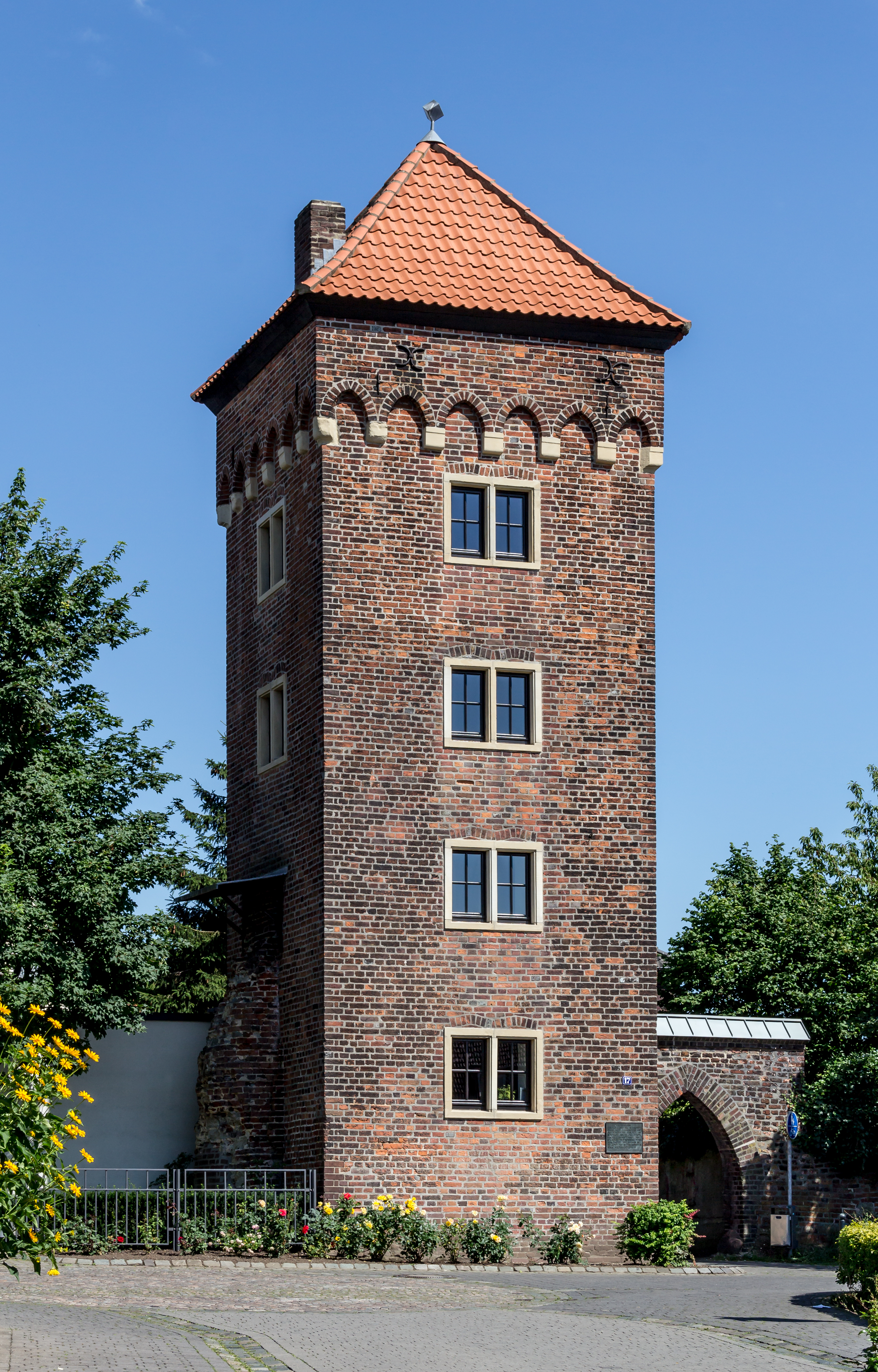
Nonnenturm in Dülmen

== Population ==
Historical population

Year	Pop.	±% p.a.
1965	30,941	—
1970	34,259	+2.06%
1975	37,017	+1.56%
1980	38,717	+0.90%
1985	39,790	+0.55%
1990	40,496	+0.35%
1995	44,277	+1.80%

Year	Pop.	±% p.a.
2000	46,552	+1.01%
2005	47,391	+0.36%
2010	46,762	−0.27%
2015	46,613	−0.06%
2020	46,706	+0.04%
2025	47,759	+0.45%

Source: Landesdatabank Nordrhein-Westfalen

== Twin towns – sister cities ==
Dülmen is twinned with:

- Charleville-Mézières, France

== Transportation ==
Dülmen can accessed by the A43. Dülmen station is on the Essen–Wanne Eickel–Münster line, which was built by the Cologne-Minden Railway Company, and the Dortmund–Gronau railway, which was built by the Dortmund-Gronau-Enschede Railway Company and links Dortmund and Gronau. The nearest airports are the Münster-Osnabrück Airport in Greven and the Düsseldorf Airport.

== Notable people ==
- Anne Catherine Emmerich (1774–1824), canoness and mystic, lived and died here
- Clemens Brentano (1778–1842), writer, lived here from 1819 to 1824
- Franz von Papen (1879–1969), politician, lived in Dülmen from 1918 to 1930
- Fritz Pütter (1895–1918), fighter pilot
- Marianne Werner (born 1924), athlete
- Jürgen Drews (born 1945), entertainer, lives here
- Andrè Stinka (born 1965), politician
- Hartmut Surmann (born 1963), robotics researcher
- Thekla Walker (born 1969), politician
- Franka Potente (born 1974), actress, lived here in childhood
