= Lünen Hauptbahnhof =

Railway station in Lünen, Germany

Lünen Hbf
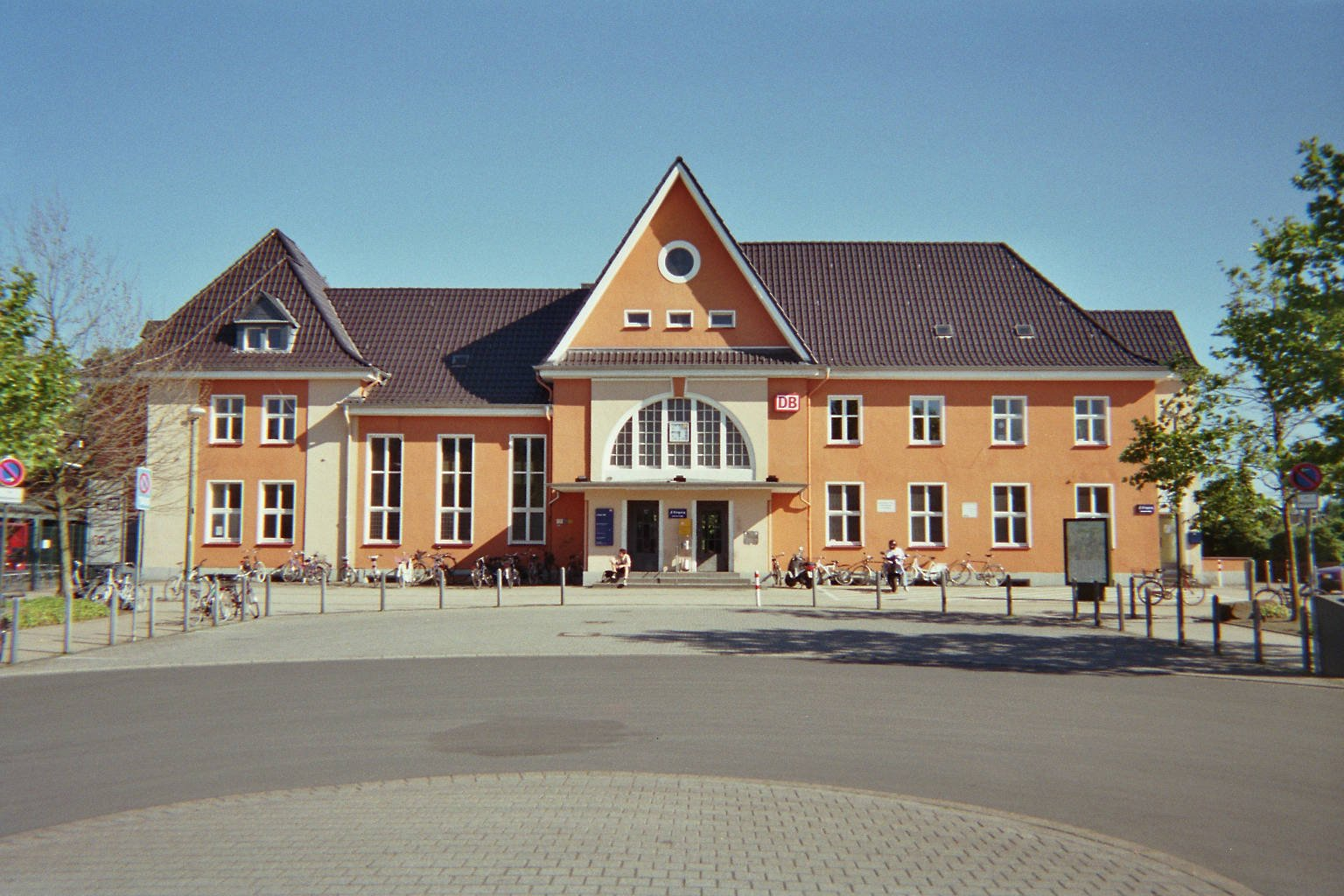

General information
- Location: Lünen, NRW; Germany
- Coordinates: 51°37′2.1″N 7°31′45.4″E
- Lines: Preußen–Münster (KBS 411); Dortmund–Gronau (KBS 412)
- Platforms: 4

Construction
- Accessible: Platforms 1, 2 only

Other information
- Station code: 3856
- DS100 code: ELUE
- Category: 4
- Fare zone: Westfalentarif: 42191
- Website: www.bahnhof.de

History
- Opened: 1928

Services
Preceding station		Following station
Preußen towards Münster Hbf	RB 50	Werne a d Lippe towards Dortmund Hbf
Preceding station	DB Regio NRW	Following station
Preußen towards Enschede	RB 51	Bork (Westf) towards Dortmund Hbf
Location

Lünen Hauptbahnhof is a railway station located north of central Lünen on the outskirts of Nordlünen in the German state of North Rhine-Westphalia.

== Significance ==
Lünen Hauptbahnhof is an important station for regional trains in the district of Unna. Only regional trains operate here. It is the most important transport hub for public transport within the city of Lünen and the northern part of the district of Unna, and it is classified by Deutsche Bahn as a category 4 station.

== Station facility ==
Lünen Hauptbahnhof is built at the railway junction and has diverging platforms. There are five tracks at the station, four of which are located on station platforms. The fifth track was used as a connection to the Victoria colliery and is now closed.

The station building is built between the diverging railways, which are on different levels. On the lower level is the Dortmund–Gronau line (KBS 412) with tracks 1 and 2, on the upper level is the Dortmund-Münster line (KBS 411) with tracks 3 and 4. There is also the disused track 5. The lower level connects to the nearby Lünen central bus station. Direct access to the platforms is possible through a tunnel from the lower level. The western end of this pedestrian tunnel provides an indirect passage to the inner city.

== Platforms ==
- Track 1: RB51 (Dortmund–Lünen–Coesfeld–Gronau–Enschede) and (Lünen–Dortmund)
- Track 2: RB51 (Enschede–Gronau–Coesfeld–Lünen–Dortmund)
- Track 3: RB50 (Münster–Lünen–Dortmund) and non-stopping long-distance trains (Münster–Dortmund)
- Track 4: RB50 (Dortmund–Lünen–Münster), and non-stopping long-distance trains (Dortmund - Münster)
- Track 5: closed (connection to the former Victoria colliery)

== History ==
The station was opened in 1917 as Lünen Ost station, but by 1925 it had been renamed Lünen Hauptbahnhof. It was not the first station in Lünen; this was the now disused Lünen-Nord station, which was opened at the end of the 19th century by the Dortmund-Gronau-Enschede Railway Company (German: Dortmund-Gronau-Enscheder Eisenbahn-Gesellschaft).

The station's entrance building has been extensively renovated.

== Services ==
Lünen station is served by two regional railway lines.

Line	Line name	Route	Operator
RB 50	Der Lüner	Dortmund – Lünen – Werne (a d Lippe) – Münster (Westf)	eurobahn
RB 51	Westmünsterland-Bahn	Dortmund – Lünen – Dülmen – Coesfeld (Westf) – Enschede	Prignitzer Eisenbahn
