= Rosendahl-Holtwick station =

Railway station in Rosendahl, Germany

Rosendahl Holtwick
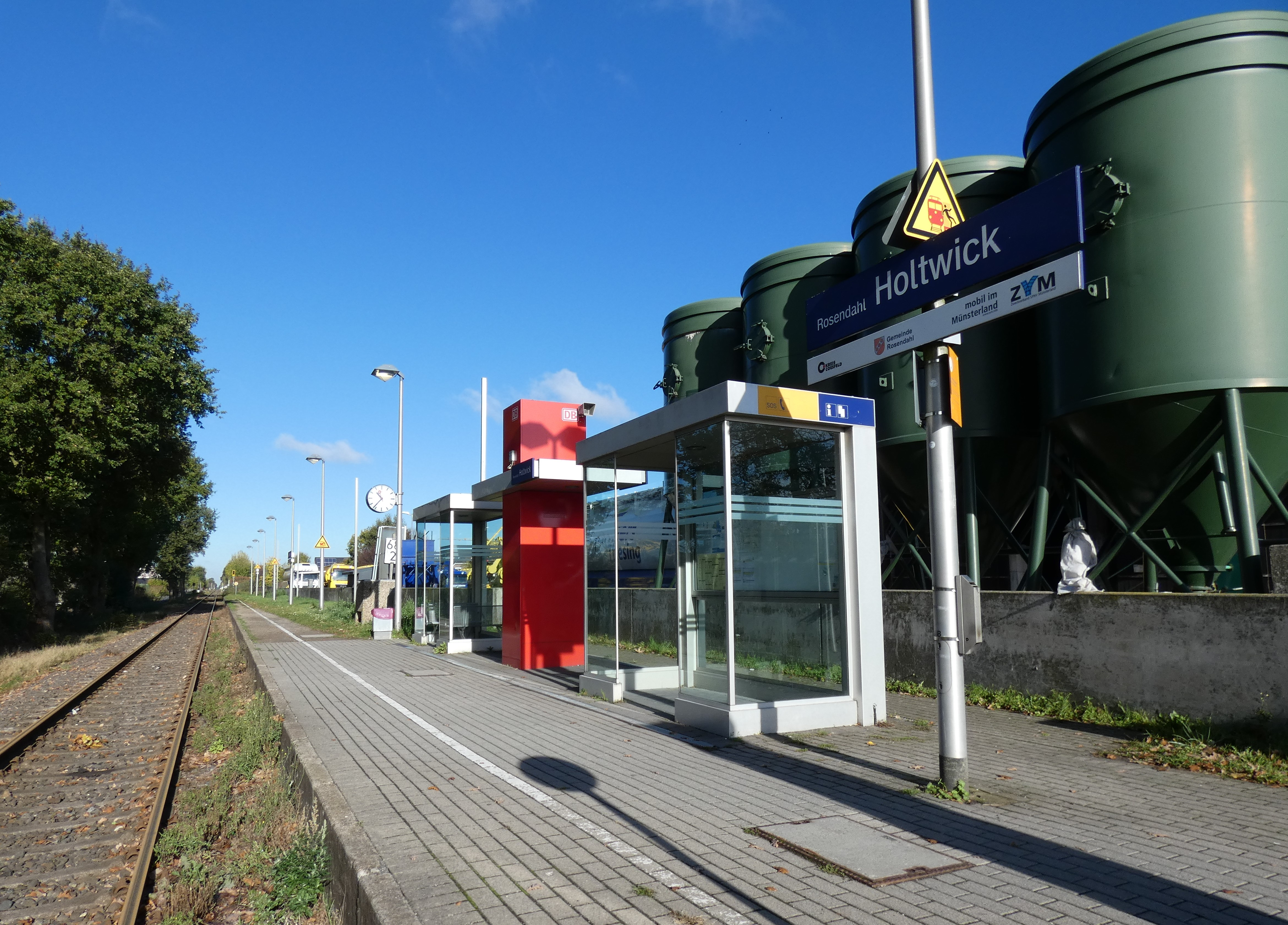
- Rosendahl-Holtwick station

General information
- Location: Rosendahl, NRW, Germany
- Coordinates: 51°59′53″N 7°07′21″E
- Line: Dortmund–Gronau railway
- Platforms: 1
- Tracks: 1

Construction
- Accessible: Yes

Other information
- Fare zone: Westfalentarif: 55426
- Website: www.bahnhof.de

Services
| Preceding station | DB Regio NRW | Following station |
|---|---|---|
| Legden towards Enschede | RB 51 | Coesfeld towards Dortmund Hbf |
Location

Rosendahl-Holtwick (German: Bahnhof Rosendahl-Holtwick) is a railway station in the town of Rosendahl, North Rhine-Westphalia, Germany. The station lies on the Dortmund–Gronau railway and the train services are operated by Deutsche Bahn.

== Train services ==
The station is served by the following services:

- Local service RB 51 Enschede - Gronau - Coesfeld - Lünen - Dortmund
