= Lüdinghausen station =

Railway station in Lüdinghausen, Germany

Lüdinghausen
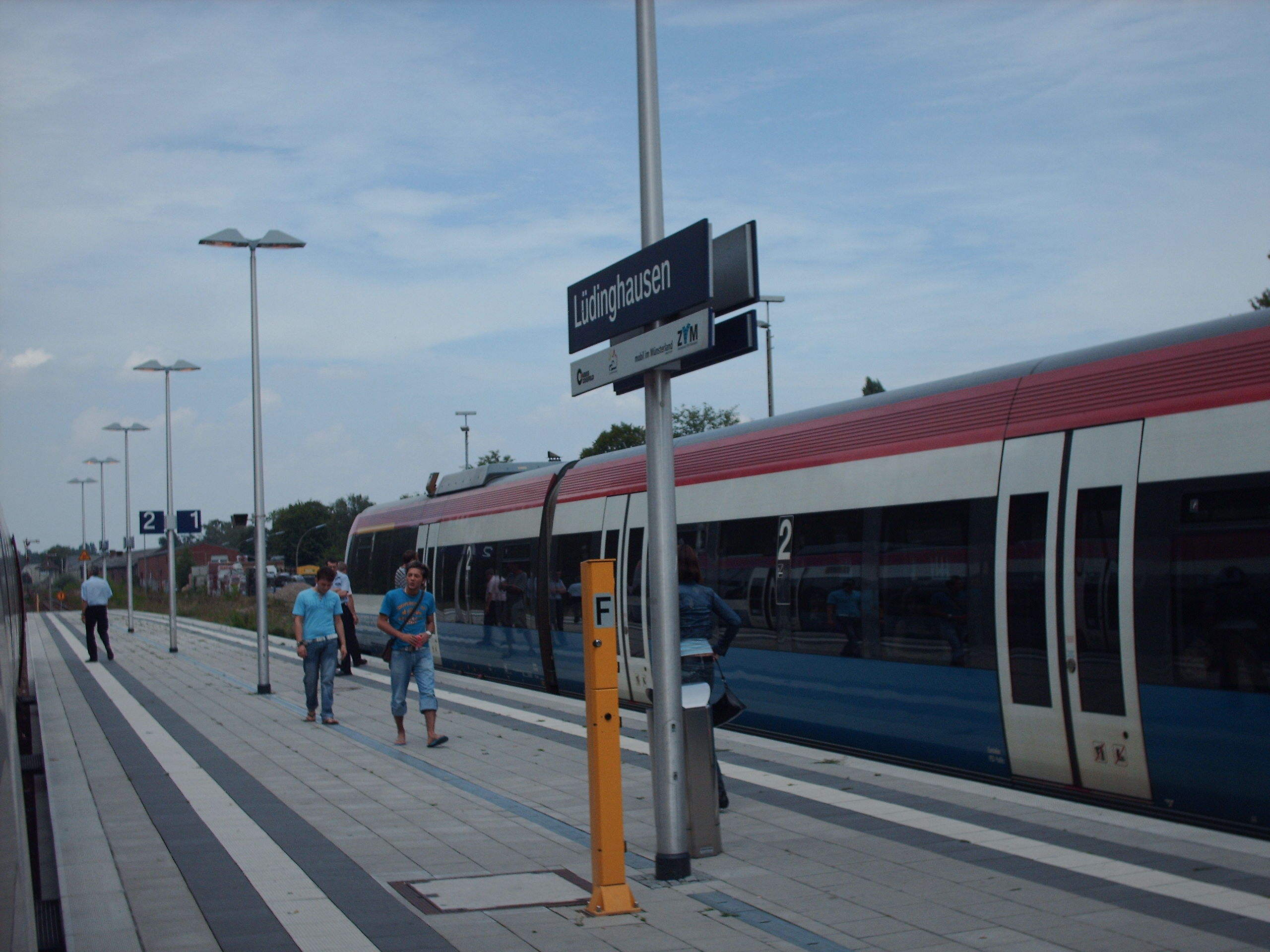

General information
- Location: Lüdinghausen, North Rhine-Westphalia, Germany
- Coordinates: 51.758550°N 7.433871°E
- System: Bf
- Owner: Deutsche Bahn
- Operator: DB Station&Service (railway station); DB Netz (signal towers)
- Line: Dortmund–Gronau railway (KBS 412)
- Platforms: 1
- Tracks: 2

Other information
- Fare zone: Westfalentarif: 55511

History
- Opened: 1875

Services
Preceding station	DB Regio NRW	Following station
Dülmen towards Enschede	RB 51	Selm towards Dortmund Hbf
Location
- Location within North Rhine-Westphalia Location within Germany Location within Europe

The Lüdinghausen railway station is a station of the Dortmund–Gronau railway located at the Westphalian city of Lüdinghausen. It was opened in Summer 1875. Trains of the line RB51 call at Lüdinghausen. In December 2011, the Deutsche Bahn AG stopped selling tickets in Lüdinghausen.

The railway station consists of two signal boxes with mechanic operation, (Ln (pointsman) and Lf (signalman)), two level crossings (Olfener Straße and Seppenrader Straße), two platform tracks with a centre platform, two dead-end sidings with buffer stops, and six sets of points, out of which four are remote-controlled, one is operated by wagon shunters with a nearby lever, and one is out of order. A local distillery is connected to the station.
