= Hartmut Surmann =

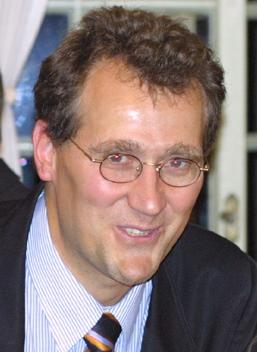
- Hartmut Surmann at a workshop at Fraunhofer Campus Birlinghoven (Sankt Augustin, August 2002)
- Born: 1963 (age 62–63); Dülmen, West Germany
- Education: University of Dortmund
- Scientific career
- Fields: Robotics and Computational Intelligence
- Workplaces: Fraunhofer IAIS, Sankt Augustin, University of Applied Science Gelsenkirchen
- Doctoral advisor: Karl Goser; Manfred Glesner

Hartmut Surmann (born 1963 in Dülmen, West Germany) is a roboticist and Professor for Autonomous Systems at Applied University of Gelsenkirchen and Researcher at the Fraunhofer Society's Institute for Intelligent Analysis and Information Systems (IAIS). His primary research interests are autonomous mobile robotics and computational intelligence. He received several awards, e.g., the FUZZ-IEEE/IFES'95 robot intelligence award, NC2001 best presentation award, SSRR 2005 best paper award and the Ph.D. award for his thesis from the German AI institutes in 1996. His robot KURT3D won the second place in the RoboCup rescue robot league at the world championship in Lisbon in 2004. He leads the international rescue robotic team during collapse of the historical archive of the city of cologne in March 2009.

== Biography ==
=== Education ===
Surmann received his diploma in Computer Science and his PhD in Electrical Engineering from the University of Dortmund, Germany, in 1989 and 1995, respectively.
