= Preußen–Münster railway =

Railway line in Germany

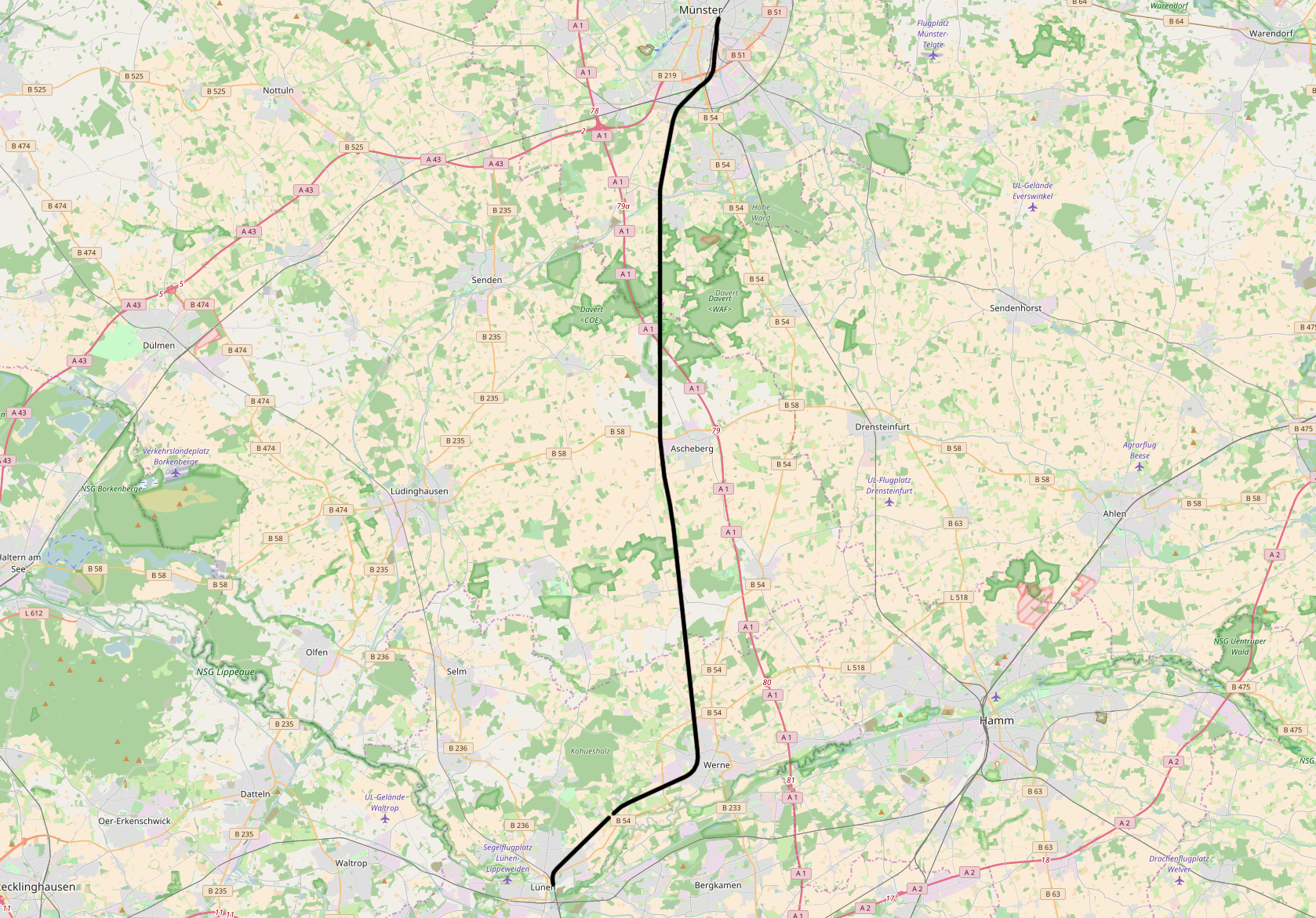

Overview
- Line number: 2000
- Locale: North Rhine-Westphalia, Germany

Service
- Route number: 411

Technical
- Line length: 45 km (28 mi)
- Track gauge: 1,435 mm (4 ft 8 1/2 in) standard gauge
- Electrification: 15 kV/16.7 Hz AC overhead catenary
- Operating speed: 160 km/h (99 mph)

The Preußen–Münster railway is a 45 kilometre-long, largely single-track and electrified main line railway from Münster to Lünen in the German state of North Rhine-Westphalia. It is served by a Regionalbahn service called Der Lüner.

== History ==
The line was built by the Deutsche Reichsbahn-Gesellschaft (German State Railway Company) to create a direct connection between the Westphalian cities of Dortmund and Münster. The new line was built from the station of Preußen on the Dortmund–Gronau line to Munster and opened on 18 October 1928.

On 8 March 1990, the line had to be closed due to the collapse of an embankment. Repairs continued for more than a year, until the line was re-opened to passenger traffic was on 2 June 1991.

== Planned upgrade ==
The line was originally built with a single-track with the embankment wide enough for a second track. With the increasing traffic volumes serving the mining and steel industry, the line was expected to be duplicated. However, this never occurred because of war and inflation.

Furthermore, there was a plan to build a line from a branch on the Dortmund–Hamm line east of Dortmund-Scharnhorst station to Werne on the line to Munster. This would have sped up long-distance services between Dortmund and Münster by avoiding the tight curves at the station exit from Dortmund and at Lünen and the tight curve on the approach to Werne. It would have also avoided the disruption to services caused by incoming and outgoing trains crossing each other's tracks on the eastern approach to Dortmund station. These plans were never implemented in practice.

The duplication of the line and upgrading of the track for a top speed of 200 km/h was listed in the 2003 Federal Transport Infrastructure Plan and classified as a "priority project". On 12 December 2008 the upgrading of the line was approved. The implementation of the plans, however, is still expected to take a few years.

The development cost was estimated in December 2008 to be €180 million. After in-depth investigations, the cost had increased at the end of April 2010 to around € 377 million. On 20 August 2009, the German Ministry of Transport and Deutsche Bahn AG signed a contract for the project. The plan is to complete technical planning in late 2011 with environmental approval procedures beginning in 2012. The German government funded the cost of preliminary planning.

== Operations ==
The Regionalbahn service RB 50 (Der Lüner) from Dortmund (running via the Dortmund–Gronau line) runs once an hour in the window between long-distance trains, stopping at all stations. Since the distance between Lünen and Münster is only single track until the planned upgrade is carried out no increase of this service is possible.

InterCity trains from the Ruhr area to the north of Germany run over the one-track line between Dortmund and Münster only on the basis of one train per hour in each direction. Every two hours, a pair of trains run on the Wanne-Eickel–Hamburg line.
