= Wiebke Muhsal =

German politician (born 1986)

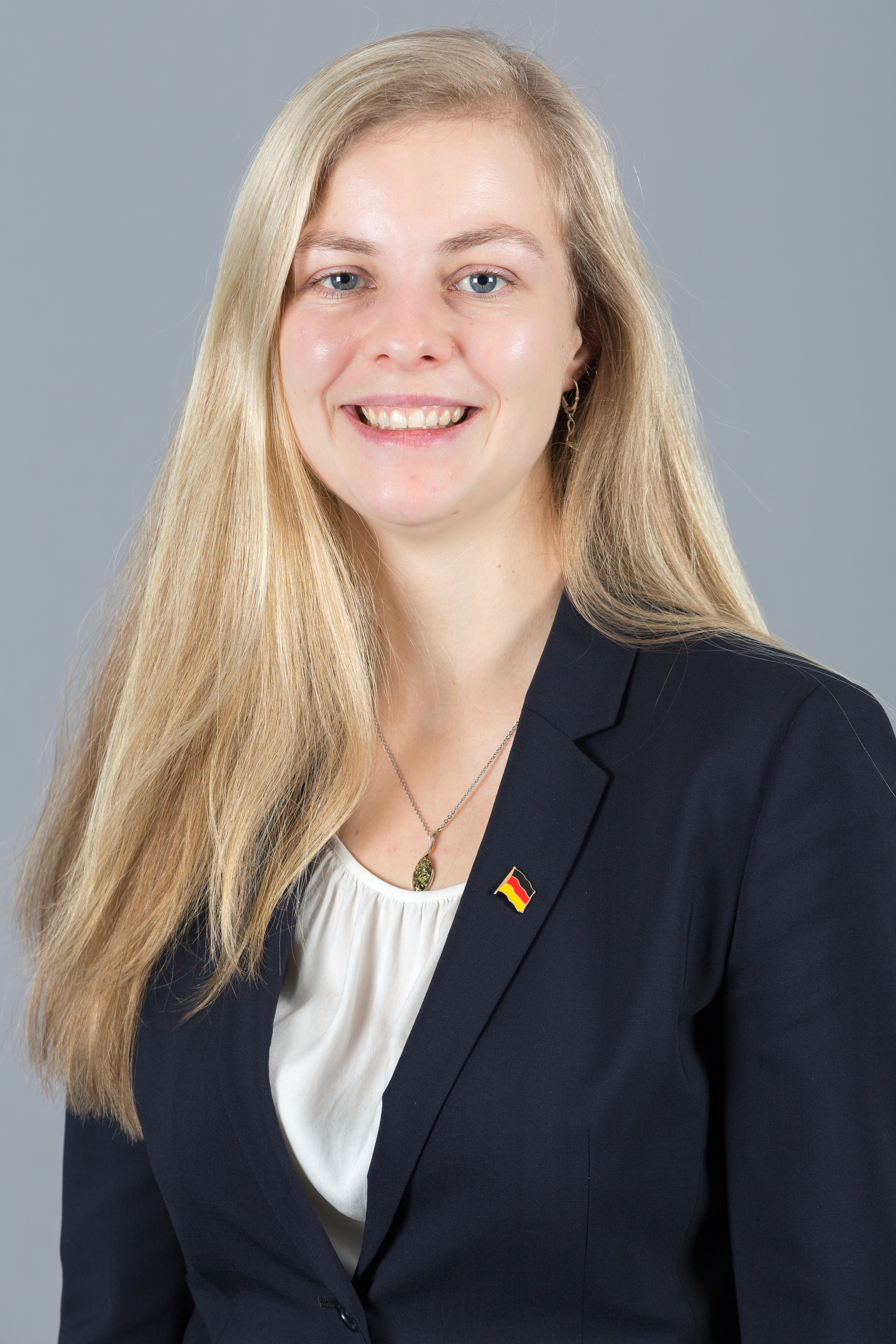
- Muhsal in 2016

Member of the Landtag of Thuringia
- Incumbent
- Assumed office 2014

Personal details
- Born: 6 April 1986 (age 40) Lüdinghausen, North Rhine-Westphalia, West Germany (Now Germany)
- Party: Alternative für Deutschland (AfD)
- Children: 5
- Education: University of Jena

Wiebke Muhsal (born 6 April 1986) is a German politician with the Alternative für Deutschland (AfD). Since 2014, she is a member of the Landtag of Thuringia and deputy chairman of the AfD caucus. She is also her party's critic on family and education policy and is a member of the Parliamentary Committee on Education, Youth and Sports.

== Life and education ==
Muhsal was raised in Münster and Bad Salzuflen. In 2005 she began studying Jurisprudence at the University of Jena, from which in 2012 she graduated with a Diplom-Juristin degree. After completing her studies, she devoted herself primarily to raising her three sons until her election to the Thuringian Landtag in 2014. Muhsal is married and lives in Jena. She is a practising Roman Catholic.

== Political engagement ==
Muhsal joined the AfD in November 2013. She is the AfD spokeswoman for the Jena-Gera-Saale-Holzland district, and a member of the working group on family, health, and demography as well as leader of the working group on education, science, and culture. After the 2014 state elections in Thuringia, she was elected to the Thuringian Landtag. In July 2015 she was selected as the state representative for the Young Alternative for Germany.

In 2016, Muhsal wore a Niqab to the Thuringian Landtag (state parliament) in a protest calling for a ban on the face covering.

The Thuringian AfD parliamentary group wants to propose Wiebke Muhsal as a candidate for the office of state parliament president in 2024.

== Positions ==
Muhsal is primarily interested in education and family policy. She advocates a marriage loan (Ehekredit) for young couples similar to practises in the former GDR and a basic allowance for children (Baukindergeld). She also argued for the preservation of the state education allowance (Landeserziehungsgeld) and stood for a further developing the family allowance. In March 2015 she was the first signatory to the so-called "Erfurt Resolution".

== Conviction for fraud ==
Wiebke Muhsal predated an employment contract with an employee by two months in 2014 in order to receive additional money from the state parliament administration. According to the court, she used the alleged salary for the employee to finance office equipment, a smartphone and a website.

In June 2015 at the request of the public prosecutor in Erfurt, the Thuringian Landtag lifted the parliamentary immunity on Muhsal to enable a criminal investigation against her. Muhsal denied the allegations and launched a counter-accusation of libel. Erfurt Regional Court sentenced her to a fine of 8,000 euros. The appeal against this was finally dismissed by the Thuringian Higher Regional Court in 2017.

== Links ==
- Official biography (in German) at the Landtag of Thuringia.
