= Andrè Stinka =

German politician

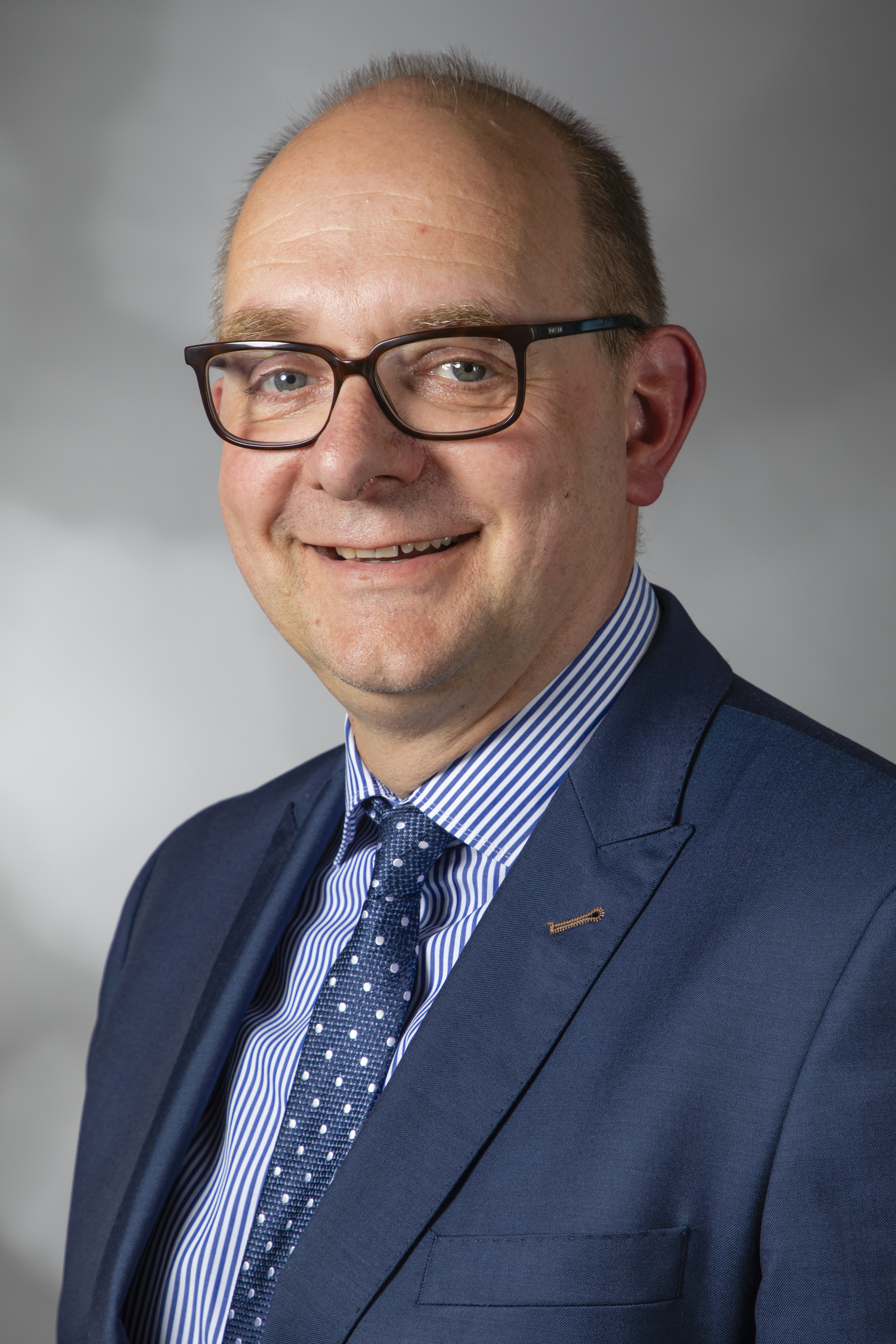

Andrè Stinka (born 13 June 1965 in Dülmen) is a German politician for the Social Democratic Party of Germany and since 2015 member of the Landtag of North Rhine-Westphalia, the federal diet of North Rhine-Westphalia.

== Life and politics ==
Stinka was born in the West German town of Dülmen and became member of the federal diet from 2005 to 2012 and again since 2015.
