= Wilm Weppelmann =

German artist and writer (1957–2021)

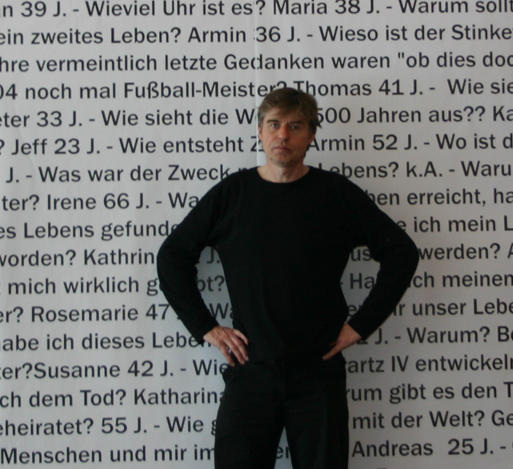
- Wilm Weppelmann in front of his art installation „The Last Question“ Stuttgart Germany 2005
- Born: 17 April 1957; Lüdinghausen, Germany
- Died: 5 November 2021 (aged 64)

Wilm Weppelmann (17 April 1957 – 5 November 2021) was a German artist, conceptual artist, garden artist, photographer and writer based in Münster Germany, with extensive solo exhibitions (Town Museum Münster, Museum for Sepulchral Culture Kassel, etc.) concerning the boundaries of human existence. Since 2005, Weppelmann has focused primarily on the meaning of garden culture and its role in the development of human existence.

== Work and projects ==
Weppelmann's artist projects are interdisciplinary, as he brings a wide variety of disciplines together. Conceptual art, performance art, video art, photographic art, garden art and installation are often included in an overall staging and complemented by an independently curated cultural program. Subversion as an artistic strategy often emphasizes the critical and political statement of his work.

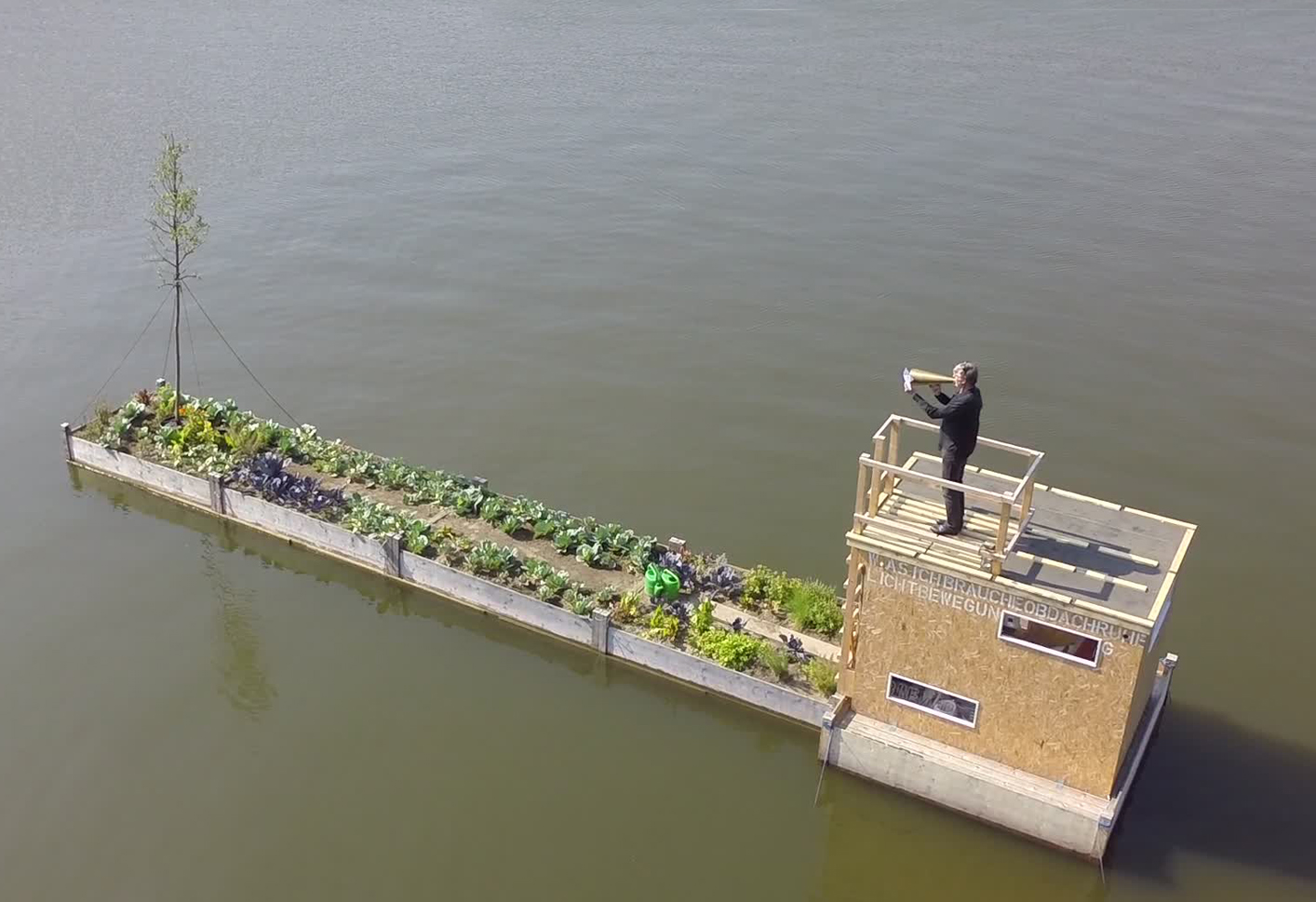
aFarm II –an installation by Wilm Weppelmann (2014) on the lake Aasee in Münster Germany

Since 2005, at all levels of his artistic work, the urban garden and urban green takes a pre-eminent position, these include: staged photography, interventions in public space, guerilla gardening, continuous art performances, soil and plant art installations, floating vegetable gardens and other garden creations that deal with historical themes. Central points of reference are the allotment garden, the vegetable culture and, accordingly, the self-sufficiency economy.

== Partial bibliography ==
- Aus dem Woerterbuch der Sterblichkeiten (1996)
- Ich verlaesst ich (2003) ISBN 3-930322-45-5
- Die Kunst in sich zu wohnen (2004) ISBN 3-924447-27-6
- Sterben kommt (2004) ISBN 3-924447-25-X
