= Bernd Strasser =

German water polo player (1936–2025)

Personal information
- Nationality: German
- Born: 22 January 1936 Lüdinghausen, Germany
- Died: 7 July 2025 (aged 89)

Sport
- Sport: Water polo

Bernd Strasser (22 January 1936 – 7 July 2025) was a German water polo player. He competed in the men's tournament at the 1960 Summer Olympics.

Strasser died on 7 July 2025, at the age of 89.
