= Dülmen station =

Railway station in Germany

Dülmen

General information
- Location: Bahnhofstr. 50, Dülmen, North Rhine-Westphalia; Germany
- Coordinates: 51°49′38″N 7°17′41″E
- Lines: Wanne-Eickel–Hamburg (KBS 425); Dortmund–Gronau (KBS 412)
- Platforms: 4

Construction
- Accessible: Yes

Other information
- Station code: 1390
- DS100 code: EDUL (low level); EDULH (high level)
- IBNR: 8000083
- Category: 4
- Fare zone: Westfalentarif: 55521
- Website: www.bahnhof.de

History
- Opened: 1 January 1870

Services
Preceding station	DB Regio NRW	Following station
Sythen towards Düsseldorf Hbf	RE 2	Buldern towards Osnabrück Hbf
Sythen towards Mönchengladbach Hbf	RE 42	Buldern towards Münster Hbf
Lette (Kr Coesfeld) towards Enschede	RB 51	Lüdinghausen towards Dortmund Hbf
Location

Dülmen station is one of two operating tower stations (of six that formerly operated) in the German state of North Rhine-Westphalia. It is located in Dülmen in western Münsterland. It is at the crossing of the Wanne-Eickel–Hamburg and the Dortmund–Gronau railways.

== History ==
The Cologne-Minden Railway Company (German: Cöln-Mindener Eisenbahn-Gesellschaft, CME) received a concession on 28 May 1866 to build a railway from Wanne to Osnabrück. This would be part of the inter-regional Hamburg–Venlo railway, which in turn would be part of an international Paris–Hamburg railway. On 1 January 1870, the CME started passenger operations on the first section between Wanne station (now Wanne-Eickel Central Station (Hauptbahnhof)) on its trunk line and Münster station (now Münster (Westfalen) Hauptbahnhof) and it opened the first Dülmen station at the same time.

Germany and the Netherlands agreed on 13 November 1874 to establish a direct rail link between Enschede and Dortmund. The Dortmund-Gronau-Enschede Railway Company (Dortmund-Gronau-Enscheder Eisenbahn-Gesellschaft, DGE) was established for this purpose and the first section was opened to Lünen station (now Lünen Nord) already on 25 November 1874. Dülmen DGE station was opened half a kilometre northwest of the Cologne-Minden station on 15 June 1875 and a grade-separated crossing was created during the building of the next section of the DGE to Dülmen. On 1 August 1875, the line was extended to the Coesfeld (Westf) station. After the nationalisation of the (nominally) private railway companies and their absorption by the Prussian state railways, Dülmen DGE station was renamed Dülmen Ost (east) station, although it was just west of the Cologne-Minden station.

With the construction of a curve north of the station between the two previously independent lines connecting the lines towards Coesfeld and Münster, the station became a junction station in practice. In the 1950s, passengers operations were moved from Dülmen Ost station to a high-level platform built at Dülmen station, so that Dülmen station was now a “tower” station (Turmbahnhof, that is a station with superimposed platforms on two levels). The connecting curve was closed and dismantled in the 1990s.

East of the station there was formerly a connecting curve connecting the lines towards Münster and Lünen. This was destroyed in the Second World War and was never rebuilt; the rest of the track is still used as a siding. Neither connecting curves were used for passenger services.

The station building that was opened on 20 May 1964 is located on the corner of the intersection that is north of the Wanne-Eickel–Hamburg line and west of the Dortmund–Gronau line. The station building built by the Cologne-Minden Railway Company was demolished in 1977.

Signal box controlling both routes

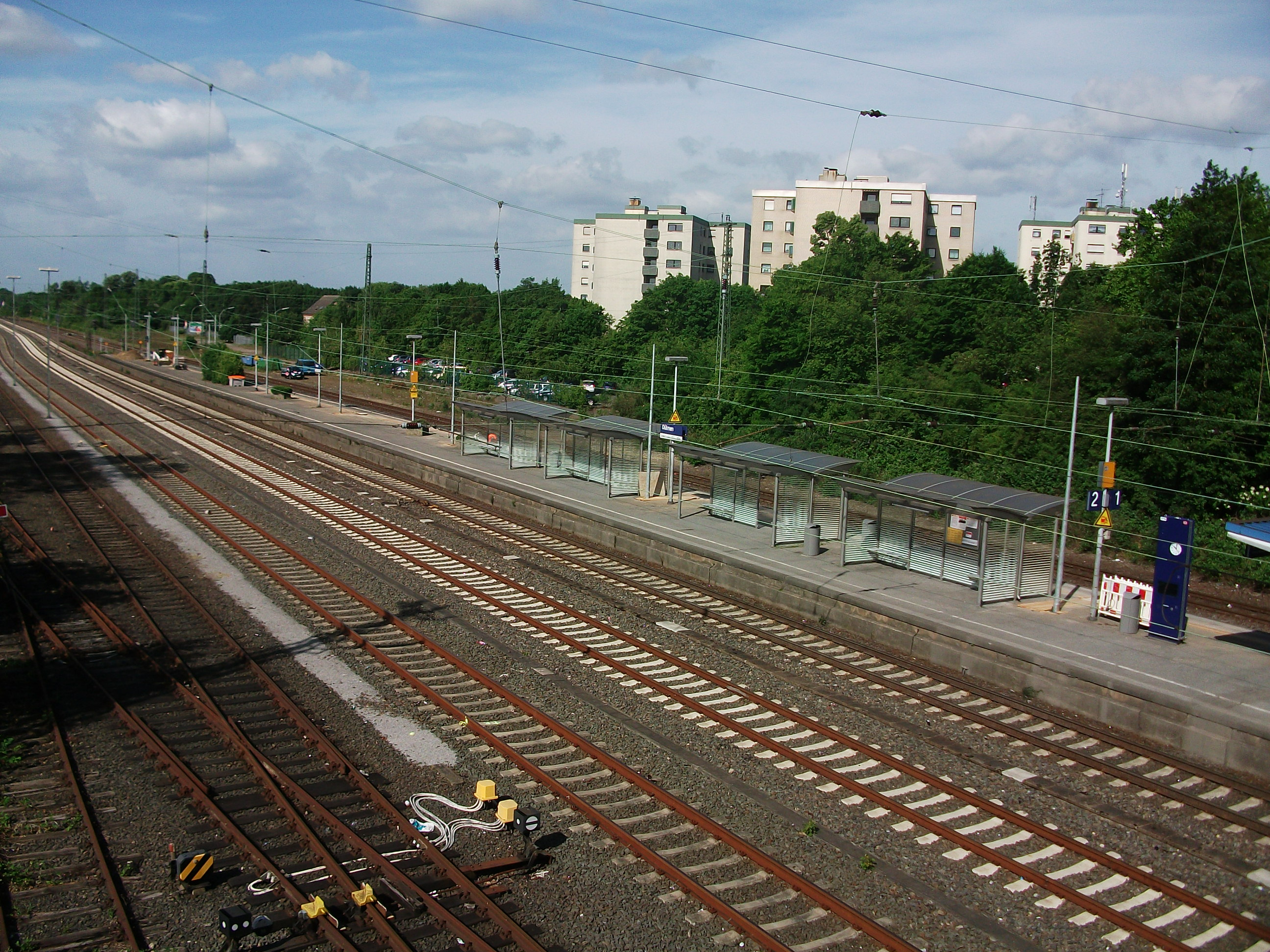
Lower platform

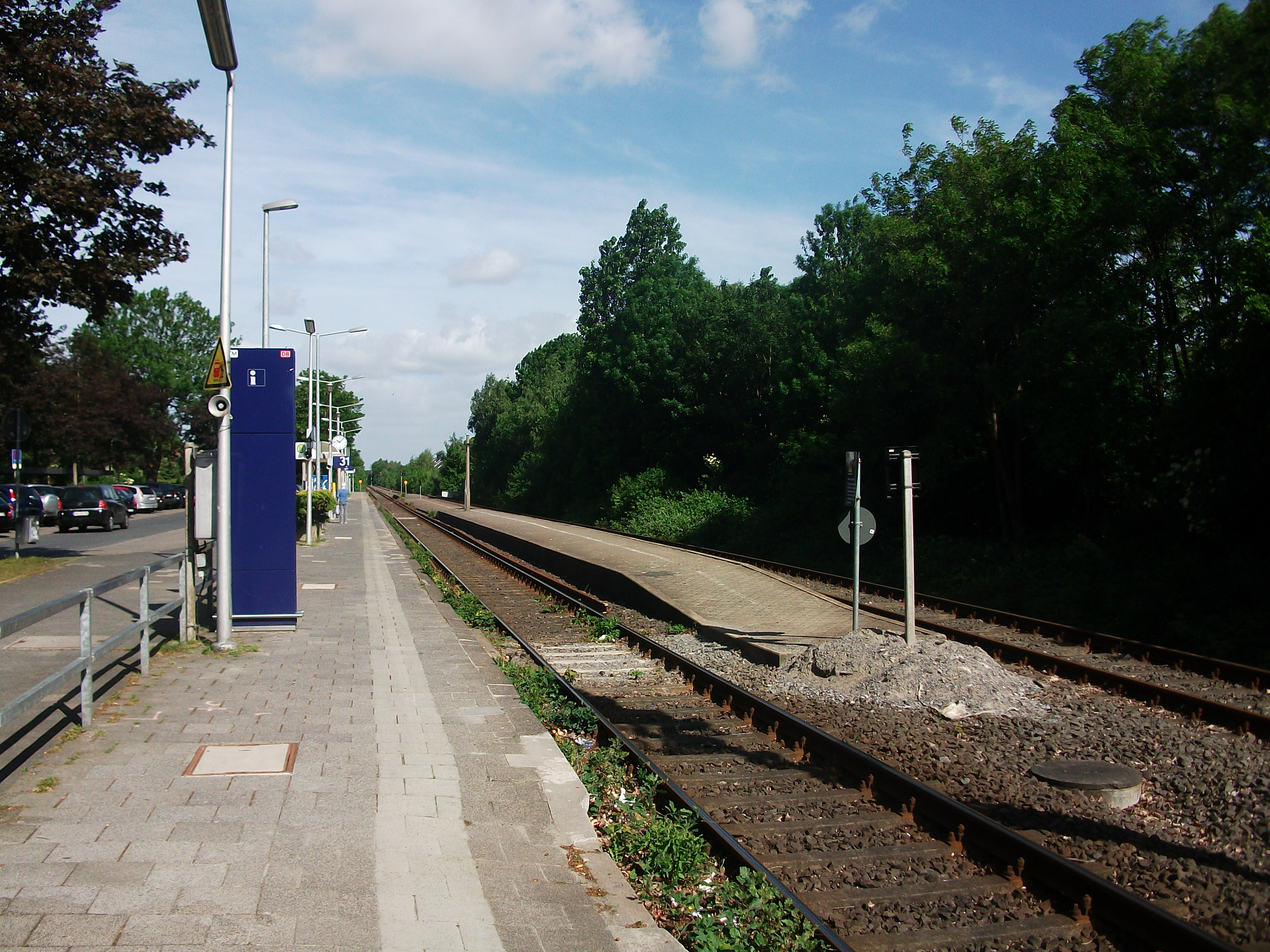
Upper platform

== Train services ==
The station is served by the following services:

- Local service RE 2 Rhein-Haard-Express Düsseldorf - Duisburg - Essen - Recklinghausen - Dülmen - Münster
- Local service RE 42 Niers-Haard-Express Münster – Haltern am See – Recklinghausen – Gelsenkirchen – Essen – Mülheim – Duisburg – Krefeld – Viersen – Mönchengladbach
- Local service RB 51 Westmünsterland-Bahn Enschede - Gronau - Coesfeld - Dülmen - Lünen - Dortmund
