= Friedrich Christian Gregor Wernekinck =

German anatomist

Friedrich Christian Gregor Wernekinck (13 March 1798 – 23 March 1835) was a German anatomist. His specialties were anatomy and mineralogy. Wernekinck was born in Münster (Bishopric of Münster, Holy Roman Empire) in 1798. After attending the University of Münster and University of Göttingen, he received his doctorate at the University of Giessen, where he became a full professor of philosophy in 1826. He died in 1835.

He was the son of botanist Franz Wernekinck (1764–1839).

== Associated eponym ==
- Horseshoe-shaped commissure of Wernekinck, term introduced by Wernekinck's student Franz Joseph Julius Wilbrand in 1840; also known as the decussation of the brachium conjunctivum or of the superior cerebellar peduncle.
