= Lüdinghausen =

- Town
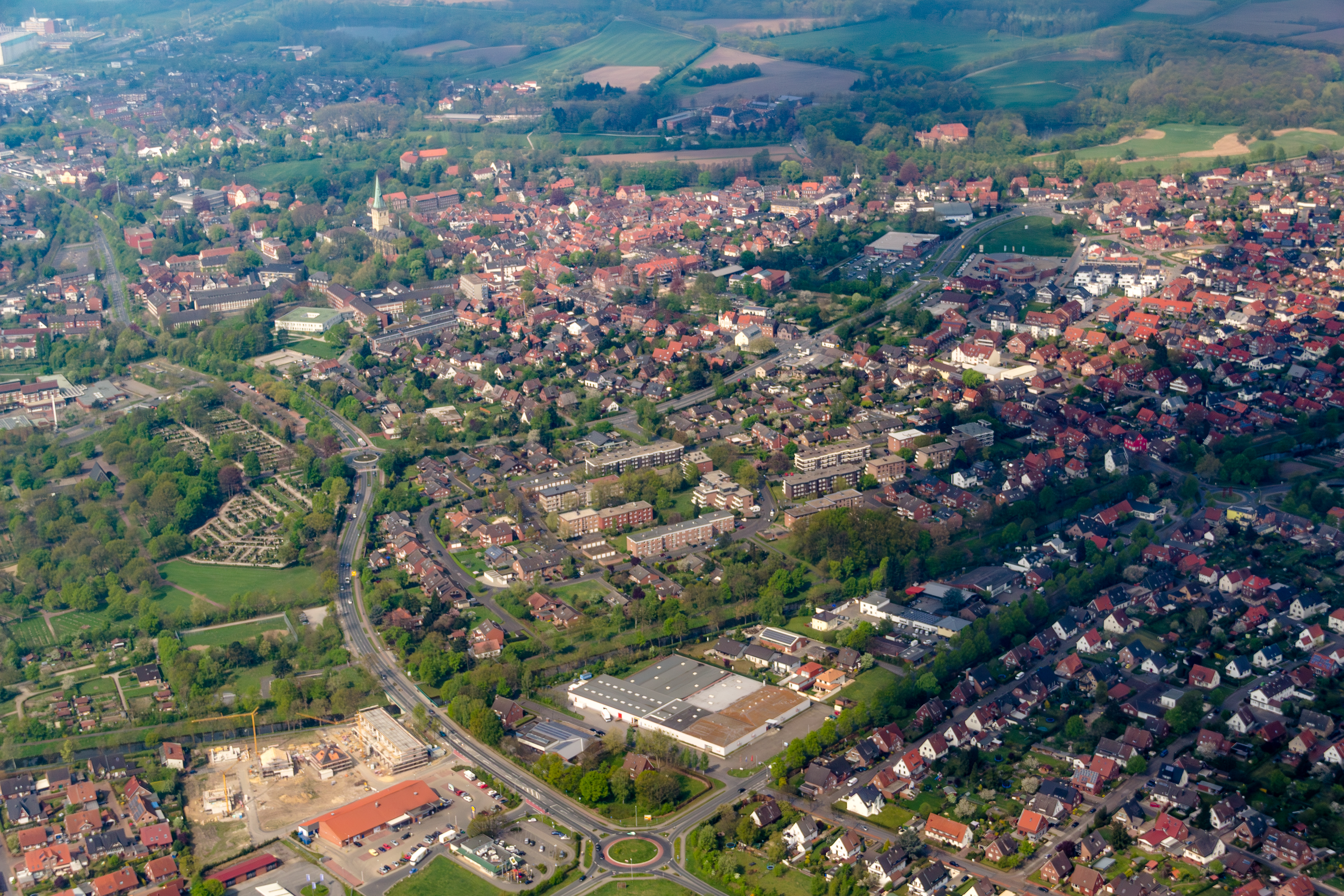
- Aerial photo of Lüdinghausen

- Flag Coat of arms

- Location of Lüdinghausen within Coesfeld district
- Interactive map of Lüdinghausen
- Location within Germany Location within North Rhine-Westphalia
- Coordinates: 51°46′N 7°26′E
- Country: Germany
- State: North Rhine-Westphalia
- Admin. region: Münster
- District: Coesfeld
- Subdivisions: 2

Government
  - Mayor (2020–25): Ansgar Mertens (CDU)

Area
  - Total: 140.54 km^{2} (54.26 sq mi)
- Elevation: 52–110 m (171–361 ft)

Population (2025-12-31)
  - Total: 25,039
  - Density: 178.16/km^{2} (461.44/sq mi)
- Time zone: UTC+01:00 (CET)
  - Summer (DST): UTC+02:00 (CEST)
- Postal codes: 59348
- Dialling codes: 02591
- Vehicle registration: COE, LH
- Website: www.luedinghausen.de

Lüdinghausen (German pronunciation: [lyːdɪŋˈhaʊzn̩]; Westphalian: Lünkhusen or Lünksel) is a town in district of Coesfeld in the state of North Rhine-Westphalia, Germany. It is located on the Dortmund-Ems Canal, approx. 25 km south-west of Münster.

== History ==
Lüdinghausen was founded in the thirteenth century and received its first city charter around 1308. On the first of january 1975 Seppenrade was officially designated as a district of Lüdinghausen.

== Population ==
Historical population

| Year | Pop. | ±% p.a. |
|---|---|---|
| 1965 | 17,113 | — |
| 1970 | 17,387 | +0.32% |
| 1975 | 17,346 | −0.05% |
| 1980 | 17,957 | +0.69% |
| 1985 | 18,374 | +0.46% |
| 1990 | 20,152 | +1.86% |
| 1995 | 21,569 | +1.37% |

| Year | Pop. | ±% p.a. |
|---|---|---|
| 2000 | 22,873 | +1.18% |
| 2005 | 24,097 | +1.05% |
| 2010 | 24,195 | +0.08% |
| 2015 | 24,263 | +0.06% |
| 2020 | 24,810 | +0.45% |
| 2025 | 25,039 | +0.18% |

Source: Landesdatabank Nordrhein-Westfalen

== Transportation ==
Lüdinghausen is situated at the Dortmund–Gronau railway, and has a train station (Lüdinghausen railway station). Flugplatz Borkenberge (Borkenberge Airport) (ICAO code: EDLB) is located in the Ludinghausen area.

== Notable places ==
Lüdinghausen is known for its three castles, Castle Luedinghausen, Kakesbeck Castle and Vischering Castle.

The town of Lüdinghausen includes the village of Seppenrade ([ˈzɛpn̩ʁɑːdə]), where the ammonite Parapuzosia seppenradensis was found in 1895. The name 'Seppenrade' likely derives from the German words 'Siepe' meaning a valley with a spring and 'Rade' meaning a forest clearing.

== Twin towns – sister cities ==
Lüdinghausen is twinned with:

- Nysa, Poland
- Taverny, France

== Notable people ==
- Jens Albert (born 1973), rapper
- Holger Blume (born 1973), sprinter
- Marc Blume (born 1973), sprinter
- Marie Theres Fögen (1946–2008), jurist and historian
- Franz Kamphaus (born 1932), Roman Catholic bishop
- Johannes Kriege (1859–1937), jurist and politician (DVP)
- Wiebke Muhsal (born 1986), politician (AfD)
- Hanna Orthmann (born 1998), volleyball player
- Amos Pieper (born 1998), footballer
- Bettina Schausten (born 1965), journalist
- Karin Schnaase (born 1985), badminton player
- Bernd Strasser (1936–2025), water polo player
- Heiner Thade (born 1942), modern penthalete
- Wilm Weppelmann (born 1957), artist
- Franz Wernekinck (1764–1839), physician and botanist
