= Franz Wernekinck =

German botanist (1764–1839)

Franz Wernekinck (19 February 1764 in Burg Vischering, now part of Lüdinghausen – 6 February 1839 in Münster) was a German medical doctor and botanist. He was the father of anatomist Friedrich Christian Gregor Wernekinck (1798–1835).

From 1788 he worked as a physician in Münster. From 1797 to 1822 he was a professor of natural history at the University of Münster, where he also served as director of its botanical garden. In 1802 he attained the title of Medicinalrath.

== Associated written works ==
- Icones plantarum sponte nascentium in episcopatu Monasteriensi, 1798.
- Franz Wernekinck, Arzt und Botaniker (1764 - 1839) und seine Pflanzenbilder aus dem Münsterland; by Kaja, Hans: Verlag: Münster: Aschendorff, 1995, (biography of Franz Wernekinck).
