= Dortmund–Gronau railway =

Railway line in Germany

Dortmund–Gronau
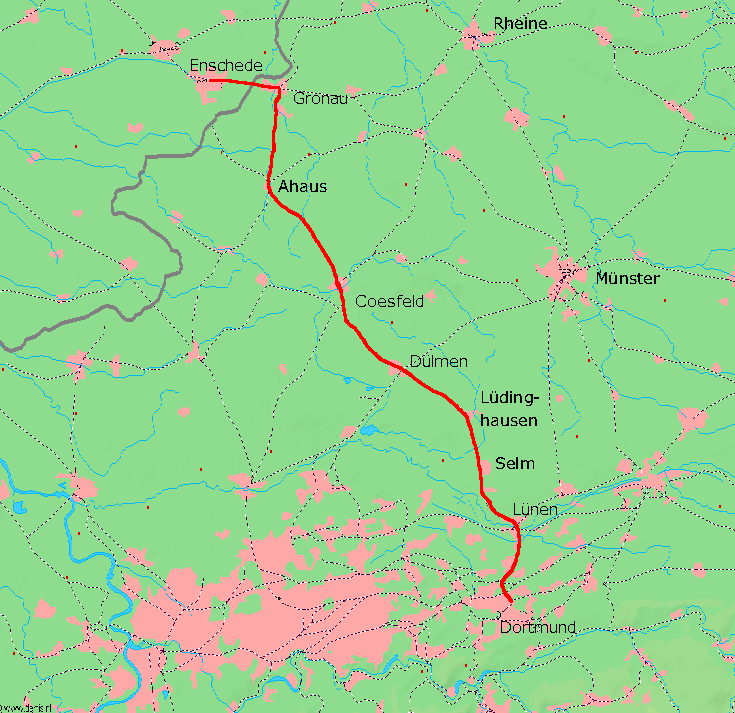

Overview
- Line number: 2111 (Dortmund–Dortmund-Eving); 2100 (Dortmund-Eving–Gronau)
- Locale: North Rhine-Westphalia, Germany and the Netherlands

Service
- Route number: 412

Technical
- Line length: 103 km (64 mi)
- Track gauge: 1,435 mm (4 ft 8 1/2 in) standard gauge
- Operating speed: 140 km/h (87.0 mph) (maximum)

The Dortmund–Gronau railway is an international railway connecting the eastern Ruhr district of Germany to Gronau, which was built by the Dortmund-Gronau-Enschede Railway Company.

== History ==
The Dortmund-Gronau-Enschede Railway Company (German: Dortmund-Gronau-Enscheder Eisenbahn-Gesellschaft, DGE) began to build its line from Dortmund DGE station (later called Dortmund East station) to the east of the central city. As a result, its line had to cross the original Dortmund–Hamm trunk line of the Cologne-Minden Railway Company (Cöln-Mindener Eisenbahn-Gesellschaft, CME).

The first section to Lünen Nord station was opened on 25 November 1874 for passenger trains; the first goods trains ran a week later. Six months later, the line reached Dulmen, where it crossed the Wanne-Eickel–Hamburg line (also a CME line) to reach Dülmen DGE station (later called Dülmen Ost (east) station), which was located north-west of the CME station.

The other parts of the line were opened at short intervals after each other. It reached Coesfeld on 1 August 1875 and Gronau on 30 September 1875, when the Münster–Enschede line of the Royal Westphalian Railway Company (KWE) was also opened to the station. The section of the Münster–Enschede line from Gronau to Enschede in the Netherlands was built in cooperation with the KWE and opened on 15 October 1875 and subsequently operated jointly.

With the opening of Duisburg–Quakenbrück railway by the Rhenish Railway Company four years later, Coesfeld station became an interchange station. At the beginning of the 20th century, the Empel-Rees–Münster line (the eastern part of which is called the Baumberge Railway) was opened, which also intersected at Coesfelder Station, making it the major railway junction of western Münsterland.

== Current situation ==
The section from Dortmund to Lünen is double track, electrified and classified as a main line.

The section from Lünen to Gronau is single track, non-electrified and has been classified as a branch line since 2007.

== Operations ==
The route is now served hourly by the RB 51 (Westmünsterland-Bahn) Regionalbahn service. Trains pass each other in Lüdinghausen, Coesfeld and Epe. Because of the single-track, services operating in the opposite direction and departing on the symmetry minute delay services by several minutes. RB 50 (Der Lüner) also runs hourly between Dortmund and Lünen towards Münster.

Services on the line were operated from 12 December 2004 until 10 December 2012 by Prignitzer Eisenbahn, operating with modern Bombardier Talent diesel multiple units. Previously services had been operated by DB Regio NRW with class 624 diesel multiple units and DB Regio Westfalen won the most recent contract and has operated it since 11 December 2012.

== Fares ==
Westfalen-Tarif

The line is located in the fare associations Rheinland-Tarif and Westfalen-Tarif.
