= Ochtrup station =

Railway station in Germany

Ochtrup

General information
- Location: Ochtrup, NRW; Germany
- Coordinates: 52.1205°N 7.1102°E
- Line: Münster–Enschede railway
- Platforms: 2

Construction
- Accessible: Yes

Other information
- Fare zone: Westfalentarif: 51741
- Website: www.bahnhof.de

Services
Preceding station	DB Regio NRW	Following station
Gronau (Westf) towards Enschede	RB 64	Metelen Land towards Münster Hbf
Location

Ochtrup (German: Bahnhof Ochtrup) is a railway station located in Ochtrup, Germany. The station is located on the Münster–Enschede railway. The train services are operated by Deutsche Bahn.

== Train services ==
The following services currently call at the station:

- Local service RB 64 Enschede - Gronau - Münster
