= Metelen Land station =

Railway station in Metelen, Germany

Metelen Land
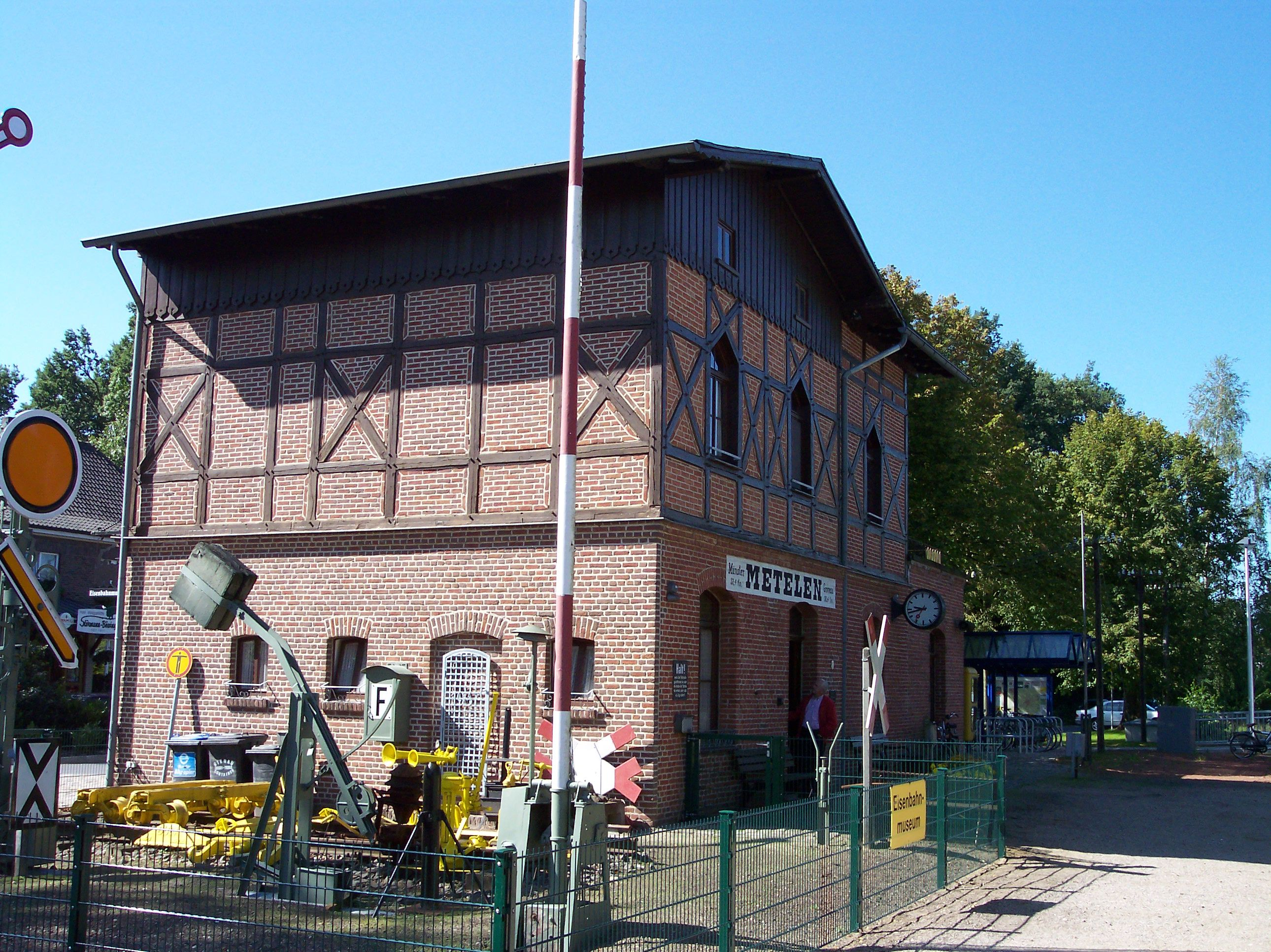
- Metelen Land Railway Museum

General information
- Location: Steinfurt, NRW; Germany
- Coordinates: 52°9′44″N 7°15′14″E
- Lines: Münster–Enschede (KBS 407); former Dorsten–Rheine (last KBS 284); former Burgsteinfurt–Borken
- Platforms: 1

Construction
- Accessible: Yes

Other information
- Station code: 4081
- DS100 code: EMTE
- Category: 6
- Fare zone: Westfalentarif: 51892
- Website: www.bahnhof.de

History
- Opened: 30 September 1875

Services
Preceding station	DB Regio NRW	Following station
Ochtrup towards Enschede	RB 64	Steinfurt-Burgsteinfurt towards Münster Hbf
Location

Metelen Land station is located in Metelen in the German state of North Rhine-Westphalia on the Münster–Enschede railway. The station is operated by the Metelen Land Railway Museum.

The station was opened by the Royal Westphalian Railway Company (Königlich-Westfälische Eisenbahn, KWE) on 30 September 1875, along with the Münster–Enschede railway. The station was originally called Metelen and received its current name on 1 October 1902.

Metelen Land station is served by the following Regionalbahn service:

Line	Line name	Route	Operator	Frequency
RB 64	Euregio-Bahn	Enschede – Gronau (Westf) – Metelen Land – Steinfurt-Burgsteinfurt – Altenberge – Münster (Westf) Zentrum Nord – Münster (Westf)	DB Regio NRW	60 min

== Metelen Land Railway Museum ==
The station is operated by the Eisenbahn-Interessengemeinschaft Metelen e. V. (Metelen railway community of interest, EIG). It includes, among other things, the Metelen Land Railway Museum (German: Eisenbahnmuseum Metelen Land, which has a uniform and hat collection. The station's fully functional mechanical signal box, a section of railway track with a crossover, a local and long distance barrier, homemade hand-operated inspection trolley, a salon car, workshop wagons, track maintenance equipment, a ticket printing machine, a weighing scale with card issuance, an industrial diesel locomotive and model railways can also be viewed.
