= Metelen =

- Town
- Coat of arms

- Location of Metelen within Steinfurt district
- Interactive map of Metelen
- Location within Germany Location within North Rhine-Westphalia
- Coordinates: 52°08′40″N 7°12′43″E
- Country: Germany
- State: North Rhine-Westphalia
- Admin. region: Münster
- District: Steinfurt

Government
  - Mayor (2020–25): Gregor Krabbe (CDU)

Area
  - Total: 40.23 km^{2} (15.53 sq mi)
- Elevation: 56 m (184 ft)

Population (2025-12-31)
  - Total: 6,540
  - Density: 163/km^{2} (421/sq mi)
- Time zone: UTC+01:00 (CET)
  - Summer (DST): UTC+02:00 (CEST)
- Postal codes: 48629
- Dialling codes: 02556
- Vehicle registration: ST
- Website: www.metelen.de

Metelen is a municipality in North Rhine-Westphalia, Germany. It is located on the river Vechte in the district of Steinfurt. Metelen Land station is located on the Münster–Enschede railway and has an hourly train service to Münster in one direction and to Enschede in the other direction.

== History ==
The town history dates back to 889 AD, when it was first mentioned in an official document.

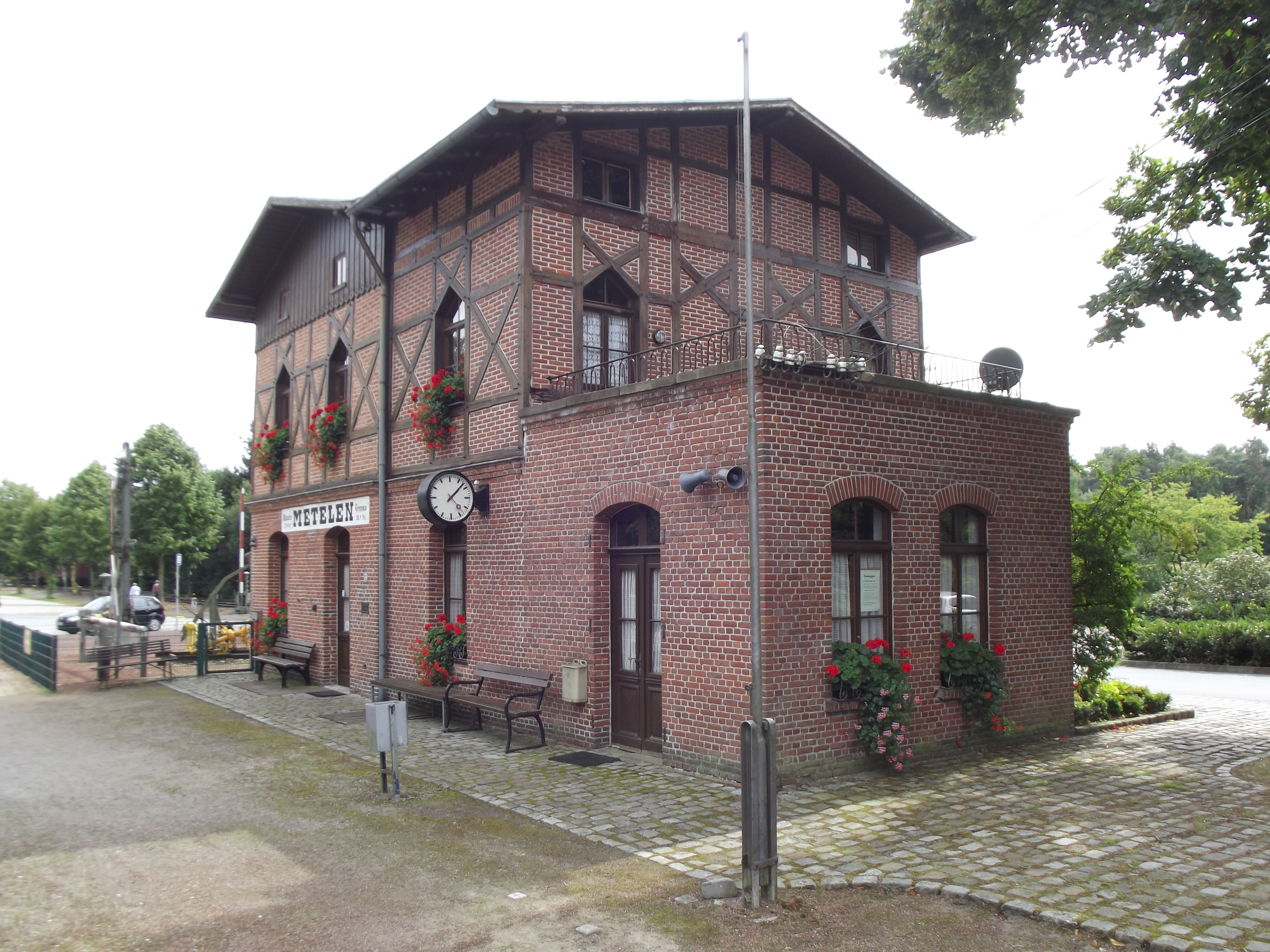
Metelen Land Railway Museum

== Population ==
Historical population

Year	Pop.	±% p.a.
1965	4,783	—
1970	5,080	+1.21%
1975	5,464	+1.47%
1980	5,771	+1.10%
1985	5,938	+0.57%
1990	5,904	−0.11%
1995	6,177	+0.91%

Year	Pop.	±% p.a.
2000	6,328	+0.48%
2005	6,446	+0.37%
2010	6,329	−0.37%
2015	6,461	+0.41%
2020	6,363	−0.31%
2025	6,540	+0.55%

Source: Landesdatabank Nordrhein-Westfalen

== Notable places ==
Metelen is known for its aviary and, as the whole Münsterland region, as a great cycling area.

== Transport ==
Metelen Land statin is located along the RB64 (Münster–Enschede railway) from Münster (Westf) Hbf to Enschede station. Metelen is located in the area of the fare association Westfalen-Tarif.

== People from Metelen ==
- Arnold Kock (1822–1879), businessman
- Anne Daubenspeck-Focke (born 1922), sculptor
- Hermann Focke (born 1924), sculptor and painter
- Hans Tietmeyer (1931–2016), economist
- Klemens Tietmeyer (1937–1993), table tennis player
- Elisabeth Tietmeyer (born 1960), ethnologin
- Rolf Morrien (born 1972), author
