= Glanerbrug railway station =

Railway station in the Netherlands

Glanerbrug
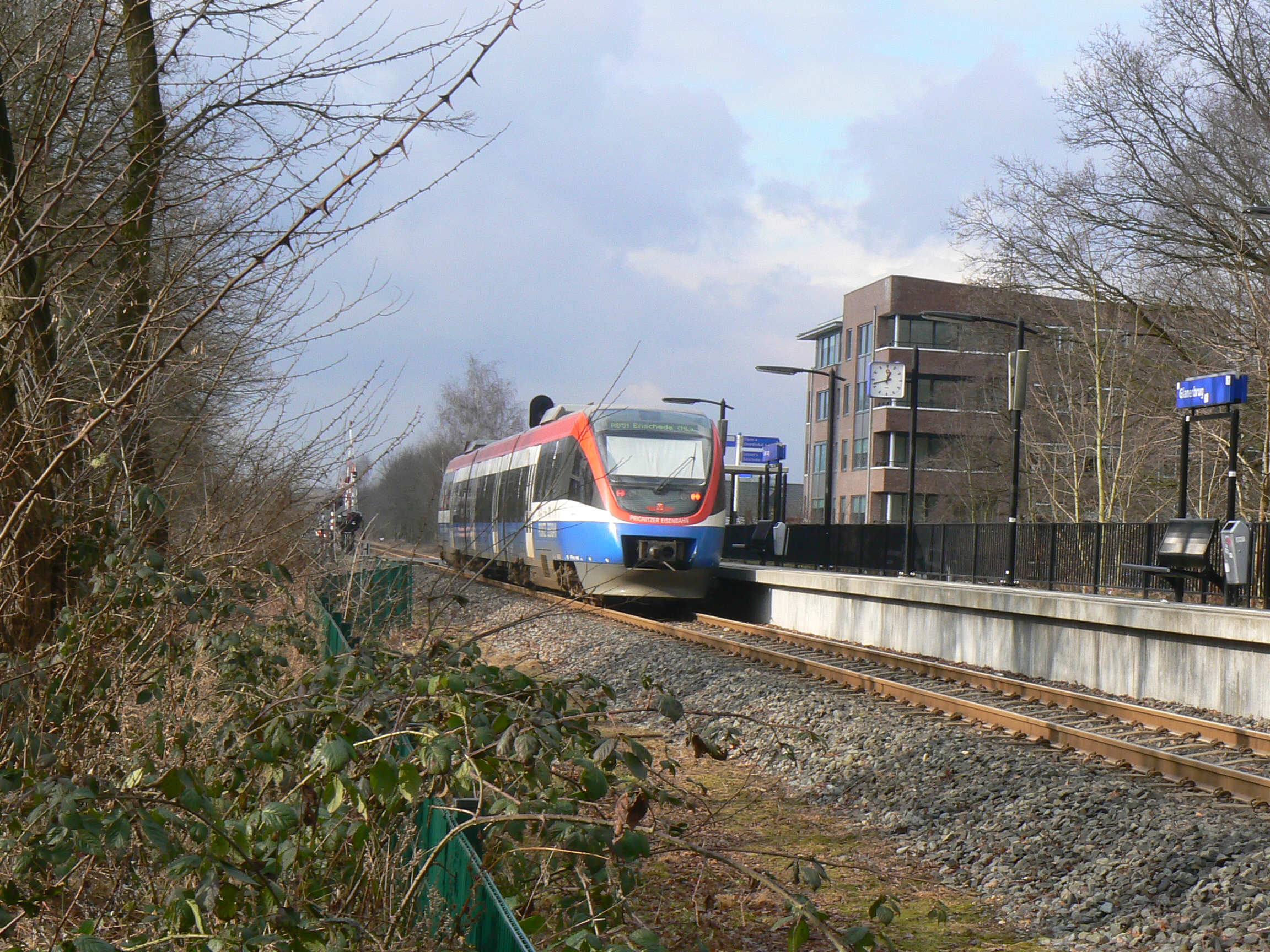

General information
- Location: Netherlands
- Coordinates: 52°13′07″N 6°58′26″E
- Lines: Zutphen–Glanerbeek railway Münster–Enschede railway

Services
Preceding station	DB Regio NRW	Following station
Enschede De Eschmarke towards Enschede	RB 51	Gronau (Westf) towards Dortmund Hbf
Enschede De Eschmarke towards Enschede	RB 64	Gronau (Westf) towards Münster Hbf
Location
- Location within Netherlands

Glanerbrug is a railway station close to the border of Germany in Glanerbrug, Netherlands. The station opened on 18 November 2001 and is on the Zutphen–Glanerbeek railway. Between the 1972 and 2001, the passenger service to Germany stopped as the line was closed. The line to Gronau was reopened in 2001. The station is operated by ProRail, but all services are operated by Deutsche Bahn.

The station was originally opened in 1865 as Glanerbeek and closed in 1972.

Route	Service type	Operator	Notes
Enschede - Gronau - Coesfeld - Lünen - Dortmund	"Regionalbahn"	DB Regio NRW	1x per hour
Enschede - Gronau - Münster	"Regionalbahn"	DB Regio NRW	1x per hour

== Bus services ==
There is no bus service at this station. The nearest bus stop is Tolstraat, 500m south of the station.
