= Ochtrup =

Town in Germany

- Town
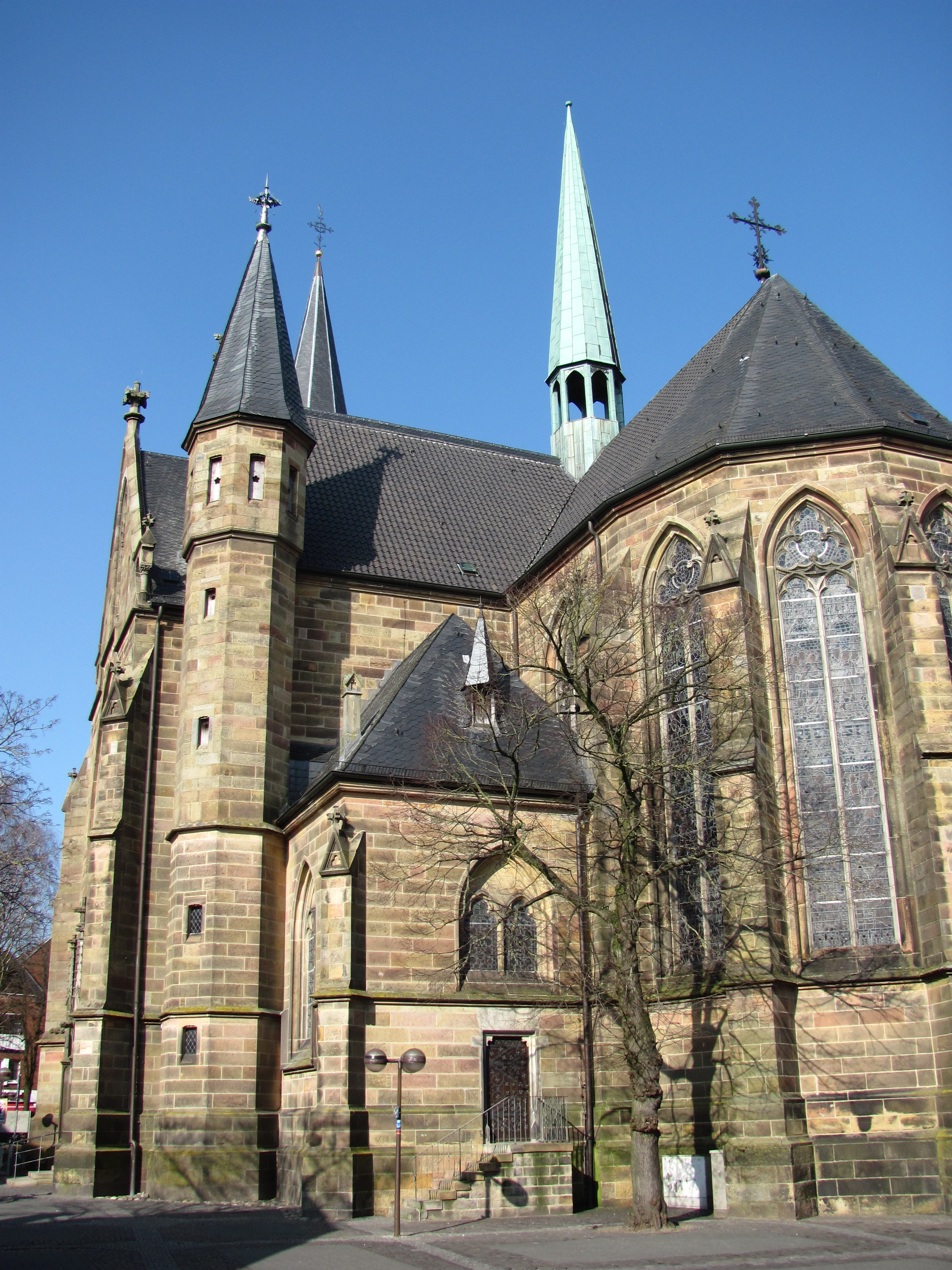
- Church of Saint Lambert

- Coat of arms

- Location of Ochtrup within Steinfurt district
- Interactive map of Ochtrup
- Location within Germany Location within North Rhine-Westphalia
- Coordinates: 52°12′20″N 7°11′25″E
- Country: Germany
- State: North Rhine-Westphalia
- Admin. region: Münster
- District: Steinfurt
- Subdivisions: 3

Government
  - Mayor (2020–25): Christa Lenderich (Ind.)

Area
  - Total: 105.63 km^{2} (40.78 sq mi)
- Elevation: 55 m (180 ft)

Population (2025-12-31)
  - Total: 20,358
  - Density: 192.73/km^{2} (499.17/sq mi)
- Time zone: UTC+01:00 (CET)
  - Summer (DST): UTC+02:00 (CEST)
- Postal codes: 48607
- Dialling codes: 02553
- Vehicle registration: ST
- Website: www.ochtrup.de

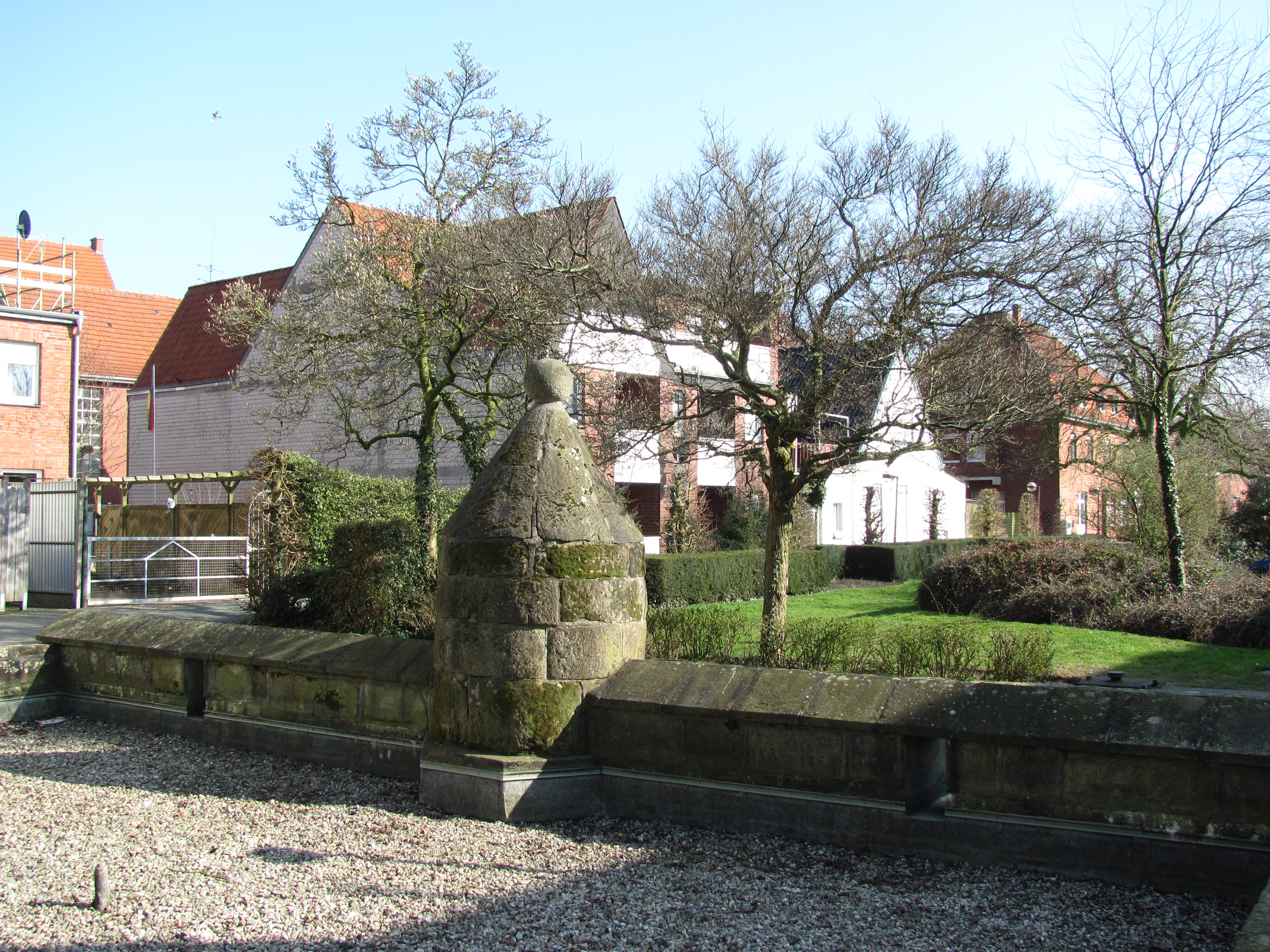
Stüwwenkopp weir dating from 1593

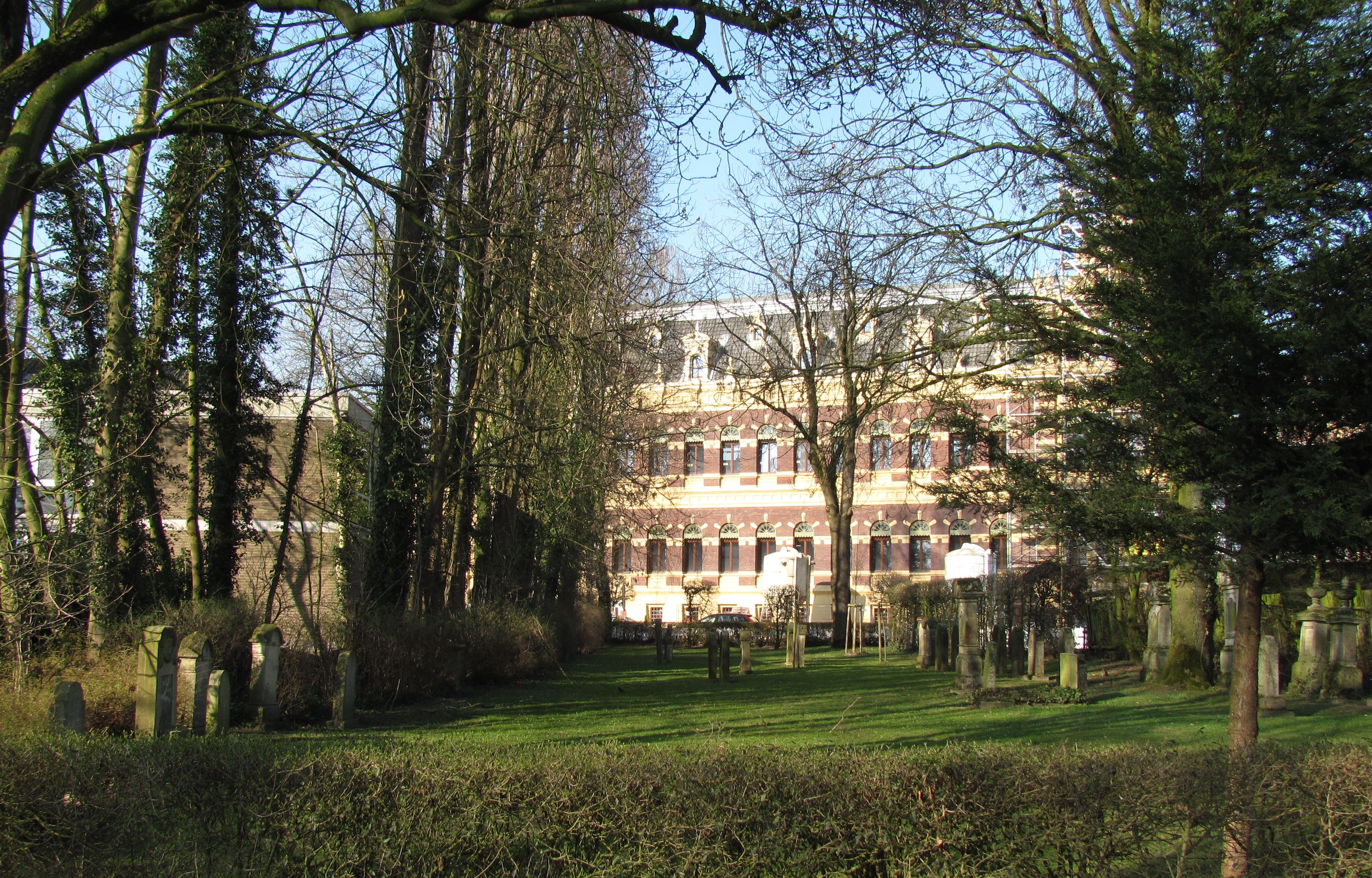
Jewish Cemetery

Ochtrup (German: [ˈɔxtʁʊp]) is a town in the district of Steinfurt, in North Rhine-Westphalia, Germany. It is situated approximately 20 km west of Rheine and 20 km east of Enschede.

== History ==
An early mention of the town was „Ohtepe“ (the eastern Epe or Ostepe) in the year 1143. A Christian church was established there in 1203.

Between November 25 and November 30, 2005, the town was often off the German power grid, and was the topic of national news. The cause was a heavy snow storm with very wet snow. The power poles and cables between Gronau and Ochtrup were encrusted with a thick layer of ice. Due to the increased weight and the heavy storm most power poles toppled. Emergency generators from all regions of Germany were installed and operated in the following days and weeks. Dairy farmers were economically impacted as were other companies in the area. The collapse of the power poles, even today, is not completely understood. Some were 65 years old and rusted, but some were newer and constructed with special steel. Politicians in North Rhine-Westphalia blamed the power company, RWE for failure to replace older poles.

== Population ==
Historical population

Year	Pop.	±% p.a.
1965	16,026	—
1970	16,031	+0.01%
1975	16,418	+0.48%
1980	16,488	+0.09%
1985	16,724	+0.28%
1990	17,460	+0.87%
1995	18,176	+0.81%

Year	Pop.	±% p.a.
2000	18,879	+0.76%
2005	19,380	+0.53%
2010	19,430	+0.05%
2015	19,599	+0.17%
2020	19,673	+0.08%
2025	20,358	+0.69%

Source: Landesdatabank Nordrhein-Westfalen

== Sights ==
- The pottery museum of Ochtrup is in the house of an old pottery family whose name was Eiling. The authentic furniture shows the visitor how people lived in the 19th and the 20th century. The oldest objects dating from the 14th /15th century are restored Blackwood ware. The “Ochtruper Nachtigall” and the “Siebenhenkeltopf” are the most interesting objects. In the past, the “Siebenhenkeltopf” was a chamber pot with seven identical handles.
- St. Lamberti Church is a Catholic church in a neogothic style which was inaugurated in 1873.
- Stüwwenkopp dating from 1593 is an old weir in the town center which was a part of the medieval defensive wall of Ochtrup. Originally, Ochtrup was a village which developed around Saint Lamberti Church. In the Middle Ages, however, Ochtrup was transformed into a fortification surrounded by a moat and a wall. The dimension of the fort can still be seen on the present town maps as its borders were formed by the streets Nordwall, Ostwall, Südwall and Westwall which still surround the town center. The German word Wall means moat. Ochtrup as a fortification was meant to defend the trade road between Rheine and Münster, and as such the town was attacked and conquered various times, e.g. in the Thirty Years' War.
- The Jewish Cemetery of Ochtrup is in the Eastern part of the town. The oldest tomb dates from 1824.

== Twin Towns ==
Ochtrup is twinned with:

- Valverde del Camino (Huelva, Spain) -- since 1991

== Transport ==
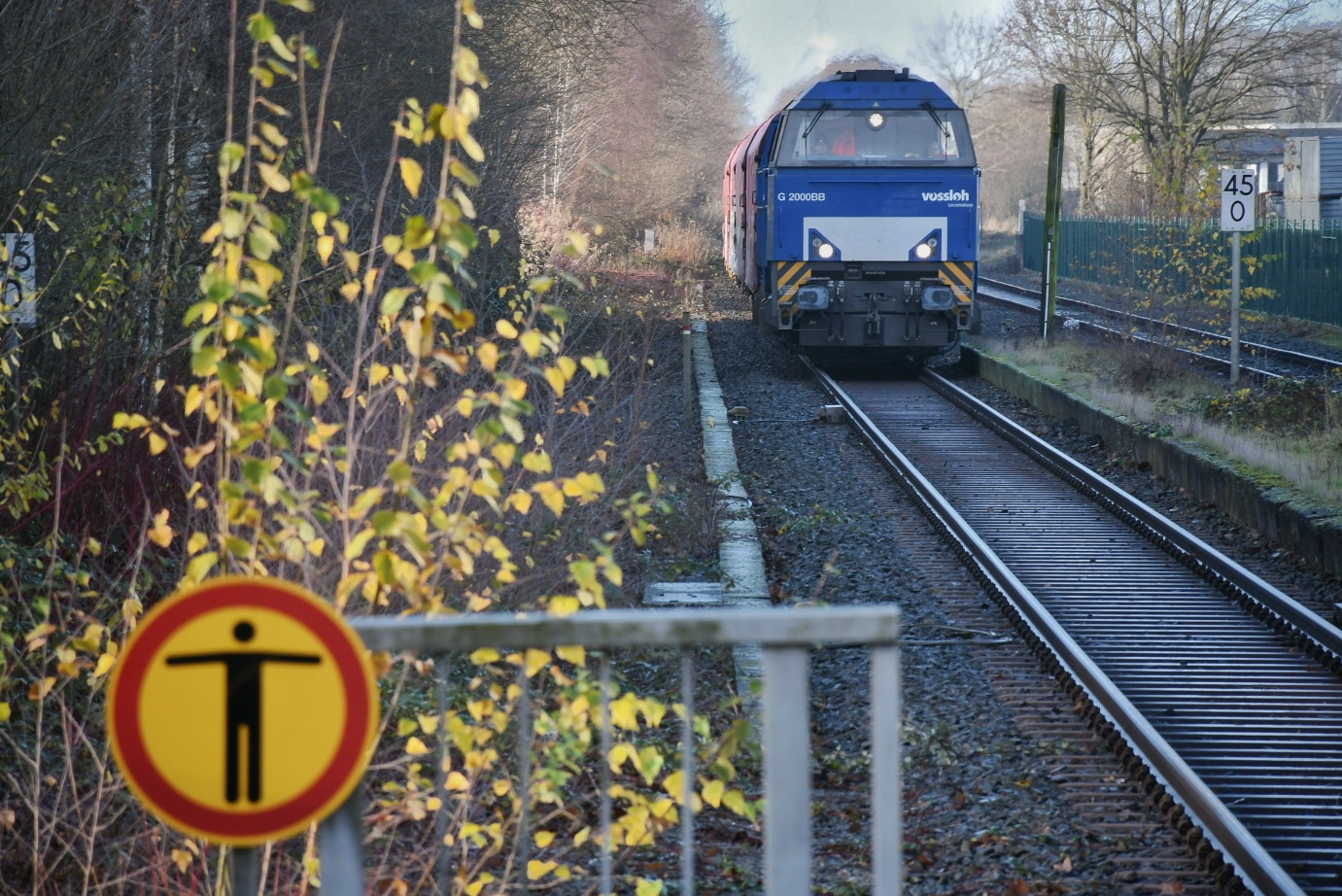
Fright train passing through Ochtrup station

Ochtrup train station is served by line RB64 (Münster–Enschede railway) from Muenster (Westf) Hbf to Enschede station. Ochtrup is located in the area of the fare association Westfalen-Tarif.
