= Steinfurt-Burgsteinfurt station =

Railway station in Steinfurt, Germany

Steinfurt-Burgsteinfurt
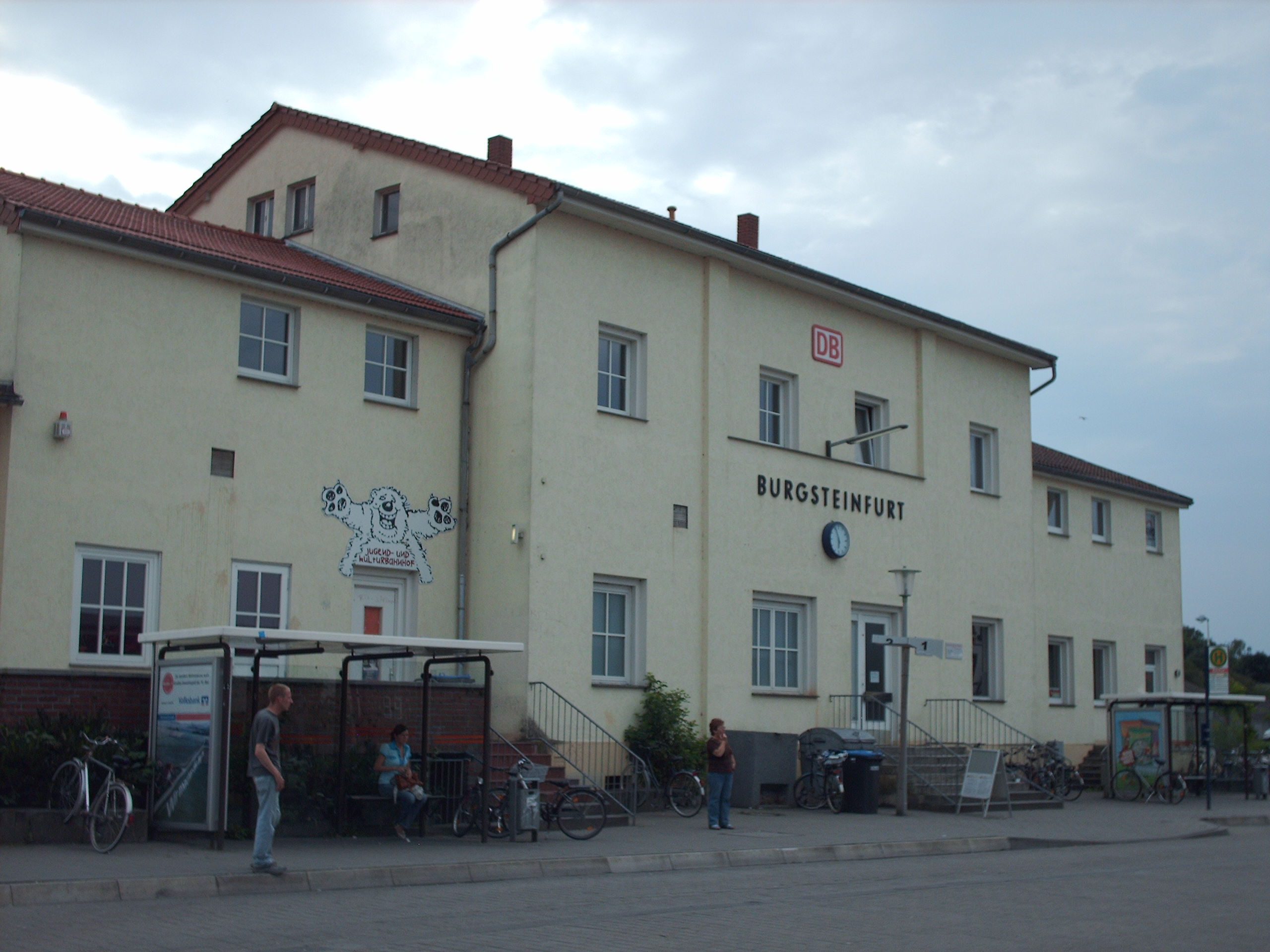

General information
- Location: Steinfurt, NRW; Germany
- Coordinates: 52°8′52″N 7°19′47″E
- Lines: Münster–Enschede (KBS 407); former Dorsten–Rheine (last KBS 284); former Burgsteinfurt–Borken
- Platforms: 2

Construction
- Accessible: Yes

Other information
- Station code: 997
- DS100 code: EBFT
- Category: 6
- Fare zone: Westfalentarif: 51731
- Website: www.bahnhof.de

History
- Opened: 30 September 1875

Services
Preceding station	DB Regio NRW	Following station
Metelen Land towards Enschede	RB 64	Steinfurt-Grottenkamp towards Münster Hbf
Location

Steinfurt-Burgsteinfurt station is the main station of the town of Steinfurt in western Munsterland in the German state of North Rhine-Westphalia and is located in the district of Burgsteinfurt. The station is a former railway junction on the Münster–Enschede railway. The Coesfeld–Rheine railway and the Borken–Steinfurt railway are closed and largely dismantled.

== History ==
In 1870, the Münster-Enschede Railway Company received a concession to build a line from Münster to Enschede. When it became insolvent in 1874, the Royal Westphalian Railway Company (Königlich-Westfälische Eisenbahn, KWE) took it over and continued its construction. On 30 September 1875, Burgsteinfurt station was opened together with the line.

The Wanne-Eickel–Hamburg railway of the Cologne-Minden Railway Company was of high national importance and the Rhenish Railway Company planned its Duisburg–Quakenbrück railway to compete with it. Burgsteinfurt station became a junction station with the completion of this line on 1 July 1879. The Rhenish line crossed the KWE line south of Burgsteinfurt station.

Finally the line from Borken of the Westfälische Landes-Eisenbahn (Westphalian Land Railway, WLE) was opened to Burgsteinfurt on 1 October 1902.

As a result of the Second World War, operations on several sections came to a halt. Rheine station was completely destroyed in an air raid on 5 October 1944 and bridges were blown up in Oberhausen and Dorsten. Traffic across the Dutch border to Enschede was closed from 1940 to 1951 and again from 1981 to 2001.

On the WLE line to Borken, passenger services were restricted to only semi-fast trains after only 60 years of operations on 30 September 1962 and then stopped completely on 27 September 1975. The transport of freight between Steinfurt and Ahaus had already been abandoned on 31 December 1972 and the line was immediately dismantled after the final closure of the line on 31 March 1988.

After the closure of passenger services on the northern section of the Duisburg–Quakenbruck line from Rheine on 31 May 1969 and on the section south of Dorsten in 1960, operations also ended on the section between Coesfeld and Rheine on 28 September 1984.

The transport of freight between Horstmar and St. Arnold was abandoned in the mid-1980s. The line between Lutum and St. Arnold was officially closed on 1 January 1996, so that the station is no longer a railway junction. Freight operations at the station ended on 1 May 1996.

As a result of a local government reform in North Rhine-Westphalia, the formerly independent towns of Steinfurt and Borghorst were merged as the town of Steinfurt on 1 January 1975, but the station was not renamed Steinfurt-Burgsteinfurt until the timetable change on 12 December 2004.

The dismantling of the Rhenish line between Steinfurt and St. Arnold started on 30 September 2005. Of the four former signal boxes, two have already been demolished, the Bn signal box on the Rhenish line and the Bmf signal box, which was located on the former middle platform. The two signal boxes on the Enschede line (the Bf signal box to the south and the Bw signal box to the north of the station) are still standing, but are out of service. Since 26 October 2008, signalling and points at the station have been remotely controlled from the electronic signalling centre at Coesfeld (Westf) station.

== Rail services ==
Steinfurt-Burgsteinfurt station is served by the following Regionalbahn service:

Line	Line name	Route	Operator	Frequency
RB 64	Euregio-Bahn	Enschede – Gronau (Westf) – Steinfurt-Burgsteinfurt – Altenberge – Münster (Westf) Zentrum Nord – Münster (Westf)	DB Regio NRW	60 min

The Regionalbahn service on the section between Munster and Gronau was closed on 24 May 1998. The service has operated to Enschede since 18 November 2001. DB Regio NRW won the contract for operating the service for a further 15 years from December 2011.

The station is located in the area of the fare association Westfalen-Tarif
