= Gronau railway station =

Gronau railway station may refer to

- Gronau (Westf) railway station in North Rhine-Westphalia, Germany
- Bad Vilbel-Gronau railway station in Bad Vilbel, Hesse, Germany
