= Rob Groener =

Dutch footballer, manager, and agent

Personal information
- Full name: Robert Groener
- Date of birth: 19 December 1945 (age 80)
- Place of birth: Glanerbrug, Netherlands
- Position: Defender

Youth career
- DOS '19

Senior career*
Years	Team	Apps	(Gls)
1968–1971	Heracles	66	(1)

Managerial career
- 1972–1974: Twente (fitness coach)
- 1974–1978: Quick '20
- 1978–1979: Suriname
- 1979–1981: Quick '20
- 1981–1982: Twente
- 1983–1985: Netherlands Antilles
- 1985–1989: Quick '20
- 1989–1992: VfL Herzlake
- 1992–1994: Emmen (director)
- 1994–1995: Cambuur (director)
- 1996–1998: Heracles (director)
- * Club domestic league appearances and goals as of 20 December 2015 ‡ National team caps and goals as of 20 December 2015

Rob Groener (born 19 December 1945) is a former Dutch football manager and player who is currently a players' agent.

As a player, he played for SC Heracles competing in the Dutch Eredivisie from 1962 to 1966. As a manager, he headed FC Twente, Suriname national team, the Netherlands Antilles national team, Quick '20, and VfL Herzlake in Germany.

== Career ==
Groener grew up in Denekamp, where he joined the local amateur club DOS '19. He was selected to play for the Netherlands amateur national football team, and was ultimately signed to nearby SC Heracles from Almelo with whom he played in the Eredivisie from 1962 to 1966. On 7 February 1971 his playing career was brought to a halt in a match against SC Heerenveen, where Groener suffered a double leg break, ending his career as a player.

== Managerial career ==
Following his injury, Groener took a position as a fitness coach for FC Twente. From 1974 to 1978 he was the manager of Quick '20. In 1978 Groener finished his studies to become a A-level certified football coach, taking the managerial position of the Suriname national team. He successfully lead the country to its first CFU Championship in 1978. In 1979, he returned to the Netherlands taking a job as manager of Quick '20 once more. In June 1981, Groener signed a 1-year contract with FC Twente as the successor of Hennie Hollink. His contract was extended for one more year in February 1982. Groener finished the season in 12th place, and without showing any signs of improvement the following season, he was released in November 1982 with Spitz Kohn taking over as manager the team relegated the following season.

From 1983 to 1985, Groener returned to the Caribbean as manager of the Netherlands Antilles. Upon his return to the Netherlands, he managed Quick '20 once more, followed by a stint as manager of German team VfL Herzlake competing in the Oberliga. In 1992, he became the director for Dutch club FC Emmen, followed by SC Cambuur and finally Heracles Almelo where he was fired in 1998.

He later became active as a players' agent representing the likes of Marko Arnautović, Samuel Armenteros, Peter Niemeyer, Georgios Samaras and manager Jan de Jonge amongst others. He was named Quick '20 manager of the century.

== Honours ==
=== International ===
Suriname

- CFU Championship (1): 1978
