= Hermann Scheipers =

Hermann Scheipers (Ochtrup, July 24, 1913 – June 2, 2016) was a German Catholic priest who was imprisoned at the Dachau concentration camp during the Nazi era, between 1941 and 1945. During his visit to Germany in September 2011, Pope Benedict XVI met with Scheipers in Erfurt.

== Biography ==
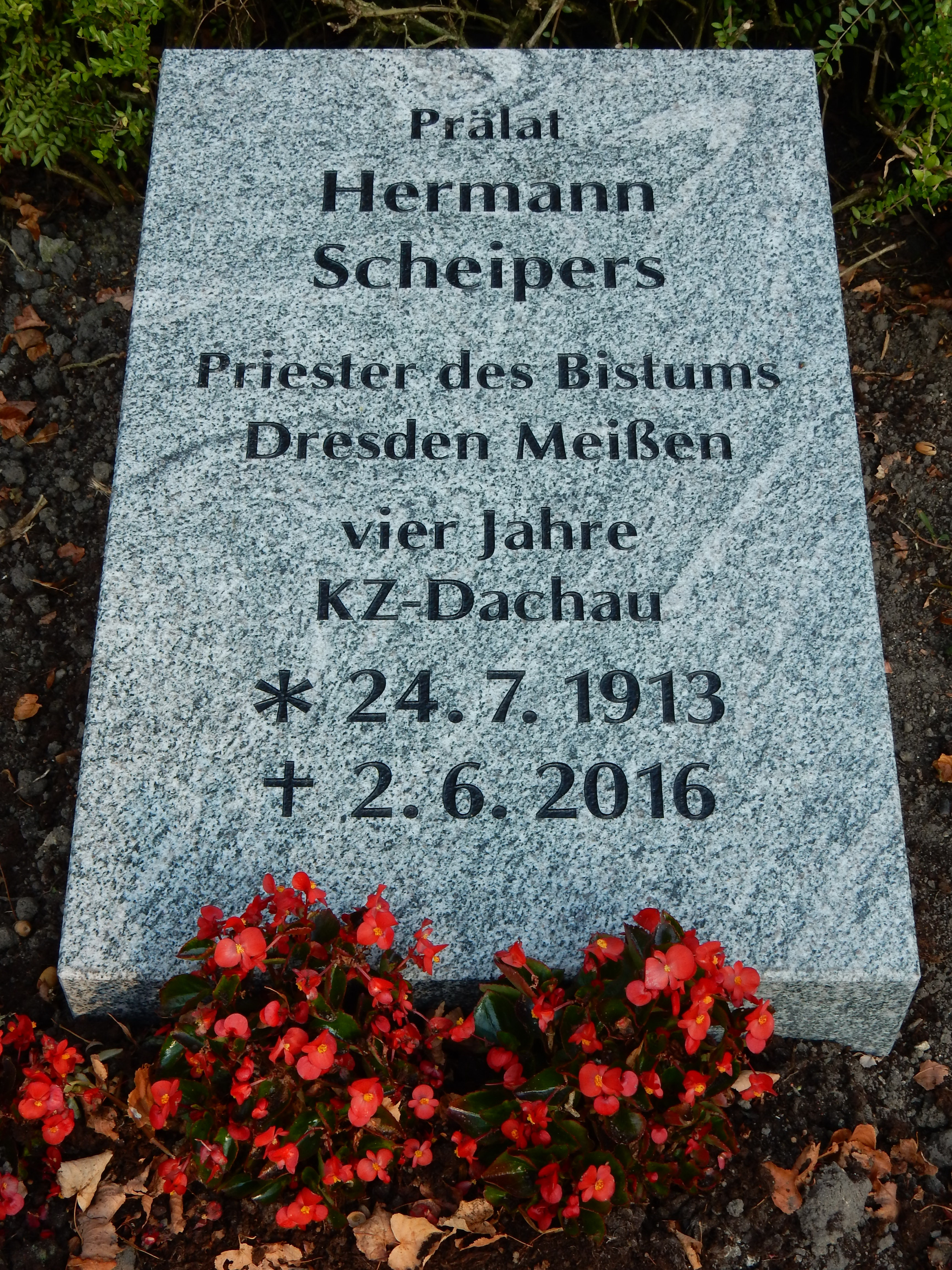
The grave of Hermann Scheipers at the Alte Maate cemetery in Ochtrup.

After studying theology at the University of Münster, Scheipers was ordained a priest in 1937 by Bishop Petrus Legge; three years later, he was imprisoned for six months by Nazi German authorities alongside Polish political prisoners sentenced to forced labor in Leipzig.

There, the Gestapo offered him freedom in exchange for renouncing his beliefs, an agreement he refused. He continued to minister as a priest to the other Catholic prisoners, and in 1941 he was sent to Dachau, where most of the dissident Catholics of the Third Reich had been interned, under the accusation of being an enemy of the state.

On April 27, 1945—two days before U.S. forces liberated the Dachau concentration camp—Scheipers survived a death march. After recovering his health, he returned in 1946 to the Diocese of Dresden-Meissen (then part of the German Democratic Republic), where he soon came into conflict with the Socialist Unity Party of Germany. He served as a priest in Dresden, Berggießhübel, Dresden-Johannstadt, Freital, Wilsdruff, and Bautzen. From 1960 until his return to Münster in 1983, he was the parish priest of St. Mary's in Schirgiswalde.
