= Hollink =

Hollink is a surname. Notable people with the surname include:

- Hennie Hollink (1931–2018), Dutch footballer and manager
- Rob Hollink (born 1962), Dutch poker player
