= Enschede De Eschmarke railway station =

Railway station in the Netherlands

Enschede de Eschmarke
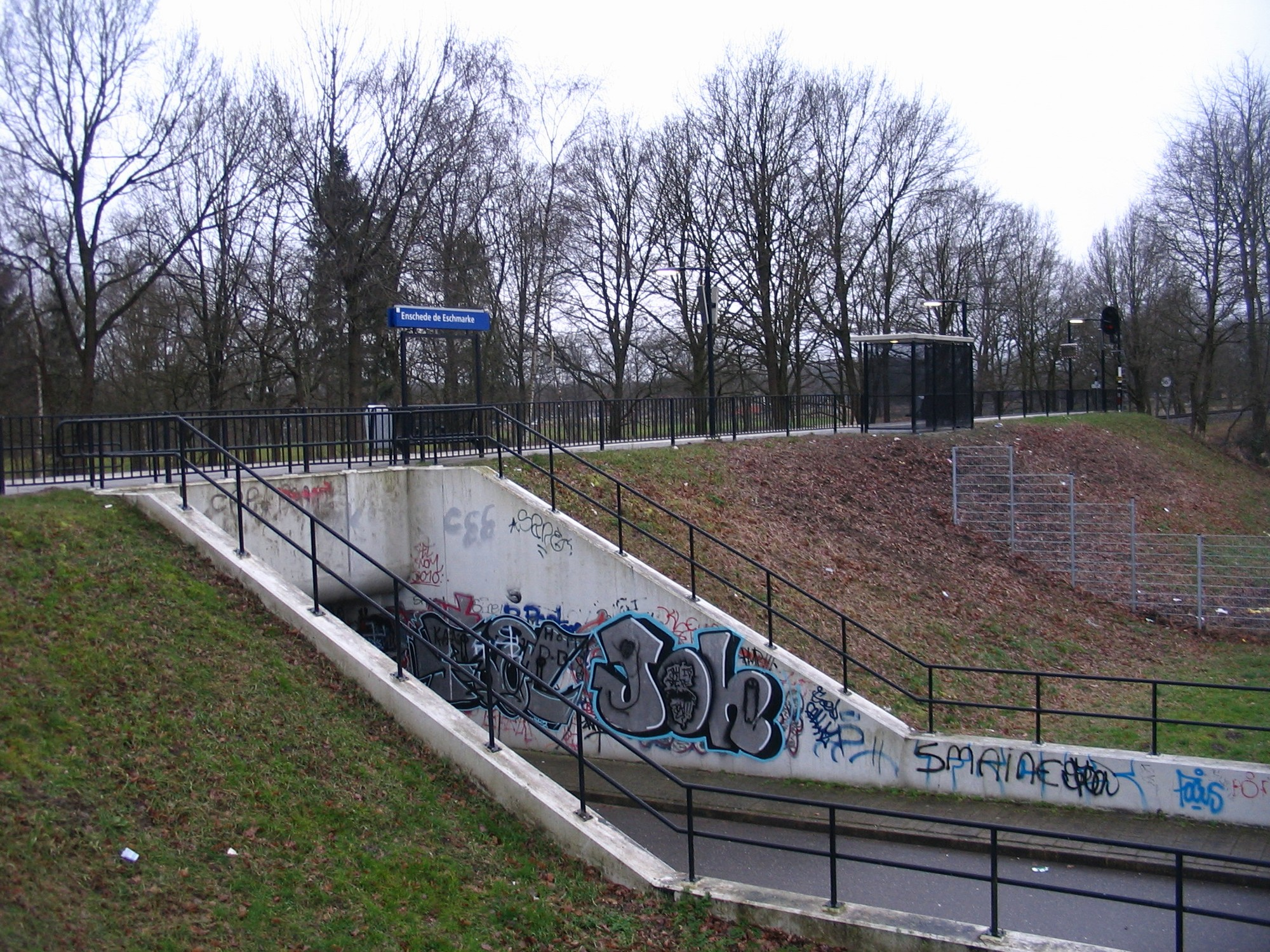

General information
- Location: Netherlands
- Coordinates: 52°13′16″N 6°57′04″E
- Line: Zutphen–Glanerbeek railway

Services
Preceding station	DB Regio NRW	Following station
Enschede Terminus	RB 51	Glanerbrug towards Dortmund Hbf
Enschede Terminus	RB 64	Glanerbrug towards Münster Hbf
Location
- Location within Netherlands

Enschede de Eschmarke is a railway station in eastern Enschede, Netherlands. The station opened on 18 November 2001 and is on the Zutphen–Glanerbeek railway. The connection to Gronau was reopened in 2001. All rail services are operated by Deutsche Bahn.

According to the 2005 RailPro survey in the Netherlands, this station is the least used station in the Netherlands, with an average of just 57 passengers per day.

== Train services ==
Route	Service type	Operator	Notes
Enschede - Gronau - Coesfeld - Lünen - Dortmund	"Regionalbahn"	DB Regio NRW	1x per hour
Enschede - Gronau - Münster	"Regionalbahn"	DB Regio NRW	1x per hour

=== Bus services ===
There is no bus service at this station. The nearest bus stop is Dolphia, 500m south of the station (in the Gronausestraat).

== Gallery ==
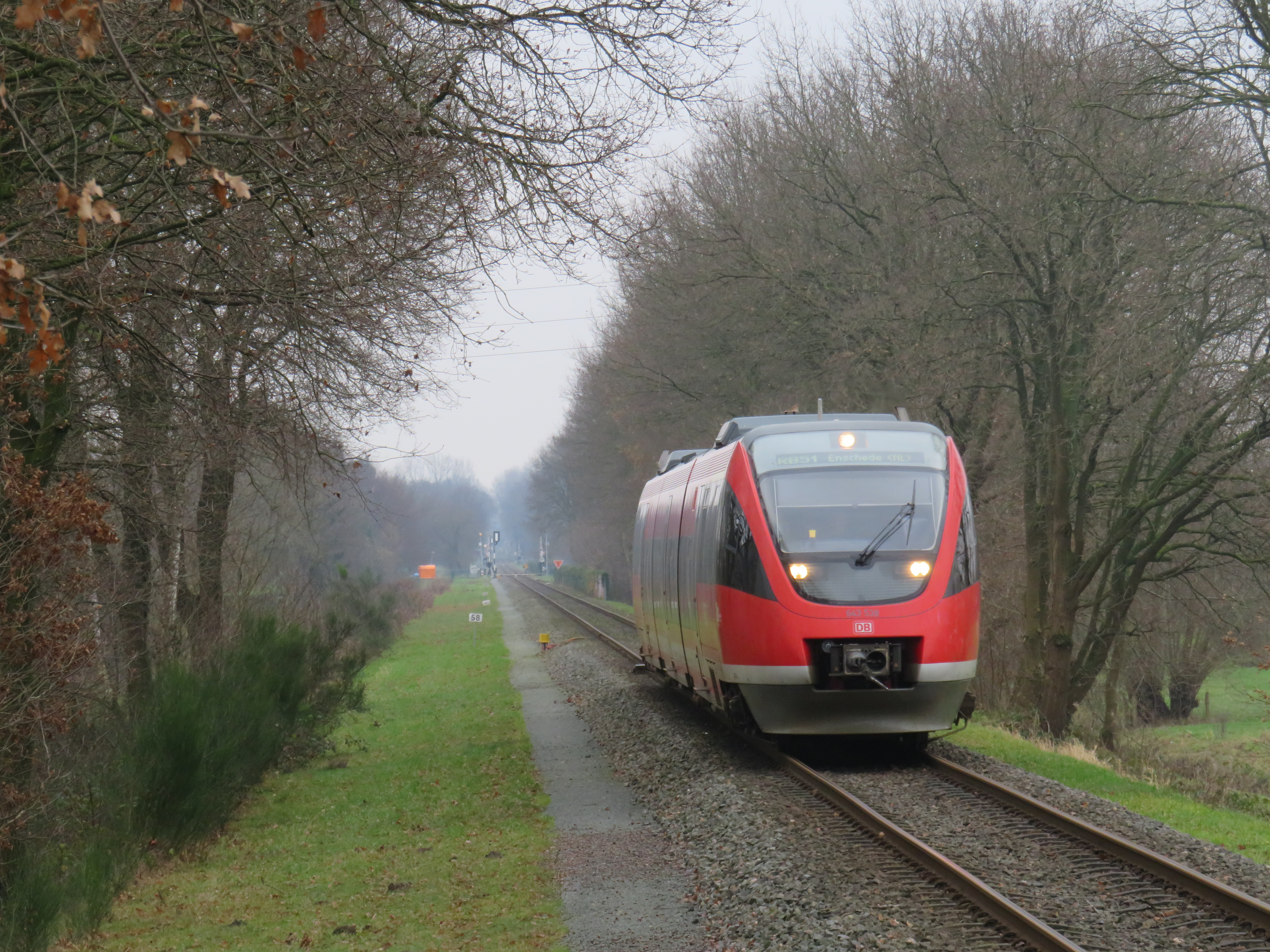
A DB Talent DMU entering the station

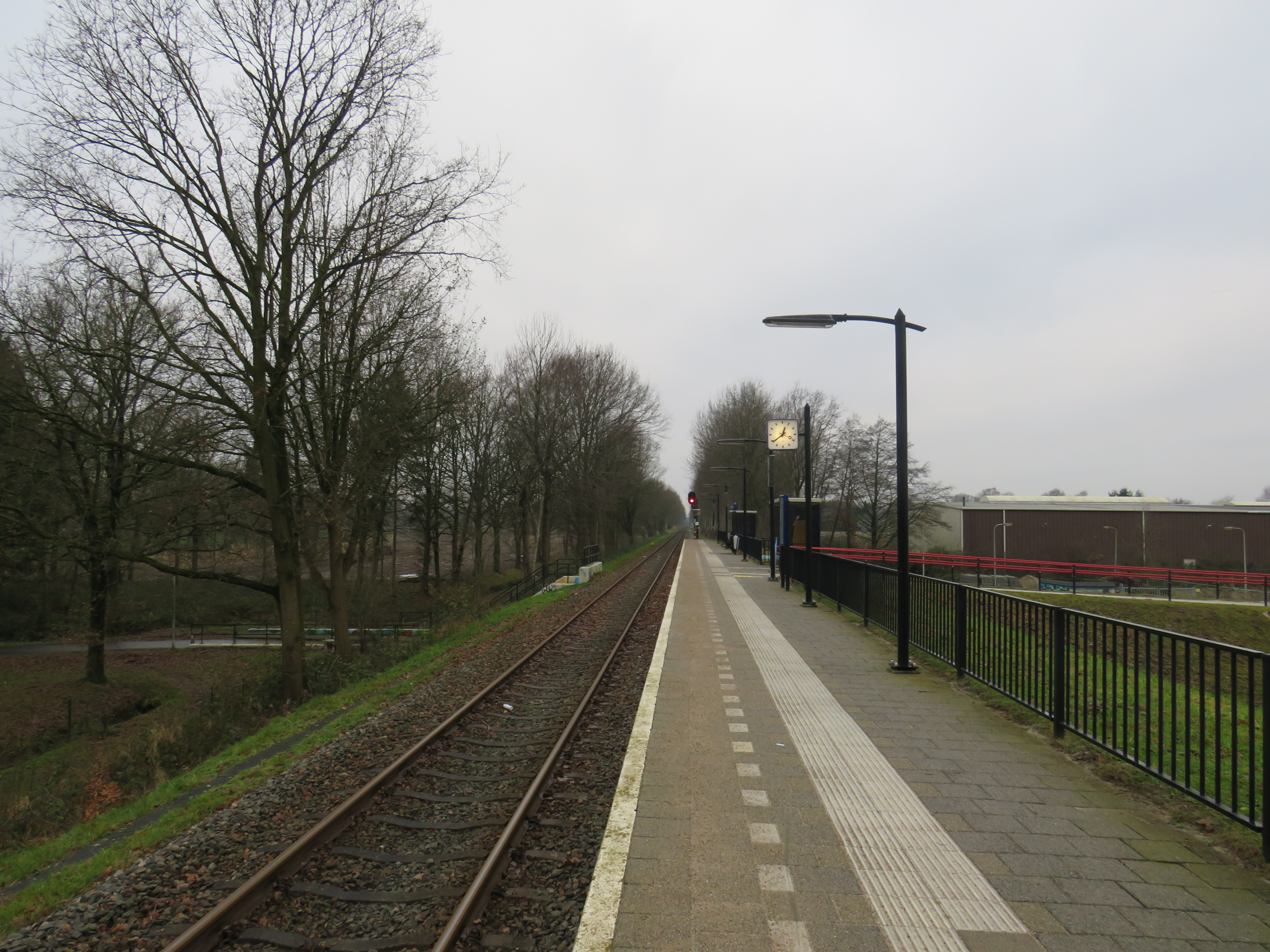
View over the platform
