= Bert Schierbeek =

Dutch writer

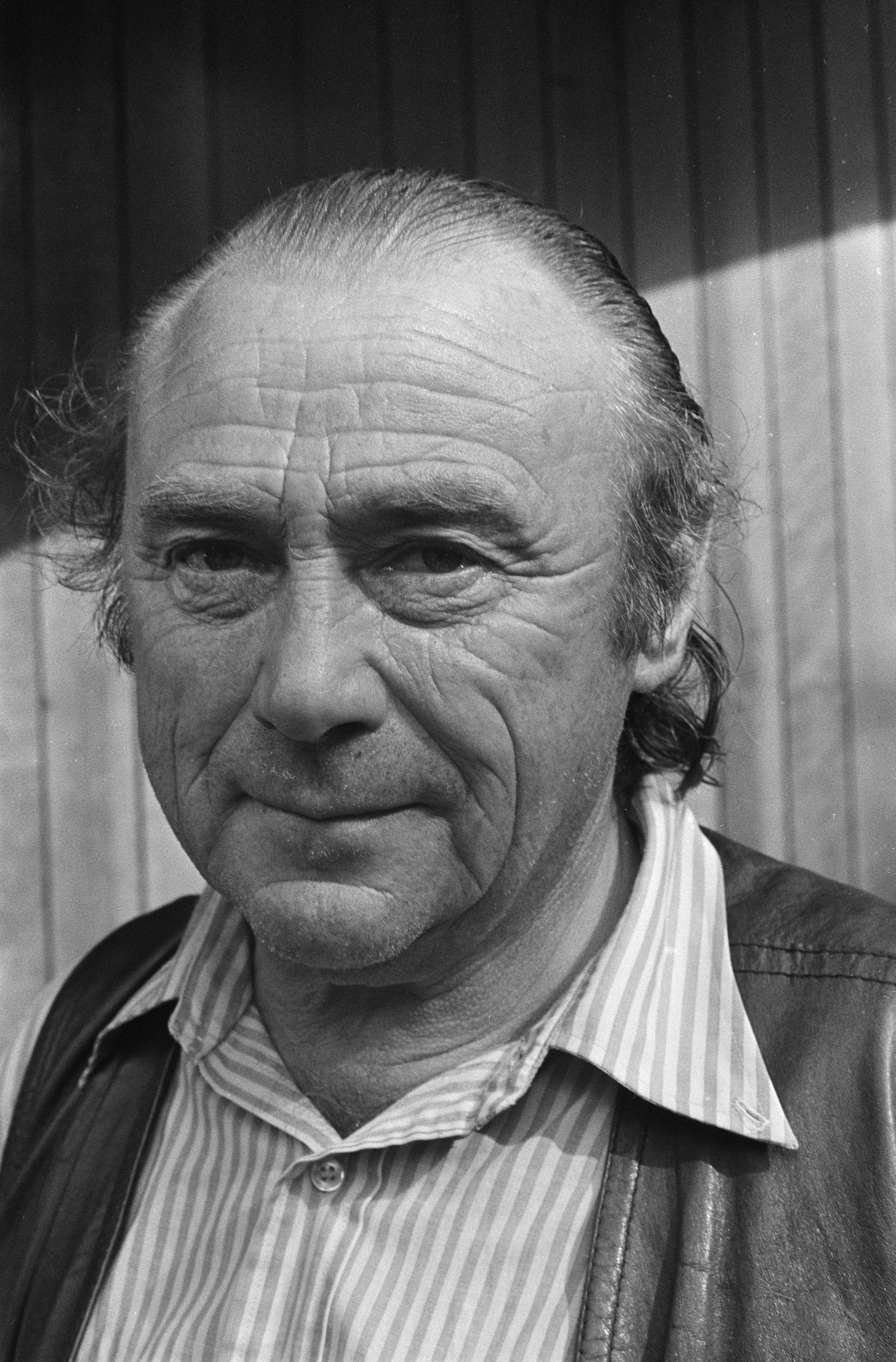
Bert Schierbeek (1974)

Lambertus Roelof (Bert) Schierbeek (18 June 1918, Glanerbrug, Overijssel – 9 June 1996, Amsterdam) was a Dutch writer. He won numerous awards throughout his career, amongst them the 1991 Constantijn Huygens Prize.

During the German occupation, Schierbeek was part of the resistance movement; directly after the war (in 1945), he published his first, still conventional novel that dealt with exactly these experiences (translated, this novel reads as Terror against terror). Then, he wrote the first experimental novel in the Dutch language, which was published in 1951. Its title is Het boek Ik (The Book I) and apparently does not have any narrative structure; it seems to consist of poetic associations of 'loose' words and thoughts. It is the first in a trilogy. The other volumes are De andere namen (The Other Names) and De derde persoon (The Third Person).

Bert Schierbeek was also part of COBRA, an internationalist artistical movement that intended to renew and modernise the postwar visual arts and poetry (with members like Karel Appel, Hugo Claus, Corneille and Lucebert).

His De Tuinen van Zen (The Gardens of Zen, 1959) was one of the first books on Zen Buddhism to be published in Dutch.

His 'composition novels', composed of fragments, culminated in the multilingual and multimodal (including illustrations and experimental typography) Een grote dorst (A Great Thirst, 1968).
