= Glanerbrug =

- Town
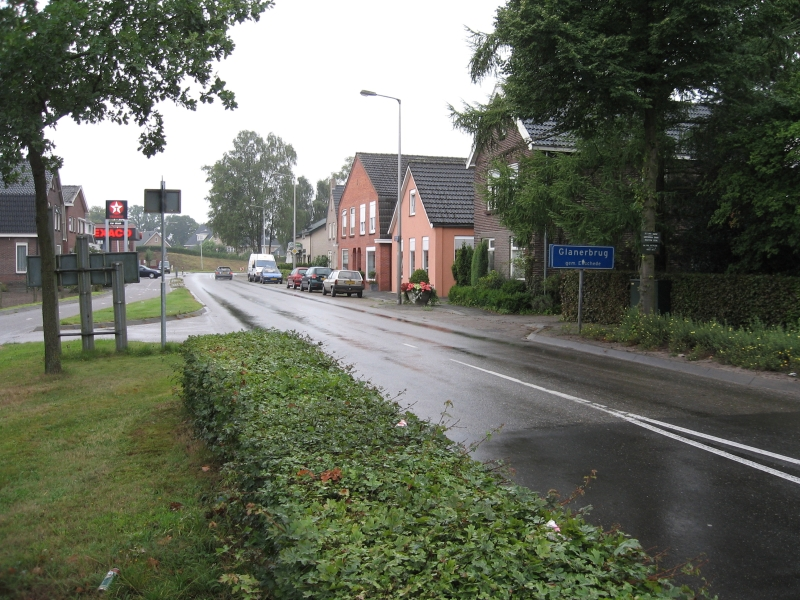
- Kerkstraat Glanerbrug
- Interactive map of Glanerbrug
- Location in the Netherlands Glanerbrug (Netherlands)
- Coordinates: 52°12′54″N 6°58′27″E
- Country: Netherlands
- Province: Overijssel
- Municipality: Enschede

Area
  - Total: 5.47 km^{2} (2.11 sq mi)
- Elevation: 39 m (128 ft)

Population (2021)
  - Total: 16,715
  - Density: 3,060/km^{2} (7,910/sq mi)
- Time zone: UTC+01:00 (CET)
  - Summer (DST): UTC+02:00 (CEST)
- Postal code: 7532 & 7534
- Dialing code: +31 (0)53

Glanerbrug [ɣlaːnər'brʏx] is a town east of the city of Enschede, the Netherlands. It is close to the border with Germany, formed by the stream Glanerbeek, and the city of Gronau, North Rhine-Westphalia. The name Glanerbrug is derived from the bridge (Dutch: brug) over the Glanerbeek stream.

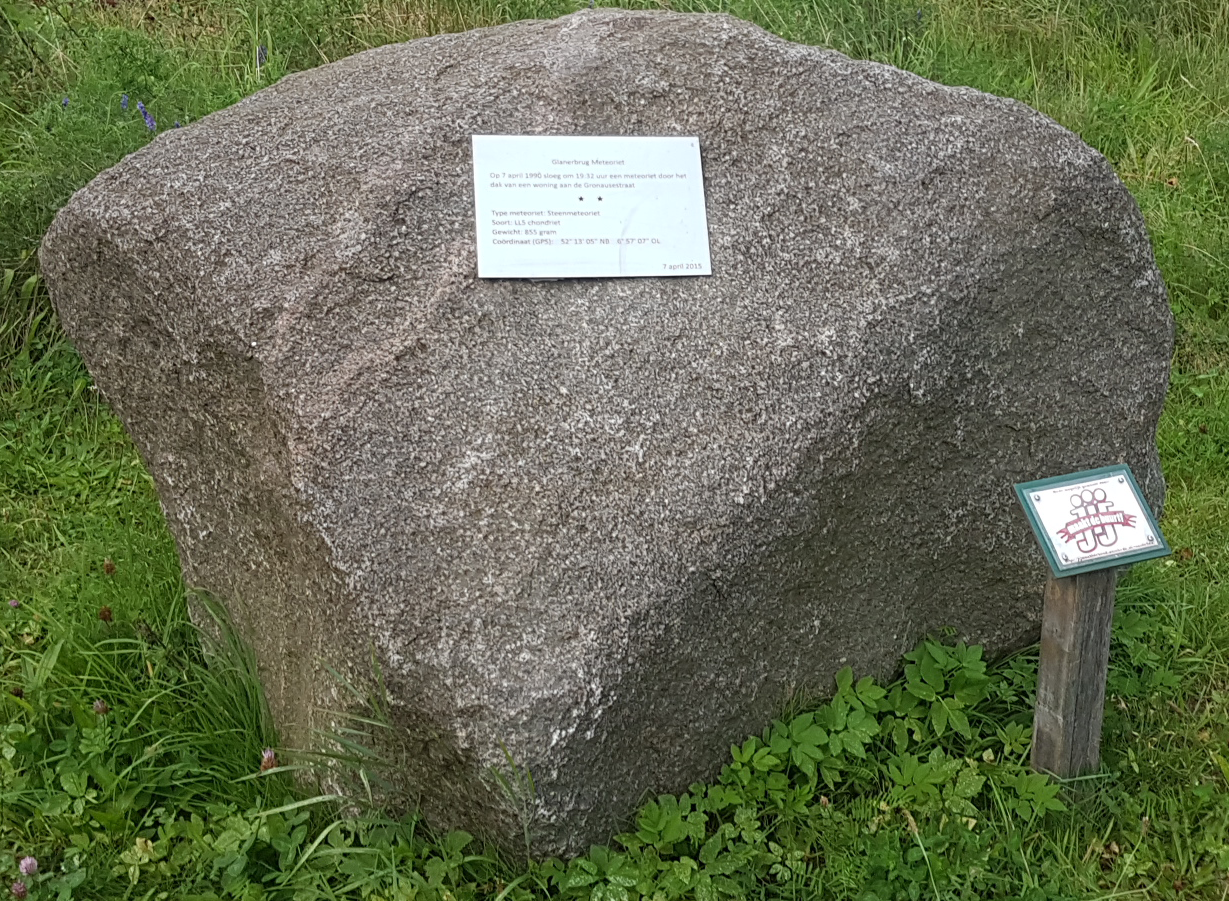
Boulder marking the point of impact of the meteorite in Glanerbrug

On 7 April 1990 the Glanerbrug meteorite fell through the roof of a house there. Further information: Meteorite fall § Others.

== Transportation ==
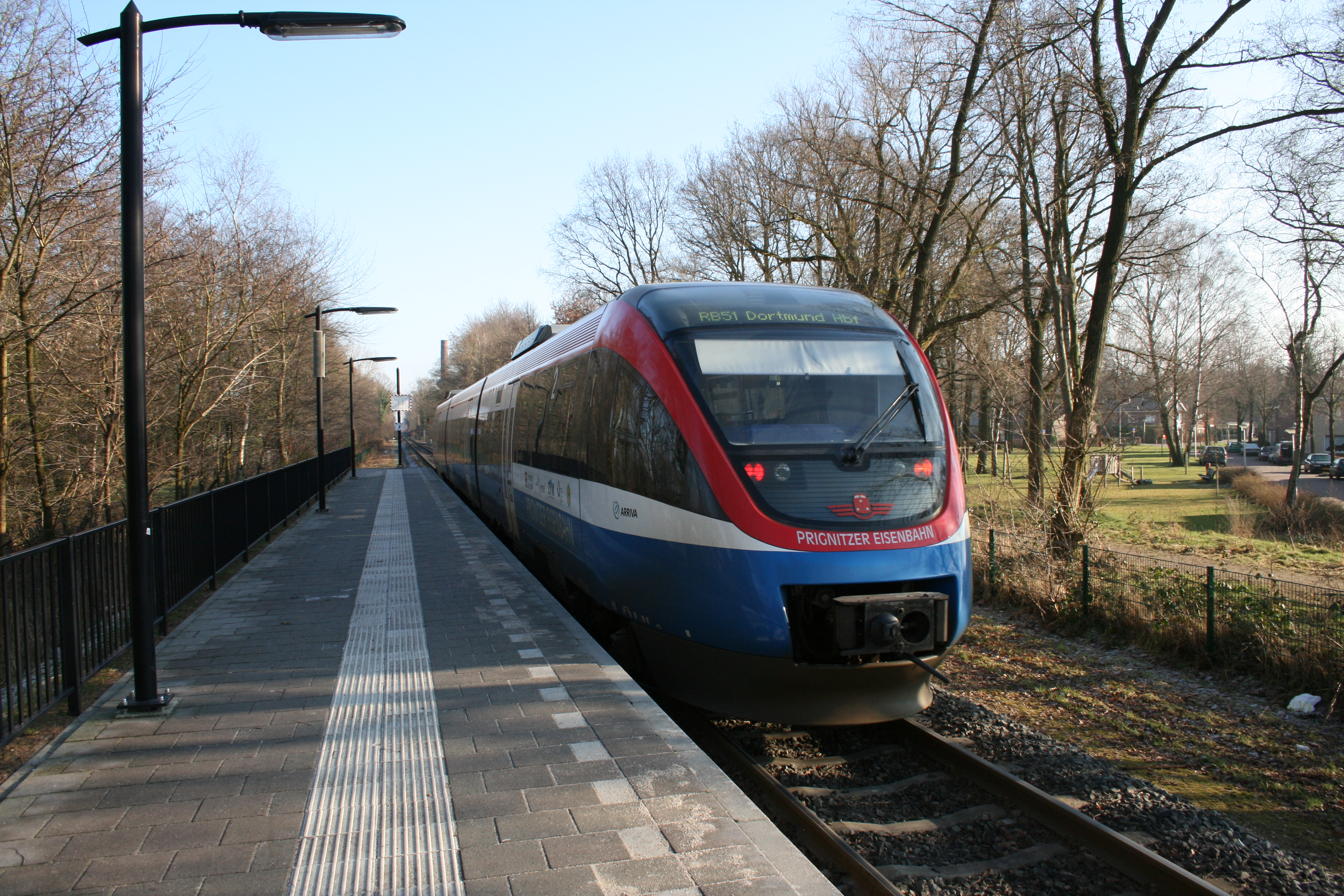
Glanerbrug station

Railway Station: Glanerbrug

== Born in Glanerbrug ==
- Floris van Assendelft (born 1985), chess player
- Erik Dijkstra, (born 1977), journalist and TV presenter
- Nick Hengelman (born 1989), footballer
- Hennie Hollink (born 1931), footballer and football manager
- Rob Groener (born 1945), footballer and football manager
- Bert Schierbeek (1918–1996), writer
- Dennis Schouten (born 1995), reporter

== See also ==
- Joppie sauce
