= Hennie Hollink =

Dutch footballer (1931–2018)

Personal information
- Full name: Hendrikus Hollink
- Date of birth: 1 October 1931
- Place of birth: Glanerbrug, Netherlands
- Date of death: 31 January 2018 (aged 86)
- Place of death: Almelo, Netherlands
- Position: Forward

Senior career*
Years	Team	Apps	(Gls)
- Avanti Wilskracht
1956-1957	Helmondia '55	28	(12)
1957-1959	Rapid JC	15	(8)
1959-1960	DFC	7	(1)
1960-1966	Bekkerveld		

Managerial career
- 1968–1969: Eindhoven
- 1969–1972: HVC
- 1972–1974: Roda JC
- 1974–1976: Strasbourg
- 1976–1979: Heracles
- 1979–1981: Twente
- 1981–1983: Tours
- 1984: RBC
- * Club domestic league appearances and goals

Hendrikus ("Hennie") Hollink (1 October 1931 – 31 January 2018) was a Dutch association football player and manager who managed Roda JC, FC Twente and Heracles Almelo.

== Playing career ==
A forward, he played professional football himself in the 1950s and 1960s. He started at hometown club Avanti Wilskracht and also played for Helmondia '55, Rapid JC, DFC and RKSV Bekkerveld. Roda JC had paid 50,000 guilders to Helmondia for Hollink, which was a big sum at the time, but he never really justified that money.

== Managerial career ==
Hollink won the 1972-73 Eerste Divisie title managing former club Roda JC, but he became the first coach ever to be sacked by the club. He then moved abroad to take charge of French side Strasbourg. Back in the Netherlands he worked at Heracles before succeeding Spitz Kohn at Twente and qualifying them for European football. He later became a board member at Heracles.

He died on 31 January 2018.
