= Gronau (Westf) station =

Railway station in Gronau, Germany

Gronau (Westf)
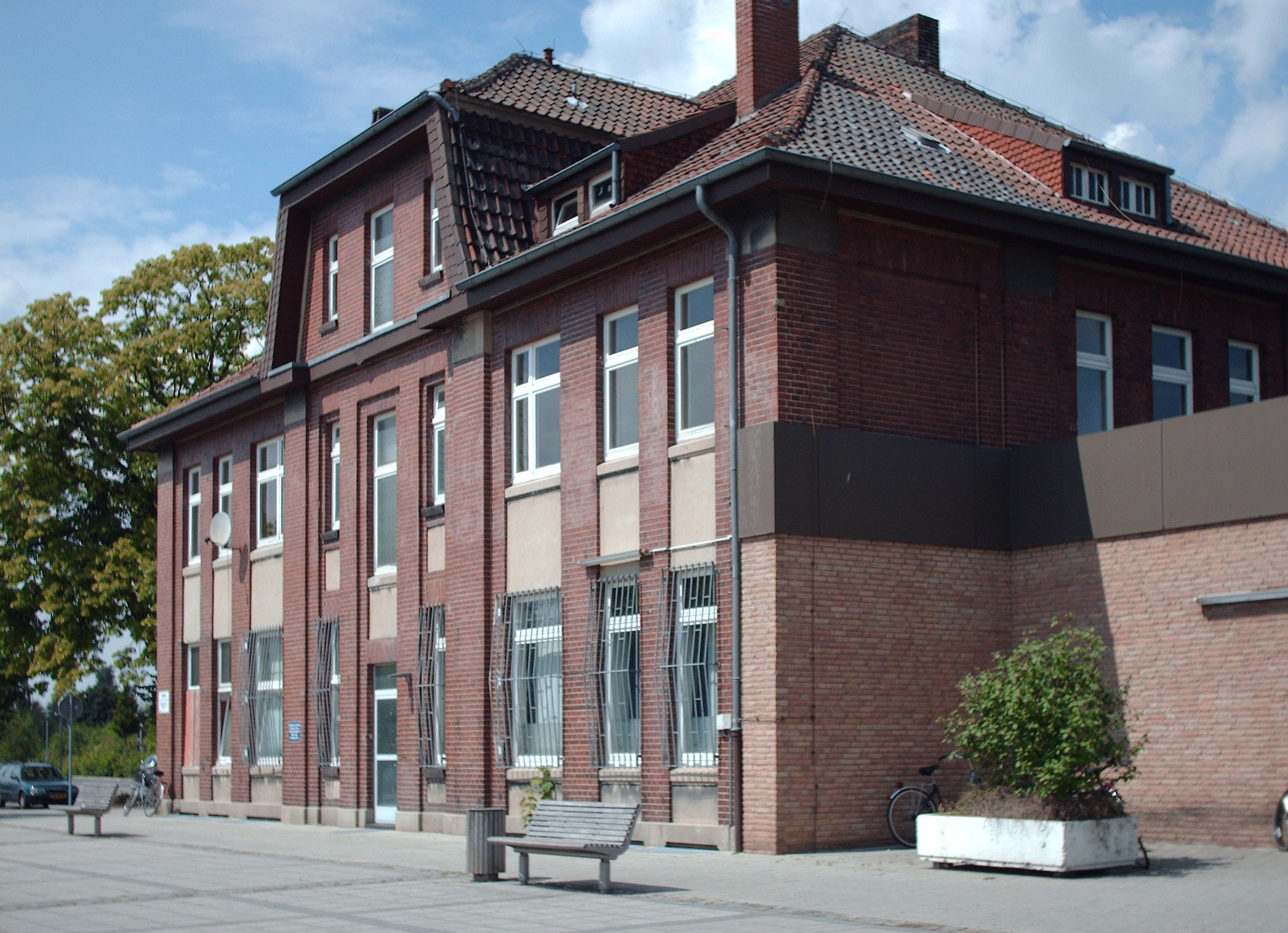
- Gronau (Westf) railway station

General information
- Location: Gronau, NRW, Germany
- Coordinates: 52°12′55″N 7°01′19″E
- Lines: Dortmund–Gronau railway Münster–Enschede railway
- Platforms: 3
- Tracks: 3

Construction
- Accessible: Yes

Other information
- Station code: 2288
- Category: 5
- Fare zone: VGB: 101 (buses only); Westfalentarif: 57751
- Website: www.bahnhof.de

History
- Opened: September 1875

Services
Preceding station	DB Regio NRW	Following station
Glanerbrug towards Enschede	RB 51	Epe (Westf) towards Dortmund Hbf
Glanerbrug towards Enschede	RB 64	Ochtrup towards Münster Hbf
Location

Gronau (Westf) (German: Bahnhof Gronau (Westf)) is a railway station in the town of Gronau, North Rhine-Westphalia, Germany. The station lies on the Dortmund–Gronau railway and Münster–Enschede railway and the train services are operated by Deutsche Bahn. The line between Enschede and Gronau was closed in 1981 and re-opened in 2001. To the west of the station are 3 sidings.

== Train services ==
The station is served by the following services:

- regional service RB 51 Enschede - Gronau - Coesfeld - Lünen - Dortmund
- regional service RB 64 Enschede - Gronau - Münster

== Bus services ==
The following bus services serve the station:

- R77 Gronau - Nienborg - Heek - Ahaus
- 174 Gronau - Ochtrup - Burgsteinfurt
- 182 Gronau - Ochtrup
- 400 Gronau - Gildehaus - Bad Bentheim - Nordhorn
- 781 Gronau - Ahaus - Legden - Coesfeld
- 882 Gronau - Gildehauser Str + Butenland (Town service)
- 883 Gronau - Buterland + Gildehauser Str (Town service)

== Fare association ==
The station is located in the area of the fare association Westfalen-Tarif

== Gallery ==
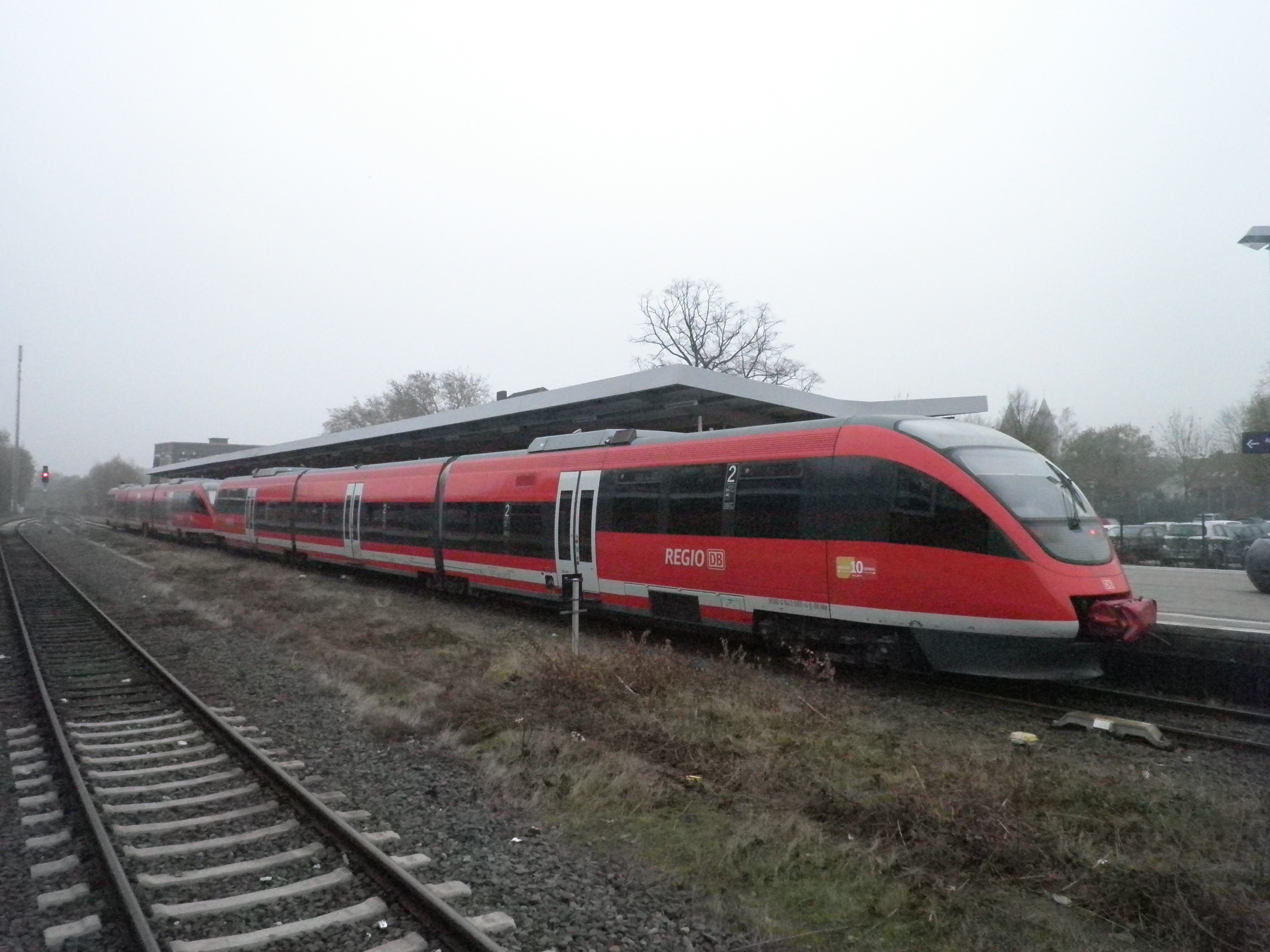
A DB service to Münster

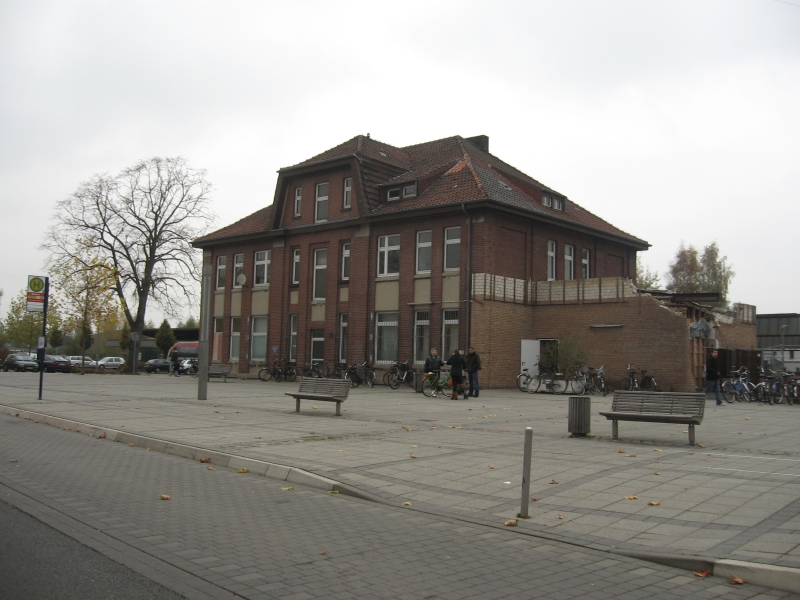
The station building

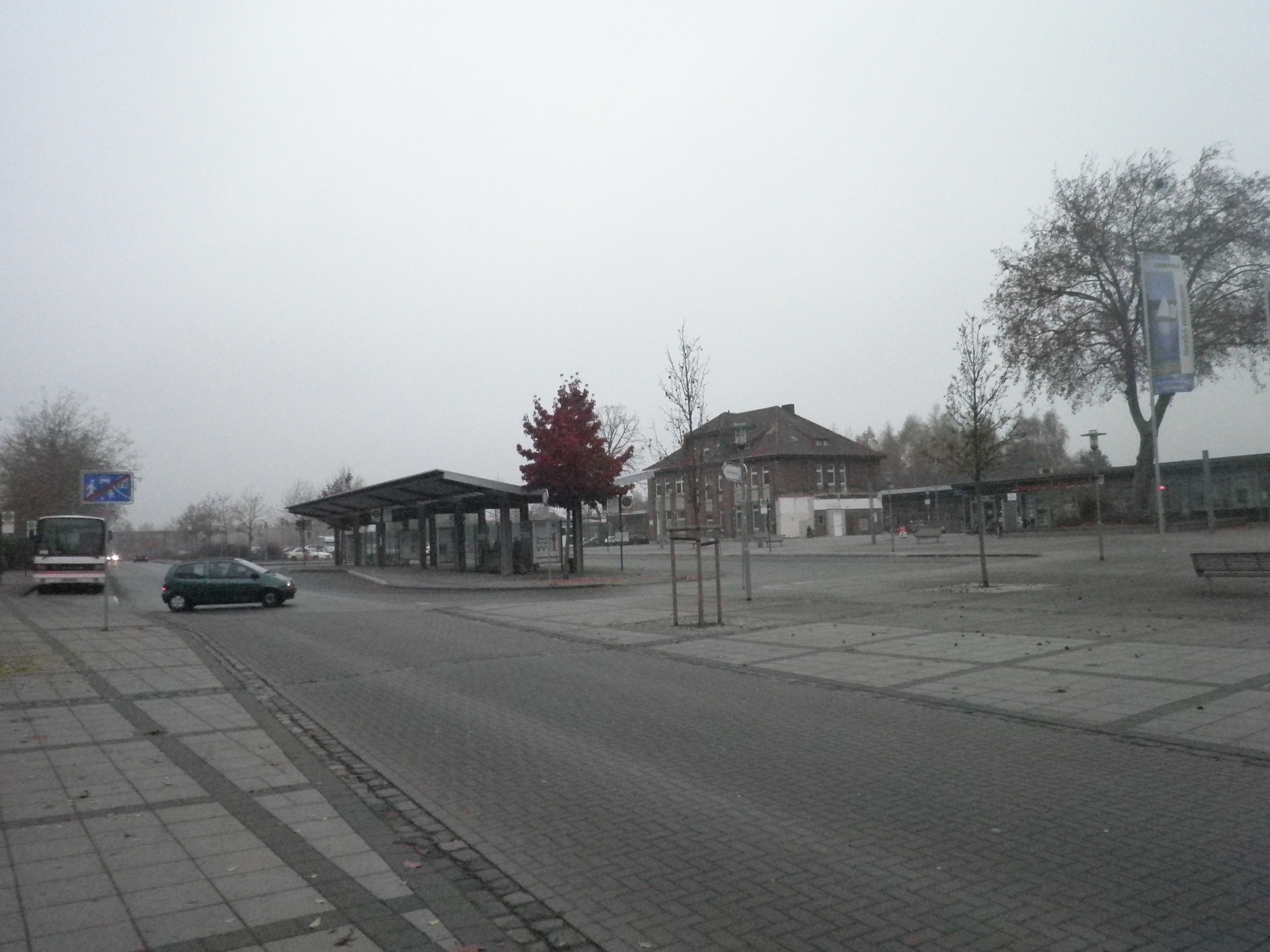
The bus station outside the station
