= Münster–Enschede railway =

Railway line in Germany and the Netherlands

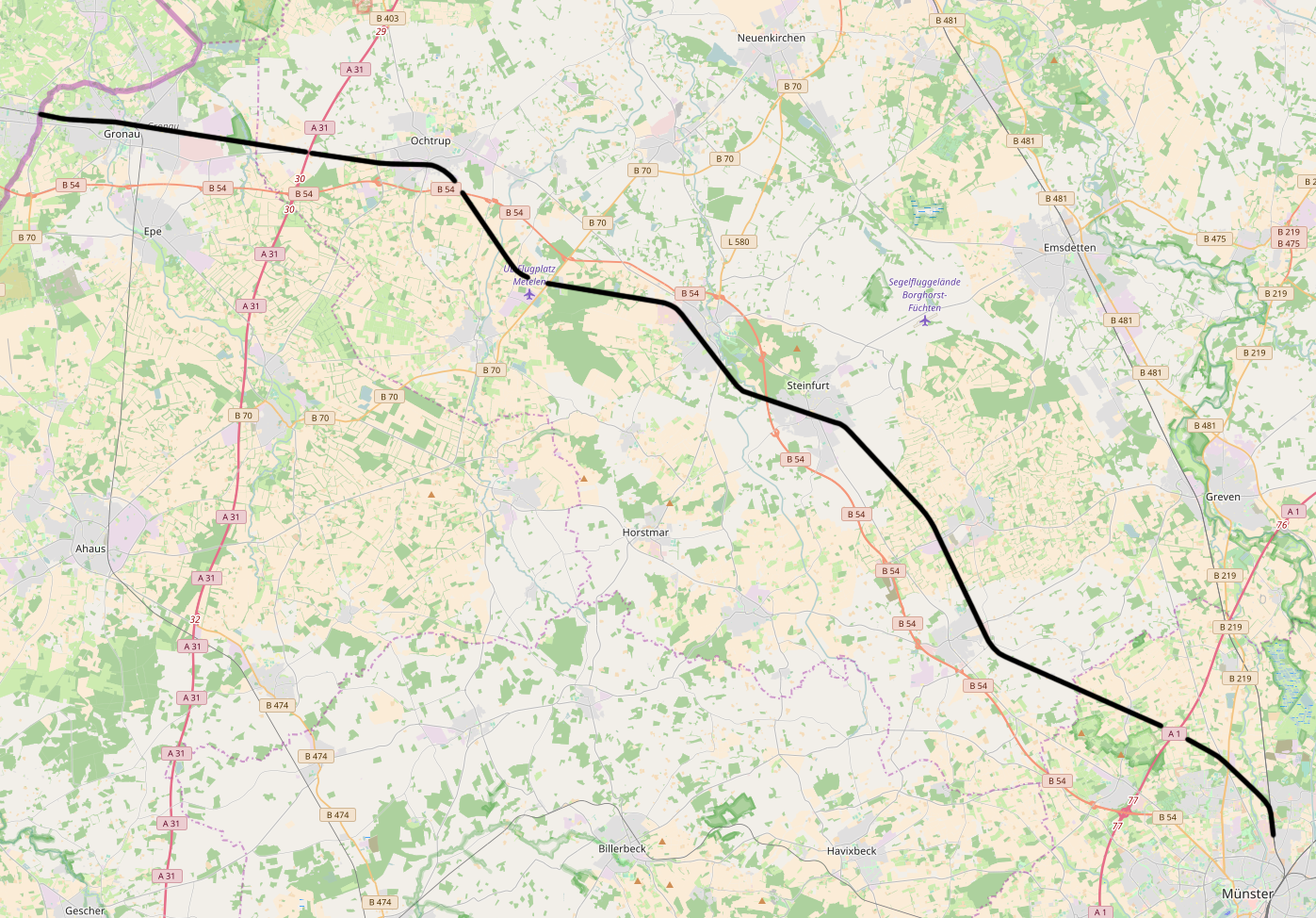

Overview
- Line number: 2014
- Locale: North Rhine-Westphalia, Germany and the Netherlands

Service
- Route number: 407

Technical
- Line length: 64 km (40 mi)
- Track gauge: 1,435 mm (4 ft 8 1/2 in) standard gauge
- Operating speed: 100 km/h (62 mph)

The Münster–Enschede railway is a 64 km long, continuous single-track and non-electrified branch line from Münster via Gronau in the German state of North Rhine-Westphalia to Enschede in the Netherlands.

Regionalbahn service RB 64 (Euregio-Bahn) runs over it.

The Münster-Enschede Railway Company (Münster-Enscheder Eisenbahn-Gesellschaft, MEE) planned the line and started its construction, but its completion was carried out by the Royal Westphalian Railway Company (Königlich-Westfälische Eisenbahn, KWE), which was funded by the Prussian government.

== History ==
After the KWE took over the Münster-Hamm Railway Company (Münster-Hammer Eisenbahn-Gesellschaft), together with its line to Münster, in 1855, it continued this line to the north in 1856. In Rheine it connected with the Royal Hanoverian State Railways' Emsland Railway to Emden and through it to the Almelo–Salzbergen railway of the Spoorweg-Maatschappij Almelo-Salzbergen (Almelo-Salzbergen railway company).

In 1870, the MEE received a concession to build a new line to the Netherlands and started construction from Münster to Enschede. When it became insolvent in 1874, the KWE took it over and continued construction of the line to Gronau. The last part to Enschede was built and subsequently operated jointly with the Dortmund-Gronau-Enschede Railway Company (Dortmund-Gronau-Enscheder Eisenbahn-Gesellschaft, DGEE).

The new line was opened on 30 September 1875 and the DGEE opened the last section of the Dortmund–Enschede railway between Coesfeld and Enschede on the same day. Two weeks later, on 15 October 1875, the section to Enschede was official opened for passenger traffic.

As a result of the Second World War, this section was inoperative from 1940 to 1951. Freight traffic ended in the autumn of 1979 and regular passenger services ended exactly two years later on 26 September 1981. The line was officially downgraded to a branch line on 1 March 1982 and the line was closed between Gronau and Enschede on 15 June 1985 with a special train trip. In the early 1990s the idea developed to build a Euroregion cycling path on the closed section. These plans were not pursued further. In 1996, a Dutch-German working group was established with the aim of reopening the line. Initially it was expected to have about 2,000 passengers per day. A public agreement to restart passenger services between Enschede and Gronau was signed on 18 November 1998. A short time later, the first work began, so that the line was reopened on 16 November 2001. The stations of Glanerbrug and Enschede De Eschmarke were added to the line.

Although the line is identical with the line to Rheine for the first kilometres to Nevinghoff, the Royal Westphalian Railway built a separate track parallel to the existing line. It was dismantled during the reconstruction of the line after the Second World War.

A special feature of the railway is the Metelen Land railway museum at Metelen Land station.

== Current operations ==
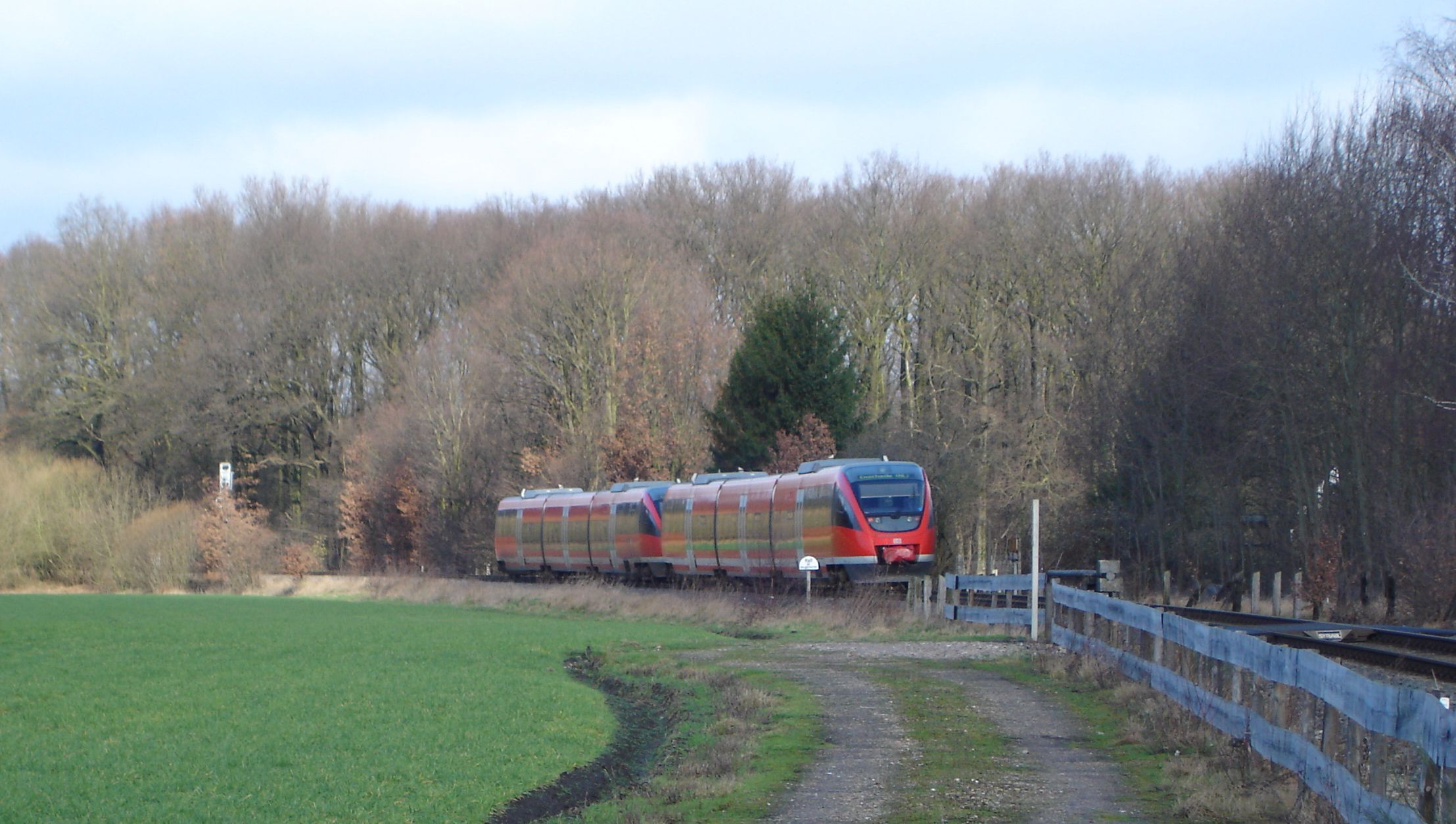
The Euregio-Bahn service towards Enschede shortly after the turn to Zentrum Nord near Nevinghoff.

Since the re-commissioning of the Dutch section of the line, the whole length of the line between Münster and Enschede has been served hourly by Regionalbahn service RB 64 (Euregio-Bahn). Between Gronau and Enschede, it alternates with the RB 51 (Westmünsterland-Bahn) service, which is operated by DB Regio NRW (which was operated by Prignitzer Eisenbahn GmbH between 2004 and 2012), creating a half-hourly service on this section. There are connections in Enschede to Dutch InterCity services on the Amersfoort–Schiphol, Amersfoort–Utrecht–Rotterdam, Amersfoort–Utrecht–Den Haag routes and local services on the Almelo–Zwolle and Almelo–Deventer–Apeldoorn routes. Services are operated using 1 to 3 Bombardier Talent diesel multiple units. The average speed is about 49 km/h.

The extension to Enschede led to disproportionate passenger growth. The Euregio service is now one of the most important rail services in Western Münsterland and is used by thousands of commuters daily. On weekends, many German passengers use this line to go to the market in Enschede. Similarly, many Dutch people use the Euregio train to visit Münster for example. The line is used by many students on workdays to travel from Münster to Standort Steinfurt to reach the Münster University of Applied Sciences. The capacity during the peak hour, however, is very limited.

There are additional late connections on Friday and Saturday nights and on the eve of public holidays.

The Euregio-Bahn was previously operated as part of the Münster West Network diesel network under the auspices of the Zweckverbands Nahverkehr Westfalen-Lippe (Local transport association of Westphalia-Lippe, NWL). After a temporary suspension of the tender on 28 April 2010, it was announced that DB Regio Westphalia has been awarded the contract for this network. It has the contract to operate it for 15 years from December 2011.

== Fares ==
Westfalen-Tarif

The section of the railway line in Germany is located in the area of the fare association Westfalen-Tarif.

== Development ==
On 23 November 2008, DB Netz put in operation an electronic interlocking bases in Coesfeld. The electronic interlocking currently controls traffic on the Münster–Enschede line, including the branch to Coesfeld. The line speed on the Münster Zentrum Nord–Burgsteinfurt section was increased to 100 km/h from 80 km/h or 90 km/h.

As the use of the trains has been on the rise in recent years, which is attributed to commuter traffic to the university located in Steinfurt and the attractiveness of the modernisation of the line, services are approaching the limits of their capacity. As a result, the Zweckverband SPNV Münsterland (public transport association of Münsterland) initiated the discussion on electrification in February 2012, allowing the line to be operated with double-deck cars. It would also be possible to use diesel-hauled double-deck cars, but diesel engines would not be as efficient as electric locomotives.

In September 2012, the council of the Münster district published a list of rail projects as a submission to the new Federal Transport Infrastructure Plan (Bundesverkehrswegeplan), which is intended to be finalised in 2015. Among them is the electrification of the Münster-Enschede line. Its justification is listed as "increasing the line speed and increasing the service frequency by electrification and the occasional duplication of the line to enable greater service density".
