= Enschede railway station =

Railway station in the Netherlands

Enschede
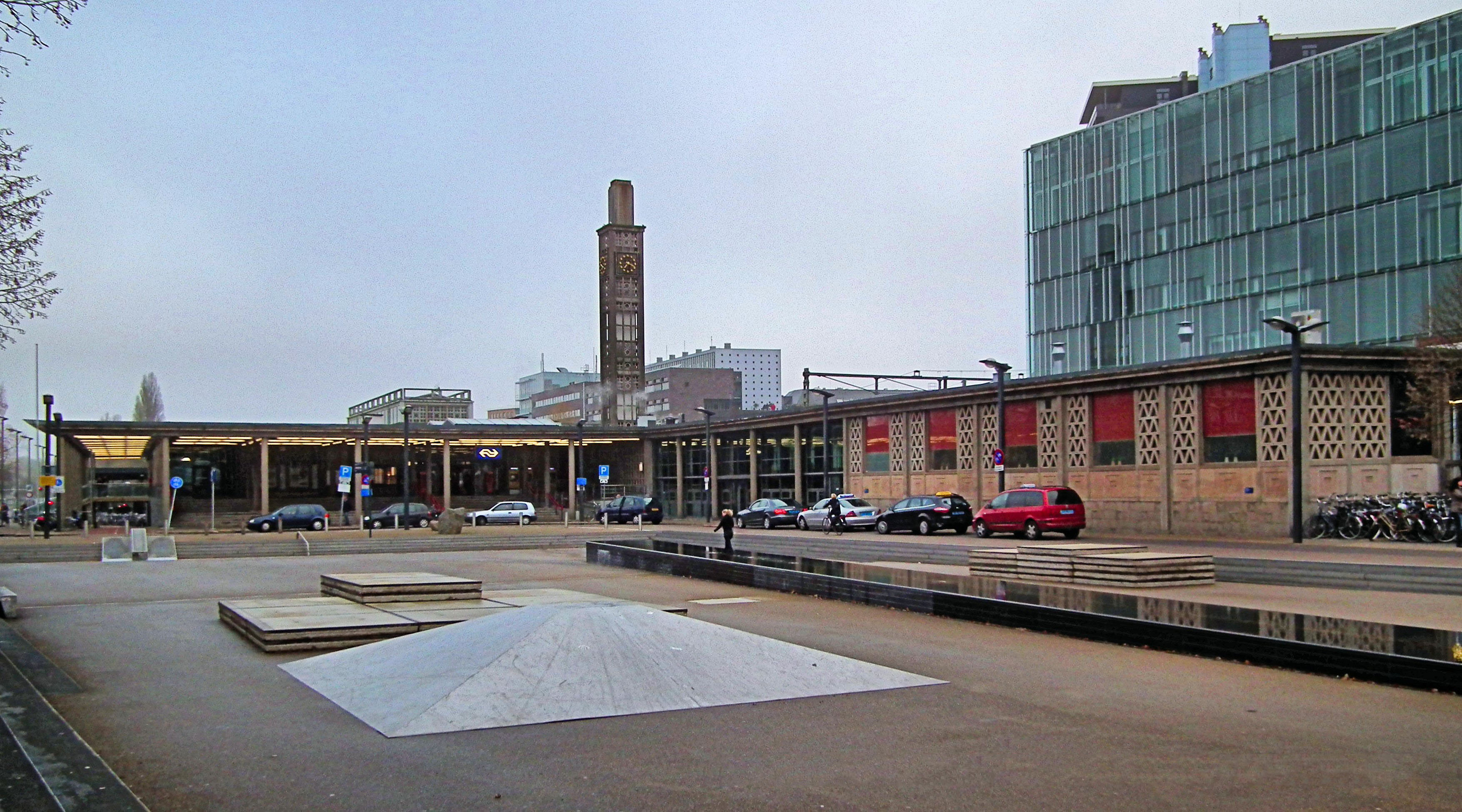
- Enschede station

General information
- Location: Enschede, Overijssel, Netherlands
- Coordinates: 52°13′20″N 6°53′24″E
- Owner: Nederlandse Spoorwegen
- Lines: Zutphen–Glanerbeek railway Enschede–Münster railway
- Platforms: 4
- Tracks: 5 (originally 6, because track 4 is physically divided in two)
- Connections: Arriva: 73, 74; Syntus: 60, 61, 62, 505, 506; RVM: T88

Construction
- Architect: H.G Schelling
- Architectural style: Nieuwe Zakelijkheid

Other information
- Station code: Es

History
- Opened: 1 July 1866
Services
Preceding station	Nederlandse Spoorwegen	Following station
Hengelo towards Den Haag Centraal	NS Intercity 1700 Until 20:00	Terminus
Hengelo towards Rotterdam Centraal	NS Intercity 1700 After 20:00	Terminus
Enschede Kennispark towards Apeldoorn	NS Sprinter 7000	Terminus
Preceding station	Keolis Nederland	Following station
Enschede Kennispark towards Zwolle	Sprinter 7900	Terminus
Hengelo towards Zwolle	Intercity 17900 Not on evenings or weekends	Terminus
Preceding station	DB Regio NRW	Following station
Terminus	RB 51	Enschede De Eschmarke towards Dortmund Hbf
Terminus	RB 64	Enschede De Eschmarke towards Münster Hbf
Location
- Location within Netherlands

Enschede is the main railway station in Enschede, Netherlands. The station opened on 1 July 1866 and is on the Zutphen–Glanerbeek railway. Between the late 1970s and 2001, the passenger service to Germany stopped. The connection to Münster was reopened in 2001. There is no connection allowing the German trains to run any further into Overijssel; however there was before the line closed.

From summer 2013 to summer 2014 the station is being largely modernised. The station was closed between 6 July and 18 August 2013, in which all the rails and overhead wires were replaced at the station. Platforms 1 and 2 were extended; platform 5 was closed. Platform 4 has been split in two, one part for the trains to Germany and the other part for the Sprinters. The two lines are still not connected. The sidings for stabling trains were also replaced and points replaced to reduce the noise made as trains pass over them.

== History ==
On 1 July 1866 Enschede got a station on the Zutphen–Glanerbeek railway line. The station building was the Staatsspoor new type 3rd class design. Also Hengelo had such a station from 1866 to 1899. The current stations of Meppel (1865) and Station Zuidbroek (1865) also follow the same design.

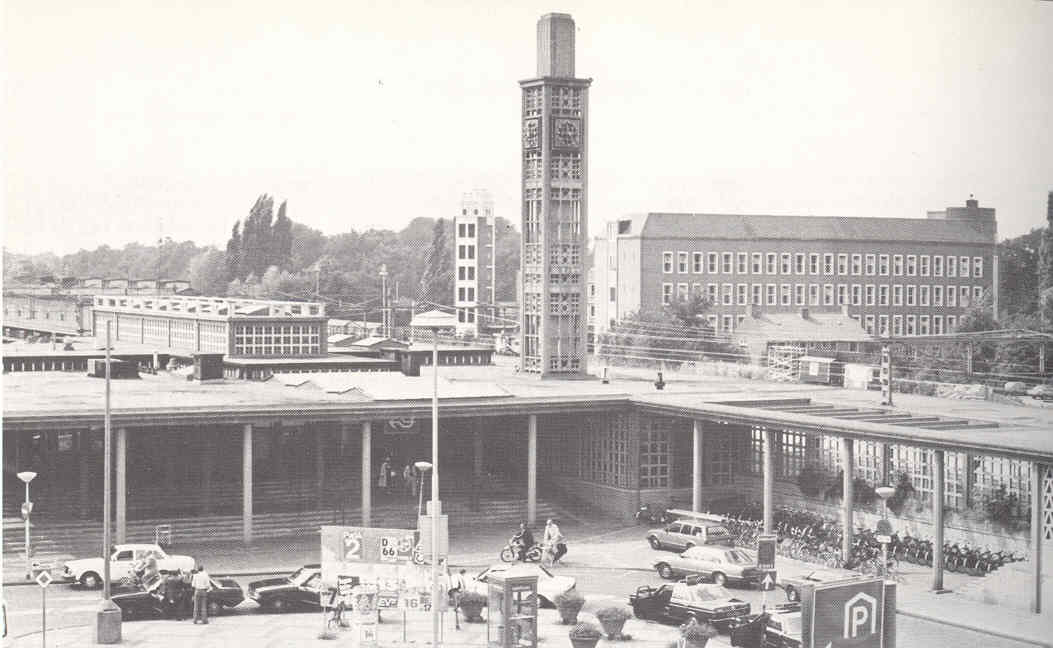
Enschede station in the 1960s

The present building was designed after the Second World War and opened in 1950. The architect H.G.J. Schelling (1888–1978) designed the station to be a combination of both a through station and a terminus. It lost its status as a through station for the Netherlands rail network when the Deutsche Bahn terminated its services between Gronau and Enschede in 1981.

2000 saw some significant structural alterations. The sidesteps were removed, and a new entrance was built in the centre of the entrance hall.

The latest service addition to the station came on 18 November 2001, when DB Regio reopened the train service to Gronau and Münster/Dortmund. These trains departed from a newly constructed platform 5, located along the northern side of the newly constructed rail line connecting with the remainder of the station complex via the adjacent level crossing. After the renovation of 2013, the services to and from Germany were integrated into the station complex and moved to the eastern end of platform 4 which is now split into platforms 4a and 4b. As the Dutch and German rail lines use different rail safety systems, the tracks do not at any point physically connect. As such, for train services Enschede effectively became a "double terminus".

== Train services ==
As of 11 December 2018, the following train services call at this station:

Series	Type	Route	Notes
1600	InterCity	Schiphol Airport – Amsterdam Zuid – Duivendrecht – Hilversum – Amersfoort Centraal – Apeldoorn – Deventer – Almelo – Hengelo – Enschede	Forms a half-hourly service with series 11600 between Schiphol and Amersfoort Centraal. Forms a half-hourly service with series 1700 between Amersfoort Centraal and Enschede.
1700	InterCity	Den Haag Centraal – Gouda – Utrecht Centraal – Amersfoort Centraal – Apeldoorn – Deventer – Almelo – Hengelo – Enschede	Forms a half-hourly service with series 11700 between The Hague Central and Amersfoort Central. Forms a half-hourly service with series 1600 between Amersfoort Central and Enschede.
7000	Sprinter	Apeldoorn – Deventer – Almelo – Hengelo – Enschede	To/from Enschede during rush hour
7900	Sprinter (Keolis)	Zwolle – Almelo – Hengelo – Enschede	Part of Blauwnet
17900	Sprinter (Keolis)	Zwolle – Almelo – Hengelo – Enschede	Part of Blauwnet. Only runs on working days during the day and 1x per hour.
20180 RB 64	Regionalbahn (DB Regio NRW)	Münster (Westf) Hbf – Steinfurt-Burgsteinfurt – Gronau (Westf) – Enschede	Euregio-Bahn
20250 RB 51	Regionalbahn (DB Regio NRW)	Dortmund Hbf – Preußen – Lünen Hbf – Coesfeld (Westf) – Gronau (Westf) – Enschede	Westmünsterland-Bahn Dortmund-Lünen 2x per hour, from/to Enschede and on weekends 1x per hour

== Bus services ==
Many bus services depart from the bus station in front of the station, many carrying a red Twents livery, for the Twente region (Eastern Overijssel).

- 1 – Wesselerbrink – Boswinkel – Station NS – Twekkelerveld – Twente University
- 2 – Helmerhoek – Station NS – Roombeek – Deppenbroek – Bolhaar
- 3 – Station NS – Wooldrik – Esmarke – Glanerbrug
- 4 – Stroinkslanden – Station NS – 't Zwering
- 5 – 't Zwering – Station NS – Hogeland
- 6 – Stokhorst – Laares – Station NS – Transportcentrum – Boekelo
- 8 – Hengelo Station – Hengelo, IKEA – Hengelo, Vossenbelt – Hengelo, Hasseler Es – Hengelo, Groot Driene – Twente University – Enschede Station NS – Van Heekplein – Wesselerbrink – Transportcentrum – Hengelo Station
- 9 – Hengelo – Twente University – Enschede
- 60 – Enschede – Oldenzaal
- 61 – Enschede – Losser – Overdinkel
- 62 – Borculo – Neede – Haaksbergen – Enschede – Oldenzaal – Denekamp
- 73 – Enschede – Haaksbergen – Groenlo – Winterswijk
- 74 – Enschede – Haaksbergen – Groenlo – Doetinchem

== Gallery ==
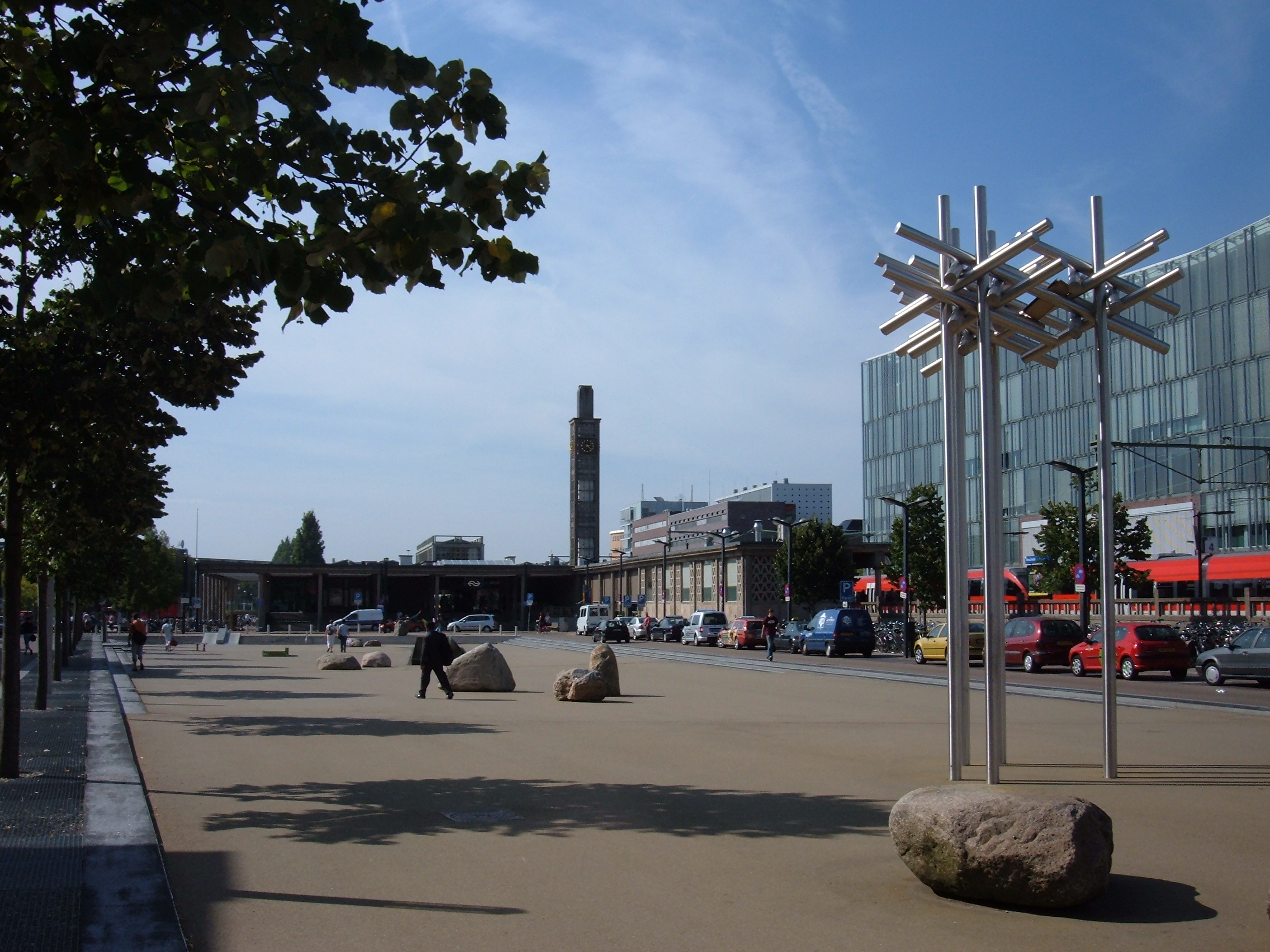
Station square

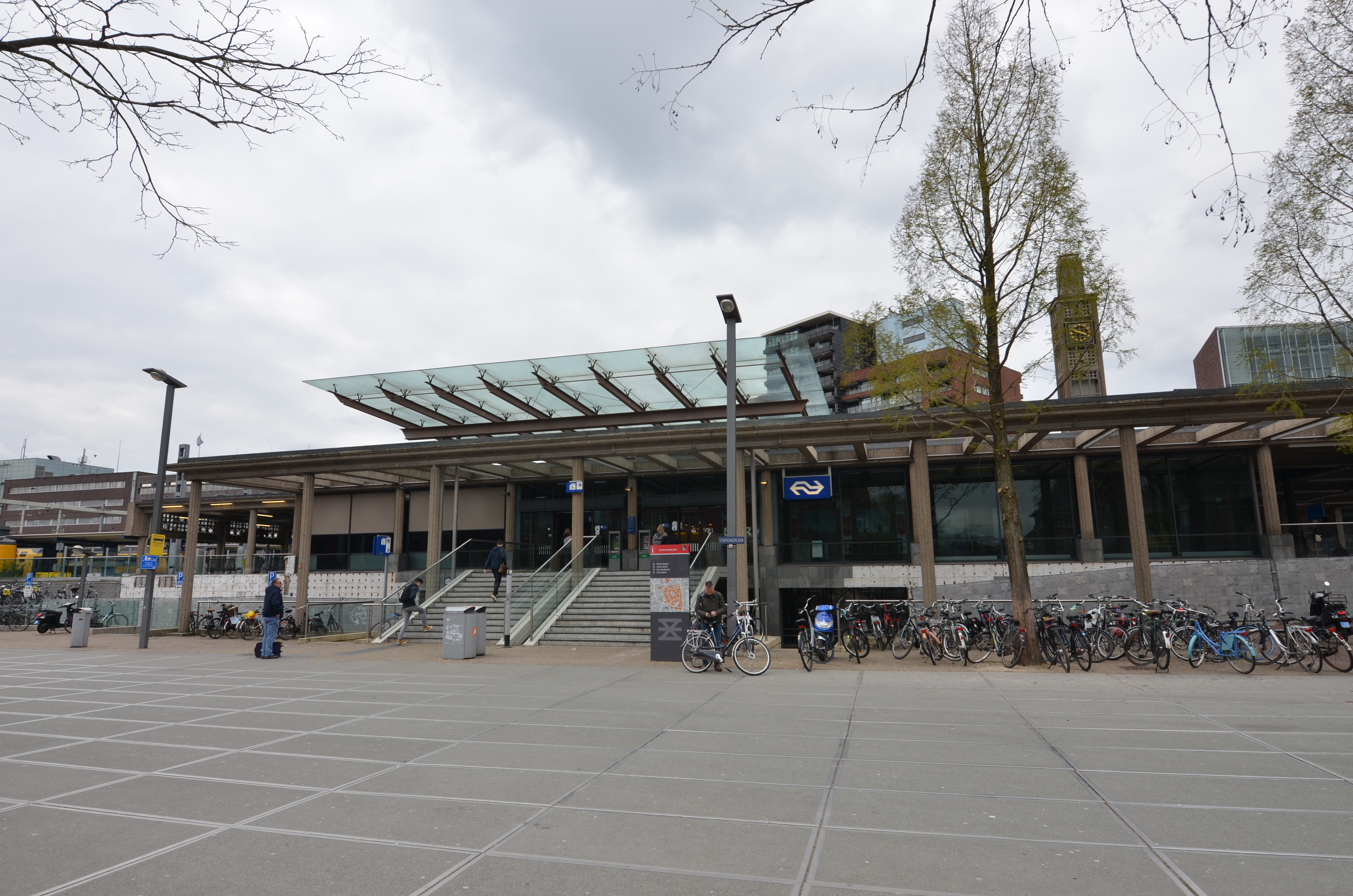
Main entrance

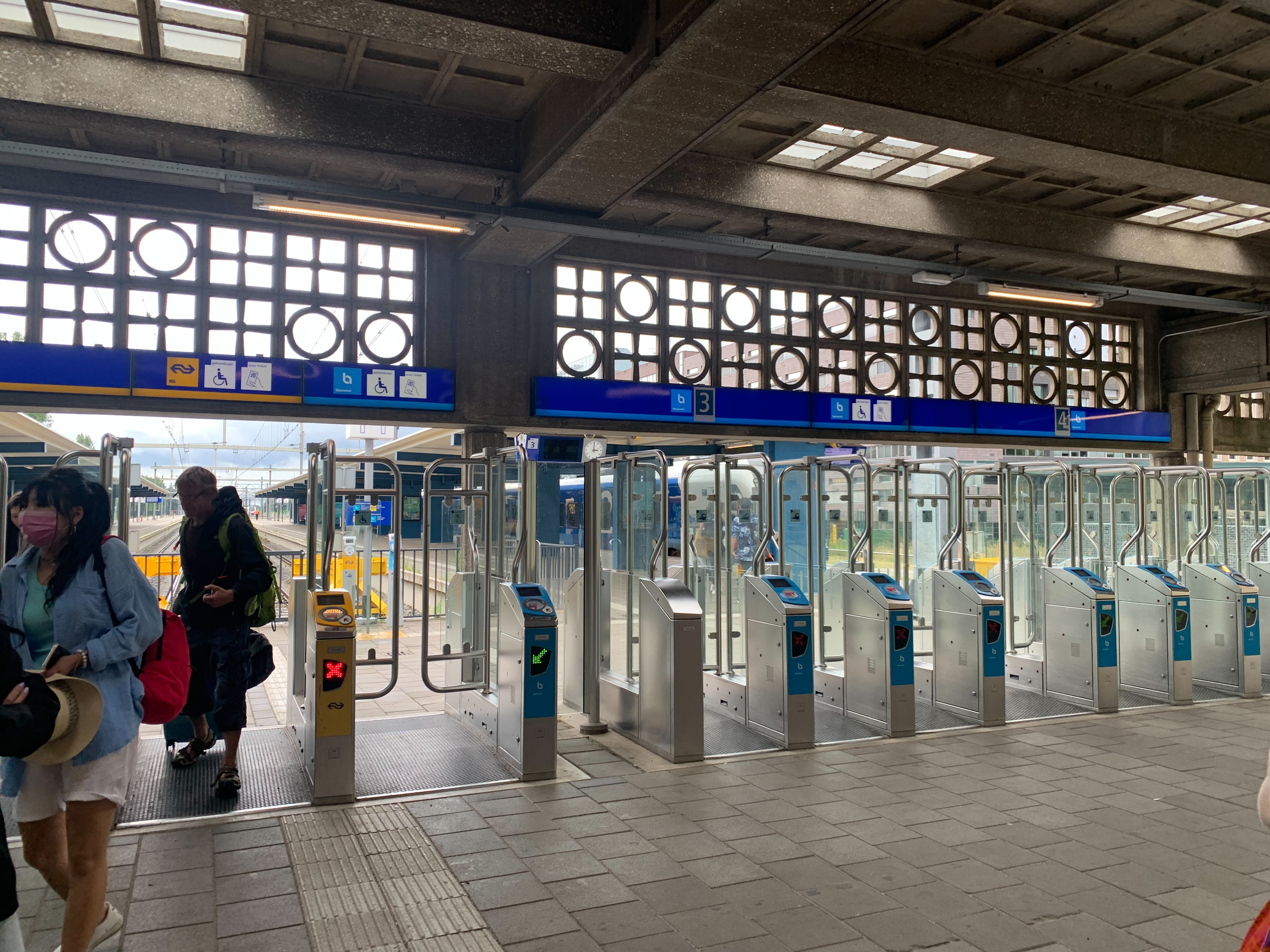
Ticket gate

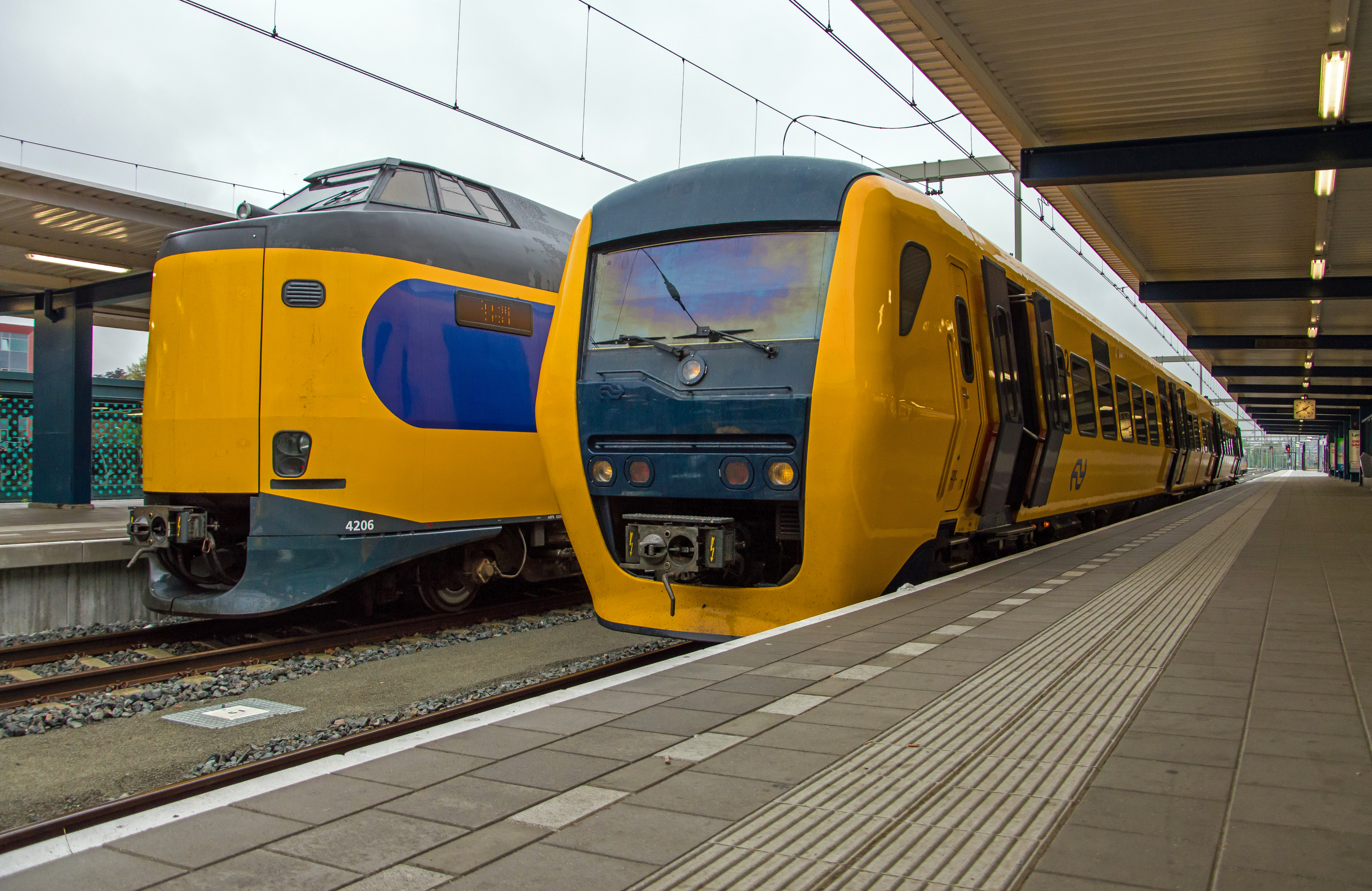
NS DM90 and NS ICMm 4045 in Enschede

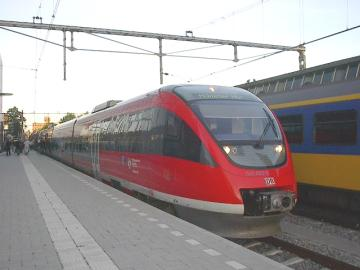
DB Regio Talent in Enschede
