= David L. Eaton =

- Born: August 15, 1952 (age 74)
- Citizenship: United States
- Education: Montana State University (BS); University of Kansas Medical Center (PhD)
- Awards: Fellow, American Association for the Advancement of Science (1995) Fellow, Academy of Toxicological Sciences (2000) SOT Public Communications Award (2014) PhRMA Foundation Lifetime Award (2015) David Rall Medal, National Academy of Medicine (2020) SOT Merit Award (2024)
- Scientific career
- Fields: Toxicology, carcinogenesis, ecogenetics, risk assessment
- Workplaces: University of Washington

David L. Eaton (born August 15, 1952) is an American toxicologist and professor Emeritus at the University of Washington (UW). His work focuses on risk assessment, gene-environment interactions, environmental carcinogenesis, and xenobiotic biotransformation. Over his career, Eaton has chaired committees for the National Academies of Sciences, Engineering, and Medicine (NASEM), held academic administration positions at the University of Washington, and presided over the Society of Toxicology (SOT).

== Early life and education ==
In 1974, Eaton graduated from Montana State University with a Bachelor of Science in Pre-Medical Sciences. Under the guidance of Curtis Klaassen and John Doull, he earned a Ph.D. in pharmacology and toxicology at the University of Kansas Medical Center in 1978. In 1979, he joined the faculty at the University of Washington after completing a postdoctoral fellowship in toxicology at the same institution after earning his Ph.D.

== Career ==
Eaton spent his academic career within the Department of Environmental and Occupational Health Sciences (DEOHS) at the University of Washington School of Public Health. He served as the Director of the UW Toxicology Program from 1986 to 1991. From 1995 to 2015, he led the National Institute of Environmental Health Sciences (NIEHS) Core Center as the founding director of the Center for Ecogenetics and Environmental Health (CEEH).

In university-wide administration, Eaton served as Associate Dean for Research in the School of Public Health and Community Medicine from 1999 to 2005. He served as Associate Vice Provost for Research from 2006 to 2013, Interim Vice Provost for Research from 2010 to 2011, and Dean and Vice Provost of The Graduate School from 2013 until 2018. He retired as Professor Emeritus in 2019.

=== Research ===
The molecular mechanisms of chemical toxicity, carcinogen metabolism, and inter-individual genetic variability are the main subjects of Eaton's scientific research. His early research focused on the bioactivation and detoxification pathways of Aflatoxin B1, describing species variations in Cytochrome P450 enzymes (specifically CYP1A2 and CYP3A4) and Glutathione S-transferases (GSTs) to clarify human cancer risks. Additionally, he studied glutathione production and GST-mediated detoxification of pesticides, contaminants, and medicinal substances in Phase II biotransformation. Later in his career, Eaton co-authored studies on the use of "organ-on-a-chip" microphysiological systems, such as dual liver-kidney platforms, to assess the toxicity of nanoparticles and organ damage brought on by substances like aristolochic acid.

=== National advisory and leadership roles ===
Eaton was elected to the Institute of Medicine (now the National Academy of Medicine) in 2011 and has led key national scientific committees. He presided over NASEM committees on the health effects of e-cigarettes (2018), dioxin exposure (2004–2006), and engineered nanoscale materials (2008). He led the 2018 cell phone radiation review panel, advised the NIEHS/NTP Director (2023–2024), and chaired the Board of Scientific Counselors (2020–2022) for the National Toxicology Program. He was Chair of the Health Effects Institute Research Committee (2010–2018) and President of the Society of Toxicology (2001–2002) and the Academy of Toxicological Sciences (2025–2026).

== Awards and recognition ==
- Fellow, American Association for the Advancement of Science (1995)
- Fellow, Academy of Toxicological Sciences (2000)
- Public Communications Award, Society of Toxicology (2014)
- Excellence in Pharmacology/Toxicology Lifetime Award, PhRMA Foundation (2015)
- David Rall Medal, National Academy of Medicine (2020)
- Merit Award, Society of Toxicology (2024)

== Selected publications ==
- Eaton, D. L., & Groopman, J. D. (Eds.). (1994). The Toxicology of Aflatoxins: Human Health, Veterinary, and Agricultural Significance. Academic Press. ISBN 978-0122282553.
- Ramsdell, H. S., & Eaton, D. L. (1990). Species differences in aflatoxin B1 metabolism in hepatic microsomes and hepatocytes from monkey, rat, mouse, and chicken. Toxicol. Appl. Pharmacol., 105(2), 216–225.
- Gallagher, E. P., Wienkers, L. C., Stapleton, P. L., Kunze, K. L., & Eaton, D. L. (1994). Role of human microsomal cytochrome P4503A4 and 1A2 in the bioactivation of aflatoxin B1. Cancer Research, 54(1), 101–108.
- Eaton, D. L., & Bammler, T. K. (1999). Concise review of the glutathione S-transferases and their significance in toxicology. Toxicological Sciences, 49(2), 156–164.
- National Academies of Sciences, Engineering, and Medicine; Eaton, D. L. et al. (Eds.). (2018). Public Health Consequences of E-Cigarettes. The National Academies Press. ISBN 978-0309468336.
- Chang, S.-Y., Weber, E. J., Sidorenko, V. S., Chapron, A., Yeung, C. K., Gao, C., Mao, Q., Shen, D., Wang, J., Rosenquist, T. A., Dickman, K. G., Grollman, A. P., *Kelly, E. J., Himmelfarb, J., & Eaton, D. L. (2017). Human liver-kidney microphysiological system for quantum dot toxicity testing and aristolochic acid nephrotoxicity modeling. JCI Insight, 2(6), e91320
- Omenn GS & Eaton DL. (2022). The Risk Assessment-Risk Management Paradigm. IN: M. Robson and WA Toscano, Ed. Risk Assessment for Environmental Health, 2nd Edition, Chapter 2, John Wiley &amp; Sons, New York. (Sponsored by The Association of Schools of Public Health (ASPH).
- Eaton DL & Cui J. (2023) "Biotransformation of Xenobiotics ", in Patty's Industrial Hygiene and Toxicology, 7th Edition, Ed. D. Paustenbach, J. Klaunig, L. Levy & H. Greim, Wiley Press. e91320
- Eaton, DL, *Vandivort, TC & Gallagher, EP. (2025). Introduction to the Principles of Toxicology, In: Comprehensive Toxicology, C. McQueen, Editor, Elsevier Sciences, Vol. 1, General Principles, 4 th, Edition, Chap. 1, 2025.
- Eaton, D. L., Goldstein, B. D. & Henifin, M. S. (2025). Reference Guide on Toxicology. In Reference Manual on Scientific Evidence (4th ed., pp. 1027-1104–686). National Academies Press / Federal Judicial Center.
