= Germaine Buck Louis =

American epidemiologist

Dr. Germaine M. Buck Louis

Dean of George Mason University College of Health and Human Services

Personal details
- Education: State University of New York at Buffalo

Germaine M. Buck Louis was the Dean of the George Mason University College of Health and Human Services and professor in Mason’s Department of Global and Community Health. She led the College in becoming Virginia's first accredited College of Public Health prior to her retirement in 2022. Her expertise focuses on environmental exposures and human health, particularly human reproduction and pregnancy. Prior to her appointment as dean at George Mason in 2017, she was the Director for the Division of Intramural Population Health Research at the Eunice Kennedy Shriver National Institute of Child Health and Human Development.

== Education ==
Buck Louis earned her BA in medical sociology, and her MS and PhD in epidemiology at the State University of New York at Buffalo.

== Academics ==
Buck Louis started at Mason in 2017 as a professor and Dean of the George Mason University College of Health and Human Services, simultaneously.

Her research focuses on the impact of environmental influences, particularly endocrine disruptors, air pollution and lifestyle, on human fecundity and fertility. Previously, she was a tenured professor in the Department of Social and Preventive Medicine at University of Buffalo, School of Medicine and Biomedical Sciences. She taught both graduate and medical school classes. Buck Louis was elected president of the Society for Pediatric and Perinatal Epidemiologic Research while on faculty at University of Buffalo.

== Nursing and research ==
Buck Louis trained and worked as a registered nurse at Millard Fillmore Hospital. In 2000, she became a Senior Investigator and Chief of the Epidemiology Branch at the Eunice Kennedy Shriver National Institute of Child Health and Human Development (NICHD). She went on to become the Director for the Division of Intramural Population Health Research at the NICHD and principal investigator for the LIFE Study, ENDO Study and NICHD Fetal Growth Studies before joining Mason.

Buck Louis currently serves on the Board on Environmental Studies and Toxicology, National Academies of Sciences, Engineering and Medicine, and on the Board for the American College of Epidemiology.

== Selected works ==
Buck Louis co-edited the textbook Reproductive and Perinatal Epidemiology. She has also published a number of scientific papers and technical reports. A few publications include:

- Buck Louis, Germaine M.; Kannan, Kurunthachalam; Sapra, Katherine J.; Maisog, José; Sundaram, Rajeshwari (2014-12-15). "Urinary concentrations of benzophenone-type ultraviolet radiation filters and couples' fecundity". American Journal of Epidemiology. 180 (12): 1168–1175. doi:10.1093/aje/kwu285. ISSN 1476-6256. PMC 4262441. PMID 25395025.
- Buck Louis, Germaine M.; Sapra, Katherine J.; Schisterman, Enrique F.; Lynch, Courtney D.; Maisog, José M.; Grantz, Katherine L.; Sundaram, Rajeshwari (2016). "Lifestyle and pregnancy loss in a contemporary cohort of women recruited before conception: The LIFE Study". Fertility and Sterility. 106 (1): 180–188. doi:10.1016/j.fertnstert.2016.03.009. ISSN 1556-5653. PMC 4930884. PMID 27016456.
- Buck Louis, Germaine M.; Smarr, Melissa M.; Sun, Liping; Chen, Zhen; Honda, Masato; Wang, Wei; Karthikraj, Rajendiran; Weck, Jennifer; Kannan, Kurunthachalam (2018). "Endocrine disrupting chemicals in seminal plasma and couple fecundity". Environmental Research. 163: 64–70. Bibcode:2018ER....163...64B. doi:10.1016/j.envres.2018.01.028. ISSN 1096-0953. PMC 5878734. PMID 29426029.
- Buck Louis, Germaine M.; Zhai, Shuyan; Smarr, Melissa M.; Grewal, Jagteshwar; Zhang, Cuilin; Grantz, Katherine L.; Hinkle, Stefanie N.; Sundaram, Rajeshwari; Lee, Sunmi; Honda, Masato; Oh, JungKeun (October 2018). "Endocrine disruptors and neonatal anthropometry, NICHD Fetal Growth Studies - Singletons". Environment International. 119: 515–526. Bibcode:2018EnInt.119..515B. doi:10.1016/j.envint.2018.07.024. ISSN 1873-6750. PMC 6267852. PMID 30055518.
