= Marjorie G. Horning =

American biochemist and pharmacologist (1917–2020)

- Born: Marjorie Janice Groothuis; August 23, 1917; Detroit, Michigan, US
- Died: June 11, 2020 (aged 102); Houston, Texas, US
- Education: Goucher College, University of Michigan
- Awards: Garvan–Olin Medal (1977)
- Scientific career
- Fields: Biochemistry, Pharmacology
- Workplaces: National Institutes of Health, Baylor College of Medicine

Marjorie Janice Groothuis Horning (August 23, 1917 – June 11, 2020) was an American biochemist and pharmacologist. She was considered to be a pioneer of chromatography for her work in developing new techniques and applying them to the study of drug metabolism. She demonstrated that drugs and their metabolites can be transferred from a pregnant woman to her developing child, and later through breast milk, from a mother to a baby. Horning's work made possible the prevention of birth defects, as doctors began to warn of the dangers of drugs, alcohol, and smoking during pregnancy.

== Early life and education ==
Marjorie Janice Groothuis was born in August 1917 in Detroit, Michigan, to Nina Jane Potter and Herman Groothuis. She studied at Goucher College in Baltimore, Maryland, graduating with a Bachelor of Arts in 1938. She then attended the University of Michigan, graduating with a Master of Science in 1940 and a Doctor of Philosophy in 1943.

She worked as a research assistant in the pediatrics department of the University of Michigan Hospital until 1945.

== Career ==
Horning moved with her husband to the University of Pennsylvania in Philadelphia, Pennsylvania, in 1945, working there until 1951.

In 1950, Evan was appointed Chief of the Laboratory of the Chemistry of Natural Products of the National Institutes of Health (NIH) in Bethesda, Maryland. In 1951, Marjorie obtained a position as a research chemist at the National Heart Institute at NIH. She remained there until 1961.

In 1961, the couple moved to Baylor College of Medicine in Houston, Texas. Marjorie became an associate research professor at the Lipid Research Center at Baylor. She became a full professor of biochemistry at the Institute for Lipid Research at Baylor College in 1969.

In 1973, Atmospheric Pressure Chemical Ionization (APCI) first reported using a 63Ni foil and corona discharge by Evan and Marjorie Horning of Baylor College of Medicine.

In 1974, Corona discharge at atmospheric pressure. DLI with effluent introduced directly from an LC column with APCI using 63Ni foil/corona discharge source, reported by Evan and Marjorie Horning, Baylor College of Medicine.

In 1981, she became an adjunct professor of biochemistry and biophysics at the University of Houston, held concurrently with her position at Baylor.

She worked on the editorial boards of Drug Metabolism and Disposition, Analytical Chemistry, Toxicology and Applied Pharmacology, the Journal of Chromatography, Trends in Pharmacological Sciences and Biopharmaceutics and Drug Disposition.

In 1984, Horning became the first woman president of the American Society for Pharmacology and Experimental Therapeutics (ASPET). She had previously served as secretary-treasurer from 1981 to 1982. She was a member of the American Association for the Advancement of Science.

== Research ==
Horning published more than 200 scientific articles about biochemistry, pharmacology, and analytical chemistry.

Marjorie and Evan Horning were pioneers in the field of analytical biochemistry, in the application of gas chromatography, mass spectrometry, and gas and liquid-mass spectrometric analysis. They developed revolutionary techniques to study the metabolism of drugs and track breakdown products of drugs as they transform and travel throughout the body. Marjorie helped to develop new methods of chromatographic analysis for the study of drug metabolism, including procedures for metabolic profiling and for the study of adrenocortical steroids.

Horning investigated the metabolism of drugs and their metabolites in humans, with particular attention to prenatal transmission between a pregnant woman and an embryo or fetus. Her work showed that drugs and their degradation products travel between mother and child and can affect the unborn child. Previous to her research, it had been believed that the placenta acted as a barrier. Her work resulted in changes in medical practice and the prevention of drug-related birth defects. As a result of her work, doctors in the 1980s began to warn women about the risks of taking medications, drinking alcohol, and smoking during pregnancy. Horning also determined that drugs and their metabolites can be passed from mother to child through breast milk.

She was a long-term member of the Society of Toxicology and worked with the National Toxicology Program, established in 1978 to identify toxic chemicals. Over 48,000 chemicals were used in the United States at the time, many in food additives, medicinal products, or household products.

== Awards and honors ==
- Frank H. Field and Joe L. Franklin Award in Mass Spectrometry, American Chemical Society, shared with Evan C. Horning, 1990
- Tswett Chromatography Medal, International Symposium on Advances in Chromatography 1987
- National Honorary Member of Iota Sigma Pi (National Honor Society for Women in Chemistry), 1985
- Alumnae Athena award, University of Michigan, 1980
- Garvan-Olin Medal, American Chemical Society, 1977
- Honorary doctorate, Goucher College, 1977
- Warner Lambert award, American Association of Clinical Chemists, 1976

== Personal life ==
While a student at the University of Michigan, she met her husband-to-be, Evan C. Horning (1916–1993), a chemist and teacher. They married on September 26, 1942.

Following her retirement in 1987, Marjorie Horning found more time to pursue her passion for art. She became an elected Trustee of the Museum of Fine Arts, Houston in 1988, and later a Life Trustee in 2000.

The Hornings traveled widely for scientific conferences and collected art on many of these trips. Along with their friends Virginia and Ira Jackson, they provided early leadership of the Prints and Drawings Department at the MFAH, and Marjorie and Evan later donated their entire collection of over 300 Old Master and Modern prints and drawings to the Museum. Asian Art was another focus of their collecting, especially important Japanese woodblock prints. During the late 1950s and early 1960s, the Hornings had yearly residences in Denmark, Sweden, and Finland, and collected decorative arts that later transformed the Museum's Scandinavian design collection. Ever thoughtful philanthropists, the Hornings also established generous endowments to support these core collecting interests.
