= Cuilin Zhang =

Chinese epidemiologist and physician-scientist

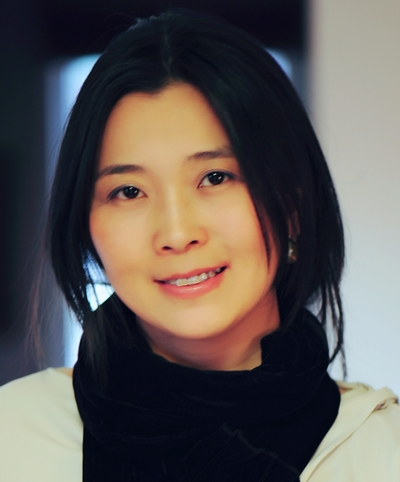
- Education: Beijing Medical University; University of Washington School of Public Health
- Scientific career
- Fields: Epidemiology
- Workplaces: Harvard T.H. Chan School of Public Health; Eunice Kennedy Shriver National Institute of Child Health and Human Development
- Thesis: Variants in the Lipoprotein Lipase Gene and Paraoxonase Gene and Risk of Preeclampsia (2003)
- Doctoral advisor: Michelle Ann Williams

Cuilin Zhang is a Chinese-American epidemiologist and physician-scientist researching the roles of genetic and environmental factors in the pathogenesis of gestational diabetes, type 2 diabetes, and obesity and health consequences of these complications. Zhang is a senior investigator and acting chief of the epidemiology branch at the Eunice Kennedy Shriver National Institute of Child Health and Human Development.

== Education ==
Zhang completed a M.D. at Beijing Medical University in 1993. She earned a M.P.H. (1999) and Ph.D. in epidemiology (2004) at the University of Washington School of Public Health. Zhang's dissertation was titled Variants in the Lipoprotein Lipase Gene and Paraoxonase Gene and Risk of Preeclampsia. Her doctoral advisor was Michelle Ann Williams. Zhang received postdoctoral training in genetic and nutritional epidemiology at Harvard University.

== Career ==
Zhang worked as a research scientist at the Harvard T.H. Chan School of Public Health. In 2007, she joined the Eunice Kennedy Shriver National Institute of Child Health and Human Development (NICHD) in 2007. Zhang is a tenure-track senior investigator and the acting chief of the epidemiology branch.

== Research ==
Zhang's research interest is at the interface of genetic and non-genetic biological markers and potentially modifiable exogenous factors, focusing on their interplay in relation to the development of complex diseases. More specifically, her current research activities focus primarily on the roles of genetic and environmental factors in the pathogenesis of gestational diabetes, type 2 diabetes, and obesity and health consequences of these complications. Zhang also has long-standing research interests in fetal origins of chronic diseases, life course epidemiology, and modifications of diet and lifestyle to improve reproductive outcomes and child health.

Zhang serves as the principal investigator of the diabetes and women's health study, which is a retrospective cohort study of approximately 4,000 women from U.S. and Denmark who had diabetes in pregnancy and have been followed up for at least 10 years. These women will be prospectively followed up for an additional four years to collect updated information on major environmental factors and timed biospecimens. The study is focusing on the identification of determinants (medical, lifestyle, genetic and their interactions) for the progression from gestational diabetes to type 2 diabetes and its complications and the investigation of biochemical markers that may predict the development of these complications among the pre-diabetic population. The results of one of Zhang's studies suggests that physical activity and a healthy diet may prevent the occurrence of type 2 diabetes in women who are at a heightened risk. A study Zhang led found that women who have had gestational diabetes may be able to reduce or even eliminate their elevated risk for cardiovascular disease by following a healthy lifestyle in the years after giving birth. Zhang and her team analyzed data from the Nurses' Health Study, which followed health habits and medical history of more than 90,000 women from before pregnancy through middle age and the early senior years. The study confirms the links between gestational diabetes and cardiovascular disease found by other studies. It also provides some strong evidence that cardiovascular disease after gestational diabetes is not inevitable for women who adopt a healthy diet, maintain a healthy weight, exercise moderately, and do not smoke. In this study, the researchers found that women who failed to adopt a healthy lifestyle in the wake of gestational diabetes had a 43 percent higher risk for cardiovascular disease, particularly heart attack and stroke.

Zhang is also the principal investigator of the investigation of the risk factors and pathogenesis of gestational diabetes using biospecimens longitudinally collected from prospective pregnancy cohorts. Currently, the study focuses on a comprehensive panel of biochemical markers and epigenetic markers that are putatively implicated in glucose homeostasis, fetal growth, or both. Non-targeted metabolomics will also be analyzed for the discovery of new pathways and/or biochemical markers related to glucose intolerance and subsequent adverse fetal outcomes. In one of Zhang's studies, her findings suggested that a diet rich in potatoes could potentially increase the risk of gestational diabetes.

Zhang has published a number of papers and book chapters focusing on the determinants of gestational diabetes, preeclampsia, type 2 diabetes and its complications, and obesity including genetic factors, diet and lifestyle factors, and biochemical markers. In 2018, Zhang and her team's research explored factors increasing the chances of macrosomia. In 2020, she contributed to research led by Xiang Gao and Muzi Na that investigated possible connections between restless legs syndrome during pregnancy and race and ethnicity.

== Personal life ==
Zhang plays the guqin.

== Selected works ==
- Zhang, Cuilin; Solomon, Caren G.; Manson, JoAnn E.; Hu, Frank B. (March 2006). "A Prospective Study of Pregravid Physical Activity and Sedentary Behaviors in Relation to the Risk for Gestational Diabetes Mellitus". Archives of Internal Medicine. 166 (5): 543–548. doi:10.1001/archinte.166.5.543. ISSN 0003-9926. PMID 16534041.
- Zhang, Cuilin; Rexrode, Kathryn M.; van Dam, Rob M.; Li, Tricia Y.; Hu, Frank B. (April 2008). "Abdominal Obesity and the Risk of All-Cause, Cardiovascular, and Cancer Mortality: Sixteen Years of Follow-Up in US Women". Circulation. 117 (13): 1658–1667. doi:10.1161/CIRCULATIONAHA.107.739714. ISSN 0009-7322. PMID 18362231.
- Zhang, Cuilin; Qiu, Chunfang; Hu, Frank B.; David, Robert M.; van Dam, Rob M.; Bralley, Alexander; Williams, Michelle A. (November 2008). Westermark, Per (ed.). "Maternal Plasma 25-Hydroxyvitamin D Concentrations and the Risk for Gestational Diabetes Mellitus". PLoS ONE. 3 (11) e3753. Bibcode:2008PLoSO...3.3753Z. doi:10.1371/journal.pone.0003753. ISSN 1932-6203. PMC 2582131. PMID 19015731.
- Zhang, Cuilin; Ning, Yi (December 2011). "Effect of dietary and lifestyle factors on the risk of gestational diabetes: review of epidemiologic evidence". The American Journal of Clinical Nutrition. 94 (suppl_6): 1975S–1979S. doi:10.3945/ajcn.110.001032. ISSN 0002-9165. PMC 3364079. PMID 21613563.
