= Larry Robertson =

Larry Robertson may refer to:

- Larry Robertson (bishop)
- Larry Robertson (toxicologist)

== See also ==
- Laurence Robertson, British politician
- Lawrence Bruce Robertson, Canadian surgeon
