= Katrina B. Goddard =

American genetic epidemiologist and biostatistician

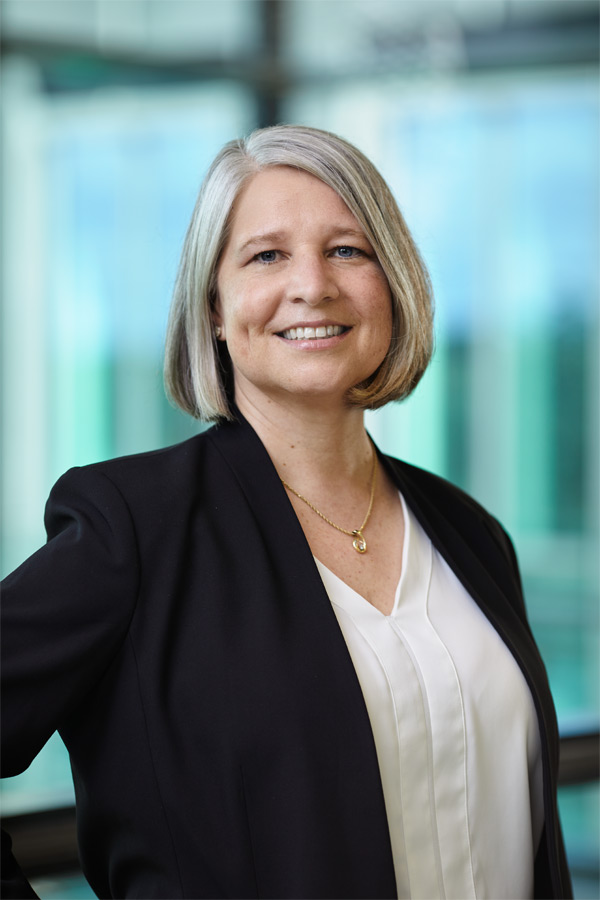
- Goddard in 2021
- Born: Katrina Ann Blouke; June 1969 (age 57)
- Education: University of Wisconsin–Madison; University of Washington School of Public Health
- Spouse: Shawn Goddard
- Scientific career
- Workplaces: Case Western Reserve University; Kaiser Permanente Center for Health Research; National Cancer Institute
- Thesis: Study Design Issues in the Analysis of Complex Genetic Traits (1999)
- Doctoral advisor: Ellen M. Wijsman

Katrina Blouke Goddard (born June 1969) is an American genetic epidemiologist and biostatistician specializing in public health genomics and the translation of genomic applications into clinical practice. Goddard is the director of the division of cancer control and population sciences (DCCPS) at the National Cancer Institute (NCI). She was previously the distinguished investigator and director of translational and applied genomics at the Kaiser Permanente Center for Health Research and a faculty member at Case Western Reserve University.

== Education ==
Katrina Ann Blouke was born in June 1969 to Morley and Kay Blouke. She completed a B.S. in molecular biology at the University of Wisconsin–Madison in 1990. Goddard graduated with honors and was a member of Alpha Chi Sigma. She earned a M.S. (1995) and a Ph.D. (1999) in biostatistics at the University of Washington School of Public Health. Her dissertation was titled Study Design Issues in the Analysis of Complex Genetic Traits. Her doctoral advisor was Ellen M. Wijsman.

== Career ==
Goddard is a genetic epidemiologist who focuses on public health genomics and the translation of genomic applications into clinical practice. From 1999 to 2007, Goddard was part of the faculty in the department of epidemiology and biostatistics at Case Western Reserve University. Goddard was a mid-career fellow at the Centers for Disease Control and Prevention in Genetics & Public Health Research and Practice from 2006 to 2007.

In 2007, Goddard joined the Kaiser Permanente Center for Health Research in Portland, Oregon as a distinguished investigator and director of translational and applied genomics. She directed or collaborated on over 25 federally funded research studies and has held numerous leadership positions on national research consortia. While at Kaiser Permanente, Goddard was the founding director for the NW Biobank, and she was a principal investigator (PI) of the Cancer Health Assessments Reaching Many (CHARM) study as part of the National Human Genome Research Institute (NHGRI)-funded Clinical Sequencing Evidence-Generating Research (CSER) consortium, which has an overarching goal of investigating the integration of genome-scale sequencing into clinical care for diverse and medically underserved individuals. Goddard was the site PI of the Kaiser Permanente Northwest partner site for the NCI-DCEG Connect for Cancer Prevention Study (Connect), a new prospective cohort seeking to enroll 200,000 adults in the United States from nine integrated health care systems and designed to further investigate the etiology of cancer and its outcomes.

Goddard has served on the board of directors of the American Society of Human Genetics and the International Genetic Epidemiology Society.

In October 2021, Goddard was appointed director of the division of cancer control and population sciences (DCCPS) at the National Cancer Institute (NCI). In this position, she oversees a division that covers a wide range of scientific domains and disciplines, including epidemiology, behavioral science, surveillance and statistics, cancer survivorship, and health services and outcomes research.
