= Health Effects Institute =

Non-profit organization

- Abbreviation: HEI
- Formation: 1980; 46 years ago
- Type: Nonprofit
- Tax ID no.: 04-2708045
- Legal status: 501(c)(3)
- Headquarters: Boston, Massachusetts
- Board Chair: Richard A. Meserve
- President: Dr. Elena Craft
- Affiliations: HEI Energy
- Website: https://www.healtheffects.org/

The Health Effects Institute (HEI) is an independent, non-profit corporation specializing in research on the health effects of air pollution. It is headquartered in Boston, Massachusetts, United States.

== History ==
HEI was founded in 1980 with Archibald Cox as the founding chair of the organization. Typically, HEI receives half of its core funds from the worldwide motor vehicle industry and half from the United States Environmental Protection Agency. Other public and private organizations periodically support special projects or certain research programs. To accomplish its mission, HEI's roles are:

- to identify the highest priority areas for health effects research
- to fund and oversee research activities
- to provide intensive independent review of HEI-support and related research
- to integrate HEI's research results with those of other institutions into broader evaluations
- to communicate its findings to industry, policy makers, and the public

HEI has funded over 250 studies in North America, Europe, and Asia that have produced research to inform decisions on carbon monoxide, air toxics, nitrogen oxides, diesel exhaust, ozone, particulate matter, and other pollutants. The results of these endeavors have been published in over 200 Research Reports and Special Reports which are available electronically free of charge on the HEI website or in print form. At the urging of the World Health Organization and countries throughout the world, HEI has extended its international research to help inform air quality decisions in Europe, Asia, and Latin America. From 2010 to 2018, toxicologist David L. Eaton served as Chair of the HEI Research Committee, guiding the evaluation and funding of air pollution and health research studies.

All project results and HEI Commentaries are widely communicated through HEI's home page, Annual Conferences, publications, and presentations to legislative bodies and public agencies.

== Organizational structure ==
An independent Board of Directors consists of leaders in science and policy who are committed to the public-private partnership model.

The Health Research Committee works with the scientific staff to develop the Five-Year Strategic Plan with input from HEI's sponsors and other interested parties, select research projects for funding, and oversee their conduct.

The Health Review Committee, which has no role in selecting or overseeing studies, works with staff to evaluate and interpret the results of funded studies and related research.
