= Ann Linnea Sandberg =

American immunologist (1938–2009)

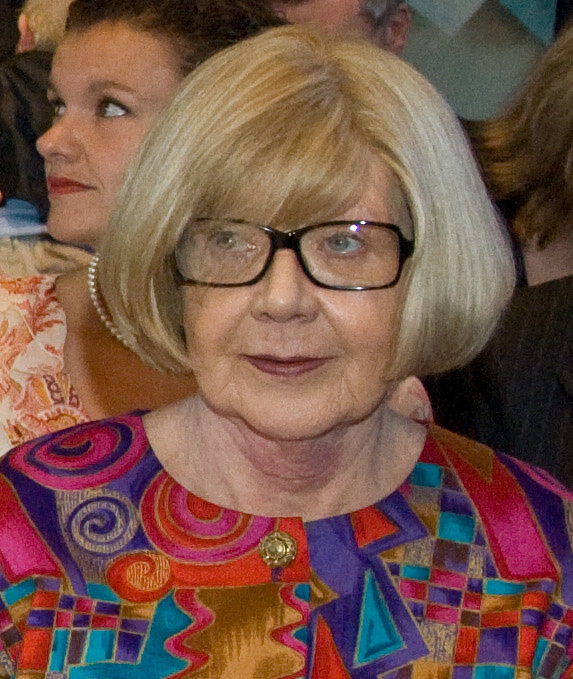
- Born: August 4, 1938; Denver, Colorado, U.S.
- Died: December 31, 2009 (aged 71); Livingston, Montana
- Education: Montana State University (BS); University of Chicago (PhD)
- Scientific career
- Workplaces: National Institute of Dental and Craniofacial Research
- Thesis: Characterization and modification of irradiation induced aging in mice (1964)
- Doctoral advisor: John Doull

Ann Linnea Sandberg (August 4, 1938 – December 31, 2009) was an American immunologist and the acting director of the Center for Integrative Craniofacial Research at the National Institute of Dental and Craniofacial Research (NIDCR). Previously, Sandberg was a lab chief and researcher for 23 years in the NIH Intramural Research Program at NIDCR.

== Early life and education ==
Ann Linnea Sandberg was born on August 4, 1938, in Denver, Colorado, to Ernest Helsing Sandberg and Anna Elvira Sandberg, née Jackson. She had a brother. Her family later moved to Bozeman, Montana. She earned a Bachelor of Science in chemistry from Montana State University. Sandberg completed a doctor of philosophy in pharmacology at University of Chicago in 1964. Her dissertation was titled Characterization and modification of irradiation induced aging in mice. Her doctoral advisor was John Doull. D. G. Oldfield helped Sandberg derive the formula for the calibration of the neutron source and assisted with the mathematical analyses of the mortality data in her doctoral research. Dragoslava Vesselinovitch and Frank W. Fitch provided histological examination of the tissues used in Sandberg's dissertation and H. D. Landahl assisted her with the computer analyses. She received traineeship support form the United States Public Health Service. Sandberg completed postdoctoral research at Tufts University School of Medicine from 1964 to 1968.

== Career ==
Sandberg held a joint appointment as a research investigator at the New York City Health Department and a research assistant professor at New York University School of Medicine. In 1972, joined the National Institute of Dental Research (NIDCR) as chief of the Humoral Immunity Section of the Laboratory of Microbiology and Immunology. In 1988, she was named chief of the microbial receptors and pathogenesis section, Laboratory of Microbial Ecology. She made noteworthy contributions to the biomedical literature on innate immunity, bacterial activation of neutrophils and infective endocarditis.

After 23 years with the NIH Intramural Research Program, she joined the institute's extramural program in 1995 as chief of the Neoplastic Diseases Branch and was subsequently promoted to lead the Division of Basic and Translational Sciences. Throughout her career, Sandberg also mentored and supported the career development of multiple students, young investigators and postdoctoral fellows. She was acting director of the Center for Integrative Craniofacial Research at the time of her retirement in 2005. She was a member of the American Association for the Advancement of Science and the International Association for Dental Research.

=== Research ===
Sandberg researched inflammation and host defense mechanisms pertaining to autoimmune diseases. She was regarded as an expert on complement activating enzymes and inflammatory diseases. Sandberg also researched microbial adhesion. Sandberg investigated alternate pathways for activation of the cascading sequence of then relatively unknown complement proteins, now recognized to be instrumental in innate and adaptive immunity.

== Awards and honors ==
Sandberg was recognized with a Montana State University Centennial Alumnae Award. She received several NIH awards including the Merit Award, Special Achievement Award and the Special Act Award.

== Personal life ==
Sandberg was involved with the Emmanuel Lutheran Church in Bethesda, Maryland and attended their Bible study discussion groups. She had a cabin at Flathead Lake. Sandberg loved her family, literature, music and gardening; after retirement she had reignited her passion for piano lessons. She died on December 31, 2009, at Seeds of Love Care in Livingston, Montana. Sandberg was survived by her sister-in-law, four nieces, and five grand-nephews. She was cremated at Franzen-Davis Crematory.

== Selected work ==
- Oliveira, Benedito; Shin, Hyun S.; Osler, Abraham G.; Sandberg, Ann L. (February 1970). "The Biologic Activities of Guinea Pig Antibodies: II. Modes of Complement Interaction with γ1 and γ2 Immunoglobulins". The Journal of Immunology. 104 (2): 329–334. doi:10.4049/jimmunol.104.2.320. PMID 4189670. S2CID 255328546.
- Osler, Abraham G.; Oliveira, Benedito; Sandberg, Ann L. (January 1971). "Two Complement Interaction Sites in Guinea Pig Immunoglobulins". The Journal of Immunology. 106 (1): 282–285. doi:10.4049/jimmunol.106.1.282. PMID 5543721. S2CID 22734735.
- Osler, Abraham G.; Sandberg, Ann L. (November 1971). "Dual Pathways of Complement Interaction with Guinea Pig Immunoglobulins". The Journal of Immunology. 107 (5): 1268–1273. doi:10.4049/jimmunol.107.5.1268. PMID 5117668. S2CID 30690514.
- Raisz, Lawrence G.; Sandberg, A. L.; Goodson, J. M.; Simmons, H. A.; Mergenhagen, S. E. (August 1974). "Complement-Dependent Stimulation of Prostaglandin Synthesis and Bone Resorption". Science. 185 (4153): 789–791. Bibcode:1974Sci...185..789R. doi:10.1126/science.185.4153.789. PMID 4843377. S2CID 6491957.
- Wahl, L. M.; Olsen, C. E.; Sandberg, A. L.; Mergenhagen, S. E. (November 1977). "Prostaglandin regulation of macrophage collagenase production". Proceedings of the National Academy of Sciences. 74 (11): 4955–4958. Bibcode:1977PNAS...74.4955W. doi:10.1073/pnas.74.11.4955. PMC 432076. PMID 200941.
- Raisz, Lawrence G.; Simmons, Hollis A.; Sandberg, Ann L.; Canalis, Ernesto (July 1980). "lDirect Stimulation of Bone Resorption by Epidermal Growth Factor*". Endocrinology. 107 (1): 270–273. doi:10.1210/endo-107-1-270. PMID 6966568.
