= Luthe =

Luthe or Lüthe is a German language surname. It stems from the male given name Ludwig – and may refer to:

- Andreas Luthe (1987), German professional footballer
- Claus Luthe (1932–2008), German car designer
- Gregor Luthe (1970), German chemist, toxicologist, nanotechnologist, inventor and entrepreneur
- Hubert Luthe (1927–2014), German Catholic bishop
- Marcel Luthe (1977), german politician and journalist
- Josephine M. Luthe (19th-century), American lawyer
- Wolfgang Luthe (1922–1985), German physician and psychotherapist
