= Kathleen Weston =

American medical researcher and educator

- Born: Kathleen Shingler; March 26, 1907; Kenton, Michigan, U.S.
- Died: January 11, 2016 (aged 108); Grosse Pointe, Michigan, U.S.
- Education: B.Sc., M.Sc., M.D.
- Alma mater: Northern Michigan University; University of Michigan; Temple University Medical School
- Known for: Medical researcher and educator
- Spouse(s): Jean K. Weston, M.D.

Kathleen Weston, M.D., (née Shingler, March 26, 1907 – January 11, 2016) was a leader in medical research and teaching, as well as a trailblazer for women in the medical profession.

== Early life ==
Weston was born Kathleen Shingler in Kenton, Michigan. Her father, William Shingler, was a general store keeper and her mother, Ednah Shingler, was a schoolteacher. She had three siblings. Her two brothers were Keith (born in 1905), and William (born in 1908). Her sister, whom she was closest to, was Ruth (born 1912).

Weston attended Kenton High School, which was combined with the elementary school. There were only 15 students attending the school at the time. Weston was one of two graduating students.

Weston did her undergraduate degree at Northern State Normal School (now Northern Michigan University). She was originally majoring in physical education since she was so active, but did not like it. She switched to a major in biology and graduated in 1929. Weston went on to become one NMU’s first female graduates to complete a medical degree. It was at NMU that Weston met her future husband, Jean K. Weston.

== Career ==
Her degree in biology kick-started her teaching career, which lasted for over 50 years. Weston's first teaching experience was at the high school level. She taught biology at Munising High School in Michigan.

Weston continued her education when her husband enrolled in graduate school at the University of Michigan. Weston followed her husband and completed her master's degree in anatomy and genetics, graduating in 1934 at the age of 30. It was at the University of Michigan that Weston's interest in research was piqued.

Weston was offered a position teaching an anatomy and physiology course in 1938 at Temple University Medical School in Philadelphia, where her husband was studying for his doctor of medicine degree. She taught for more than a decade, moving onto teaching a variety of medical courses. Eventually, she felt she needed to attend the school herself to be able to better deliver the courses. The dean, knowing how skilled she was at teaching, made her a deal. If she could teach the nursing students to pass their board exams, she could attend the medical school. In 1951, at the age of 44, Weston received her M.D. from Temple University with honours. She was one of only 5 women in the graduating class of 125 students.

In the 1950s, Weston began working on what she considered her top scientific achievement, the Salk polio vaccine, which truly launched her career in toxicology. Weston was hired by the pharmaceutical giant Parke-Davis and Company due to her experience with microscopes and the nervous system. Not only was Weston the first female doctor hired by the company, she had also convinced the company to pay her the same salary as the male medical doctors, which was a significant increase to other women in the field were paid. She was also the first woman to eat in the company's executive dining room.

Parke-Davis was one of six pharmaceutical companies commercially producing the Salk polio vaccine for children. For three years Weston worked on this project, directing infectious control tests of the vaccine to ensure no live virus was present. She then became head of the company's toxicology laboratory in Michigan where she remained for 10 years.

Following the commercialization of the polio vaccine, Weston and her husband moved to New York where she worked as a toxicologist. Weston worked for Burroughs-Wellcome & Co. as well as at Brookdale Hospital Medical Center where she practiced as Chief of Toxicology.

In 1968 Weston and her husband created Weston Consultants, Inc., out of Virginia, which they operated until 1981. Weston's area of expertise was animal toxicity in pesticides and drugs. Their consulting firm became a leader in toxicology analysis for clients such as General Motors, the National Institute of Mental Health, and the Environmental Protection Agency. She was also able to serve as a legal expert in court on cases involving toxicology. In the late 1970s Weston returned to the classroom for a period of time as a professor at the Georgetown University and George Washington University medical schools in Washington DC. Only at the age of 90, in 1997, did Weston retire from her role as a consulting toxicologist.

== Personal life ==
Weston married Jean K. Weston while they were studying together at the University of Michigan Medical School. Their marriage date was August 23, 1933. They were married for over 51 years, until his death on March 2, 1985, and had two children together.

Weston and her husband established the Jean and Kathleen (Shingler) Weston Scholarship in 1985. This scholarship is available annually to students at Northern Michigan University. The number of awards and the amount varies yearly. The award is given to students with in good academic standing with financial need who are studying sciences and are residents of Kenton, Sidnaw, Trout Creek, or the Upper Peninsula area of Michigan.

After her retirement, Weston dedicated her time to the Kenton Historical Society where she helped document the history of her hometown. At the age of 100 she moved in with her son, where she continued to read and educate herself until her death.

== Death ==
Kathleen Shingler Weston, M.D., died on January 11, 2016, at the age of 108. She passed of natural causes in Grosse Pointe, Michigan. She is survived by her two children, four grandchildren and two great-grandchildren.

== Accolades and achievements ==
- Over her long career, Weston became an award-winning author on toxicology articles. She has authored or co-authored 15 professional publications
- A member of the Society of Toxicology for over 50 years and active contributor to the Toxicology Education Foundation
- A member of the American Medical Women's Association
- Was honoured in the house of representatives for her lifelong work at the forefront of medical research in the field of prescription drug toxicology
- Was honoured at the White House by President Lyndon Johnson as one of the nation's “Outstanding Medical Women.”
- Listed in the Who’s Who of American Women since 1969
- Received the Don Franke Award for best article appearing in the Drug Information Journal in 1979
- Received the Distinguished Alumni Award of Northern Michigan University in 1983 for her work in medical research and education
