= Lyonbrotherz =

German electro house DJ and producer duo

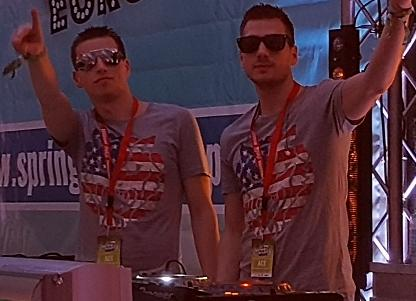
- Lyonbrotherz (Daniel Rolletschek (right), Keven Brüffer (left) at Spring Break Europe 2016

Background information
- Origin: Gronau, North Rhine-Westphalia, Germany
- Genres: Big room house; electro house; progressive house; tech house; future bass
- Years active: 2015–present
- Labels: League of Lyons; I-35 Music
- Members: Daniel Rolletschek; Keven Brüffer
- Website: lyonbrotherz.com

Lyonbrotherz is a German DJ and producer duo formed of cousins Daniel Lyon (born Daniel Rolletschek) and Keven Lyon (born Keven Brüffer). Daniel was born in Ahaus, Germany, on 15 July 1990 and Keven was born in Gronau, Germany, on 19 December 1990. Best known for producing EDM and Hip-hop as well as DJing, the cousins are part of the music production team of I-35 Music and founded the two record labels I-35 Music and League of Lyons.

== Career ==
Starting out at the age of 16, Daniel and Keven began as the duo wanted to stay out of trouble and work towards solving their problems. They first wrote rap and Hip-hop lyrics, learning about beats and going on to produce their own as well as national and international artists. Developing their own music skills, Daniel visited one of the biggest electronic music festivals in Germany and encouraged Keven to begin a new chapter in their careers focussed on Electronic dance music (EDM). This was the beginning of Lyonbrotherz.

In early 2016 they founded their own record label named League of Lyons for EDM releases and the sub label I-35 Music for hip hop productions. In May they DJ-ed on the main stage of Springbreak Europe and in July they produced the soundtrack for an advertising campaign of an international fashion Brand. In 2017 the newcomer DJ and producer Greenskiez signed a contract with their record label League of Lyons.

== Public Image ==
Lyonbrotherz support up-and-coming musicians. They are looking to found their own charity to support the deaf, giving them a chance to hear through implants.

== Discography ==
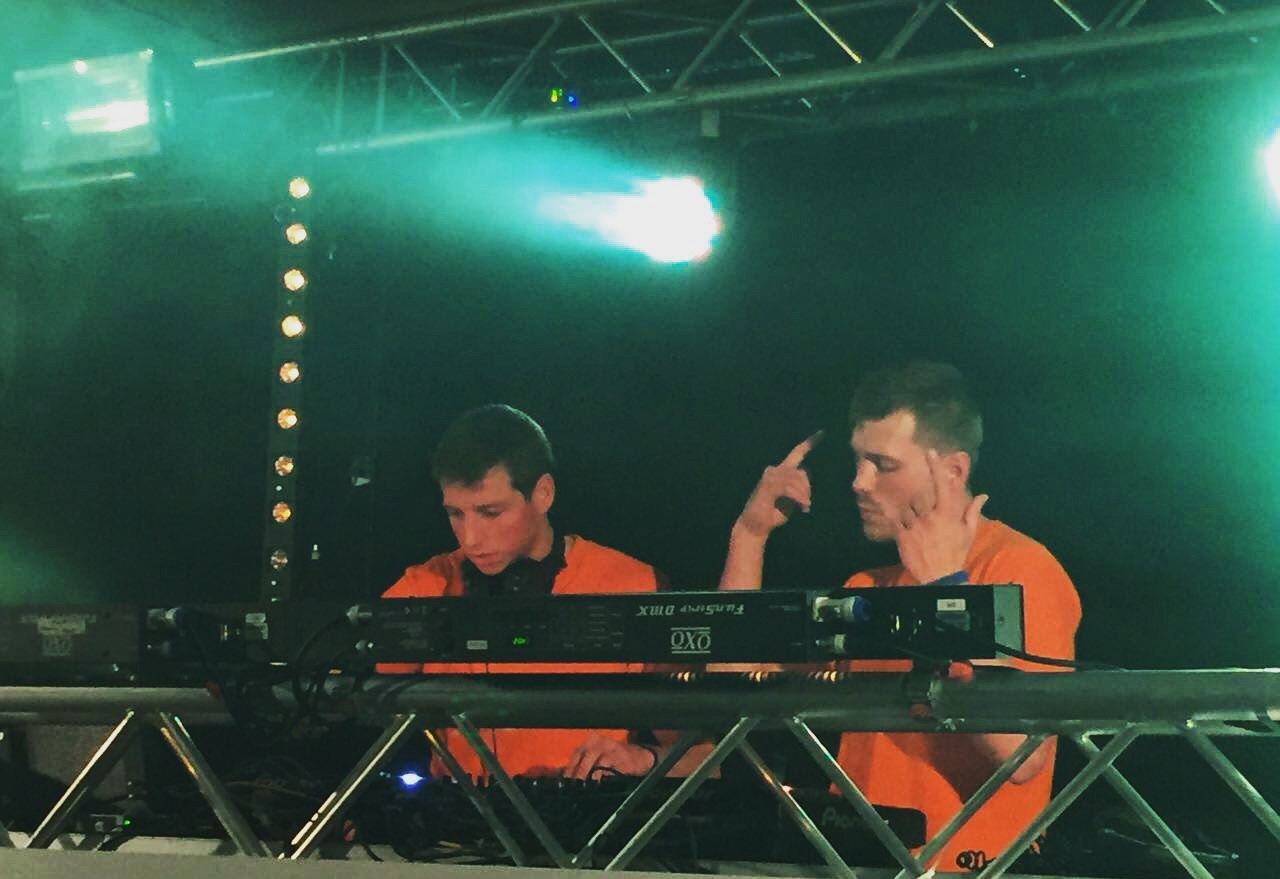
Lyonbrotherz live on stage at Hertie tanzt! in Gronau 2017

=== Singles ===
Title	Year	Record label	Peak positions
Le Luc	2016	I-35 Music	–
World of Fire	2017	League of Lyons	#35 Beatport Charts (Big Room)
Kill	2017	League of Lyons	–
Identity	2018	League of Lyons	–
Circles	2018	League of Lyons	#27 Beatport Charts (Dance)
Sonic	2018	League of Lyons	#55 Beatport Charts (Electro House)
Space (with Greenskiez)	2018	League of Lyons	#56 Beatport Charts (Big Room)
Liberty	2018	League of Lyons	#13 Dance Charts
Hit the Floor (with Greenskiez)	2019	League of Lyons	#35 Beatport Charts (Future House), #34 Dance Charts
Heartstrings (with Pengwin featuring Jay Vallée)	2019	League of Lyons	#70 iTunes Charts Germany, #47 Dance Charts
Different Ways (with Natixx)	2020	League of Lyons	#47 Dance Charts
Same Mistake (with Pengwin & Elle Vee)	2021	Rude Service	–

=== Remixes ===
Title	Year	Original artist(s)	Record label	Peak positions
Heaven (Lyonbrotherz & Ascolta Remix)	2016	Crope	Golden Finger Records	#7 DJ's Magazine Hot Charts #9 DMC Top50 Deejay #15 DJpromo.pl / Top20 Download (World)
