= Genecology =

Branch of ecology

Genecology is a branch of ecology which studies genetic variation of species and communities compared to their population distribution in a particular environment. It is closely related to ecogenetics. Ecogenetics focuses on the relationship between genetics and ecology and species' genetic responses to the environment. Genecology primarily focuses on an ecological perspective, looking at changes and interactions between species. It studies the relationships between genetic variation and environmental gradients within a species. Genecology is often referred to as ecological genetics.

== See also ==
- Ecogenetics
- Race (taxonomy)
