= Gregor Luthe =

- Born: 19 October 1970; Gronau-Epe, North Rhine-Westphalia, Germany
- Citizenship: Germany
- Education: University of Münster, Chemistry (1990–1995; M.A. (Diplom), 1995); Vrije Universiteit Amsterdam, Chemistry (Ph.D. (Dr.), 2003); University of Iowa, Toxicologist (Training by Larry Robertson, 2007)
- Known for: Toxicology of PCBs and PBDEs
- Awards: Marie Curie Fellowship (2002); Feodor Lynen Research Fellowship of the Alexander von Humboldt Foundation (2005); ScienceGuide: 15 Most Inspiring Professors of the Netherlands (2013)
- Scientific career
- Fields: Chemistry, toxicology, nanotechnology
- Institutions: Saxion (Enschede) (1996–2015); NTNU (Trondheim) (2002–2005); Berkeley (2005); University of Iowa (2005–*); University of Hawaiʻi at Hilo (Hawaii) (2007); Jacobs University Bremen (2007–2008)
- Thesis: Monofluorinated PAHs: Standards for Environmental Analysis and Mechanistic Studies (2003)
- Doctoral advisor: Freek Ariese

Gregor Luthe (born 19 October 1970) is a German chemist, toxicologist, nanotechnologist, inventor and entrepreneur. He is known for his work on toxicology of PCBs and PBDEs.

== Early life ==
Luthe was born in Epe on 19 October 1970, the only child of bricklayer and stove fitter Ewald Luthe and spinning mill worker Käthe Luthe, née Böcker. Luthe had a hard start at school as he stammered until 9th grade, when he learned to manage this, and leaped forward, leaving the lower education Hauptschule to enter the Gymnasium in Bardel, finishing it 1989 as best in class.

At the age of 19, he traveled to visit the German Democratic Republic two weeks before the Fall of the Berlin Wall. Luthe was held for STASI questioning on 9 November 1989. He learned about this day's events only on the day of his release, the following morning.

== Career ==
Gregor Luthe studied chemistry, biology and physics at the University of Münster (1990 to 1995), where he specialized on fluorinated analogs of polycyclic aromatic hydrocarbon compounds and graduated with the diploma. In 2002 he obtained his doctorate at the Vrije Universiteit Amsterdam (Netherlands). Starting 1996 he worked as a lecturer at the Saxion University of Applied Sciences in Enschede (Netherlands). As Marie Curie fellow of the European Council Luthe went to Trondheim (Norway) 2002 to 2005, where he was a senior researcher at the Norwegian University of Science and Technology, and also worked as the technical director and associate of the company Chiron. 2005 he was awarded with the Feodor Lynen research scholarship of the Alexander von Humboldt Foundation to study toxicology in Berkeley at the University of Iowa (USA), where he still is visiting professor and supervises doctorate students of the interdisciplinary graduate program in human toxicology. Luthe started investigating in e.g. the toxicology of PCBs and PBDEs. After some months as a lecturer at the University of Hawaiʻi at Hilo he returned to Europe, to be a lecturer at the Saxion University of Applied Sciences in Enschede (Netherlands). 2007 to 2008 Luthe was additionally lecturer at the Jacobs University Bremen. In 2010 Gregor Luthe founded the company Windplussonne GmbH.

In February 2012 Gregor Luthe was appointed Professor of Nanotechnology (NanoBioInterface) at Saxion in Enschede, which was the first Nanotechnology lectureship in the Netherlands. The chair focuses on the development and application of NanoBio interface production techniques which are essential for medical, biological, toxicological and chemical applications, e. g. Lab-on-a-Chip devices. Luthe also engaged in multiple regional and international research partnerships and events, e.g. in January 2014 by establishing the Euregional Conference of Applied Nanotechnology (ECAN 2014) in Enschede, partnered by Alumni Nanotechnology Saxion (A.N.S), Saxion University of Applied Sciences, the MESA+ Institute for Nanotechnology (University of Twente) and CeNTech (University of Münster). In September 2014 Gregor Luthe was co-initiating the cooperation of the University of Twente and Saxion University of Applied Sciences, to promote joint research in the field of Nanotechnology and to start the Netherlands' first Master's degree program in nanotechnology. In 2014 Gregor Luthe founded the company Smart Material Printing with former students, to work on the production of new materials for 3D printing technologies as well as antibacterial surfaces. He also co-founded the company Nanobay – NB GmbH. Gregor Luthe left his chair in Nanotechnology at Saxion in February 2015 to focus on his company activities. Luthe continues to engage in research projects and scientific work.

== Awards and memberships ==
- 2002: Marie Curie Scholarship of the European Council
- 2005: Feodor Lynen Research Scholarship of the Alexander von Humboldt Foundation
- 2007: Foreign Countries Tutor of the Germany Society of Chemists (GDCh) for the Netherlands
- 2013: Chosen among the 15 most inspiring professors of the Netherlands by ScienceGuide
