= Michelle Ann Williams =

Jamaican-American epidemiologist

Michelle Williams
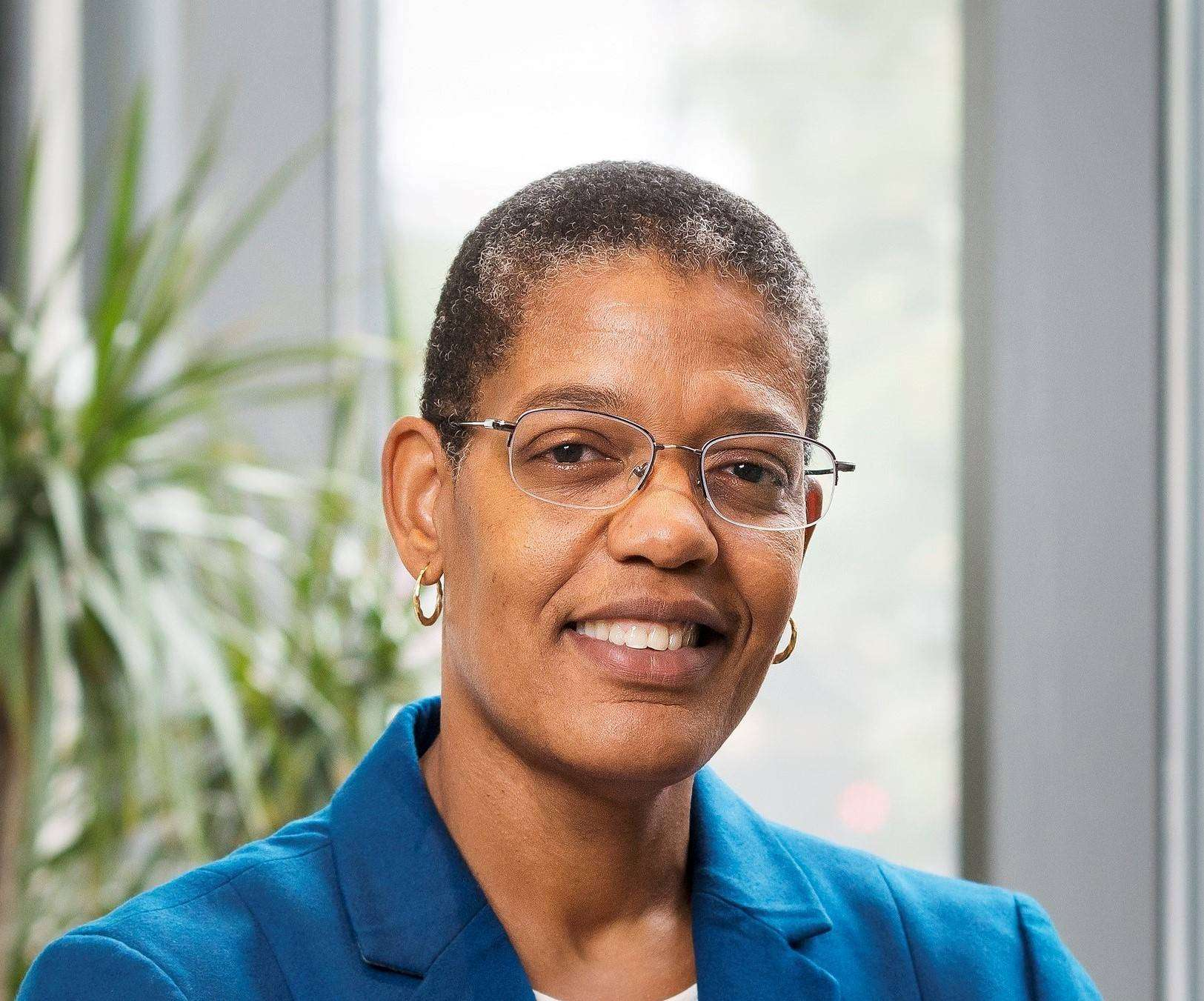

Dean of the Faculty, Harvard T. H. Chan School of Public Health
- In office July 1, 2016 – June 30, 2023
- Preceded by: Julio Frenk
- Succeeded by: Jane Kim (interim)

Personal details
- Born: Kingston, Jamaica
- Education: Princeton University (BA); Tufts University (MS); Harvard University (MS, ScD)
- Website: Official bio

Michelle Ann Williams is a Jamaican-American epidemiologist, public health scientist, and educator who has served as the dean of the Harvard T. H. Chan School of Public Health since 2016.

== Early life ==
Williams was born on January 1, 1962, and is the eldest of four children. When she was seven years old, her family immigrated to Queens, New York, where she attended New York City public schools.

While neither of her parents attended school past the elementary level, Williams attributes her academic success to a group of influential teachers who encouraged her to apply to top colleges and universities.

Williams became the first person in her family to attend college when she received her Bachelor of Arts in biology from Princeton University in 1984. She went on to earn a Master of Science in civil engineering two years later from Tufts University. She received two degrees from Harvard University, a Masters of Science with a concentration in demography and epidemiology in 1988, and a Doctor of Science degree in epidemiology in 1991.

== Career ==
After a postdoctoral research fellowship at the University of Washington School of Public Health, she joined the University of Washington faculty as an assistant professor of epidemiology in 1992. She went on to become an associate professor in 1996 and a professor in 2000.

Williams' scientific research focuses on reproductive health, pediatrics, and epidemiology. During her tenure in Washington, she was highly involved in the Center for Perinatal Studies, ultimately serving as co-director from 2000 to 2011. She simultaneously held appointments at the Fred Hutchinson Cancer Research Center and in global health at the University of Washington. Williams' scientific research focuses on reproductive health, pediatrics, and epidemiology. During her tenure in Washington, she was highly involved in the Center for Perinatal Studies, ultimately serving as co-director from 2000 to 2011. She simultaneously held appointments at the Fred Hutchinson Cancer Research Center and in global health at the University of Washington.

Williams returned to Harvard in 2011, becoming the first Stephen B. Kay Family Professor of Public Health and chair of the Department of Epidemiology. She also served as faculty director of the Harvard Catalyst Population Health Research Program and the Health Disparities Research Program.

Williams served as the Dean of the Faculty, Harvard T.H. Chan School of Public Health from June 2016 to December 2024 where she led the School of Public health during the COVID-19 pandemic. After leaving Harvard in 2024, she became a Professor of Epidemiology and Population Health and Associate Chair for Academic Affairs in the Department of Epidemiology and Population Health at Stanford University, School of Medicine.

== Leadership at Harvard T.H. Chan School of Public Health ==
In August 2015, Harvard T.H. Chan School of Public Health dean Julio Frenk left to become president of the University of Miami, and Williams was appointed as Frenk's successor as dean. When announcing her appointment, then-Harvard President Drew Faust called Williams a "skilled builder of bridges — between the theoretical and the practical, the domestic and the international." She was the first Black woman to lead a Harvard school.

As Harvard Chan dean, Williams has prioritized research and engagement with policy makers around pandemic response and preparedness, climate change, and systemic racism. She has also focused on supporting cross-disciplinary research, building global coalitions and empowering nursing leadership. In addition, she has worked to increase institutional support for junior faculty.

Williams has also recruited high-profile faculty to the school, including Dr. Kizzmekia Corbett, who helped lead the groundbreaking research that led to Moderna’s mRNA COVID-19 vaccine. Corbett joined the school as an Assistant Professor in the Department of Immunology and Infectious Diseases.

On campus, Williams has been “deeply attuned to the larger issue of school culture,” which among other initiatives, has meant a renewed commitment to campus diversity and inclusion. She hired Lilu Barbosa as the school’s first Chief Diversity, Inclusion, and Belonging Officer in June 2020 with a mandate to improve training, discussion, and support for diversity and inclusion across the campus.

Williams has been outspoken on issues of race and equity. She declared racism a public health crisis in 2020 and has written numerous op-eds explaining how structural racism contributes to health disparities and poor health outcomes for many communities of color in the U.S.

Another notable effort launched by Williams is the Apple Women’s Health Study, a collaboration between the Harvard Chan School, Apple, and the National Institute of Environmental Health Sciences. The research draws upon data from more than 10,000 volunteers who agree to track their menstrual cycles on their iPhone or Apple Watch and respond to regular surveys. The study has led to several publications, including a study showing that women were less likely to try to conceive during the first year of COVID pandemic.

Also under Williams' leadership, the school co-launched HealthLab, an accelerator for student-led ventures that seek to improve public and planetary health, as part of the school’s commitment to social impact.

Williams was appointed to a second five-year term as dean in 2021.

In November 2022, Williams announced she would step down as dean at the end of the 2022-23 academic year.

=== Global coalitions ===
In 2021, Williams announced a partnership between the Harvard T.H. Chan School of Public Health and a newly established school in Beijing, the Vanke School of Public Health at Tsinghua University. In addition to allowing Vanke students to take courses at Harvard, the program will allow professors and students from both universities to develop joint, cross-national research projects.

Williams, who also serves on the Vanke School’s international advisory board, believes “the solutions for the biggest threats to global population health today won't come from any one institution or one continent.” In addition, Williams, along with former director-general of the World Health Organization Margaret Chan, founded a Global Coalition of Deans of Schools of Public Health to work on issues of global health security.

Under Williams’ leadership, the school has also been involved in the Partnership for Central America, a public-private-academic partnership mobilizing investment to improve the quality of life for residents of El Salvador, Guatemala, and Honduras, with a goal of curbing irregular migration to the U.S.

=== Global Nursing Leadership Program ===
In April 2021, Williams oversaw the launch of the Harvard Global Nursing Leadership program, a partnership between three Harvard graduate schools — Harvard Chan School, Harvard Kennedy School, and Harvard Graduate School of Education — and the Africa Centres for Disease Control and Prevention and the African Union to identify and train executive-level nurses and midwives to “improve population health and generate key regulatory reforms.”

In summer 2022, the program enrolled its first African cohort, with plans to expand to Asia, Latin America, the Caribbean, and North America in the following years.

=== COVID response ===
During the COVID pandemic, Williams co-founded the COVID Collaborative, a diverse team of experts in health, education, and the economy. They issued numerous high-profile recommendations on the public health response to the pandemic and drafted policy briefs on topics including supporting children orphaned by COVID and improving virtual education.

Williams was highly active in advocating for the U.S. to lead the charge in vaccinating the world, including by transferring technology to developing nations in the Global South to enable them to produce vaccines.

She also raised an early, urgent alarm about the public health impact of Long COVID in an article she co-wrote in the New England Journal of Medicine with Dr. Steven Phillips in August 2021.

Also during the pandemic, Williams joined Arianna Huffington, founder of Thrive Global, and Natalie Tran, the Executive Director of the CAA Foundation, in founding #FirstRespondersFirst, a collaboration to provide frontline healthcare workers with support and advocate for increased attention to employee mental health and well-being.

In a June 2020 interview with The Washington Post, Williams argued that it was “incumbent on us to help frontline health workers recognize the very fundamental aspects of what it's going to take for them to be able to build the resilience to continue to do the thing that they have trained all their lives to do, and that is, care for others.”

== Harvard Crimson controversy ==
In December 2019, Harvard faculty members at the Harvard T.H. Chan School of Public Health met without Williams to consider a "no confidence" vote on her leadership as the School's dean, citing concerns revealed in the annual Faculty Priority Survey related to insufficient faculty governance and poor communication by Williams that played a role in the departure of 14 faculty from the school over two years.

In January 2020, The Harvard Crimson reported that allegations included that "Williams has punished faculty and staff in the past for expressing dissent, creating what multiple affiliates termed a 'culture of retaliation.'" The school’s administrative dean, Michael J. Grusby, was also cited as "demeaning and disrespectful."

The faculty ultimately decided not to vote against Williams, expressing "reservations about the optics of censuring Harvard's first black dean of a professional school and the school's first female dean."

In a town hall and an email to the school community, Williams directly addressed the concerns raised by faculty, writing that she took them “extremely seriously.” She added: “Equity, justice, and inclusion are core tenets of public health—and the values that guide us as a school. As Dean, I am personally committed to upholding these values and ensuring that the Harvard Chan School is a safe and welcoming community—as well as one that reflects the communities we aim to serve.”

In February 2020, Grusby stepped down from his administrative positions at the School.

In 2021, Williams was appointed to a second five-year term as dean, in a strong show of support and confidence from university administrators.

== Research ==
Williams’ scientific research primarily focuses on reproductive health, pediatrics, and molecular epidemiology. Williams has published more than 510 scientific papers covering these topics, including deep dives into common complications from pregnancy to investigations into the impact of epidemiological data like sleep, exercise, and other biomarkers. In addition, she has led several successful, large-scale clinical epidemiological studies — including ones designed to understand environmental causes of adverse pregnancy outcomes — over the years.

While at the University of Washington, Williams established the Multidisciplinary International Research Training program (MIRT), which offered undergraduate and graduate students who are members of underrepresented minority groups and studying subjects like global health, biostatistics, and epidemiology an opportunity to conduct research at one of the program’s research sites across South America, Southeast Asia, Africa, and Europe. There, students would be guided and mentored by host researchers, developing their analytical skills and improving their research and writing along the way. Williams told the University of Washington News she created the program to “allow minority students to have an international experience, something I didn't have until I was a graduate student.”

== Honors and recognition ==
In 2011, while Williams was at the University of Washington, President Obama recognized her with the prestigious Presidential Award for Excellence in Science, Mathematics, and Engineering Mentoring for her work in developing the MIRT Program.

Williams has also been recognized for excellence in teaching. In 2007, the University of Washington honored her and the MIRT program with the Brotman Award for Instructional Excellence, and that same year she was recognized by the American Public Health Association for excellence in epidemiology education. In 2015, she was awarded the Harvard Chan School’s Outstanding Mentor Award.

In February 2017, Williams received the Trailblazer Award from the U.S. Attorney’s Office for the Eastern District of New York. In 2020, she was recognized by PR Week as one of the top 50 health influencers of the year.

In February 2021, amid the ongoing COVID-19 pandemic, Williams was awarded the Clear Voice Award, which recognizes “a leading figure and persuasive voice in the efforts to ensure COVID-19 vaccines are distributed equitably and that issues of vaccine hesitancy are adequately resolved." In particular, she was recognized for her work to ensure that communities of color remained a priority during the United States’ response to the pandemic. In accepting the award, Williams herself said, “I don’t see myself as a powerful communicator. But I felt that I had to rise to this occasion, because this pandemic has challenged us in so many ways.”

In 2022 Williams was awarded the Ellis Island Medal of Honor, which are awarded each year to “inspiring Americans who are selflessly working for the betterment of our country and its citizens.”

Williams also serves on various boards including Americares, McLean Hospital, and ICF.

== Notable media appearances ==
=== Interviews ===
- CBS Sunday Morning. How public health works—and why it sometimes doesn’t. July 24, 2022.
- NPR. President Biden’s pandemic response plan: One year in. January 18, 2022.
- Bloomberg. Balance of Power: Reform for Resilience. June 10, 2021.
- Bloomberg. Quicktake: Black in Focus. April 29, 2021
- Washington Post. Live Interview with Arianna Huffington and Natalie Tran. June 26, 2020.

=== Podcast appearances and other talks ===
- New York Times’s Sway. A Public Health Lesson for Ron DeSantis. April 6, 2021.
- Nursing Economic$ Podcast Series Podcast. Nursing and Nursing Leadership in Global Public Health. January 12, 2021
- Salt Talks. Public Health is “Undervalued & Underinvested.” October 29, 2020.
- Carmelo Anthony. Flattening the COVID-19 Curve in the Black Community. May 26, 2020.

=== Op-eds ===
- Boston Globe. The Supreme Court is misinformed on eugenics. June 23, 2022
- Emancipator. The right to an abortion can be saved. May 5, 2022.
- STAT News. Building scientific talent in the Global South can help prevent future public health crises. May 8, 2022.
- Fortune. ESG is not enough. It’s time to add an H. March 14, 2022
- The Washington Post. Biden has failed to defeat COVID-19 as promised. Here’s how he must shift his strategy. Jan. 24, 2022.
- The Hill. Women lost decades of progress after COVID — Roe's repeal would erase more. December 12, 2021.
- Devex. For a healthier world, empower nurses. December 2021.
- The Hill. To support physicians' mental health, we need a systemic overhaul. September 19, 2021.
- Boston Globe. Life expectancy depends on where you call home. September 6, 2021.
- The Hill. 2021 climate disasters foreshadow future challenges for public health. September 5, 2021.
- Boston Globe. Juneteenth can jumpstart recognition of America's racial health disparities. June 25, 2021.
- STAT News. Public health is being undermined. These 10 actions can restore it. February 5, 2021.
- Washington Post. Racism is killing black people. It’s sickening them, too. June 4, 2020.
