= Bernd Düker =

German footballer

Personal information
- Date of birth: 1 April 1992 (age 34)
- Place of birth: Gronau, North Rhine-Westphalia, Germany
- Height: 1.91 m (6 ft 3 in)
- Position: Goalkeeper

Team information
- Current team: SC Spelle-Venhaus
- Number: 23

Youth career
- 1997–2005: FC Schwarz Weiß Weiner
- 2005–2008: FC Vorwärts Wettringen
- 2008–2010: VfL Osnabrück
- 2010–2011: Werder Bremen

Senior career*
Years	Team	Apps	(Gls)
2011–2013	Werder Bremen III	16	(0)
2011–2013	Werder Bremen II	8	(0)
2013–2017	VfL Osnabrück II	88	(0)
2017–2018	BV Essen		
2018–	SC Spelle-Venhaus	49	(0)
- * Club domestic league appearances and goals as of 1 July 2021

Bernd Düker (born 1 April 1992) is a German footballer who plays as a goalkeeper for German lower league side SC Spelle-Venhaus.
