= Larry Robertson (toxicologist) =

Larry W. Robertson
- Citizenship: United States
- Education: Stetson University, Chemistry (B.A., 1969); University of Florida, Microbiology (M.S., 1971); University of Michigan, Public Health (M.P.H., 1972); University of Michigan, Environmental Health Sciences (Ph.D., 1981); Texas A&M University, Toxicology Prof. S. Safe (Postdoc, 1981-'82); University of Mainz, Toxicology Prof. Franz Oesch (Humbold Fellow, Postdoc & Project Leader, 1983-'86)
- Known for: Toxicology of POPs and PCBs
- Awards: Research Fellowship of the Alexander von Humboldt Foundation (1983-1986); John Doull award of the Society of Toxicology (2007)
- Scientific career
- Fields: Chemistry, Microbiology, Toxicology
- Workplaces: University of Guelph, Dept. of Chemistry Research Assistant, (1978-1981); Texas A&M University, Department of Veterinary Physiology & Pharmacology (Postdoc, 1981-'82); University of Kentucky, Graduate Center for Toxicology Associate Professor and Professor, (1986-2003); University of Iowa, Department of Occupational & Environmental Health Professor (2003-*)
- Thesis: (1981)

Larry W. Robertson is an American chemist, microbiologist and toxicologist. He is professor at the University of Iowa, Department of Occupational and Environmental Health, known for his work on toxicology of POPs and PCBs, which are important environmental pollutants.

== Scientific work ==
Robertson's scientific research focuses on the mechanisms of toxicity of polyhalogenated aromatic hydrocarbons, e.g. polychlorinated biphenyls (PCBs), dibenzodioxins (PCDDs), dibenzofurans (PCDFs) and various pesticides. His work is including studies of their effects on gene regulation, their metabolism to electrophilic species and their binding to nucleophiles (including amino acids, nucleotides and DNA). Recent work comprises the metabolism of halogenated compounds to show oxidative events, which lead to increased oxidative DNA damage - in important factor in the cancerogenic potential of a compound.

== Career (selected) ==
A professor at The University of Kentucky, Robertson was program director of the Superfund Basic Research Program.

Robertson received international recognition for hosting the First PCB Workshop (Recent Advances in the Environmental Toxicology and Health Effects of PCBs), held at Lexington, KY, April 9–12, 2000. A resulting publication was edited with Larry G. Hansen and accepted as reference work. He also engaged in organization and funding for international follow-up workshops (biannually).

Robertson was appointed professor of toxicology at The University of Iowa College of Public Health in 2003. Right now he is the Principal Investigator of the Iowa Superfund Basic Research Program (ISBRP) and the Pilot Grant Program Director in the university's Environmental Health Sciences Research Center. His research work is funded by NIOSH, EPA and NIH.

== Present positions ==
- (2003 - *) - Professor of Toxicology at The University of Iowa College of Public Health Department of Occupational and Environmental Health
- (2003 - *) - Director of the Pilot Grant Program, and (Co-) Director of the Oxidative Stress and Metabolism Research Cluster of the Environmental Health Sciences Research Center (EHSRC)
- (2006 - *) - Principal Investigator / Program Director of the Iowa Superfund (Basic) Research Program (ISRP)
- (2007 - *) - Director of UOI's Interdisciplinary Graduate Program in Human Toxicology
- Member of the Environmental Health Science Research Center (EHSRC), a National Institute of Environmental Health Sciences Center of Excellence
- Full Member of the Holden Comprehensive Cancer Center, Cancer Epidemiology and Population Science (CEPS)

== Past positions (selected) ==
- Program Director of the Superfund Basic Research Program (The University of Kentucky)

== Selected honors, memberships and awards ==
- (1983 - 1986) - Research Fellowship of the Alexander von Humboldt Foundation and Project Leader (in SFB 302 “Early Stages in Carcinogenesis”) at the University of Mainz
- 2007 - John Doull awardee of the Central States regional chapter of the Society of Toxicology
- Past President of the Ohio Valley regional chapter of the Society of Toxicology
- Past President of the UK Chapter of Sigma Xi, The Scientific Research Society
- Fellow of the Academy of Toxicological Sciences (ATS)
