= Toxicological Sciences =

- Discipline: Toxicology
- Language: English
- Edited by: Jeffrey M. Peters

Publication details
- History: 1981–present
- Publisher: Oxford University Press on behalf of the Society of Toxicology
- Frequency: Monthly
- Open access: Hybrid and delayed, after 12 months
- Impact factor: 3.703 (2019)

Standard abbreviations
- ISO 4: Toxicol. Sci.

Indexing
- CODEN: TOSCF2
- ISSN: 1096-6080 (print); 1094-2025 (web)
- LCCN: 98660653
- OCLC no.: 37825607

Links
- Journal homepage; Online access; Online archive

Toxicological Sciences is a monthly peer-reviewed scientific journal which covers all aspects of research on toxicology. It is published by Oxford University Press on behalf of the Society of Toxicology. It was established in 1981 as Fundamental and Applied Toxicology and obtained its current name in 1998. The current editor-in-chief is Jeffrey M. Peters, a professor of molecular toxicology and carcinogenesis at The Pennsylvania State University, and the Managing Editor is Virginia F. Hawkins. The editorial staff also includes Associate Editors in subject areas and an editorial board of topic experts. While its ISO 4 abbreviation is Toxicol. Sci. it is commonly referred to as ToxSci.

== Abstracting and indexing ==
The journal is abstracted and indexed in Biological Abstracts, BIOSIS, CAB International, Chemical Abstracts Service, Current Contents, EMBASE, Health & Safety Science Abstracts, Science Citation Index, and Toxicology Abstracts.

According to the Journal Citation Reports, the journal has a 2016 impact factor of 4.081, ranking it 11th out of 92 journals in the category "Toxicology".
