= Gronau, North Rhine-Westphalia =

Gronau
- Town
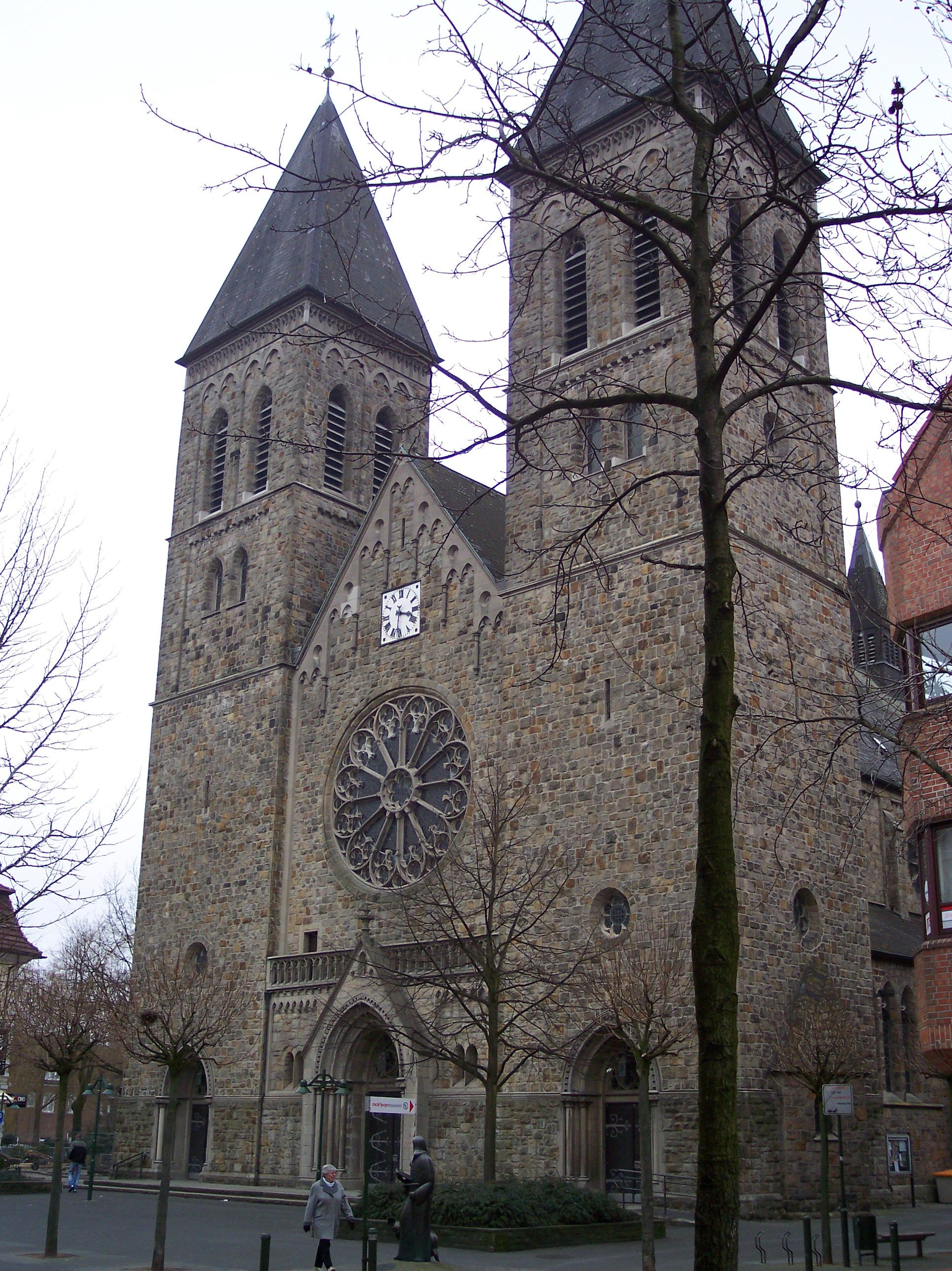
- Saint Anthony Church

- Flag Coat of arms
- Interactive map of Gronau
- Location within Germany Location within North Rhine-Westphalia
- Coordinates: 52°12′45″N 7°02′30″E
- Country: Germany
- State: North Rhine-Westphalia
- Admin. region: Münster
- District: Borken
- First mentioned: 1365
- Subdivisions: 2

Government
  - Mayor (2019–25): Rainer Doetkotte (CDU)

Area
  - Total: 78.82 km^{2} (30.43 sq mi)
- Elevation: 27 m (89 ft)

Population (2025-12-31)
  - Total: 50,349
  - Density: 638.8/km^{2} (1,654/sq mi)
- Time zone: UTC+01:00 (CET)
  - Summer (DST): UTC+02:00 (CEST)
- Postal codes: 48599
- Dialling codes: +49 (0)2562 +49 (0)2565 (Epe)
- Vehicle registration: BOR, AH, BOH
- Website: www.gronau.de

Gronau (German pronunciation: [ˈɡʁoːnaʊ]; officially Gronau (Westf.), is a town in the district of Borken in North Rhine-Westphalia, Germany, near the border with the Netherlands, 10 km east of Enschede. The city is divided into the districts of Gronau and Epe.

== Geography ==
Gronau lies in the lowlands surrounding the Dinkel, which flows from the south to the north of the town. The Gildehauser Venn lies to the northeast.

== History ==
Documentary evidence of Gronau dates to 1365, and of district Epe to 1188.

Industrialisation took hold in Gronau with the founding of the first textile factory in 1854. Dutch investors, in particular, drove the growing textile industry. In 1875, railway lines were opened from Gronau to Münster, Dortmund, and Enschede.

With the growth of the textile industry and the founding of the Gronauer Bauverein (homebuilding) in the eastern part of the city (1893), an expansion of the settlement area began. By the time of World War I, a new town hall, the district court, the parish church of St. Antonius, schools, hospitals, an indoor swimming pool, waterworks, an electricity plant, and the city park had been built in Gronau.

On 27 December 1897, Gronau was granted town rights. In 1910, the skeleton of a Cretaceous plesiosaur was discovered and is now housed in the Geological-Paleontological Museum of Münster.

On the night of 9 to 10 November 1938, also known as "Reichspogromnacht", the synagogue in Wallstraße was desecrated in connection with the persecution of the Jewish population. Eventually, most Jews from Gronau and Epe were deported to the extermination camps. There is still a Jewish cemetery in Gronau today. In the Epe district, the former Jewish synagogue is currently being rebuilt as a cultural centre.

In 1975, Gronau and the municipality of Epe were merged into the new municipality of Gronau.

The bankruptcy of the van Delden Group, founded in 1854, in 1980-1981 marked the end of the era of the textile industry in Gronau.

== Population ==
Historical population

Year	Pop.	±% p.a.
1965	37,625	—
1970	38,681	+0.56%
1975	40,535	+0.94%
1980	41,210	+0.33%
1985	39,768	−0.71%
1990	40,687	+0.46%
1995	43,529	+1.36%

Year	Pop.	±% p.a.
2000	44,860	+0.60%
2005	46,373	+0.67%
2010	46,553	+0.08%
2015	47,010	+0.20%
2020	48,576	+0.66%
2025	50,349	+0.72%

Source: Landesdatabank Nordrhein-Westfalen

== Culture ==
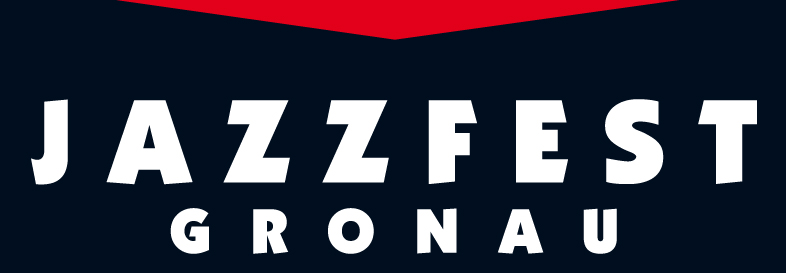
JazzFest Gronau logo

Since 1989 an annual music festival, the Jazzfest Gronau, takes place in Gronau. A broad range of national and international musicians have performed at the festival, including Jan Garbarek, McCoy Tyner, Klaus Doldinger’s Passport, Blood, Sweat & Tears, Al Di Meola, Avishai Cohen, Al Jarreau, Ian Anderson, Richard Galliano, Ron Carter, Mother's Finest, Gregory Porter, Maceo Parker, Stefanie Heinzmann.

The Jazzfest is currently funded to a large extent by local and regional sponsors and enjoys a constantly growing audience. The annual number of visitors swings between 12,000 and 18,000 visitors (incl. open-air events). The share of foreign visitors is around 65%.

== Transport ==
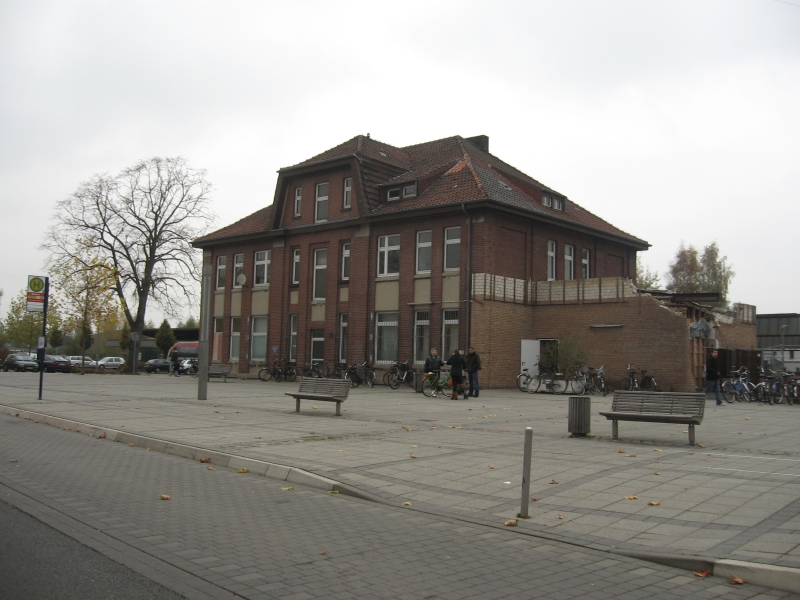
Gronau (Westf) train station

Gronau can be reached by road via the Autobahn A 30 and A 31, the Dutch Rijksweg 35, the Bundesstraße B 54n. Gronau (Westf) railway station connects Gronau with Enschede in the Netherlands via the Dortmund–Gronau railway and the Münster–Enschede railway. Gronau is located in the area of the fare association Westfalen-Tarif. The nearest airports are Münster Osnabrück Airport and Enschede Airport Twente, although the latter has no scheduled flights.

The town is connected to the regional Flamingo cycle path.

== Politics ==
=== Mayors ===
The following is a list of the mayors of Gronau since 1974:

- 1974–1979: Bruno Jäkel (SDP)
- 1979–1984: Gerhard Schultewolter (CDU)
- 1984–1989: Bruno Jäkel (SDP)
- 1989–1994: Norbert Diekmann (SDP)
- 1994–1999: Gerhard Gleis-Preister (CDU)
- 1999–2013: Karl-Heinz Holtwisch (CDU)
- 2013–2019: Sonja Jürgens (SPD)
- 2019–2025: Rainer Doetkotte (CDU)
- Since 2025: Jörg von Borczyskowski

=== Town insignia ===
The current coat of arms of Gronau features a green shield with a broad yellow stripe running down the middle. In the middle of the stripe is a duck colored in blue. On the left hand side of the design is a yellow coil, while on the right is a yellow stalk of corn. The most recent design before the one adopted in 1981 featured a similar design, with a different direction for the stripe and the duck colored in red.

Coat of arms

Banner

Flag

Coat of arms 1898 to 1937

Coat of arms 1937 to 1981

Coat of arms of the former municipality of Epe

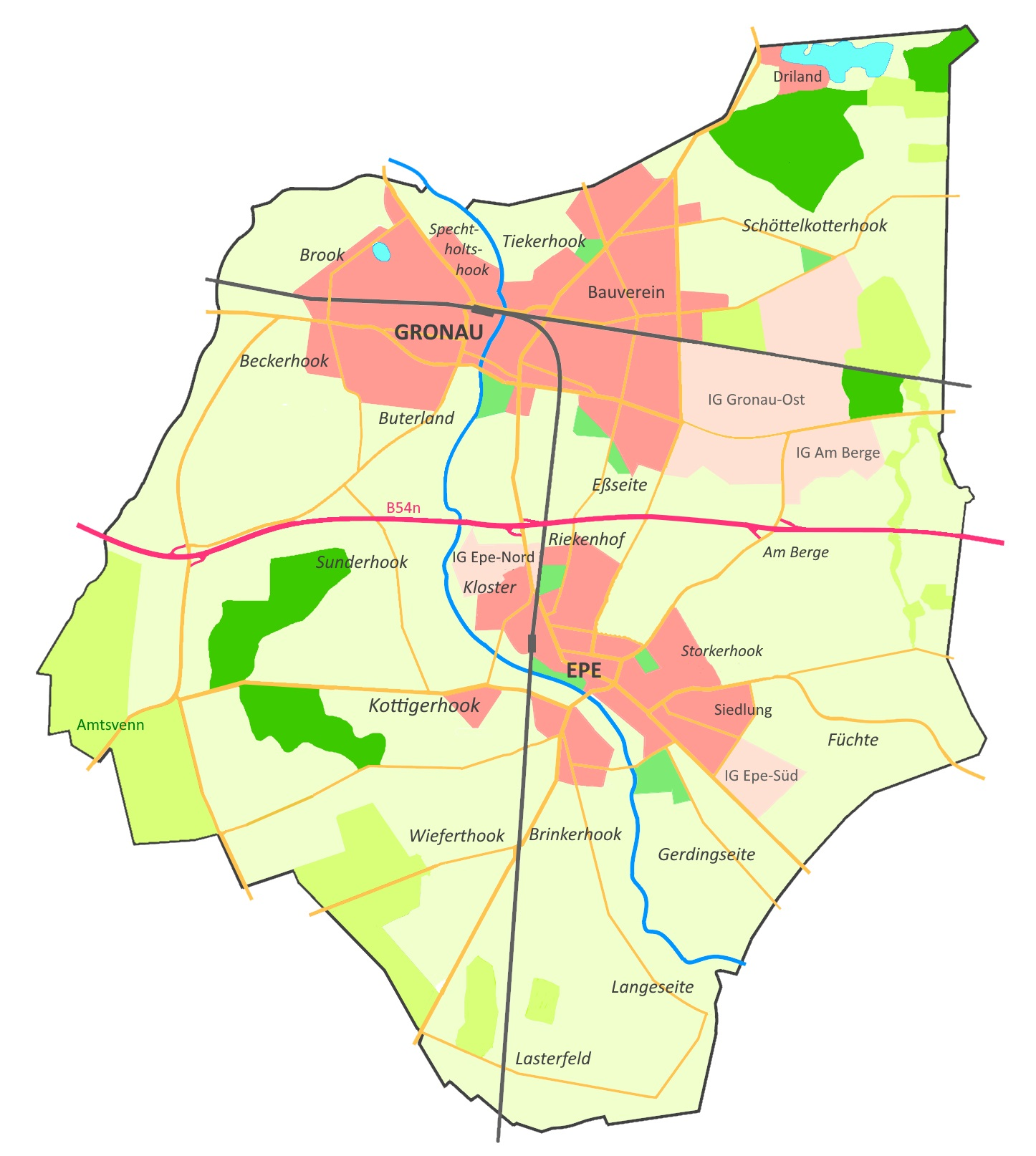
Overview map

== Notable people ==
The Dutch singer Rania Zeriri lives in Gronau. The Polish tennis player Agnieszka Radwańska grew up here; her father was a tennis coach at the local club. Blaise Nkufo, a Swiss footballer with African roots, former player of the Dutch football club FC Twente, lived in Gronau. Klaus Vogelgesang, a German artist, grew up in Gronau.

=== Born in Gronau ===
- Winfried Berkemeier (born 1953), footballer
- Bernd Düker (born 1992), footballer
- Rolf Eckrodt (born 1942), CEO of Mitsubishi Motors from 2001 until 2005
- Tim Hölscher (born 1995), footballer
- Cengiz Koç (born 1977), former German heavyweight boxer of Turkish descent
- Erich Lindenberg (1938–2006), painter, elder brother of Udo Lindenberg
- Udo Lindenberg (born 1946), singer and musician
- Gregor Luthe (born 1970 in Epe), chemist, toxicologist, nanotechnologist, inventor and entrepreneur
- Jens Wissing (born 1988), football player

== Places of interest ==
- City Park and Zoo – built before World War I
- Lake Driland, artificially created in the 1970s
- Rock'n'Pop Museum

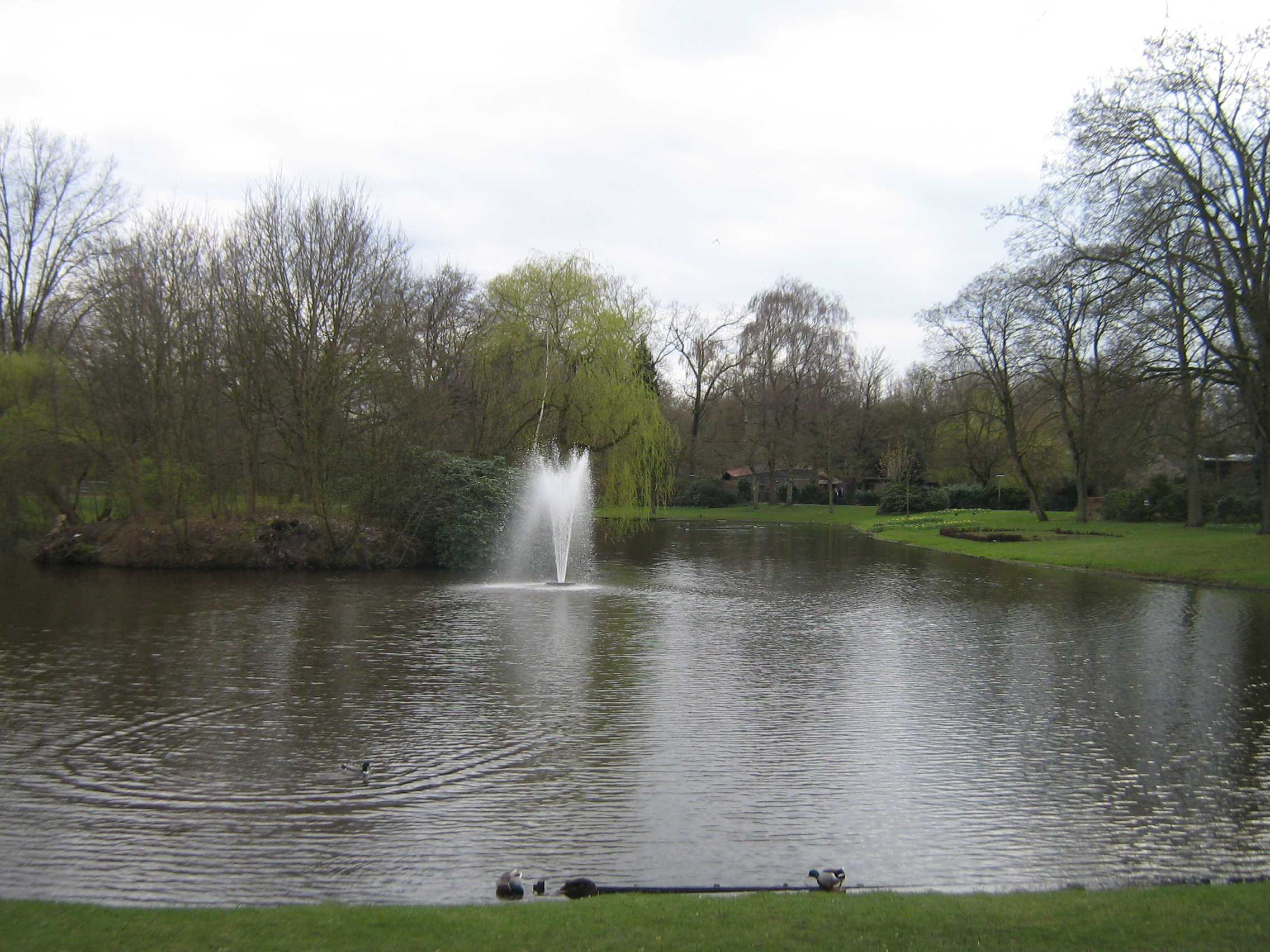
City Park in Gronau

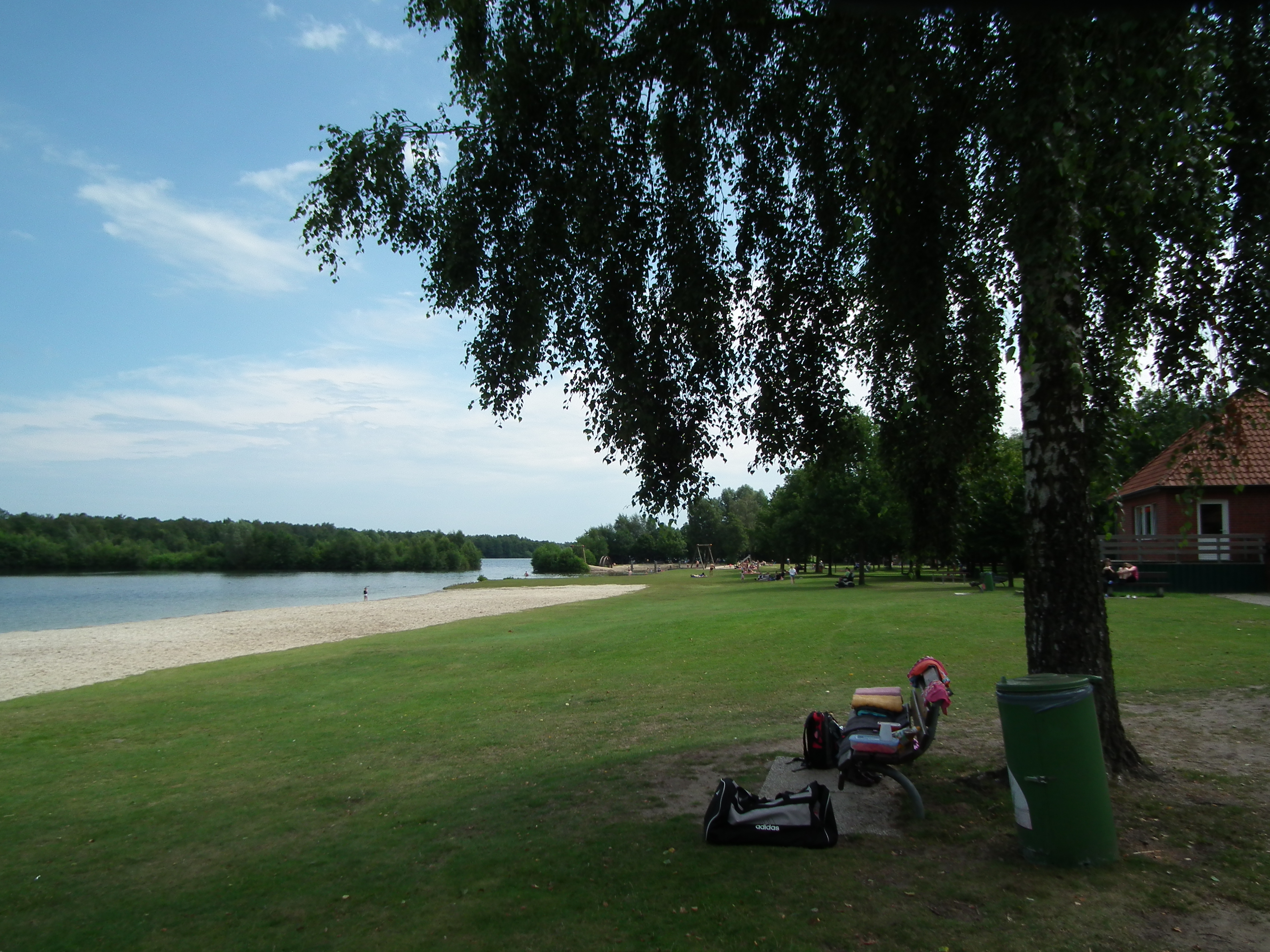
Lake Driland

== Twin towns – sister cities ==
Gronau is twinned with:

- Epe, Netherlands
- Bromsgrove, United Kingdom
- Mezőberény, Hungary
