= Epe, Westphalia =

Epe
- Stadtteil of Gronau
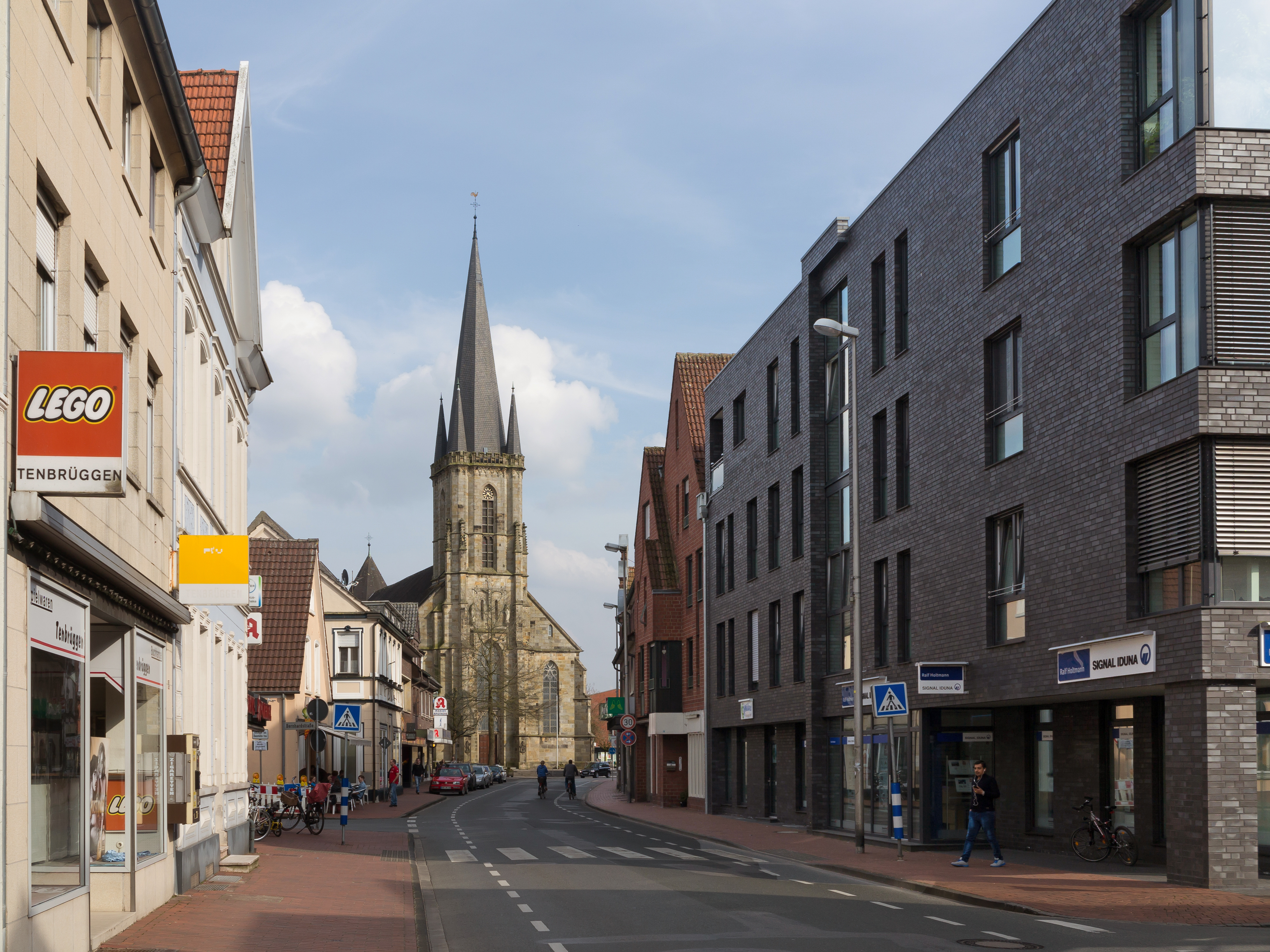
- View to Gronauer-Str. and catholic church: Sankt Agatha

- Coat of arms
- Interactive map of Epe
- Location within Germany Location within North Rhine-Westphalia
- Coordinates: 52°11′N 7°02′E
- Country: Germany
- State: North Rhine-Westphalia
- Admin. region: Münster
- District: Borken
- Town: Gronau

Area
  - Total: 47.77 km^{2} (18.44 sq mi)
- Elevation: 36–54 m (118–177 ft)

Population (2022-12-31)
  - Total: 15,589
  - Density: 326.3/km^{2} (845.2/sq mi)
- Time zone: UTC+01:00 (CET)
  - Summer (DST): UTC+02:00 (CEST)
- Postal codes: 48599
- Dialling codes: 02565
- Vehicle registration: AH, BOH, BOR
- Website: epe.de

Epe is a village in the district of Borken in the state of North Rhine-Westphalia, Germany. It is located on the Dutch border, approx. 10 km east of Enschede. It has been part of the municipality of Gronau since 1975. Epe has a population of about 16,000 and is located on the Dinkel River.

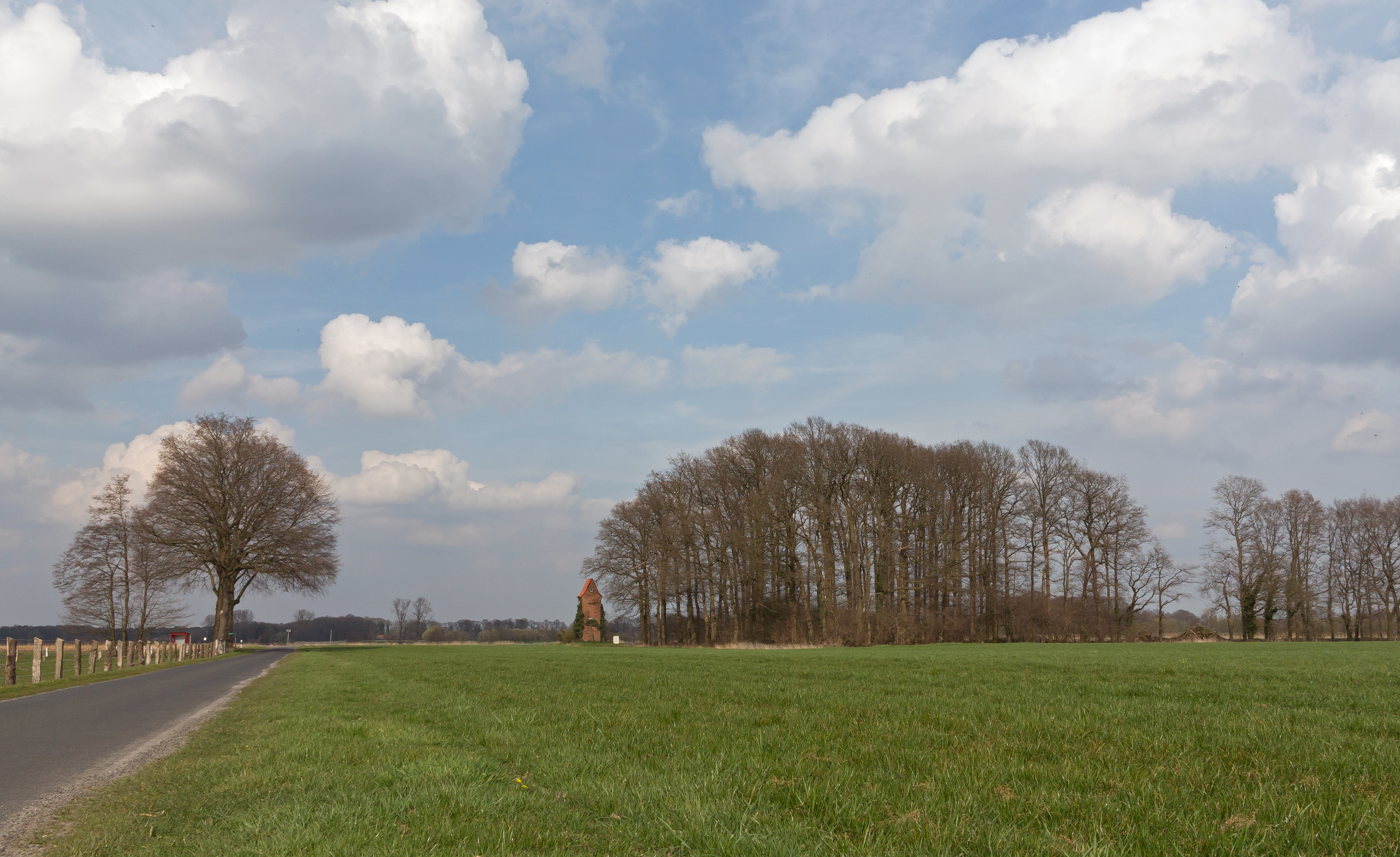
Brinkerhook, landscape

== Local history ==
Already in the time between 2000 and 1700 B.C. a settlement of the Eper area can be proven. Findings of weapons, jewellery and pottery bear witness to this Neolithic settlement. The finds can be found in the museum in Münster.

The church, built around 1175, was probably a stone building. The baptismal font from this period, which is still preserved today, indicates this. The church seems to have stood on the floor of the Epe courtyard and was therefore a church of its own.

In 1188 the village Epe was mentioned for the first time in the list of goods of Count Dale zu Diepenheim (today in the Rijksarchief Utrecht). The count owned one third of the church patronage. The name Epe is derived from the Ur-Germanic Apa ("place at the river/water").

In 1325 the manor house 'Droste Wüllen Epe' was first mentioned in a document. It was in the possession of the lords of Keppel zu Nienborg, who had the patronage right over the parish for a long time. Heinrich von Wüllen was enfeoffed with the court of Epe in 1380. Thus the house became Wüllen. It was located near to the Dinkel (today Schepers Mühle).

In 1400 the first mention of farm communities in the districts Lange Seite and the Gerdingseite took place. Ten years later Herr von Plettenberg expanded and embellished Epe. During the Eighty Years' War fires broke out in 1583, 1588 and 1593.

1803 Epe fell according to the Reichsdeputationshauptschluss to the county Salm-Horstmar. In 1806 Epe came to the Grand Duchy of Berg under Napoleon I's brother-in-law Murat and in 1811 fell to the Empire of France. As a result of the wars of liberation and the resolutions at the Congress of Vienna, Epe became Prussian in 1815. In 1882 a fire destroyed most of the town. In 1886 the former church Saint Agatha collapsed. In this emergency no persons were injured.

In 1875 the railway line from Gronau via Epe to Dortmund was opened. 1881 saw the foundation of the first textile factory, the weaving mill of Gebr. Laurenz from Ochtrup, with 500 mechanical looms. A spinning mill was put into operation in 1904/1905. This was followed by a dyeing plant. The factory was closed in 1967.

The ‘Germania Epe’ cotton spinning mill was founded in 1897 by the Jannink family from Enschede NL. Plant II was put into operation in 1910. Up to 700 workers were employed. After the First World War, Germania issued a 25 pfennig small change replacement stamp as emergency money. The plant was closed in 1992. On the night of 28 February 2009, a fire broke out in the Germania II factory building, completely destroying the building.

The flourishing of the textile industry led to an increase in the population at the turn of the century. Several Catholic schools were built.

In 1904 the Eper gas plant was built. In 1905 the bailiff Pilatus had a central water supply network built. In 1907 the village received a Protestant school and in 1911 a Protestant church. The Eper Park was also established in 1926.

On 1 April 1934, the village of Epe and the parish of Epe were united to form the new municipality Epe.

== Jewish community ==
In the night from 9 to 10 November 1938, also called Reichskristallnacht or Reichspogromnacht, the synagogue Wilhelmstraße was desecrated and set on fire. Finally all Jews from Epe (the families Pagener, Eichenwald, Lebenstein, de Witte, Rothschild, Andriesse) were deported to the extermination camps.

The Jewish cemetery was built in the district ‘Eilermark’ in 1828 and used until 1936 for the burial of the Jewish deceased from the communities of Gronau, Epe and Nienborg. There are still 54 grave monuments on the cemetery today, the cemetery is maintained by the town municipality. In 1828 the area belonged to Parish Epe, today to commune Gronau.

In 2008 and 2009, memorial stumbling blocks were laid in Oststraße and Merschstraße to commemorate the Jews who once lived and were deported there. The "Förderkreis Alte Synagoge Epe e. V.", founded in 2017, has set itself the goal of transforming the empty synagogue building into a place of remembrance and learning. Since 2018, the building has been listed as a historical monument. It is planned to make the building usable as e.g. memorial museum in 2020.

== Economy ==
The local Salzgewinnungsgesellschaft Westfalen (SGW), a joint venture between Solvay, Vestolit and Bayer, is a mining company that extracts salt (solution mining). It extracts more than two million tons of salt each year, from the Lower Rhine salt pan (Solution mining). The brine is sent via pipeline to locations of the chemical industry in the Ruhr area (Vestolit/Chemiepark Marl), on the Lower Rhine (Solvay at Rheinberg) and to Belgium (Solvay at Jemeppe-sur-Sambre).

The empty salt storages are used to store natural gas. The salt caverns of Epe are located southwest of the village in the Kottigerhook and in the Amtsvenn area. The Natural gas is stored underground at a depth of 900 to 1500 m. The working gas volume of the caverns is over 2.5 m³. This makes the facility, with around 75 caverns, the largest of its kind in Europe.

The largest operators are Uniper (formerly E.ON Ruhrgas) and Innogy (formerly RWE). Other companies that store gas are Trianel (since 2008), Nuon (Vattenfall NL, since 2007), KGE and Eneco (since 2011).

The stored natural gas comes from the Netherlands, the North Sea and Russia, the supply area extends from Hamburg to Frankfurt and the Netherlands.

== Town twinning ==
Epe is twinned with the town of Epe in the Netherlands.
