= Rajeshwari Sundaram =

Indian biostatistician

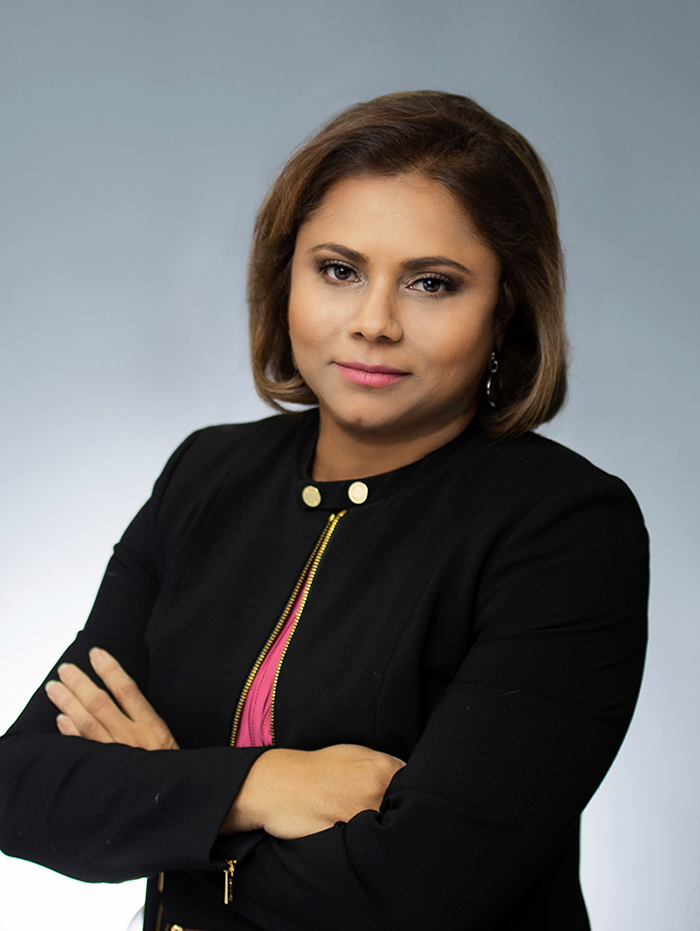
- Sundaram in 2020
- Education: University of Calcutta; Indian Statistical Institute; Michigan State University
- Scientific career
- Fields: Survival analysis, reproductive health
- Workplaces: University of North Carolina at Charlotte; Eunice Kennedy Shriver National Institute of Child Health and Human Development

Rajeshwari Sundaram is an Indian biostatistician specializing in survival analysis and reproductive health who works at the National Institutes of Health as a senior investigator in the Eunice Kennedy Shriver National Institute of Child Health and Human Development. Topics in her research have included the effects of obesity on fertility, infant and early childhood screen time, and the long-term persistence of postpartum depression.

== Education and career ==
Sundaram is a graduate of the University of Calcutta, and has a master's degree from the Indian Statistical Institute and a Ph.D. in statistics from Michigan State University. Her 1999 dissertation, Estimation in the Two-Sample Doubly Censored and Randomly Truncated Scale Models, was supervised by Hira Koul.

She became an assistant professor at the University of North Carolina at Charlotte before moving to the National Institutes of Health in 2006, taking her present position in the Shriver Institute in 2014.

She is the 2021 chair of the Risk Analysis Section of the American Statistical Association.

== Recognition ==
Sundaram was the 2020 winner of the Jeanne E. Griffith Mentoring Award of the Interagency Council on Statistical Policy, for her work with trainees at the National Institutes of Health. She was also elected as a Fellow of the American Statistical Association in 2020, and is an elected member of the International Statistical Institute.
