= John Doull (toxicologist) =

American physician (1922–2017)

- Born: September 13, 1922; Baker, Montana, U.S.
- Died: March 24, 2017 (aged 94)
- Education: Montana State University (BS); University of Chicago (PhD, MD)
- Scientific career
- Fields: Toxicology

John Doull (September 13, 1922 – March 24, 2017) was Professor of Pharmacology and Toxicology at the University of Kansas.

== Education ==
Doull was a native of Baker, Montana. He received a B.Sc. degree in chemistry from Montana State University in 1944, and after three years of service in the US Navy, he attended the University of Chicago and graduated with a PhD degree in pharmacology (1950) and an MD degree (1953). During his time at the University of Chicago he developed his keen interest in toxicology.

== Career ==
Doull served as assistant professor and associate professor at the University of Chicago, and was then recruited in 1967 to the Department of Pharmacology, Toxicology, and Therapeutics, Kansas University Medical Center (KUMC) to build a strong toxicology program. In addition to his teaching and research at KUMC, Doull was very active in the Society of Toxicology (SOT) and contributed to the success of the society and the establishment of toxicology as an independent discipline. He served the society in many capacities including as 26th president in 1986/87.

Doull was the founding editor of the first textbook of toxicology, Casarett & Doull's Toxicology: The Basic Science of Poisons, published in 1975. This seminal textbook is now in its 8th edition and continues to be the most comprehensive text of toxicology. Doull was also the main driving force behind establishing a professional certification for toxicologists (1979), the Diplomate of the American Board of Toxicology (DABT); he served as the president of the American Board of Toxicology in 1982/83.

Doull served on the council of the National Institute of Environmental Health Sciences (NIEHS) and was a member of the Presidential Clean Air Commission. He has chaired the Committee on Toxicology of the National Research Council of the National Academy of Sciences and served on scientific advisory panels of EPA, NIOSH, FEMA and others and consulted with many governmental, state, industrial and private organizations. He was active until shortly before his death.

In the introductory chapter of Casarett and Doull's Toxicology: The Basic Science of Poisons, Doull wrote "toxicology, like medicine, is both a science and an art." He goes on to say that "the science of toxicology is defined as the observational and data-gathering phase, whereas the art of toxicology is the predictive phase of the discipline. He contributed extensively to the science phase of toxicology early in his career. However, his passion has always been towards the art of toxicology.

During his tenure at the University of Kansas Medical Center, Doull mentored trainees, including David L. Eaton, who earned his Ph.D. under Doull and Curtis Klaassen in 1978 and later served as President of the Society of Toxicology.

== Computer assisted teaching ==
Doull was dedicated to his avocation or hobby, the use of computers in medical education. Under the leadership of Chair Edward J. Walaszek, and with the innovative programs developed by Doull, the department became pioneers in the use of computers in medical education. This allowed the department to reduce the number of lectures and exploit more active learning strategies where faculty function more as facilitators and mentors.

== Awards and honors ==
- 1993 – Merit Award of the Society of Toxicology in recognition of distinguished contributions to toxicology throughout an entire career
- 1996 – Founder's Award from the Chemical Industry Institute of Toxicology
- 1996 – Honorary Doctor of Pharmacy, University of Kuopio, Finland
- 1996 – Distinguished Service Award, American College of Toxicology
- 2008 – Inaugural Founder's Award of the Society of Toxicology for outstanding leadership in fostering the role of toxicological sciences in safety decision-making
- 2012 – Mildred S. Christian Career Achievement Award, Academy of Toxicological Sciences
- 2013 - AACT Career Achievement Award

== Sources ==
Klaassen, C.D. (ed.) Casarett and Doull's Toxicology. The basic science of poisons. 8th ed. McGraw-Hill Education, 2013. ISBN 978-0-07-176925-9. Dedication to Dr. Doull.
