= Ecogenetics =

Branch of genetics

Ecogenetics is a branch of genetics that studies genetic traits related to the response to environmental substances. Or, a contraction of ecological genetics, the study of the relationship between a natural population and its genetic structure.

Ecogenetics principally deals with effects of preexisting genetically-determined variability on the response to environmental agents. The word environmental is defined broadly to include the physical, chemical, biological, atmospheric, and climate agents. Ecogenetics, therefore, is an all-embracing term, and concepts such as pharmacogenetics are seen as subcomponents of ecogenetics. This work grew logically from the book entitled Pollutants and High Risk Groups (1978), which presented an overview of the various host factors i.e. age, heredity, diet, preexisting diseases, and lifestyles which affect environmentally-induced disease.

The primary intention of ecogenetics is to provide an objective and critical evaluation of the scientific literature pertaining to genetic factors and differential susceptibility to environmental agents, with particular emphasis on those agents typically considered pollutants. It is important to realize though that ones genetic makeup, while important, is but one of an array of host factors contributing to overall adaptive capacity of the individual. In many instances, it is possible for such factors to interact in ways that may enhance or offset the effect of each other.

Red blood cell conditions There is a broad group of genetic diseases that result in either producing or predisposing affected individuals to the development of hemolytic anemias. These diseases include abnormal haemoglobin, inability to manufacture one or the other of the peptide globin chains of the haemoglobin, and deficiencies of the Embden-Meyerhoff monophosphate.

Liver metabolism Individuals lacking the ability to detoxify and excrete PCB's may have a high risk of total liver failure in conjunction with certain ecological conditions.

Cardiovascular diseases The pathologic lesion of atherosclerosis is a plaque-like substance that thickens the innermost and middle of the three layers of the artery wall. The thickening of the intimal and medial layers results from the accumulation of the proliferating smooth muscle cells that are encompassed by interstitial substances such as collagen, elastin, glycosaminoglycans, and fibrin.

Respiratory diseases There are three genetically-based respiratory diseases that can directly correspond with ecological functions and induce disease. These include lung cancer and the upper and lower respiratory tract associated with a serum Ig A deficiency.

== See also ==
- Endocrine disruptor
- Paraoxon
- Paraoxonase
- Pharmacogenetics
- Xenobiotic
- Xenoestrogen
