= Toxicology and Applied Pharmacology =

- Discipline: Toxicology
- Language: English
- Edited by: Lawrance H. Lash

Publication details
- Publisher: Elsevier
- Frequency: 24/year
- Impact factor: 3.3 (2023)

Standard abbreviations
- ISO 4: Toxicol. Appl. Pharmacol.

Indexing
- ISSN: 0041-008X

Links
- Journal homepage; Online archive

Toxicology and Applied Pharmacology is a semi-monthly peer-reviewed scientific journal covering research pertaining to the action of chemicals, drugs, or natural products on animals or humans. The journal covers mechanistic approaches to the physiological, biochemical, cellular, or molecular understanding of toxicologic and pathologic lesions and to methods used to describe these responses.

== Abstracting and indexing ==
The journal is abstracted and indexed in Index Medicus/MEDLINE/PubMed. According to the Journal Citation Reports, the journal has a 2023 impact factor of 3.3.
