= University of Washington School of Public Health =

Public health school of the University of Washington

School of Public Health
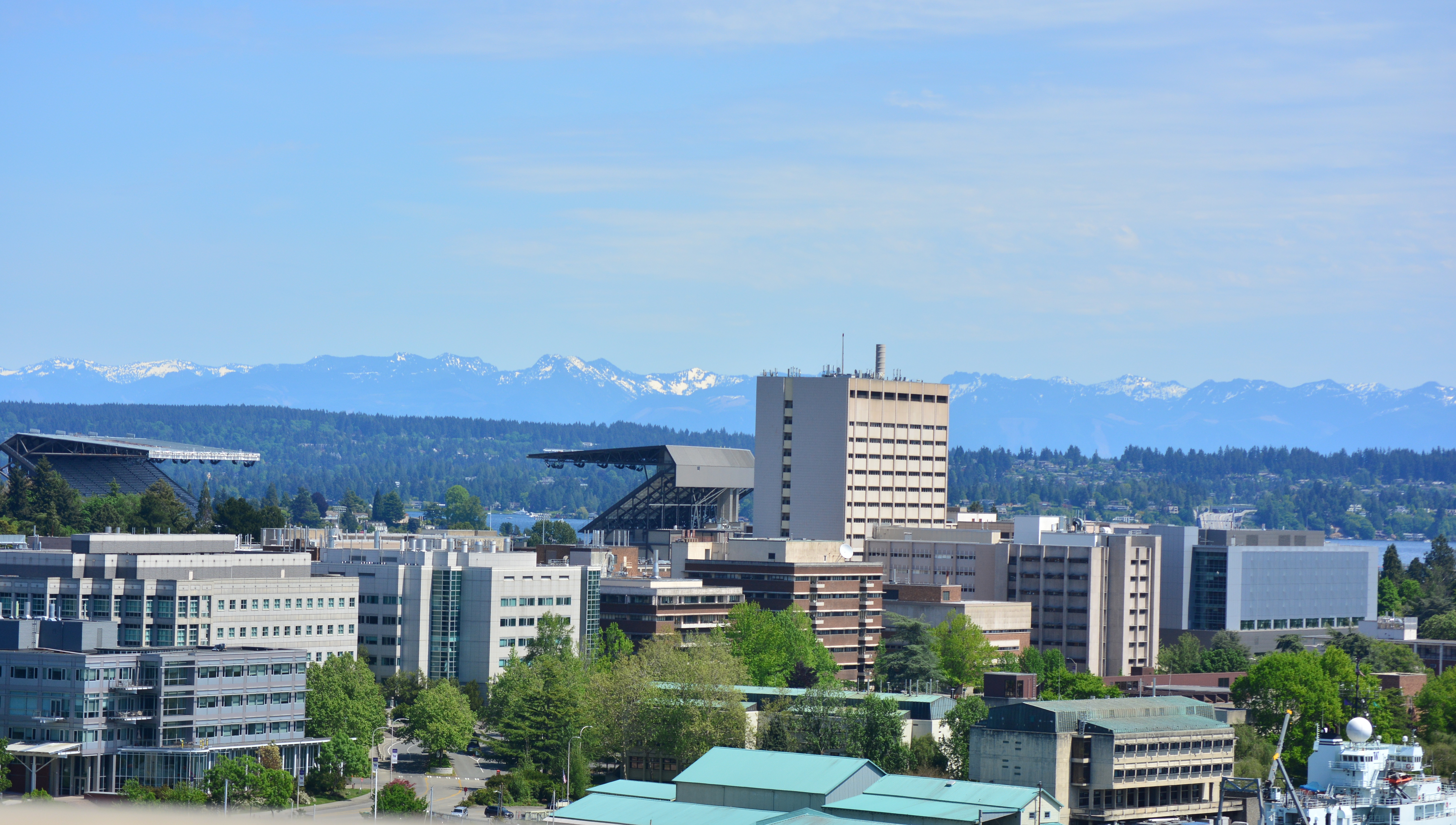
- The School of Public Health at the University of Washington Health Sciences Center
- Type: Public school of public health
- Established: 1970
- Parent institution: University of Washington
- Budget: $241 million
- Dean: Hilary Godwin
- Academic staff: 244
- Administrative staff: 543
- Students: 1,704
- Undergraduates: 696
- Postgraduates: 1,008
- Location: Seattle, Washington, U.S. 47°38′57″N 122°18′26″W
- Campus: Urban
- Website: sph.washington.edu

The University of Washington School of Public Health is the public health school at the University of Washington in Seattle. It is also the only public health school in the Northwestern United States.

The School is accredited through the Council on Education for Public Health. It ranks among the United States' best schools for public health. U.S. News & World Report ranked the school sixth among all public health schools in its last survey of this discipline (2014).

== History ==
The school was founded on July 1, 1970, with four departments: Biostatistics, Environmental Health, Epidemiology, and Health Systems & Population Health (formerly Health Services).

The Department of Global Health is the newest department and was established jointly with the School of Medicine in late 2006. The Bill & Melinda Gates Foundation, also located in Seattle, partnered with the University of Washington to establish the department.

The Department of Environmental Health changed its name to the Department of Environmental & Occupational Health Sciences in 2003.

The Online MPH Program is a partial distance learning public health program in the Department of Health Systems and Population Health. This program is designed for working professionals that began in 1980 with money from a Bureau of Health Professions Special Project Grant. It has options for a Master in Public Health (MPH) degree, a Graduate Certificate in Public Health, or single courses. It was called the Extended MPH Degree Program and later the Executive MPH (MPH) until being renamed the Online MPH Program in 2020.

== Academics ==
The School of Public Health has five departments: Biostatistics;Environmental and Occupational Health Sciences; Epidemiology; Health Systems and Population Health (formerly Health Services); and Global Health. In addition, there are interdisciplinary programs in maternal and child health, nutritional sciences, and public health genetics.

The School of Public Health confers the following graduate degrees: MPH (Master of Public Health), MS, MHIHIM (Master of Health Informatics and Health Information Management), MHA (Master of Health Administration), and PhD. For undergraduate students, the School offers a major in Public Health (BA or BS), the Department of Environmental & Occupational Health Sciences offers a major in Environmental Health (BS), and the Department of Health Systems and Population Health offers a BS in Health Informatics and Health Information Management. Faculty within the Department of Environmental & Occupational Health Sciences have held university-wide administrative leadership roles, including toxicologist David L. Eaton, who served as founding Director of the Center for Ecogenetics and Environmental Health (CEEH) and Dean of The Graduate School.
