= Society of Toxicology =

- Formation: 1961
- Headquarters: Reston, Virginia
- Location: United States
- Official language: English
- President: John B. Morris
- Website: http://www.toxicology.org/

The Society of Toxicology (SOT) is a learned society (professional association) based in the United States that supports scientific inquiry in the field of toxicology.

== Goals ==
The SOT is committed to creating a safer and healthier world by advancing the science of toxicology. The Society promotes the acquisition and utilization of knowledge in toxicology, aids in the protection of public health, and facilitates disciplines. SOT's definition of toxicology is 'the study of the adverse effects of chemical, physical or biological agents on living organisms and the ecosystem, including the prevention and amelioration of such adverse effects.'

The society organizes an annual meeting (usually in the early spring) and several smaller colloquia via its special interest sections and groups. It publishes the journal Toxicological Sciences, as well as public position papers and guidelines on conflicts of interest in toxicology.

== Membership ==
Full membership of the society is restricted to people with significant published work and/or professional experience in toxicology and members are bound by a Code of Ethics. There are also several categories of associate and student membership for people who do not fulfill the professional requirements for full membership. The Society has more than 8,000 members from 70 countries.

== Leadership ==
SOT is run by a team of full-time board members, called councilors. The councilors are selected by other full SOT members and other SOT members who manage the affairs of SOT. The elections are made by ballot.
