= History of the Ruhr =

The actual boundaries of the Ruhr vary slightly depending on the source, but a good working definition is to define the Lippe and Ruhr as its northern and southern boundaries respectively, the Rhine as its western boundary, and the town of Hamm as the eastern limit.

In the Middle Ages, local power was vested primarily in the counts (Grafen) of Berg, Mark and Cleves. The left bank of the Rhine was held by the Archbishop of Cologne. The Hellweg was an important trade route crossing the region from Duisburg to Dortmund and beyond as far as the rivers Weser and Elbe. The most important towns of the region were concentrated along the Hellweg.

As a result of the Congress of Vienna, the entire area came under the control of Prussia (the state had already gained possessions there). This event was almost concomitant with developments which would eventually make the region one of the most important industrial areas in the world.

In 1946, the state of North Rhine-Westphalia came into being centred on the Ruhr. Nowadays, its hitherto important coal and steel industries have drastically declined and the region is in a state of re-adjustment.

== Carboniferous period ==
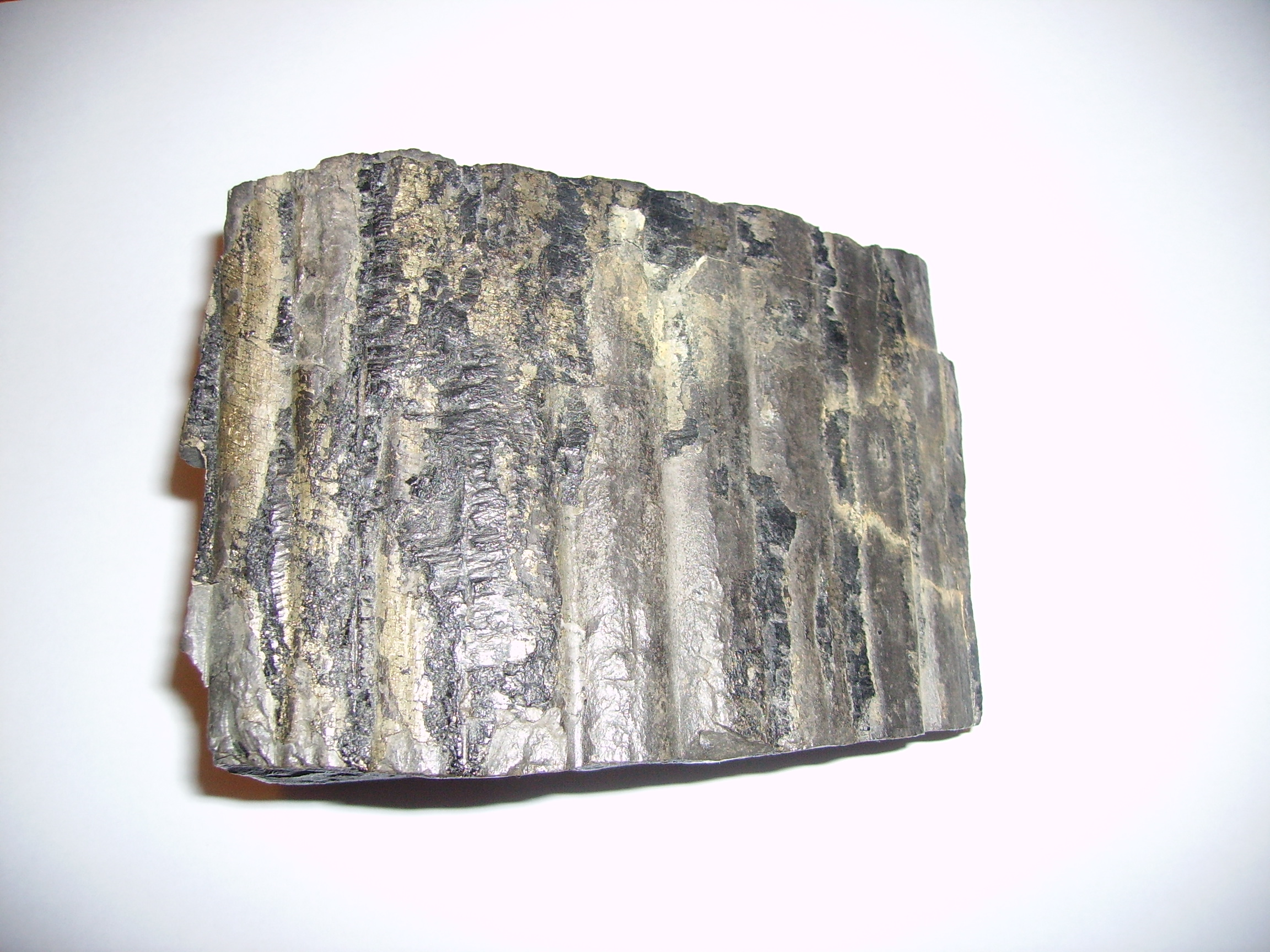
Sigillara specimen (bark removed), found in the Nordstern mine, Flöz Zollverein 2/3 at a depth of 1000m

During the Carboniferous Period, in the Paleozoic era, which began 360 million years ago and ended 300 million years ago, layers of slate, coal and sandstone were formed. 400 to 300 million years ago, new mountains were uplifted during the Variscan mountain-building period.

During the Silesian period, layers were deposited which became seams of coal over a period lasting millions of years. During this period there was a constant shifting between marshy conditions and overflowing seas such that the depositing of plant material and sediment from the sea resulted in the current situation of coal layers separated by stone layers.

The main representatives of flora in the coal marshes were of the genus Lepidodendron and genus Sigillaria, tree-like plants, which belong to the plant classification Lycopodiophyta. Members of both genus reached heights of up to 40 meters with a trunk diameter of over a meter.

== Cretaceous Period ==
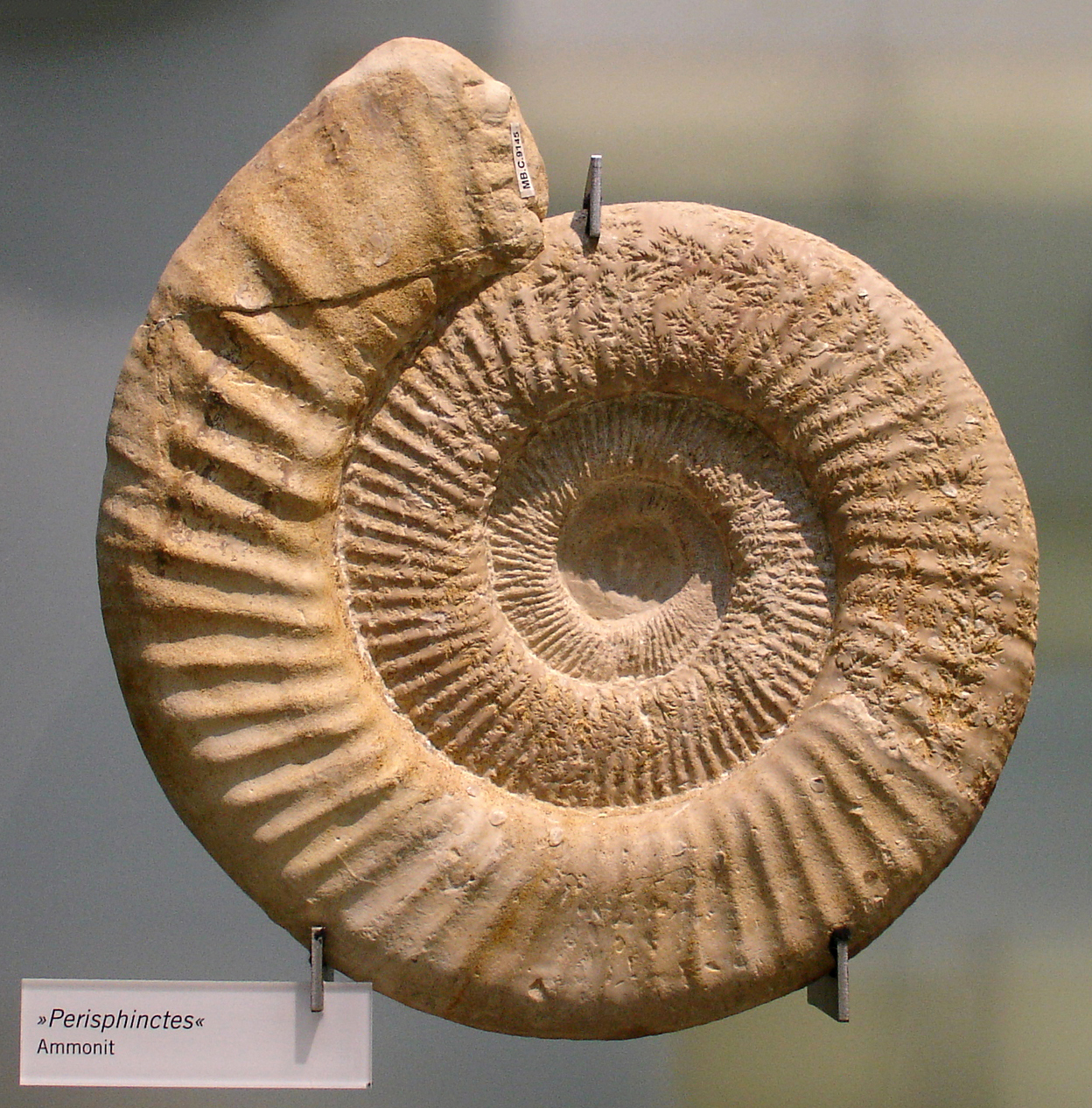
Ammonite in the Museum of Natural History in Berlin

In the Cretaceous, 135 million to about 66 million years ago, the region was submerged under a tropical ocean. In its waters lived ammonites. On the floor of the sea, a thick layer of marl formed. The sediments covered the layers of carbon and contained also the shells of giant ammonites.

== Quaternary ==
The Ice Age brought changes between warm and cold weather. During the Drenthe Stadium of the Wolstonian Stage, an ice sheet over Northern Germany covered the Ruhr and reached as far as the northern hills of the Central Uplands. The shape of the middle and lower Ruhr valley is due to meltwaters and the powerful force of the ice. Meltwater from the glaciers flowed westwards through the Ruhr valley. Where Essen lies today, this flow was temporarily hindered by a barrier of ice and rocky debris, forming an enormous lake which filled the valley at Schwerte.

== Pre-history ==
- 80,000 B.C. – The region of the present-day Ruhr was already settled during the Neanderthal period, around 80,000 years ago. During the building of the Rhine-Herne Canal in 1911, stone tools and traces of encampment with bones from woolly rhinoceros, bison and mammoth were found in Herne. Humanoids also settled elsewhere in the Emscher valley. Similar finds in the 1960s were made in Bottrop.
- 8700 BC. – In November 1978 stone-age flint instruments were found on the Kaiserberg in Duisburg which belong to the later phases of the last Ice Age and can be dated to about 9000 to 8000 BC. The oldest remains of modern humans in the area of the current Ruhr stem from the early Middle Stone Age. They were discovered in Spring 2004 in the Blätterhöhle in Hagen-Hohenlimburg.
- 6000–4500 BC – several settlements are known in the regions of Bochum, Hagen and Dortmund from the Linear Pottery culture and the Rössen culture. In Spring 2004, the skeletons of several humans from the Michelsberg culture were discovered in the Blätterhöhle in Hagen-Hohenlimburg. Among them was the skeleton of a 17–22-year woman. These finds are the single source of information for burials from this period in the current Rhine-Ruhr district.

== Antiquity ==
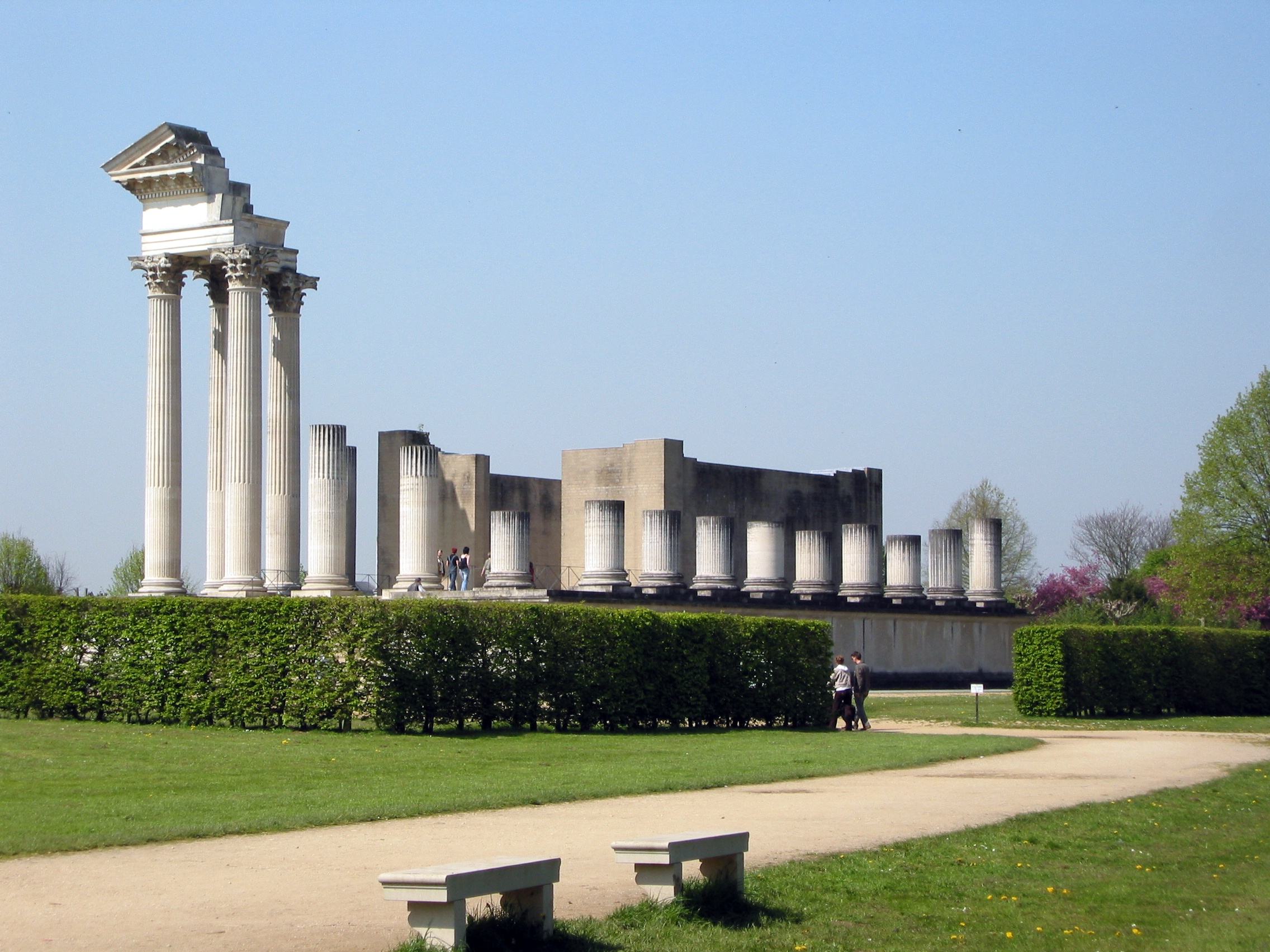
The Roman harbour temple of the Colonia Ulpia Traiana (Archäologischer Park Xanten)

- 100 BC – Threat to the Celtic inhabitants by the Germanic Sicambri
- 12 BC – Construction of the Roman camp Asciburgium on the present-day boundary between Moers and Duisburg, the Kastell Werthhausen in present-day Duisburg-Rheinhausen and the legionary camp Vetera at Birten left of the Rhine and therefore on the boundary of the district and the later province of Germania Inferior.
- 11 BC – In order to control the Sicambri settled on the right-bank of the Rhine, Drusus erects a military camp at Oberaden.
- 8 BC – Re-settlement of the Sicambri to the left bank of the Lower Rhine, under the control of Vetera. The military encampment in Oberaden was abandoned.
- 1 BC – Around this time Roman military bases were erected along the Lippe. The most important of these bases was situated at Haltern. After the Battle of the Teutoburg Forest in the autumn of 9 AD the Romans pull back to the left bank of the Rhine.
- 69 AD – Revolt of the Batavi, resulting in Asciburgium and Vetera being destroyed. At Vetera, a decisive battle is waged in the year 70, which the Romans win. The legion's camp is re-built.
- 85 – Transfer of the garrison from Asciburgium to present-day Duisburg-Werthausen so as to secure the Rhine crossing and the mouth of the Ruhr.
- 110 – The Colonia Ulpia Traiana, near to present-day Xanten, receives Roman town rights.
- 275 – The Colonia Ulpia Traiana is extensively damaged by a Frankish attack. In its place arises the mighty fortress of Tricensimae.
- 407 – Under Caesar Honorius the Rhine boundary of the Western Roman Empire is given up.
- 420 – The first traces of a Frankish settlement in Duisburg have been shown to stem from the 5th century, in the area of the old market. It lay immediately on the bank of the Rhine, as it then flowed.
- 428 – Around this time, Chlodio assumed the leadership of the Salian Franks; he is the first historically-verifiable king. According to the accounts of Gregory of Tours he lived in a district called "Dispargium" (possibly Duisburg or a castle on the Flanders Maas).
- 556 – Beginning of the struggle between Franks and Saxons

== Early Middle Ages ==
- 695 – At the end of the 7th century, Christian missionaries from France are active in the neighbouring districts of the Frankish Bructeri. A wave of Saxon settlers certainly halted the religious conversion. The story of the failed mission is reflected in the Golden Legend, in which the work of Black Ewald and Fair Ewald, who were engaged in missionary work in Aplerbeck, came to a violent end in 695.
- 740 – Assumed establishment of the Königshof in Duisburg.
- 775 – The army of the Franks under Charlemagne conquers the Sigiburg, as well as the Eresburg near Niedermarsberg a year later. They were laid out as Reichshofs.
- 796 – Liudger founds Werden Abbey.
- 863 – Normans over-winter on Bislich Island at Xanten and destroy the local church.
- 870 – At Essen Abbey, founded by the Saxon noble Altfrid, the abbey church is inaugurated.
- 880 – Normans sack Birten.
- 883 – Regino von Prüm reports that Normans are over-wintering in the oppidum diusburh (Duisburg) having conquered it. The Burg Broich in Mülheim an der Ruhr is erected, probably as a reaction to these repeated Viking raids. It also guards the ford across the Ruhr by the Hellweg.
- 928 – King Henry I spends Easter in Dortmund.
- 929 – Reich synod in Duisburg. Between 922 and 1016, 18 residences in Duisburg by the King are mentioned in documents.
- 938 – King Otto I holds an imperial council (Hoftag) in Steele.
- 941 – Otto I (the Great) stays for the first time in Dortmund. A few years later. he also celebrates Easter in the Rhineland Palatinate. The common usage as pfalz underlines their importance. The Hellweg is an important connecting road of the Ottonischen kingdom. Along this trade route lie Dortmund and other old towns of the Ruhr, such as Duisburg and Essen. The Königshof in Duisburg is extended to a Königspfalz.
- 971 – Mathilde, granddaughter of Otto I becomes abbess of Essen Abbey.
- 978 – At a Reichsversammlung (Reich assembly) in Dortmund, in the presence of Ottos II, the decision was made to campaign against the Franks.
- 992 – On 7 May, the young Otto III receives ambassadors of the West Frankish king in Duisburg.
- 993 – Reich Assembly of Otto III in Dortmund. Among other matters, the dispute between Bishop Dodo von Münster and Mettelen Abbey is decided in favour of the monastery.

== High Middle Ages ==
- 1000 – Initial stages of the construction of churches in the romanesque style, like for example the Stiepeler Dorfkirche or the St.-Vinzentius-Kirche.
- 1002 – Henry II receives homage in Duisburg from bishops of Lorraine and the archbishop of Liege.
- 1005 – Synod of King Henry II in Dortmund.
- 1012 – Sophia, daughter of Otto II becomes abbottess of the Essen Stift.
- 1033 – The Benedictine Abbey in Werden is awarded rights over shipping on the Ruhr by King Conrad II - for the stretch from Werden to its mouth,
- 1041 – Essen receives rights to a market.
- 1073 – Under Essen abbess, Svanhild of Essen, the parish chapel is erected on the Stoppenberg. In the 12th century it becomes the abbey church of a convent of Premonstratensians.
- 1122 – Count Gottfried of Cappenberg founds the first Premonstratensian foundation in the German-speaking lands, the Cappenberg Abbey in Selm. Furthermore, he gives over his castle and his fortune to the young order. Gottfried thereby becomes the last of the mighty counts of Cappenberg. His younger brother Otto of Cappenberg was godfather of Frederick I of Staufen. In 1155, Otto received as a gift from the recently crowned king the famous Cappenberg bust reliquary, a reliquary in the form of a bust of Frederick.
- 1123 – Kamp Abbey becomes the first Cistercian monastery in the German-speaking area.
- 1145 – The Knights Hospitallers opens its first foundation on German soil, by the walls of Duisburg, and builds the Marienkirche (church) there.
- 1152–1154 – A few months after his election to King, Frederick I of Staufen (Barbarossa) convenes a council (Hoftag) in Dortmund. But two years later, he and his retinue convene in the Palatinate. On both occasions, the mighty Duke of Saxony, Henry the Lion, is also present.
- 1160 – The County of Mark comes into being as a result of the division of the inheritance of the Count von Berg.
- 1173 – Emperor Frederick Barbarossa grants Duisburg the right to hold two fortnightly cloth fairs annually.
- 1199 – Completion of the Isenburg at Hattingen as the new power centre of the County of Isenberg an der Ruhr.
- 1200 – In Dortmund, large town walls are erected around the town. Its course is still retained in the inner city in the form of an embankment ("Wälle").
- 1225 – Murder of the archbishop of Cologne, Engelbert I of Cologne, by Frederick of Isenberg. Frederick is executed, the larger part of the Grafschaft Isenberg an der Ruhr falls to his relative, the Count von der Mark. The Isenburg and the castle and town of Nienbrügge are razed. The Isenbergers had to accommodate themselves to the County of Limburg.
- 1225–1226 Settlers from Nienbrügge were settled in Ham between the Ahse and Lippe rivers by Count Adolphus of the Mark and received town rights from him in 1226. The old designation of Ham, a tongue of land between two rivers, becomes the name of the town, Hamm.
- 1228 – The Archbishop of Cologne takes over the Vest Recklinghausen.
- 1240 – The Dortmund Council obtained a house on the Markt vom Grafen von Dortmund. For centuries it was the Rathaus of the Reichsstadt.
- 1243 – The Wasserburg Strünkede in Herne is first mentioned in connection with a feud between Cologne and Cleves. Since the 12th century, the resident knight there, as an official of the Count of Cleves, is the guarantor of Cleve influence on the middle Emscher. The sphere of rule of Strünkede extends temporarily from Buer in the West via Herne and Castrop to Mengede in the East.
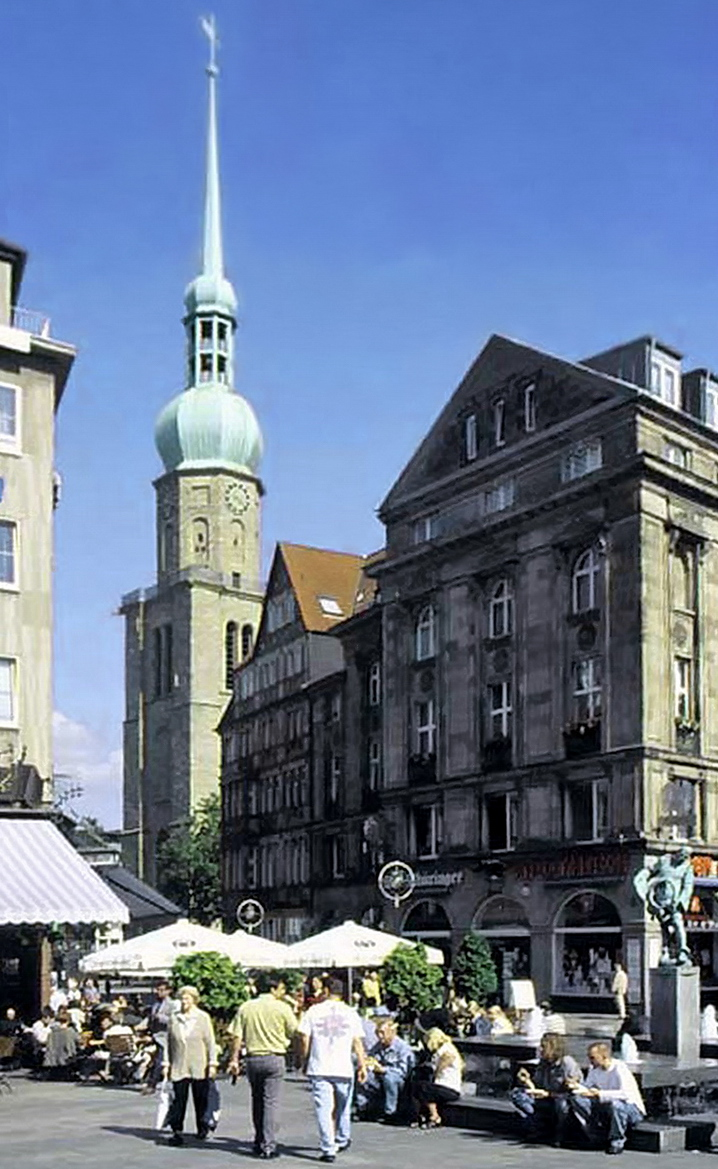
- Historic cobbles – in Dortmund, on the Old Market, two medieval trade routes meet at the tower of St. Reinold's Church.
  1244 – The association of the ministeriales of the Essen Abbey and the citizens of the town of Essen arrange for the Essen Town Walls to be erected.
- 1248 – The free imperial cities of Dortmund and Duisburg adhere to the 'anti-king' William II of Holland.

== Late Middle Ages ==
- 1253 – On a bridge over the Lippe in Werne, Dortmund, Soest, Münster und Lippstadt founded the Werne Federation (Werner Bund). This union of towns became a forerunner of the Hanseatic League. Dortmund soon took on a leading role for all Westphalian towns in the League.
- 1254 – Battle on the Wülferichskamp east of Dortmund
- 1283–1289 – War of the Limburg Succession. The weakened position of the ducal power, i.e. the Archbishop of Cologne, after the Battle of Worringen in 1288, hardens the powerful position enjoyed by the counts. In the Ruhr, this applies especially to the participants in the conflict – the counts of Berg and Mark, but also indirectly to the neutral Count of Cleves.
- 1290 – Duisburg is 'mortgaged' to the Count of Cleves – it ends up finally under the possession of Cleves (presumably because the Emperor did not have enough finance at his disposal to buy it back).
- 1321 – Count Engelbert II of the Mark awards Bochum town rights (he is celebrated today in the Engelbert Fountain).
- 1350 – The Black Death reaches the Ruhr.
- 1371 – The erection of a toll-booth on the Homberger Werth marks the founding of Ruhrort.
- 1388–1389 – Great Dortmund Feud, the imperial city of Dortmund tries to assert its independence, but becomes deeply indebted in doing so.
- 1389 – In a document by Count Engelbert III of the Mark is the first mention of the Sälzer zu Brockhausen. It is the first evidence for full-scale salt extraction in Unna.
- 1396 – The oldest written evidence of wild horses in the Emscher valley. The use of stock in the Emscherbruch between Waltrop and Bottrop was a privilege reserved for the nobility. Whereas towns were concentrated on the Hellweg and River Lippe, the region in between was sparsely populated
- 1398 – The County of Cleves is inherited by the Count of Mark
- 1397 – The Battle of Kleverhamm consolidates the position of the Count of the Mark.
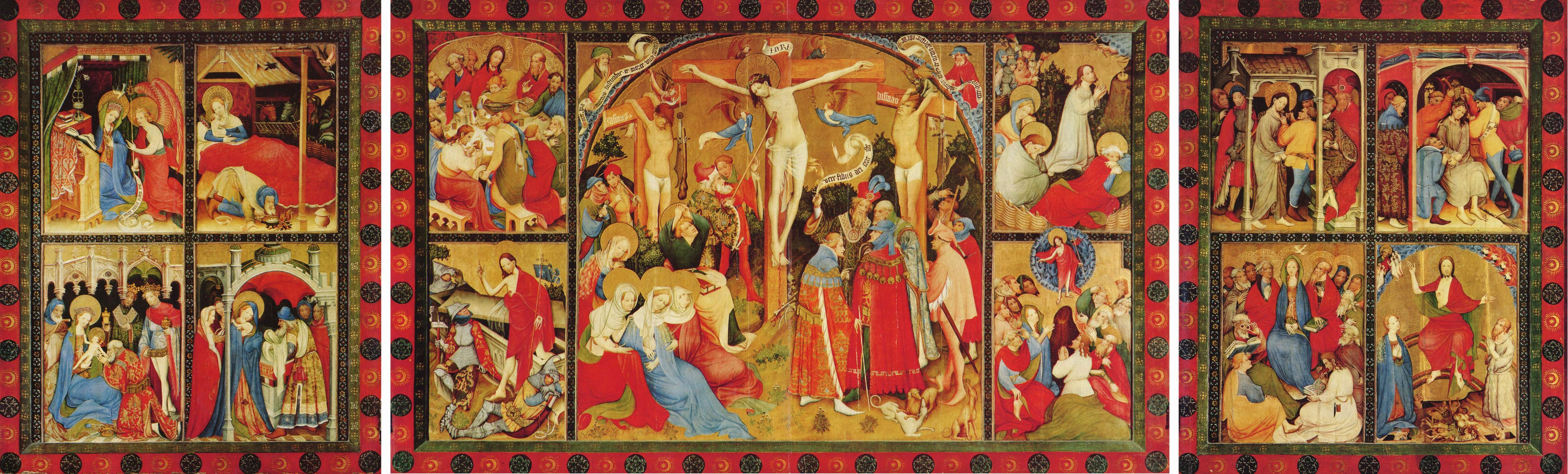
- Wildungen Altar
  1403 – The Wildungen Altar is completed – the first work of the Dortmund artist Conrad von Soest.
- 1424 – In the war between the two brothers Adolphus and Gerhard of the Mark, Hattingen is conquered by Berg troops and completely burned down, apart from two houses. The town must be re-built anew.
- 1444–1449 – Soest Feud, the towns of Dorsten and Recklinghausen in the Vest Recklinghausen are bases for the power struggle of the Archbishop of Cologne. In March 1445, a night attack by the Köln troops on the town walls of Duisburg is detected just in time and fended off. During action in the territory of Dortmund, the Steinerne Turm is besieged and damaged.
- 1486 – Two Landtag sittings agree to the raising of a special tax in the Grafschaft Mark for the benefit of Duke John II of Cleves. The relevant account book, the Schatboick in Mark, contains a note of all tax obligations and thereby contains much information on the district.

== Early Modern Period ==
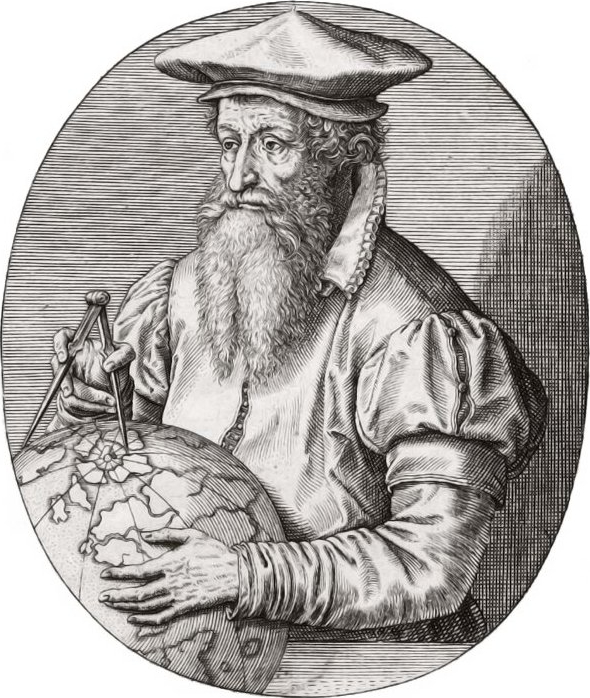
Gerhard Mercator

- 1508 – When the "French Sickness", syphilis, first appears in Dortmund the entire population (including children) is seriously affected.
- 1518–1519 – In Dortmund, a conflict breaks out between the citizens and the clergy over the privileges of the clergy, such as exemption from taxes. These events can viewed in connection with the Reformation.
- 1521 – Cleves-Mark acquires Jülich and Berg (which themselves had amalgamated) through inheritance (forming Jülich-Cleves-Mark).
- 1529 – Sweating sickness is rampant. Death follows a few hours after symptoms first occur. In Dortmund, within the first four days of the epidemic 497 people die from 500 affected by the disease.
- 1538 – In the imperial city of Dortmund, Baptists start to become active. Their activities are prevented by the council. When one of the preachers, Peter von Rulsem, decides not to cease his activities, he is executed.
- 1541 – In Wesel, printing is introduced. Two years later, it was being practised in Dortmund, which becomes one of the important centres of printing in the 16th century.
- 1543 – As a complement to the church's Latin Schools, the Council and citizens of Dortmund found a humanist grammar school. The teaching is influenced by the established grammar school in Emmerich and the Paulinum in Münster. One of the pupils at the Dortmund school is Hermann Hamelmann.
- 1552 – The map-maker, Gerhard Mercator, settles in Duisburg. Previously pursued by the Catholic Church, he is able to bring his important work to fruition in the liberal climate of the Duchy of Cleves.
- 1553 – The "Reformer of Westphalia", Hermann Hamelmann, professed for the first time in public his belief in the reformed faith, during the Festival of Trinity in Kamen, as a result of which he is forced to leave the town.
- 1559 – The Schola Duisburgensis becomes the Gymnasium Duisburg. One of the teachers is Gerhard Mercator, who gives instruction in mathematics.
- 1566 – One of Mercator's pupils, Johannes Corputius, captured a view of Duisburg on an accurate map, for the first time.
- 1568 – Uprisings in neighbouring Netherlands and the beginning of the Eighty Years' War.
- 1580 – Witch trials in Vest Recklinghausen reached a high point between 1580 and 1581. Executions were carried out on the Segensberg in Hochlar and on the Stimberg in the Haard, near Oer. Altogether 44 persons, predominantly women, were burned to death. In Märkish Witten at the same time, six females and one man fell were sentenced as witches.
- 1580 – Working coal mines were mentioned in the 'Städtebuch' of Bruyn and Hugenberg in Steele.
- 1583 – The Spanish general Mendoza with 21,000 foot soldiers and 2,500 knights stands before Orsoy. In Walsum, a camp is set up protected by ramparts.
- 1583–1589 – The Cologne War is waged across large regions of the Vest Recklinghausen, which thereby suffered badly from the war. The background to the war are the demands of the Archbishop and Elector of Cologne, Gebhard I of Waldburg, over the equality of the confession, connected with the intention to transform the Electorate of Cologne into a secular principality.
- 1587 – Dutch-occupied Ruhrort was besieged and conquered by Spanish troops during the Eighty Years' War.
- 1598 – The Spanish send troops into Vest Recklinghausen and the County of Mark. Among other towns, Recklinghausen was taken by General Francisco de Mendoza and his 24,000 soldiers. In 1599, his troops are before the town of Dortmund and the surrounding area is plundered. During the Eighty Years' War involving the Netherlands, the bordering areas of the Lower Rhine and Westphalia are crossed repeatedly by both Spanish and Dutch troops. Castrop, for example, suffers greatly from plundering.
- 1598 – In Holzwickede the development of mining is mentioned in documents, when Drost Bernhard von Romberg is mortgaged with the Kallberg sampt dem Erftstollen ("Kallberg including the Erft adits").
- 1599 – The plague breaks out in Dortmund thanks to Spanish troop movements.
- 1601 – Dutch mercenaries cause damage in Walsum.
- 1609 – The War of the Jülich succession begins. On 10 June, Brandenburg and Pfalz-Neuburg take on jointly the administration of the Duchy of Cleves in line with the Treaty of Dortmund.
- 1614 With the death of the last Duke of Jülich-Cleves-Mark, his land is divided. Berg goes to the Wittelsbach family, while Prussia acquires Cleves and Mark.
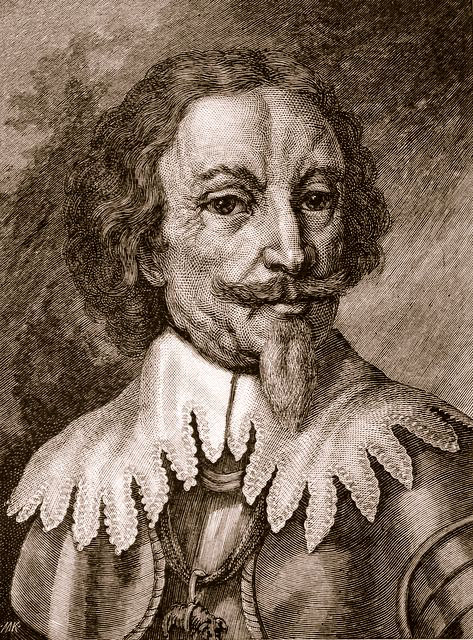
- Pappenheim allowed plundering in the County of Mark and pressured Dortmund.
  1618–1648 – Thirty Years' War, the rich city of Dortmund was repeatedly forced to hand over large amounts of money to either the Catholics or the Protestants. Until the Industrial Revolution, the city will not regain its former size. On the Lower Rhine, Duisburg and Wesel were repeatedly occupied by Dutch or Spanish troops. Essen does not fare any better.
- 1620 – The manufacture of arms, the important line of trade in Essen, reaches a peak with an annual production of around 15,000 rifles and pistols.
- 1621–1624 – The first war taxes are raised. General Gonzalo Fernández de Córdoba winters his 10,000 soldiers in the north of the County of Mark. Christian of Brunswick appears with 10,000 men.
- 1629 – In Amt Werne 30 people become victims of a witch hunt.
- 1632 – Gottfried Heinrich Graf zu Pappenheim occupies Dortmund and refrains from burning the town down on the payment of a ransom. On his journey through the County of Mark, 70 noble houses are plundered.
- 1635 – Hattingen is taken by the Swede, Wilhelm Wendt zum Crassenstein, and his 3,000 soldiers.
- 1647 – In a witch trial, the Witten peasant, Arndt Bottermann, is found guilty and executed. During the Thirty Years' War, witch hunts in Central Europe reached a high point. In Westphalia, many witch trials took place, but the case of Arndt Bottermann is one of the few to take place in the County of Mark.
- 1648 – The Treaty of Westphalia is agreed. This treaty formally ends both the Thirty Years' War and the Eighty Years' War. Nevertheless, the imperial city of Dortmund, a signee of the treaty, was occupied for a further two years by Swedish and Imperial troops until it handed over large sums of money. Dutch troops also remained for some time on the Lower Rhine.
- 1650 – Swedish war reparations of 17,000 Reich talers are to be met by taxes.

== Prussian Absolutism ==
Large areas of the Ruhr come under Prussian control. Ironworks are started up and coal-mining accelerates. Industry in general receives some direct and indirect encouragement from the Prussian state.

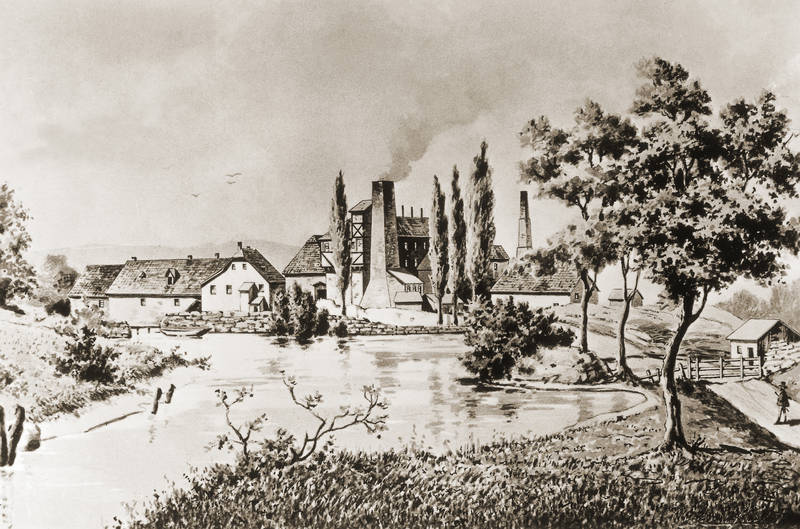
An early picture of St. Antony's Smeltery in (present-day) Oberhausen

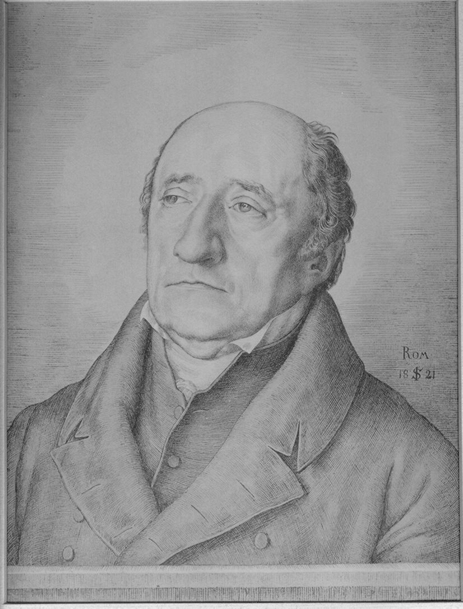
Freiherr vom Stein

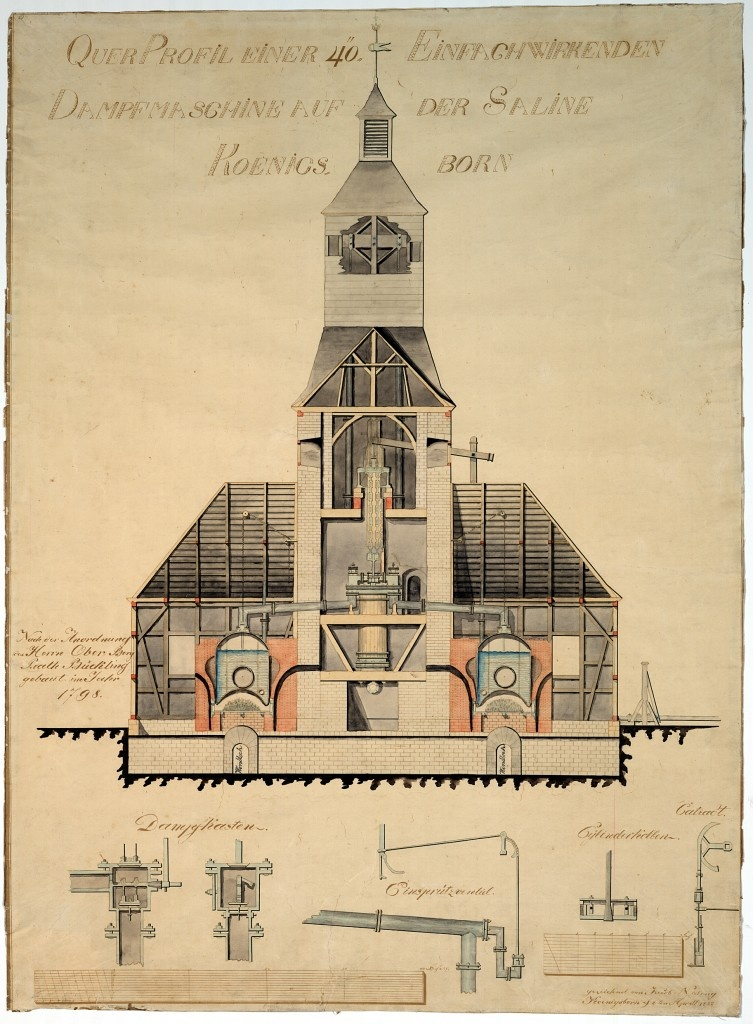
Cross-section of the steam engine erected at the Königsborn Saltworks in 1799 (drawing from 1822)

- 1655 – Brandenburg assumes temporary control of the Duchy of Cleves and Frederick William I, Elector of Brandenburg, arranges for the foundation of a University in Duisburg.
- 1666 – As a result of an agreement over inheritance, the Duchy of Cleves and the County of Mark pass permanently to Brandenburg.
- 1672 – During the Franco-Dutch War, French soldiers under Marshall Turenne invade the region. Amongst their actions, they burn down the Haus Steinhausen.
- 1674 – A permanent freight and passenger service by river is set up between Duisburg and Nijmegen (beurtvaart).
- 1706 – In Vest Recklinghausen (which is under the control of Cologne) the last of a total of 130 witch trials since 1514 takes place.
- 1716 – The Ruhrort Magistrat decide on the building of a harbour. This was the germ of the present-day Duisburg-Ruhrort Harbour.
- 1734 – The Königsborn Saltworks in Unna was founded by the Prussian state.
- 1736 – In Holzwickede, the Caroline Adit mined coal which supplied the Königsborn Saltworks.
- 1736 – Essen's first newspaper appeared. Published by the printer of books Johann Heinrich Wißmann under the title Neueste Essendische Nachrichten von Staats- und Gelehrten Sachen (Newest Essen News of State and Learned Matters). In 1775 Zacharias Gerhard Diederich Baedeker took over both the press and publishing sections.
- 1738 – The Mark Mining Office (mining office) was founded in Bochum. Among the largest deep mines of the County of Mark was the "Glückauf" mine in Gennebreck with 17 employees.
- 1755 – Frederick II commissioned Ludwig Philipp Freiherr vom Hagen and Johann Friedrich Heintzmann with the drawing-up of new mine and Knappschaft regulations.
- 1756–1763 – Seven Years' War. This was a major international conflict in which Prussian was aligned with Britain (and Hanover) among others, against France, Austria and Russia. Prussia was very nearly brought to its knees but appears to have been saved by the death of the Russian Empress Elizabeth and the more conciliatory attitudes of the new czar, Peter III. In 1758, the Battle of Rheinberg preceded the more crucial Battle of Krefeld during which Hanoverian/Prussian troops pushed the French army across the Rhine.
- 1758 – On 18 October, a new nine-meter high blast furnace of the St Antony Smeltery in Osterfeld (in present-day Oberhausen) was used for the first time. The first ore-based production in the district.
- 1766 – On 29 April, Frederick II issues the Revised Mining Ordinances for the Duchy of Cleves, the Principality of Meurs and the County of Mark
- 1769 – The Dortmundischen vermischten Zeitungen appeared for the first time, published by a member of the Essen publishing family Baedeker. This is the town's first newspaper.
- 1780 – The construction of the last of 16 Ruhr locks commissioned by Prussia was completed. These locks were necessary to circumvent obstacles such as weirs and were constructed in tandem with other measures such as widening and dredging needed to make the Ruhr navigable. It became extremely well used, primarily for coal, although traffic fell off with the later construction of railways and the advance of the coalfield northwards. At this time, coal was being extracted from shallow drift mines in the vicinity of the river. Of particular importance, a toll road, the Aktienstrasse, carried coal to the river at Mülheim an der Ruhr.
- 1781 – Founding of the Gute Hoffnung Smeltery in Sterkrade (in present-day Oberhausen). This soon came under the control of a member of the Krupp family.
- 1784 – Henry Frederick Karl Freiherr vom und zum Stein becomes director of the mining office in Wetter an der Ruhr. He encourages the development of mines and ironworks in the western areas of Prussia.
- 1787 – The Rauendahler Schiebeweg is opened in Sundern for the transporting of coal from mines to the Ruhr shipping lane. It is the first of several horse tramways in the Ruhr valley to copy the British model. Involved in the planning are Bergrat Eversmann and Oberbergrat Freiherr vom Stein.
- 1788 – The old Hellweg starts to be upgraded to more modern standards. This was encouraged by the Freiherr vom Stein. The Stift Essen also became involved and upgraded roads in their vicinity, connecting to the east to Kleve.
- 1794 – The French occupy the left bank of the Rhine.
- 1798 – The Liberal Arnold Mallinckrodt founded the Westfälischen Anzeiger in Dortmund, the leading newspaper in the region at the time. Carl Arnold Kortum was one of its employees.
- 1799 – In Unna-Afferde a steam engine was used for the first time in the Königsborn Saltworks. The new method of brine production produced such an increase in production that by the following year The saltworks was already occupying third place among all salt-producing companies in Prussia for its productivity.

== First half of the 19th century – Industrial Revolution ==
The Industrial Revolution advances in the Ruhr. At the start of the 19th century, the steam engine is used there for the first time, and Napoleonic measures abolish feudal influences. When the entire area comes under Prussian hegemony in 1815, further advances are made in transportation and encouragement of industry. By the 1830s, the important deep-lying coking-coal seams of the Emscher Basin are reached for the first time, railways make their appearance and in 1849 smelting iron ore with coke is successfully carried out for the first time in the Ruhr.

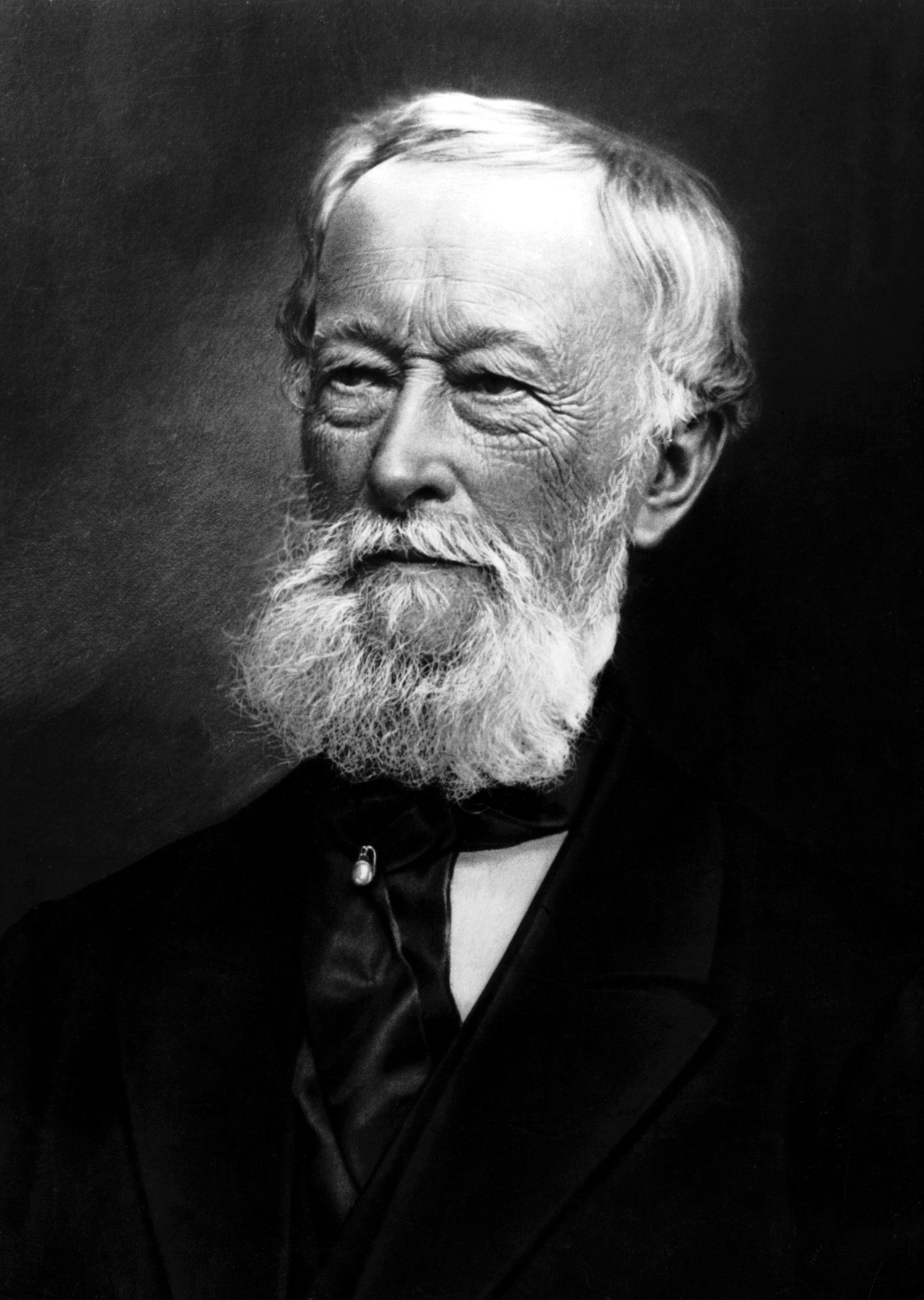
Alfred Krupp

- 1801 – The annexation of the left bank of the Rhine by the French was recognized in the Peace of Lunèville on 9 February 1801.
- 1801 – The first (but still imported) steam engine used in the Ruhr mines was employed in removing water in the Vollmond Mine in Werne (in present-day Bochum). The technician responsible, Franz Dinnendahl, founded a factory in Essen a few years afterwards and manufactured steam engines of his own design.
- 1802 – In August, Prussian troops occupy the former religious territories of Essen und Werden. As part of a secret agreement made with the French, they are intended as compensation for territories lost by Prussia on the left bank of the Rhine.
- 1803 – Reichsdeputationshauptschluss, as a result of secularisation the religious territories of Reichsabtei Werden and Stift Essen are dissolved. These territories are transferred eventually to Prussia. Duke Louis-Engelbert of Arenberg receives, as compensation for his left-bank principality, the Vest Recklinghausen and other areas.
- 1806–1813 – The Napoleonic Grand Duchy of Berg is in existence from October 1806 until 18 November 1813. Its departements include the Ruhr département, whose prefecture was based in Dortmund, and the Rhine département with prefecture in Düsseldorf. Freiherr Gisbert of Romberg zu Brünninghausen was appointed as prefect of the Ruhr département. The first ruler of Berg is Joachim Murat, Napoleon's brother-in-law. The French abolished tolls on the River Ruhr, just as they had previously abolished tolls on the Rhine (on the Rhine tolls extracted at Cologne had previously been a severe barrier to river traffic).
- 1808 – Napoleon issued a decree from Madrid on 12 December that abolished serfdom and bound labor etc.
- 1808 – Krupp sells its interest in the Gute Hoffnung Smeltery to a syndicate composed of Gottlob Jacoby, Heinrich Huyssen and the brothers Franz and Gerhard Haniel, who unite a couple of other iron works into the company
- 1809 – Napoleon introduced freedom to engage in a trade. The guilds were dissolved.
- 1809, 1811 Feudalism of the peasants was lifted by imperial decrees on 11 January 1809 and 13 September 1811.
- 1811 – In Essen Friedrich Krupp founds a Gussstahl foundry (but soon closes the business).
- 1811 – In Mülheim Johann Dinnendahl founds a factory to manufacture steam engines, the beginnings of the later Frederick William Smeltery.
- 1815 – Vienna Congress at the end of the Napoleonic Wars. Prussia regains its possessions in Westphalia and on the Rhine, to which are added the former Duchy of Berg and the territories of the former Reichsstadt (imperial city) and Grafschaft Dortmund. As a result, all territories on the Ruhr, Emscher and lower Rhine are united under one regime. The area from Gelsenkirchen north and eastward belongs to the Prussian Province of Westphalia while the area from Essen south and westward belongs to the Rheinprovinz. These boundaries would remain constant in the Free State of Prussia during the Weimar Republic.
- 1816 – The Year Without a Summer (on 25 June there was even a fall of snow) brings hunger.
- 1816 – The Bochum Mining College is founded. Leading personnel for the mines are trained there.
- 1816 – Henry Frederick Karl vom Stein settles in the Schloss Cappenberg in Selm. From 1826 on, he is the president of the first three Westphalian Provinziallandtag assemblies (provincial parliaments).
- 1818 – On 18 October, the university in Duisburg was shut down by an order of cabinet by Frederick William III. In the same year, Bonn University is re-founded. Large parts of Duisburg University Library as well as the University Sceptre are transferred to Bonn.
- 1819 – Friedrich Harkort founds his Mechanischen Werkstätten at the castle in Wetter an der Ruhr and manufactures steam engines.
- 1819 – Friedrich Krupp sets up in business on land outside the actual city of Essen, adjacent to the Limbecker Gate. By 1824, things had gone so badly he had to sell his house on the Flax Market in Essen and move into a house in the works itself. He died in 1826, but the works he established became the location for the later more-successful enterprise.
- 1827 – In Lünen the Gewerkschaft Eisenhütte "Westphalia" started up business.
- 1828 – Franz Haniel opens a shipyard in Ruhrort for the construction of steamers.
- 1837 – a shaft of the Kronprinz Mine (on the boundary of present-day Essen and Mülheim) succeeds for the first time in boring through the overlying chalk seam in the Northern coalfield to reach the coal seams below).
- 1838 – The Gesellschaft der Hardenbergischen Kohlebergwerke is the first joint stock company in the Ruhr.
- 1839 – According to the Prussian Regulativ über die Beschäftigung jugendlicher Arbeiter in den Fabriken (regulations on the employment of young workers in factories), the minimum age for child workers is nine years old and their working time is restricted to ten hours a day. Children cannot be employed on Sundays and Bank Holidays or during the night.
- 1839 – In the Gutehoffnung Smeltery, their first steam locomotive is built – called the Ruhr.
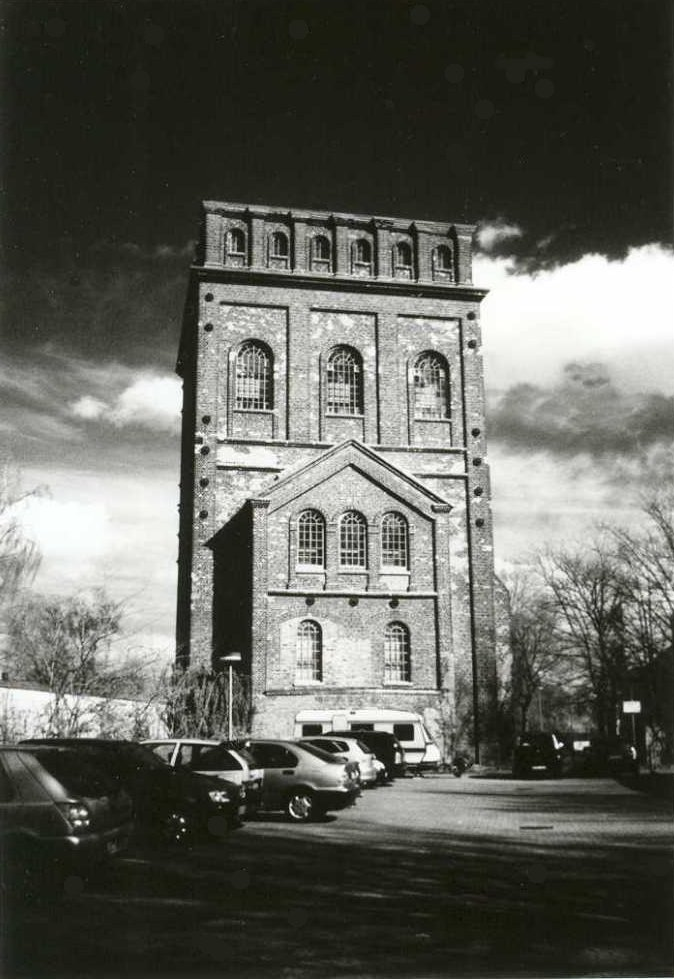
- At the end of the 19th century, Malakoff towers were built over the shafts of the deep mines. This picture shows the tower of the Julius-Philipp mine in Bochum South.
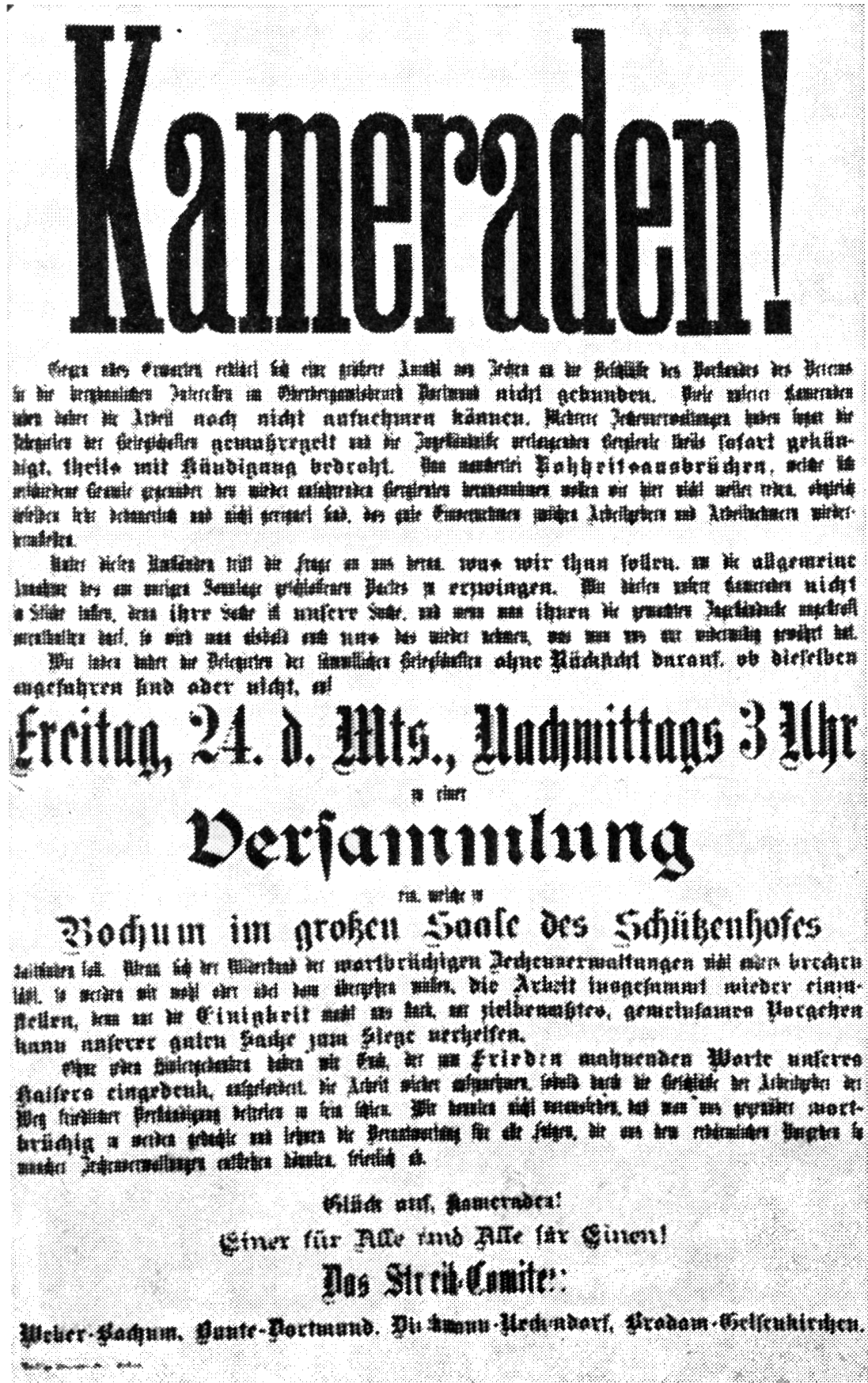
  Call for the Miners' Strike 1889
  1847 – Opening of the Cologne-Minden Railway. It is decisive for the industrial development of the Ruhr and follows the valley of the Emscher, via Duisburg, Oberhausen, Altenessen, Gelsenkirchen, Herne, Castrop und Dortmund, and from there further to Hamm and via Bielefeld to Minden.
- 1839 – Even while the railway was still being built in the northern part of the Ruhr, the Cologne banking house of Camphausen und Schaafhausen started to interest themselves in the resulting potential for growth in the Emscherland. The Cologne Mining Association was founded as an early Aktiengesellschaft of Ruhr mines (including shaft mines) in Northern Essen, among them the Carl Mine.
- 1847 – The first steam locomotive to travel along the Ruhr valley, on the Steele-Vohwinkler Railway
- 1849 – For the first time in the Ruhr, coke was used for steel production – in the Frederick William Smeltery in Mülheim.

== Second half of the 19th century – industry booms ==
The advances made in the first half of the century were built upon, producing a significant advance in production. In 1850, the district produced 2 million tonnes of coal, by 1913 it produced 114 million tonnes. Likewise, in 1850 it produced 11,500 tonnes of cast iron which rose by 1913 to 8.2 million tonnes. Coal production moved northwards as steam engine technology allowed the exploitation of deep coking coal seams (the earlier mines, generally nearer the River Ruhr, had tended to be drift mines exploiting the anthracite lying nearer the surface). 'Vertical' concerns came into being, with collieries, cokeries and ironworks under common ownership, and it was not uncommon to have all constituents located on the same site or close together.

- 1854 – In Hattingen, the Henrichshütte is founded. Initially, ore is available in the immediate neighborhood. Later the Ruhr Valley Railway transported ore and coal to the works. In Hörde a blast furnace using coke was also employed for the first time. It was meant to work with the local Kohleneisenstein, a mixture of Eisenstein with clay and coal.
- 1855 – Under the supervision of William Thomas Mulvany the sinking of the first shaft of the Hibernia Mine in Gelsenkirchen is begun. As a technical innovation, tubbings was used for the shaft lining. In the following years, Mulvaney had a hand in the opening of several mines in the Emscherniederung, among them the Shamrock Mine in Herne und the Erin Mine in Castrop. The money came from Irish and Belgian financiers. Their coal was transported over the Cologne-Minden Railway.
- 1856 – A railway along the right bank of the Rhine connects Oberhausen with Arnhem in the Netherlands.
- 1857 – The economic crisis of 1857 leads to a drop in sales for coal and steel, with ensuing social effects for employees.
- 1858 – The Association for Mining Interests in the Head Mining Office District of Dortmund, in short – the mining association, based in Essen, is founded on 17 December.
- 1862 – The Bergisch-Märkische Eisenbahn-Gesellschaft inaugurates their Witten/Dortmund–Oberhausen/Duisburg railway between Witten/Dortmund and Oberhausen/Duisburg as the second important connection between East and West based in the South of the Ruhr.
- 1862 – In Mülheim an der Ruhr a factory opens for the production of coke briquettes at the Wiesche Mine. It is the first installation of this type in the Ruhr.
- 1867 – August Thyssen with several relatives founds das Eisenwerk "Thyssen-Foussol & Co." in Duisburg. (This is dissolved in 1870 and a new company founded in Müheim in 1871. Thyssen was involved in several organizations which were only later unified under one holding company)
- 1869 – The industrialist Alfred Krupp starts building the Villa Hügel in Southern Essen. In the 'Grundbuch der Stadt' he enters the estate as a family house with garden. Four years later, the building is finished.
- 1870–1871 – The Franco-Prussian War is won by the united German states. Founding of the German Reich.
- 1871–1873 – The so-called Gründerjahre. The French reparations lead to a building boom. In the Ruhr, numerous mining companies are founded with the help of the capital flowing in from France.
- 1873 – Crisis (Gründerkrise) – because of speculation by German investors, capital from the French reparations flowed into Ruhr mining companies, without the additional capital requirements from the mine share certificates being covered. Steel production in the Ruhr dropped by 13%.
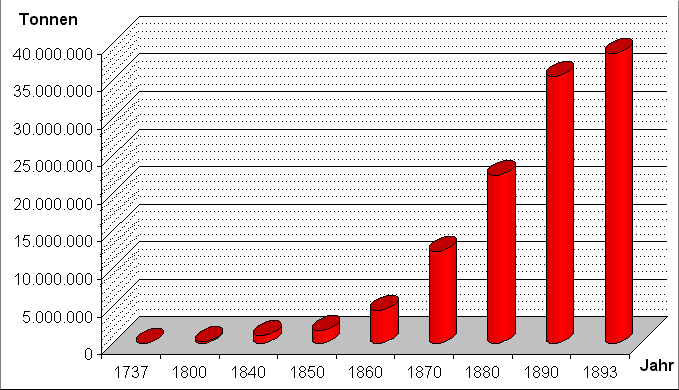
- Development of Demand for Coal in the Rhenish-Westphalian Coal Basin during the 19th. Century
  1882 – On 24 February 1882 fifteen Rheinish and Westfälish steelworks formed themselves into a cartel to protect themselves from competition.
- 1889 – A mass strike of miners spreads from Bochum to encompass the entire Ruhr. The workers demand a share in the profits of the companies whose production was stabilising after the years of the Gründerkrise. In the same year, the first permanent miners' union, the "Alten Verband" was founded in Dortmund-Dorstfeld. In 1894, a Christian union was also founded and in 1902 a Polish miners' union.
- 1892 – The Grillo Theatre is opened in Essen.
- 1893 – Formation of the Rhenish-Westphalian Coal Syndicate with its head office in Essen, as an association of a large number of Ruhr mines. Its aim is to regulate production, marketing and prices. Sales are organized at a central point.
- 1893 – In Essen the first electric tram in Rhine-Ruhr starts operating.

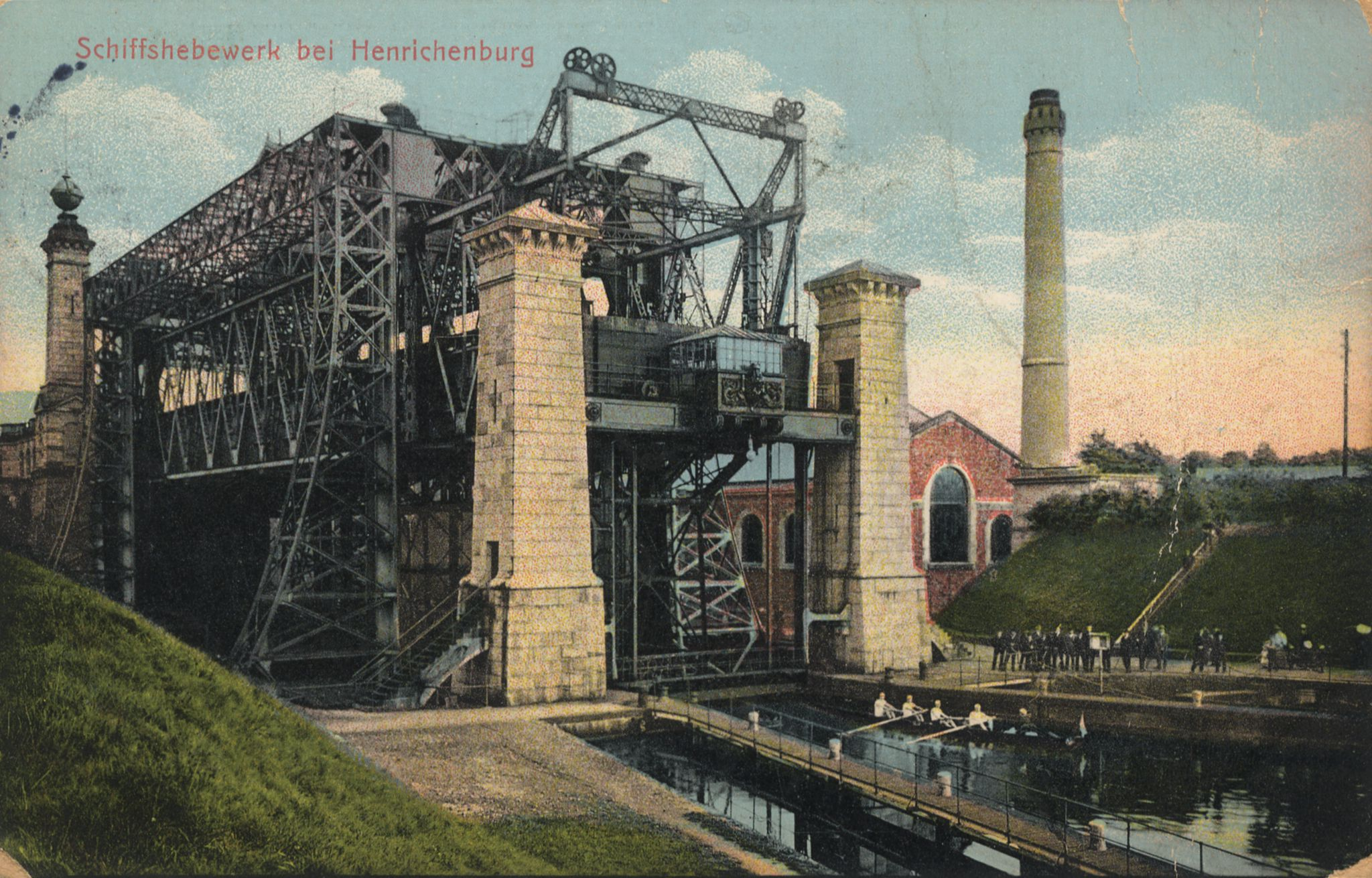
Schiffshebewerk (Boat Lift) on the Dortmund-Ems Canal

- 1895 – The later Social Democratic Reichstag Member Otto Hue becomes editor of the Berg- und Hüttenarbeiterzeitung of the Alten Bergarbeiterverbandes. Soon Hue, because of his job, becomes known as the Sprecher der Bergarbeiter (speaker for the miners).
- 1898 – The Rheinisch-Westfälischen Elektrizitätswerke (RWE) is founded.
- 1899 – The Emscher Cooperative is founded, primarily to deal with drainage and flooding measures in the Ruhr generally.
- 1899 – The Dortmund-Ems Canal is opened. William II arrives for the official opening of the port of Dortmund and the Henrichenburg boat lift. The canal becomes particularly important for the transporting of imported ore, especially Swedish ore routed via the Norwegian port of Narvik.

== First half of the 20th century (to 1945) ==
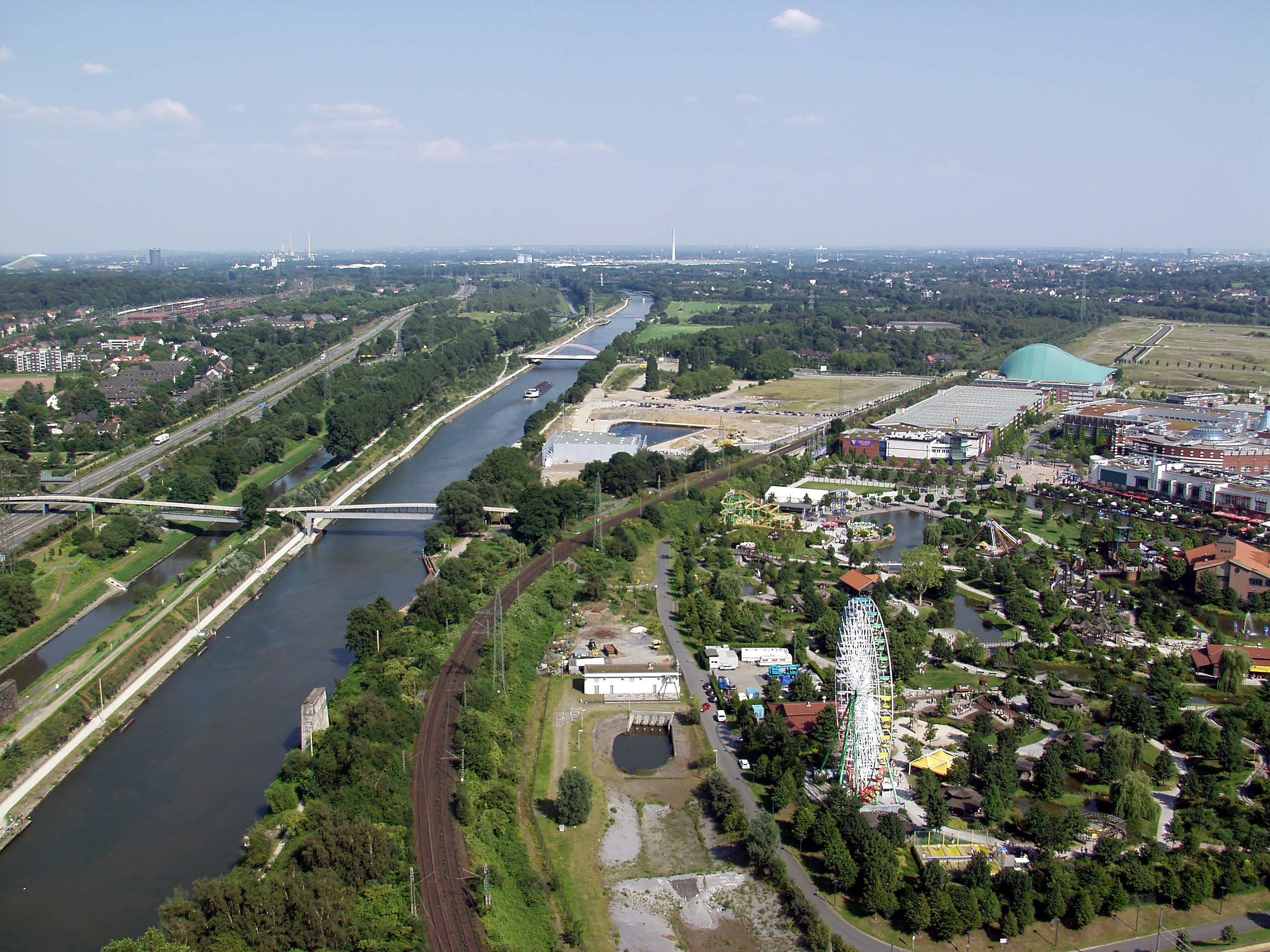
Current view of the Rhine-Herne Canal, showing the parallel River Emscher on its left

The coal and steel industries continue to expand, with the Ruhr reaching a position whereby its coal and steel production is in each case almost equivalent to the rest of continental Europe put together (excluding the USSR)

- 1904 – The businessman Otto Heinrich Flottmann from Herne receives a patent for the pneumatic drill. The use of the new drill in the Ruhr mining areas increases extraction levels markedly.
- 1905 – As a result of a district-wide strike, miners win a maximum 8-hour day.
- 1905 – For the purposes of extending the harbour at the mouth of the Ruhr, as desired by the Prussian Government, Ruhrort and Meiderich are incorporated into Duisburg.
- 1908 – The Zechenverband is founded on 22 January as an association of employers in the Ruhr.
- 1912 – Miners strike across the whole of the Ruhr. In response William II sends in the troops. The workers give up in the face of the imperial threat.
- 1912 – In Mülheim an der Ruhr, the Kaiser-William (today: Max-Planck) Institut für Kohlenforschung (institute for research into coal) is founded.
- 1913 – Under the influence of the work of Karl Imhoff on the cleaning-up of the Ruhr, the Ruhrreinhaltungsgesetz (law concerned with cleaning up the Ruhr) is introduced. At the same time, the work of the Ruhrtalsperrenvereins (the dams) is regulated by the Ruhrtalsperrengesetz (law concerned with the damming of the Ruhr). Both laws contribute significantly in ensuring the water supply of the growing conurbation.
- 1914 – Opening of the Rhine-Herne-Canal, which becomes the most-used inland canal in Europe. It makes a connection between the Rhine at Duisburg and Herne, from where it connects to the Dortmund-Ems-Canal.
- 1914–1918 – First World War, in the 'Hunger Winter' of 1916–17 shortages in the supply of food in Germany become chronic. The inhabitants of the Ruhr suffer especially.
- 1918 – The German Empire ends and Germany becomes a republic. The Kingdom of Prussia, of which the Ruhr is a part, becomes the Free State of Prussia.

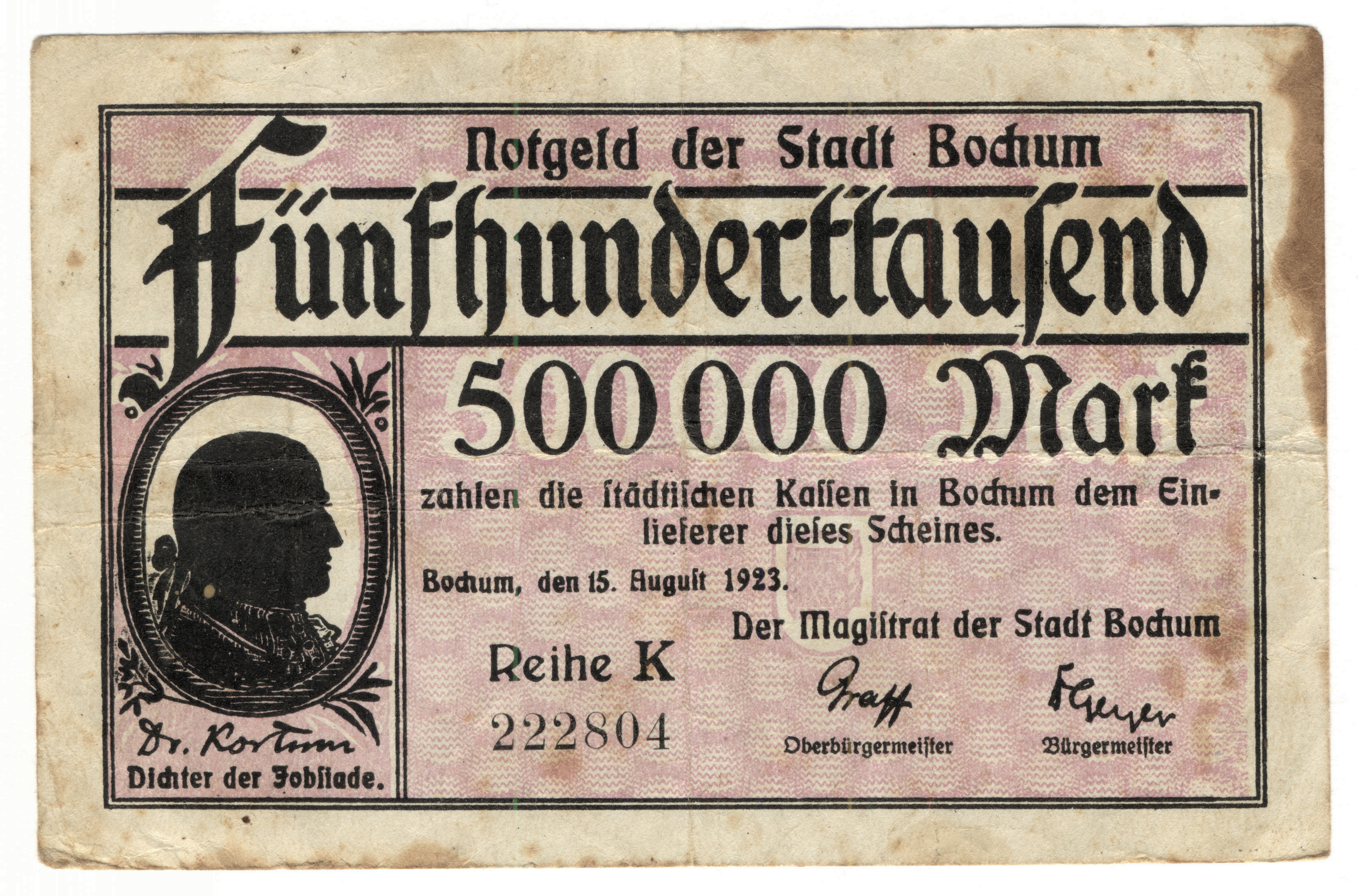
Notgeld (emergency money) of Bochum from 1923

- 1919 – In the aftermath of the January KPD uprising, large-scale socialist uprisings in the Ruhr result in "armed struggles" between miners and the Freikorps.
- 1920 – Ruhr Uprising following the Kapp-Putsch. The general strike called in response to the Putsch leads to a more military struggle involving the Red Ruhr Army. Initially engaged against the Freikorps, latterly they also engage the regular army.
- 1921 – French and Belgian troops occupy Duisburg (and Düsseldorf) on 8 March, in response to Germany defaulting on the reparation payments laid down by the Versailles Conference.
- 1923 – On 10–11 January, the occupation was extended from Duisburg to the rest of the Ruhr (Occupation of the Ruhr). In Duisburg in October, separatists call for independence for the "Rheinische Republik", but by November their efforts are brought to an end by the occupying troops. The financing of the resistance to the Ruhr occupation by the German government of Wilhelm Cuno is one of the reasons for the impending hyperinflation and the Cuno strikes.

The Ruhr industrialist Fritz Thyssen assists the NSDAP with a massive financial sum.

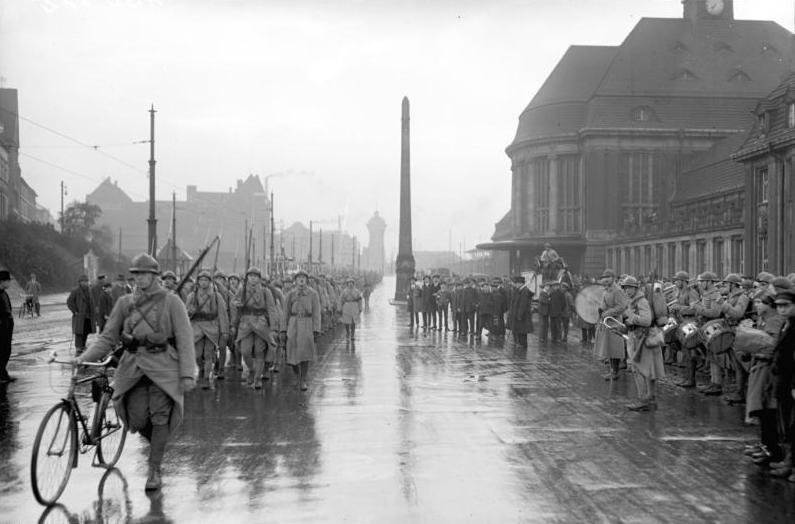
The last French troops leave Dortmund in October 1924.

- 1925 – August/September: Adoption of the Dawes Plan by the German Government. The Allies end the occupation of the Ruhr.
- 1923 – Representatives from the towns of Köln, Düsseldorf und Duisburg found the "Studiengesellschaft für die rheinisch-westfälische Schnellbahn". A Schnellbahn (suburban railway) direct from Köln to Dortmund is planned. The Reichsbahn (National railway system) hinder these plans and intend to extend the current lines and construct their own Schnellbahn system.
- 1923 – The Westfalenhalle is opened in Dortmund. It becomes a location for six-day racing and other large sporting events, as well as political meetings of the Weimar Republic.
- 1925 – On 27 April 1925 Dortmund Airport is opened for business. Dortmund became a stop on the route Copenhagen-Hamburg-Bremen-Dortmund-Frankfurt(M)-Stuttgart-Zürich operated by Deutsche Luft Hansa (this was a different airport than the present-day Dortmund Airport).
- 1926 – Despite having been completed in 1921, the Wedaustadion in Duisburg is officially opened. With a capacity of 40,000 it is the second-largest in Germany after the Grunewaldstadion in Berlin. By 1922 the German Athletics Championships are being staged there. In 1924, Germany lost a football match for the first time on German soil, against Italy in the Wedaustadion, losing 1:0.
- 1928 – Paul Reusch founds the Ruhrlade in January 1928.

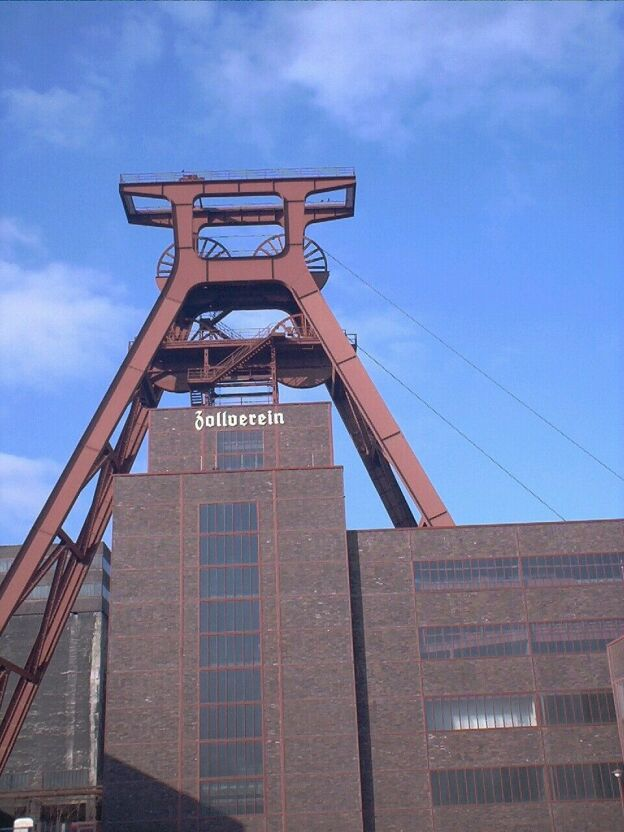
Winding towers, like these of the Zeche Zollverein in 1928, marked the landscape of the Ruhr.

- 1928 – A period of boundary reforms. As a result, the "double-towns" of Gelsenkirchen-Buer and Duisburg-Hamborn were formed. Two years beforehand, this new construction had a precedence in the likes of Castrop-Rauxel and Wanne-Eickel.
- 1928 – During the Ruhreisenstreit (Ruhr Iron Strike) more than 200,000 employees of the iron and steel industry were locked out and had to be helped by the state.
- 1929 – The Volkspark Grugapark is opened as Große Ruhrländische Gartenbau-Ausstellung (Great Ruhr Garden Exhibition).
- 1929 – The Oberhausen Gasometer is completed, the largest gas holder in Europe.
- 1929 – The start of the world economic crisis causes the export-orientiated production of the coal and steel industry to collapse.
- 1932 – The Great Depression reaches its high point. Unemployment in the Ruhr stands 31.2%. Production of iron had reduced by 60%, and it was a similar situation in the steel and coal industries
- 1932 – The industrialist Friedrich Flick manages to sell his interest in Gelsenkirchen Bergwerke to the German government for about three times its market value, an event sometimes known as the Gelsenberg affair.
- 1933 – National Socialist takeover – the Steinwache in Dortmund becomes a prison and torture chamber of the Gestapo.
- 1936 – Jewish business owners were dispossessed, like for example the Gebr. Alsberg.
- 1938 – During Kristallnacht, the synagoges in most Ruhr towns were destroyed, such as the Alte Synagoge in Dortmund. The construction of the Old Synagoge in Essen is so robust that it proves impossible to blow it up without damaging the surrounding buildings – therefore the building remained standing, although its interior was desecrated and burnt out.
- 1938 – In Drewer Mark in Marl, the Chemischen Werke Hüls is founded. It is largely a subsidiary of IG. Farben. During the Third Reich, synthetic rubber, Buna, was produced there for tyres. Slave labor was also used for production.
- 1939 – The Second World War began on 1 September.
- 1943 – Allied Bombing of the Ruhr destroys over 65% of houses in several cities, such as Dortmund and Duisburg. In Essen more than half the houses are destroyed. Thousands of people lose their lives. The centres of towns along the Hellweg zone lie almost completely in rubble.
- 1943 – On 18 May, the Möhne Dam is bombed and breached by 617 Squadron of the Royal Air Force (see Operation Chastise). A flood wave races along the valleys of the Möhne and the Ruhr. Over 1,000 people lose their lives. The town of Neheim-Hüsten (now a part of Arnsberg) is hit hard and the Himmelpforten Monastery is completely swept away. Most of the reported fatalities were foreign forced labourers and prisoners of war. By October the dam had been repaired and general industrial production in the Ruhr had recovered by about the same time. The following year, the Dortmund-Ems canal is breached by 617 Squadron.
- 1943 – During the Tehran Conference, it was already clear enough how important the Allies considered the Ruhr area for the new ordering of Germany after the war. Franklin D. Roosevelt proposed placing the region under international administration, independent of other German states.
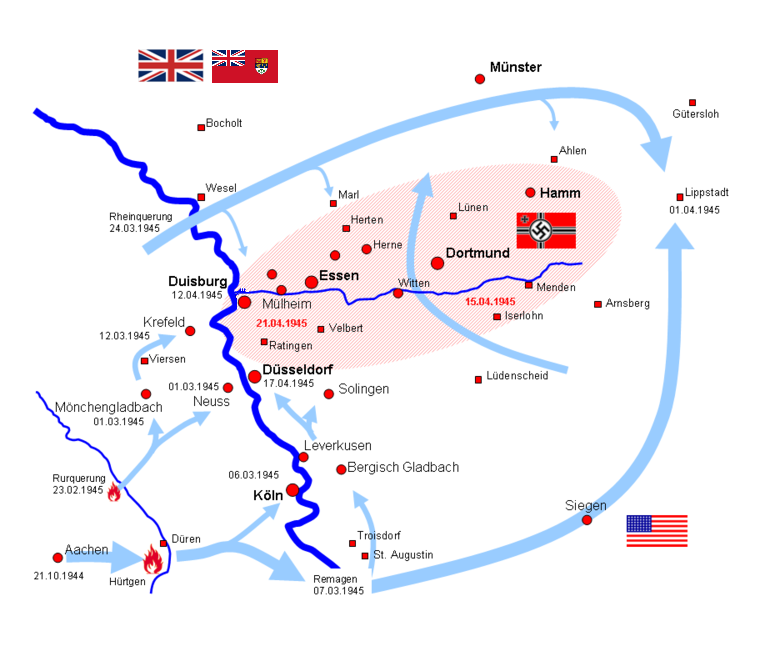
- Ruhr Pocket/Ruhrkessel 1945
  1944 – The Morgenthau-Plan is discussed in the USA. This would have made the Ruhr area an international zone administered by the United Nations, and would have set up separate North German and South German states. Industrial installations were threatened with dismantling as part and parcel of a prohibition on re-industrialization.
- 1945 – The fighting in the Ruhr Pocket/Ruhrkessel results in about 105,000 dead.
- 1945 – On 11 April, the arms manufacturer Alfried Krupp von Bohlen und Halbach was placed under arrest by American troops in the Villa Hügel.
- 1945 – During the Potsdam Conference, Winston Churchill and Joseph Stalin discuss an exchange of Ruhr coal from the British zone of occupation for food from the Soviet Zone. Simultaneously, reparations were determined in the form of industrial equipment from the Ruhr area. Stalin and Truman are agreed that the Ruhr should remain a part of Germany, against the wishes of France who wanted a special state status for the region.

== Second Half of the 20th century (from 1946) ==
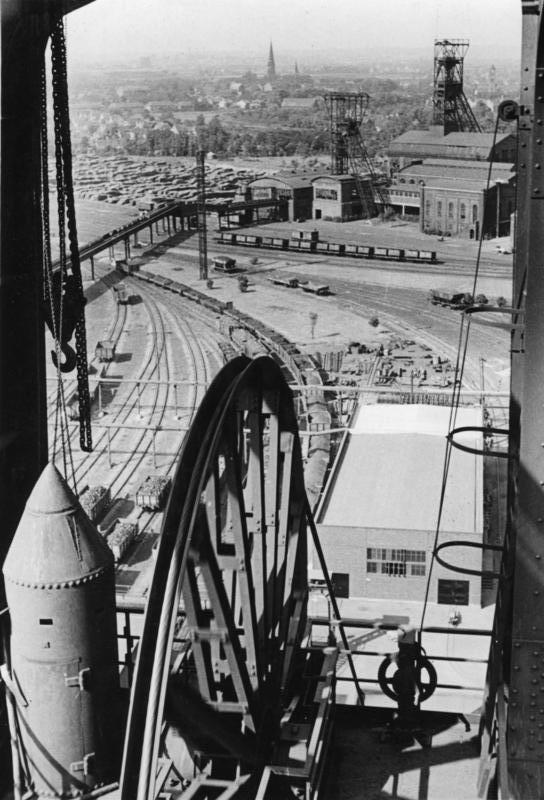
The industries of the Ruhr, essential for the re-construction of post-war Germany, remained under the control of the international Ruhr authority in 1949.

Industry in the district is restored after the war, but by the end of the 20th century the coal and steel industries have declined drastically

- 1946 – Founding of the Land of North Rhine-Westphalia by the British military government, with the entire Ruhr region lying within its boundaries previously France had been pressing for the Ruhr to be detached from Germany (similar to the situation they were able to engineer in the Saarland).
- 1946–1947 – The hunger winter affects the population of the Ruhr area particularly hard. Thousands of town inhabitants undertake Hamsterfahrten (travel to farming regions to barter jewellery and other goods for food) to the farming regions of the uplands.
- 1948 – In January, in the towns of the Ruhr area, the number of strikes is growing and growing – in Essen alone 50,000 workers take action. The workers protest about shortages in the supply of food. Bavaria, especially, refuses to fulfill its obligations to the exchange of goods in the Bizone (i.e. the area covered by the British and American zones).
- 1948 – With the currency reform in June, goods started to become more plentiful again – however households with limited income, for example working-class families, had to bear the burden of the cost of the war via the resulting reduction of the value of money.
- 1949 – The Ruhrstatut of 28 April 1949 regulated the control of the coal and steel production by setting up the International Ruhr Authority to supervise these industries. When state sovereignty is taken on by the Federal Republic in May, industries relevant to the armament industry remain under international control. On 13 June Belgian soldiers went into action against German workers who erected barriers to block the demolition of Hydrierwerk.
- 1952 – The Dortmund Westfalenhalle is re-constructed in its present form, after the destruction of the first in the war. The official opening took place on 2 February in the presence of the President Theodor Heuss.
- 1952 – On the founding of the European Coal and Steel Community on 23 July, the International Ruhr Authority ceases their work. The Coal and Steel Community is the seed of the later European Union.
- 1954 – In Oberhausen the annual short-film festival takes place for the first time.
- 1955 – In Dortmund the oldest (stone) Rathaus in Germany is demolished.
- 1956 – the demand for coal reaches 124,6 million tonnes per year and the number of workers in Ruhr mining reaches its high point at 494,000.
- 1957 – At Bochum Observatory in October, Heinz Kaminski receives radio signals from Sputnik 1, possibly the first outside the Soviet Union to do so.
- 1959 – In Bonn, Bochum miners protest against the import of cheap American coal. The Zechensterben (death of the mines) begins.
- 1962 – Opening of an Opel factory in Bochum.
- 1962 – The writer Max von der Grün publishes his first novel, influenced by the working world of miners of the Ruhr, Männer in zweifacher Nacht.
- 1963 – The Bundesliga (German football league) is inaugurated. It has three clubs from the Ruhr: Schalke 04, Meidericher SV (heute: MSV Duisburg), Borussia Dortmund
- 1964 – The Adolf-Grimme-Preis is awarded for the first time in Marl. The first winner is Günter Gaus.
- 1964 – The Rationalisierungsverband des Steinkohlenbergbaus proposes the closure of 31 large mines employing 64,000 workers. Demonstrations follow.
- 1964 – The Planetarium Bochum is opened. Since then it has been the most modern and largest installation of its type in Germany.
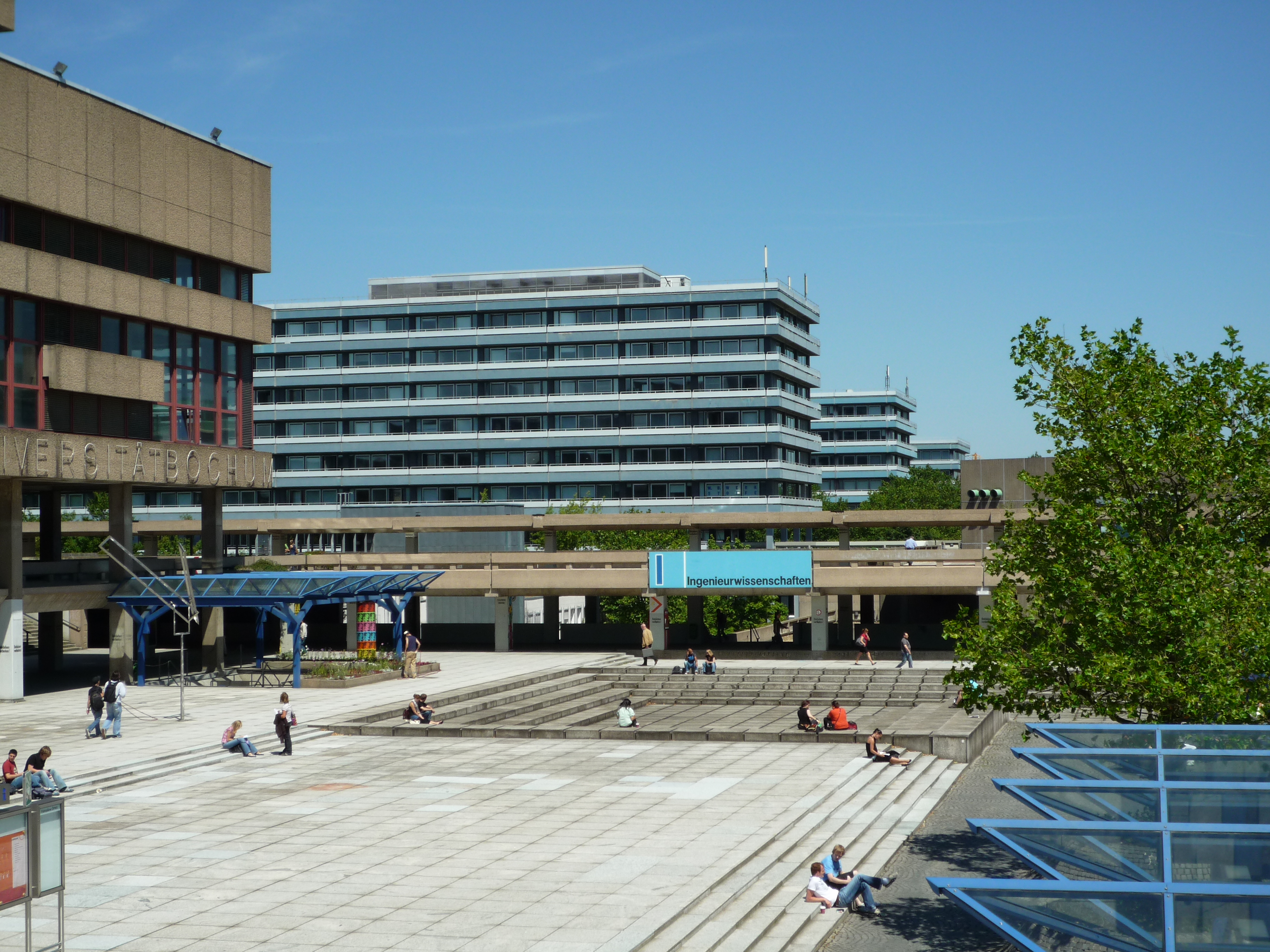
- Ruhr-Universität Bochum
  1965 – The Ruhr University in Bochum is opened, the first University in the Ruhr. Garden show in Gruga in Essen.
- 1966 – On 5 May, Borussia Dortmund win the European Cup Winners Cup by beating Liverpool 2–1 in Glasgow.
- 1966 – The Duisburger Vertrag is concluded on 16 September. It forms an agreement between the Federal Republic of Germany and Bavaria over the financing and execution of the extension to the Rhine–Main–Danube Canal, forming the basis for a through connection between the mouth of the Rhine in Rotterdam and the mouth of the Danube on the Black Sea.
- 1967 – Krupp was converted into a Kapitalgesellschaft.
- 1968 – The University of Dortmund was founded on 16 December.
- 1969 – The Ruhrkohle AG was founded.
- 1969 – The Stadtbahngesellschaft Ruhr, founded on an initiative of the Land of North Rhine-Westphalia takes over the planning of the Stadtbahnnetz Rhine-Ruhr (local railways).
- 1970 – The first Revierpark comes into being in Herne.
- 1972 – The universities of Essen and Duisburg are founded. In 2003, they are fused into the University of Duisburg-Essen.
- 1973 – The Zentralstelle für die Vergabe von Studienplätzen is set up in Dortmund. In Mülheim an der Ruhr, the RheinRuhrZentrum opens, Germany's first undercover shopping centre.
- 1974 – The World Cup in Germany. Games are played in the newly constructed stadiums – Parkstadion in Gelsenkirchen and Westfalenstadion in Dortmund.
- 1975 – Bochum and Duisburg are extended: Bochum incorporates Wattenscheid and Duisburg receives Rheinhausen, Homberg und Walsum. Herne and Wanne-Eickel are united.
- 1977 – The steel crisis signals problems in the industry, problems which started to occur in 1975. Since 1974 the production of steel has sunk from 32,2 million tonnes to 21,5 million tonnes. The crisis affects large parts of the Ruhr. 200,000 jobs are lost.
- 1977 – In the centre of Essen the Straßembahn line between Saalbau and Porscheplatz is transferred underground. The U18 between Mülheim and Essen becomes the first "genuine" Stadtbahn.
- 1979 – The Kommunalverband Ruhrgebiet (KVR) arises from the Siedlungsverband Ruhrkohlenbezirk (SVR).
- 1979 – For the first time in the Ruhr, a Smog alarm is given on 17 January.
- 1980 – The Verkehrsverbund Rhein-Ruhr is founded. In the Haard, the Haltern 1 Shaft is dug. The Old Synagogue in Essen becomes a memorial.

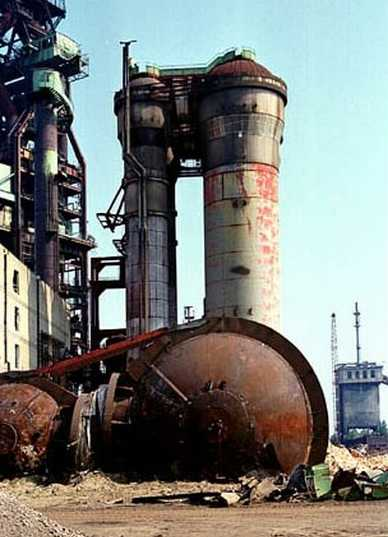
Sign of economic change: in 1983, in spite of seemingly successful protests by employees, steel production at the Krupp works in Duisburg-Rheinhausen were shut down.

- 1981 – First Tatort TV programme with Horst Schimanski, commissar with the Duisburg Police, provokes protests in Duisburg.
- 1982 – Area wide protests by steelworkers against closures and lay-offs in the Ruhr. Krupp shut down the rolling mill in Duisburg-Rheinhausen. The last blast-furnace between Duisburg and Dortmund is closed down in Gelsenkirchen.
- 1983 – Proposal for a new structuring of the German steel industry. The last piece of the S-Bahn connecting Düsseldorf with Dortmund, between Bochum and Dortmund, is completed.
- 1984 – In Dortmund the first U-Bahn line is opened.
- 1985 – In the western part of the Ruhr, a highest-level smog warning level is issued in January. North Rhine-Westphalia at this time had the highest levels of smog in Germany.
- 1985 – Günter Wallraff's book Ganz unten is published.
- 1986 – In May, there is a serious accident at the Hamm-Uentrop atomic power station and a radio-active cloud hangs over Hamm and over the Ruhr. The operators attempt to hush the incident up. In Essen they became aware of the increased radiation as they had been taking regular measurements ever since the Chernobyl disaster.
- 1988 – The Initiativkreis Ruhrgebiet is founded.
- 1989 – The Internationale Bauausstellung Emscher Park begins its work.
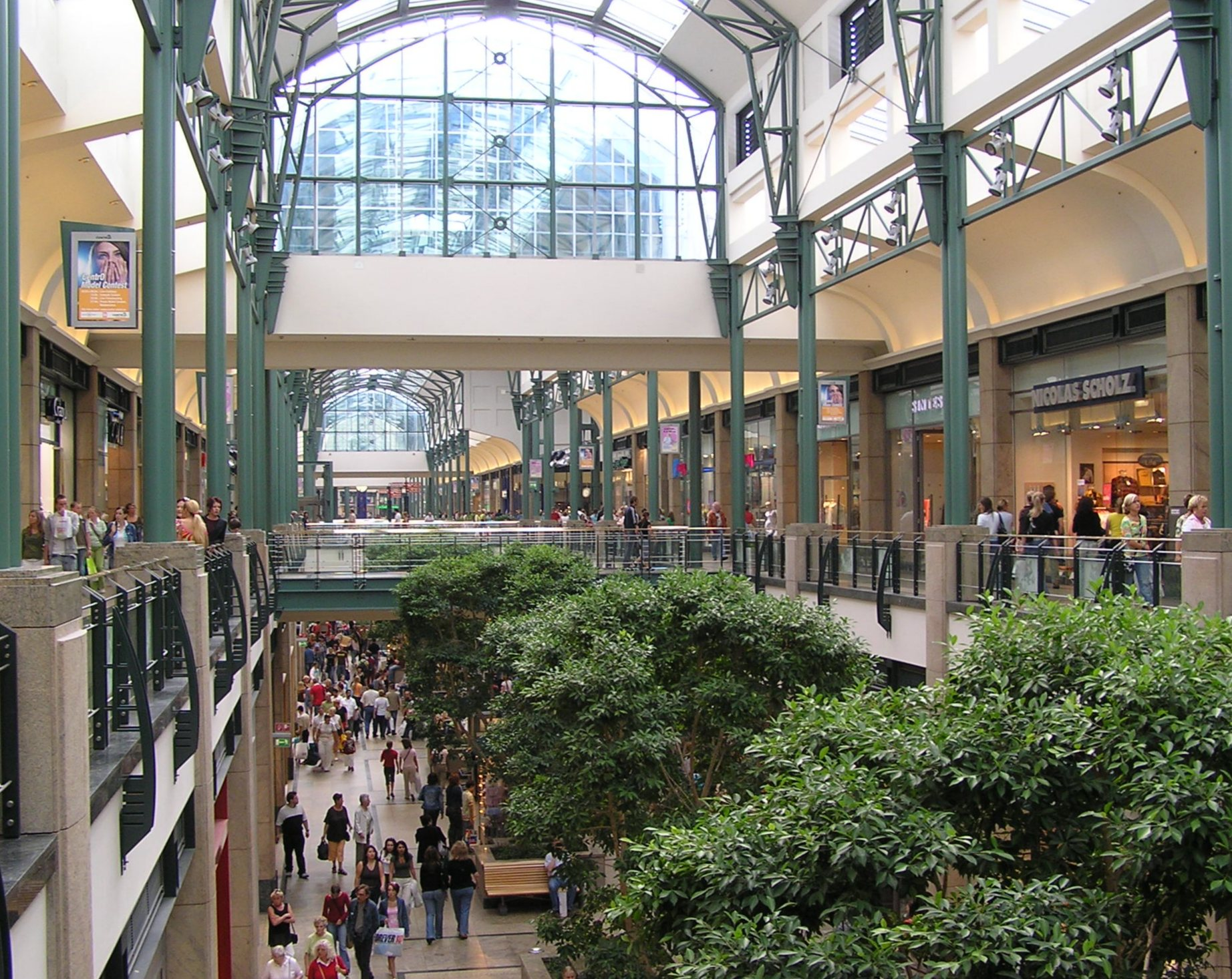
- Result of economic change: the shopping centre, CentrO, in Oberhausen stands on the grounds of a former iron works.
  1992 – In December, the Kokerei Kaiserstuhl in Dortmund starts business as one of the most modern Kokerei in Europe. The installation will only operate for eight years.
- 1993 – The first Mayday takes place in the Westfalenhalle. It is the largest indoor rave in Germany and until today a part of the Techno culture.
- 1994 – In December an EU-Summit is held in Essen, in the Grugahalle. The most important themes for the Council of the European Union are suggestions for fighting unemployment and for the promotion of equality of opportunity in the European Union.
- 1995 – The Ruhr becomes a part of the newly defined European metropolitan area Rhine-Ruhr.
- 1995 – The last base of the British Army of the Rhine in the Ruhr, Suffolk Barracks in Dortmund, closes on 17 November.
- 1996 – On 11 September, the CentrO shopping centre in Oberhausen is opened. It is the core of the Neue Mitte, built on the grounds of the former Gutehoffnungshütte and a visible sign of economic change in the Ruhr.
- 1997 – As part of the Bundesgartenschau in Gelsenkirchen, the grounds of the former Nordstern Mine is converted into the Landschaftspark Nordsternpark.
- 1999 – Final stages of the IBA Emscher Park – portraying new uses for the Inner Harbour in Duisburg.

== 21st century ==
- 2004 – The Kommunalverband Ruhrgebiet (KVR) is replaced by the Regionalverband Ruhr (RVR). On the insistence of the towns of the Reich district, this body has extended rights and has now, for example, authority over so-called master-plans such as the conversion of the Emscher system to an underground Emscherkanal.
- 2004 – Adam Opel AG plans to lose several thousand jobs in Bochum. A wildcat strike, unauthorized by IG Metall and against their own Betriebsrat brings European production to a standstill. On 19 October, 25,000 people gathered on the Platz am Schauspielhaus as a spontaneous display of solidarity.
- 2005 – The introduction of Hartz IV. Almost a million people in the Ruhr are affected.
- 2005 – The formation of a Regionalpräsidiums Ruhrgebiet is announced by the parties in the North Rhine-Westphalian government.
- 2005 – In Duisburg and its neighbours of Mülheim an der Ruhr, Oberhausen und Bottrop, the 7th World Games took place.
- 2006 – Essen is chosen as the European City of Culture 2010. Dortmund and Gelsenkirchen stage games during the World Cup.
- 2007 – In January, the Federal Government announced the intention to subsidize the German coal industry until 2018. The Land government announce that aid from them will cease in 2015.
- 2007 – In August the Loveparade takes place in. The first staging of the event since its move from Berlin to the Ruhr carries the motto Love Is Everywhere.
- 2008 – The Nokia factory in Bochum is closed.
- 2008 – The Loveparade is celebrated in Dortmund with 1.6 million participants – a record.
- 2008 – Foundation of the Ruhr University Hospitals in Bochum and metropolitan area.
- 2009 – Opel is in crisis following the insolvency of General Motors.
- 2010 – Essen and the rest of the Ruhr stage RUHR.2010 – Kulturhauptstadt Europas.

== See also ==
- History of Westphalia
- Ruhr Mining
- Ruhr Shipping
- List of Mines in North Rhine-Westphalia
- Histories of individual Ruhr towns/cities: Bochum, Bottrop, Dortmund, Duisburg, Essen, Gelsenkirchen, Hagen, Hamm, Hattingen, Herne, Kamen, Mülheim an der Ruhr, Oberhausen, Recklinghausen, Unna und Wesel.
- Timeline of Essen history

== Bibliography for References ==
- Menne, Bernhard, Blood and Steel – The Rise of the Krupps (2008) ISBN 1-4437-2852-7
- Parent, Thomas, Das Ruhrgebiet, Kultur und Geschichte in >Revier< zwischen Ruhr und Lippe (1984) ISBN 3-7701-1368-3

== Literature ==
- Dietmar Bleidick/Manfred Rasch (ed.): Technikgeschichte im Ruhrgebiet. Technikgeschichte für das Ruhrgebiet. (Technological History of the Ruhr District) Klartext Verlag, Essen; 2004; ISBN 3-89861-376-3
- Ernst Dossmann: Auf den Spuren der Grafen von der Mark. Wissenswertes über das Werden und Wachsen der ehemaligen Grafschaft Mark und über den Märkischen Kreis; (On the Trail of the Grafs of the Mark) Verlag Mönnig Iserlohn; 1983; ISBN 3-922885-14-4
- Doris Freer (concept); Stadt Duisburg, Frauenbüro (Hrsg.): Von Griet zu Emma. Beiträge zur Geschichte von Frauen in Duisburg vom Mittelalter bis heute. 2. (Contributions to History from Duisburg Females, from the Middle Ages to the Present) Duisburger Frauengeschichtsbuch, Duisburg 2000. (pdf Teil 1 (1 Mb); pdf Teil 2 (3,25 Mb))
- Jan Gerchow: Haus, Stand und Amt. Die Gesellschaft des Ruhrgebiets vor der Industrie (Society of the Ruhr District before Industrialization), in: Die Erfindung des Ruhrgebiets. Arbeit und Alltag um 1900. Katalog zur sozialhistorischen Dauerausstellung, Ruhrlandmuseum Essen, hrsg. von Michael Zimmermann u.a., Essen-Bottrop 2000, S. 31–46, ISBN 3-89355-211-1
- Roland Günter: Im Tal der Könige: ein Reisebuch zu Emscher, Rhein und Ruhr (A Travel Guide to the Emscher, Rhine and Ruhr), Essen; 1994; ISBN 3-88474-044-X
- Bodo Harenberg (ed.): Chronik des Ruhrgebiets. Dortmund: WAZ-Buch Chronik Verlag, 1987. ISBN 3-88379-089-3 (mit 155 Kalendarien, 1.693 Einzelartikeln, 1.759 überwiegend farbigen Abbildungen, 19 Übersichtsartikeln, Tabellen- und Statistik-Anhang sowie Personen- und Sachregister)
- Wilhelm Hermann, Gertrude Hermann; Die alten Zechen an der Ruhr (The Old Mines on the Ruhr); 2003; ISBN 3-7845-6992-7
- Joachim Huske: Die Steinkohlenzechen im Ruhrrevier. Daten und Fakten von den Anfängen bis 1997, Bochum 1998, ISBN 3-921533-62-7
- Hetty Kemmerich: Sagt, was ich gestehen soll! Hexenprozesse – Entstehung-Schicksale-Chronik!, Dortmund: Lessing, 2003, ISBN 3-929931-17-6
- Egon Erwin Kisch: Stahlwerk in Bochum, vom Hochofen aus gesehen / Das Nest der Kanonenkönige: Essen; zwei Reportagen; in: Der rasende Reporter, Berlin 1924; Aufbau-Verlag 2001, ISBN 3-7466-5051-8
- Ruth Kersting, Lore Ponthöfer: Seydlitz / Gymnasiale Oberstufe / Wirtschaftsraum Ruhrgebiet. Berlin: Cornelsen Schroedel, 1990
- Wolfgang Köllmann u.a.: Das Ruhrgebiet im Industriezeitalter. Geschichte und Entwicklung, 2 Bde., Patmos Verlag, Düsseldorf 1990. ISBN 3-491-33206-0
- Harald Polenz; Von Grafen, Bischöfen und feigen Morden; Klartext-Verlag, Essen; 2004; ISBN 3-89861-260-0
- Andreas Schlieper: 150 Jahre Ruhrgebiet. Ein Kapitel deutscher Wirtschaftsgeschichte. Düsseldorf, 1986. ISBN 3-590-18150-8
- Ferdinand Seibt (ed.): Vergessene Zeiten, Mittelalter im Ruhrgebiet, Ausstellungskatalog, 2 Bünde, Essen; 1990, ISBN 3-89355-052-6
- Gregor Spohr, Wolfgang Schulze; Schöne Schlösser und Burgen: der Revier-Freizeitführer; Pomp, Bottrop; 1996; ISBN 3-89355-133-6
- Diederich von Steinen: Westphälische Geschichte, 1757
- Albert K. Hömberg: Geschichtliche Nachrichten über Adelssitze und Rittergüter im Herzogtum Westfalen und ihre Besitzer. aus dem Nachlass veröffentlicht, Münster / Westf. 1969–1979, 20 Hefte (Veröffentlichungen der Hist. Komm. Westfalens, Bd. 33)
- Friedrich Keinemann: Soziale und politische Geschichte des westfälischen Adels 1815–1945, Hamm 1976
- Paul Kanold [et al.]: Grundlagen für die Neuregelung der kommunalen Grenzen im Ruhrgebiet, Berlin 1928
- Die kommunale Neugliederung im Ruhrgebiet als Etappe zur diktatorischen großpreußischen Zentralisation, Schriften der Reichsarbeitsgemeinschaft deutscher Föderalisten, Köln 1929
- Gustav Adolf Wüstenfeld: Auf den Spuren des Kohlenbergbaus : Bilder u. Dokumente zur Geschichte d. Ruhrbergbaus im 18. u. 19. Jh., Wetter-Wengern : Wüstenfeld, 1985, ISBN 3-922014-04-6
- ders.: Frühe Stätten des Ruhrbergbaues, Wetter-Wengern : Wüstenfeld, 1975
