= Guido Benno Feige =

German lichenologist (1937–2007)

- Born: 19 October 1937; Salzwedel, Sachsen-Anhalt, Prussia
- Died: 11 June 2007 (aged 69); Essen
- Scientific career
- Fields: Lichenology
- Author abbrev. (botany): Feige

Guido Benno Feige (19 October 1937 – 11 June 2007) was a German lichenologist and botanist known for his contributions to lichen secondary chemistry, taxonomy, and floristics. He was a highly regarded educator and researcher, with a legacy that includes the foundation of a botanical garden and a lichen herbarium. In honour of his academic excellence and contributions to the field of lichenology, a new genus and two species were named after him.

== Early life and education ==
Feige was born in Salzwedel, Saxony-Anhalt, in the former Prussian province of Saxony in 1937. He commenced his university studies in chemistry at Jena in the former GDR in 1956, before escaping to West Germany in 1958 to continue his education at the University of Würzburg, where he studied chemistry, biology, and geography. Feige earned his doctorate from the same university in 1967, with a thesis focused on the physiology of symbiotic partners in lichens; it was titled Untersuchungen zum Kohlenstoff- und Phosphatstoffwechsel der Flechten unter Verwendung radioaktiver Isotope ("Investigations on the carbon and phosphate metabolism of lichens using radioactive isotopes"). He then joined the University of Cologne in 1970 as a research assistant, where he further developed his expertise in lichen physiology and achieved his habilitation.

== Career ==
Following his time in Cologne, Feige was appointed the chair of botany at the University of Essen in 1980, a position he held for 23 years until his retirement in 2003. His tenure at Essen saw the development of the plant physiology department into a broader botany department, which fostered research in diverse fields such as tree physiology, floristics, lichen taxonomy, and biogeography.

Feige's research primarily revolved around lichens, with particular emphasis on the physiology of symbiotic partners and secondary chemistry. He was instrumental in establishing standardised high-performance liquid chromatography (HPLC) methods for the identification of lichen metabolites. Feige's taxonomic studies spanned several families of macrolichens, and later in his career, he developed an interest in phytopathogenic fungi and their biogeography.

Feige was a prolific author, with over 130 original papers mostly on lichens, and a popular guide to lichen biology in German. Together with colleague H. Thorsten Lumbsch he published two exsiccatae (collections of dried specimens), one on the Umbilicariaceae, and the other on Lecanoroid lichens. He also contributed chapters to several books. Despite his retirement in 2003, Feige continued his research at the university, driven by his passion for lichenology.

== Recognition ==
In acknowledgment of his outstanding contributions to the field, Feige was honoured as an Honorary Member of the Japanese Society for Lichenology. Moreover, his name has been perpetuated in the naming of a genus, Feigeana, and two lichen species, Pseudocercospora feigeana and Ocellularia feigei, which highlight the impact of his work on lichen taxonomy. To celebrate his retirement, his colleagues and former students contributed to a Festschrift, a volume of articles, dedicated to him in 2003. This volume, published on the occasion of his 65th birthday, includes 42 articles by 73 friends and colleagues from 19 countries.

== Personal life and character ==
As a person, Feige was a vibrant character who loved life. He had a profound love for music and was known for playing the organ at his church and for collecting organ memorabilia. He was an accomplished musician who enjoyed entertaining guests at dinner parties, often playing pieces from opera overtures on his piano. His passion for music also extended to playing the organ at his church. In addition to music, he had a keen interest in good food, wine, and socialising. Those who knew him highlighted his humour and the enthusiasm he brought to life. Feige was also an avid collector, with a special interest in lichens and organ memorabilia. In addition to his many interests and activities, religion was a significant source of strength and motivation.

Feige was married to Ilse, with whom he had four children: two sons, and two daughters. Feige was plagued by a long and severe illness towards the end of his life, which eventually led to his death in Essen on 11 June 2007.

== Legacy ==
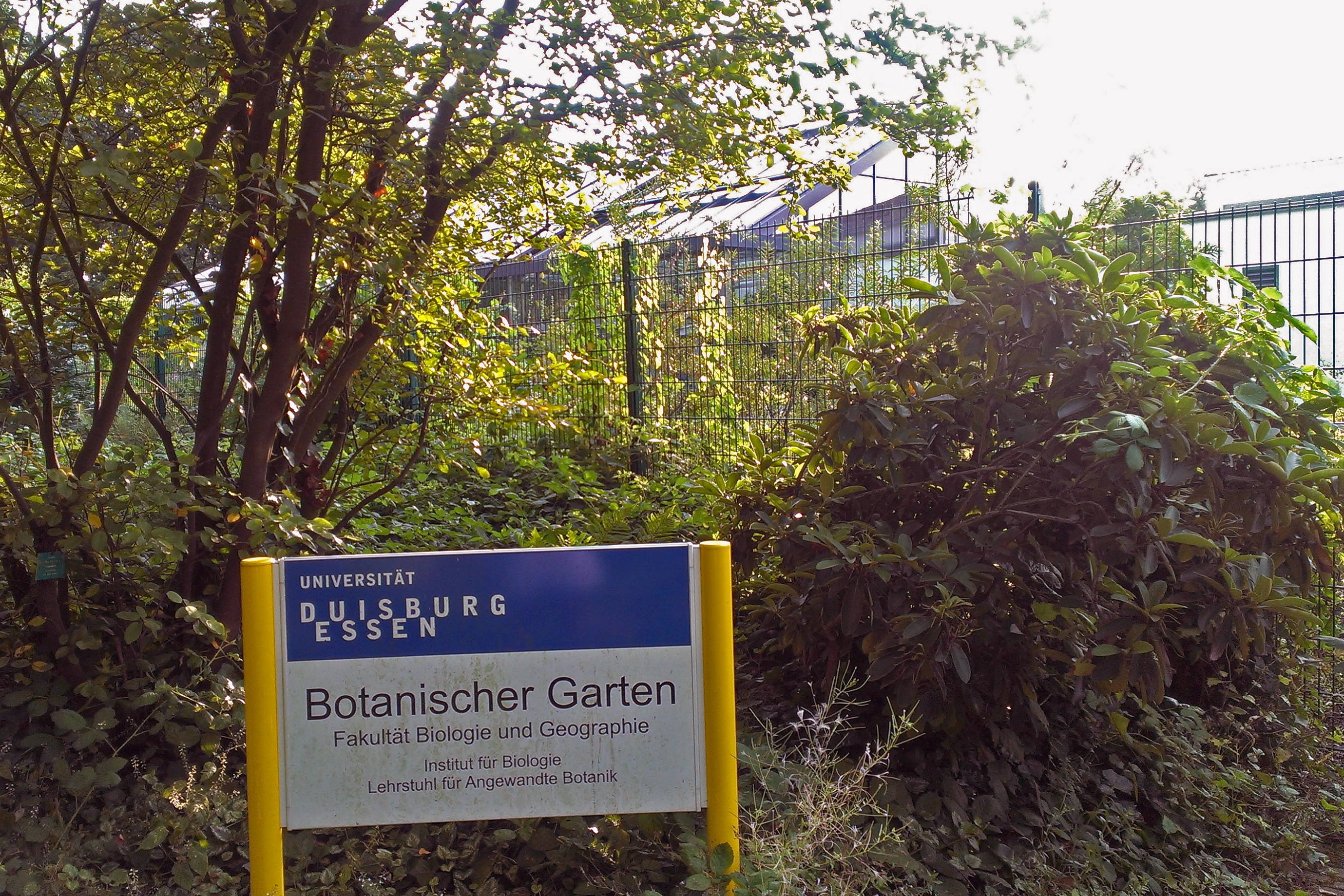
Feige established the Botanical Garden of the University of Duisburg-Essen in the 1980s.

Guido Benno Feige's legacy is firmly rooted in his pedagogic and scientific activities. His contributions have significantly advanced the field of lichenology. He established a lichen herbarium now housed in Halle with more than 25,000 of his own specimens, and a botanical garden in Essen. His students remember him fondly for his dynamic teaching style and for the freedom he gave them to develop their research programmes. The standardisation of methodologies for the HPLC analysis of lichens, developed under his guidance, remains a vital tool in lichen research. Feige's botanical garden, particularly the comprehensive collection of the genus Aeonium (Crassulaceae), and the extensive herbarium at the University of Halle are testaments to his life's work.

The scientific community remembers him not only for his academic achievements but also for his love of teaching, his charismatic character, and his contagious passion for nature and plants.

== Selected publications ==
- Feige, Guido Benno (1979). "Problems of lichen physiology". Nova Hedwigia. 30 (1–4). Schweizerbart: 725–774. doi:10.1127/nova.hedwigia/30/1979/725.
- Straek, Dieter; Feige, Guido Benno; Kroll, Reinhard (1979). "Screening of Aromatic Secondary Lichen Substances by High Performance Liquid Chromatography". Zeitschrift für Naturforschung C. 34 (9–10): 695–698. doi:10.1515/znc-1979-9-1007.
- Feige, G.B.; Posner, B.; Geyer, M. (1987). "On the chemotaxonomy of Umbilicaria sect. Anthracinae". Herzogia. 7 (3–4): 649–674. doi:10.1127/herzogia/7/1987/649.
- Feige, Guido B. (1998). Etymologie der wissenschaftlichen Gattungsnamen der Flechten [Etymology of the scientific generic names of lichens]. Botanisches Institut und Botanischer Garten der Universität Essen-Gesamthochschule.
- Schmidt, Joachim; Kricke, Randolph; Feige, Guido Benno (2001). "Measurements of bark pH with a modified flathead electrode". The Lichenologist. 33 (5): 456–460. doi:10.1006/lich.2001.0341.
- Tehler, A.; Dahlkild, Å.; Eldenäs, P.; Feige, G.B. (2004). "The phylogeny and taxonomy of Macaronesian, European and Mediterranean Roccella (Roccellaceae, Arthoniales)". Symbolae Botanicae Upsalienses. 34 (1): 405–428.
