= Access mat =

An access mat is a portable platform used to support equipment used in construction and other resource-based activities, including drilling rigs, camps, tanks, and helipads. It may also be used as a structural roadway to provide passage over unstable ground, pipelines and more.

Depending on its application, an access mat may be called a rig mat, swamp mat, industrial mat, ground protection mat, road mat, construction mat, mud mat, mobile mat, safety mat, or portable roadway. Because there is no body governing or standardizing terminology (nor design and construction), and terminology inconsistencies are compounded by regional and industry-specific vernacular, the types described below should be considered a general guide to access matting.

== Types ==
There are three general categories that describe access matting:

=== Construction Mats ===
Construction mats are used to provide relatively clean, smooth, all-weather working, walking and driving surfaces in industrial or commercial construction settings where access would not otherwise be guaranteed. This category of mat reduces crew downtime, increasing the likelihood of timely task completion. Construction mats have multiple applications, including:

- Oil and Gas sector: temporary roads, platforming on leases, pipeline terminals, and facilities
- Power lines: tower erection
- Electrical sub-stations
- Construction of buildings and warehouses
- Residential housing projects (especially where local bylaws penalize depositing mud and dirt in situations where it may wash into storm drains)

A subset of construction mat, pipeline mats, may be considered construction mats, though they often begin as a different type of access mat. Pipeline mats are typically mats at the end of their productive lives, used as a rough, one-time access setting.

=== Access Mats ===
Access mats are a category of matting that are generally used to provide temporary roads and worksites. Access mats are often used to access work sites in remote or environmentally sensitive areas, such as bogs, wetlands or fens. For that reason, they are often referred to as swamp, bog or wetland mats.

Swamp mats are based on a design developed by Joe Penland in the late 20th century and consist of three layers of 2’ x 8’ lumber laminated together with steel bolts. Most commonly, the top and bottom layer are made up of 11 pieces and the middle layer, placed cross wise, is made from 21 pieces. In the USA, the majority of swamp mats are made from mixed hardwoods, although they are often referred to as oak. It is also usual to find hardwood mats in Canada, however the availability of durable coniferous species such as various firs, pines, and spruces make their use a more economical prospect. Common dimensions are 8' x 14' and 8' x 16'. Thicknesses vary between suppliers from 4.5” to a full 6”. Swamp mats are produced by many small and medium-sized manufacturers, and quality varies dramatically within the industry.

Rig mats, another variety of access mats, may also known as wood and steel mats or steel frame mats. These mats are commonly made of spruce, pine, fir or a combination thereof encased in a steel frame, though some suppliers also offer bamboo and fibreglass options. The frame is normally I Beam or HST steel. The steel is used to strengthen the mats, enabling the manufacturers of the mats to build them in larger sizes and to support more weight compared to all other types of mats. Common sizes are 8' x 20', 8' x 30', and 8' x 40'. One great advantage is the ease of repairing the wooden inserts which gives new life to an already long lasting and durable mat. This method of repair can be completed on both I Beam and HST style mats.

Mud mats are a combination of a reinforced member (such as metal bars or bamboo) confining geosynthetic fabric in a portable mat, that can be rolled up for ease of transport and deployment. A lightweight, light-duty flexible mat suitable for distributing loads over firm ground to avoid rutting. They are not commonly used for access matting in soft ground conditions.

=== Heavy-Equipment Mats ===
The final category of matting is known as Heavy-Equipment matting. These mats are constructed from the most durable, load-bearing materials, designed to be transited by heavy equipment.

One variety of heavy-equipment mat is the Crane mat. Designed for exceptionally heavy use, Crane mats (also known as digging mats, logging mats, or bridge mats) can be used in a wide variety of applications, including:

- Powerline tower assembly
- Mining and heavy access roads
- Module yards, pipe yards, tank farms and staging areas
- Wind farms
- Solar farms
- Bridge repair and construction
- Piers and wharves
- Aviation and Military Applications

Crane mats are constructed of solid 8”, 10” or 12” timbers and are affixed by steel bolts, providing ground stabilization under extreme weight. The timber species used in these mats is generally Douglas fir and Hemlock as this species of wood has superior strength, durability and resiliency characteristics compared to other western softwood. The construction process of these mats allows for versatility as different size, length and quantity of timbers can be used to make different dimension mats. Most crane mat manufacturers are in the Western states and provinces. Repurposing a Crane mat with cable loops allows them to be relocated on site by client-owned equipment, allowing a client to minimize the number of mats they require. This repurposing transforms a Crane mat into a Digging mat.

Logging mats are Crane mats with a reinforced slot which allows knuckle boom loaders or skid-steer loaders to move the mats with ease. Oilfield Mat Combos are heavy-duty steel frame mats designed to provide spill containment and platform matting.

== Construction materials ==
Depending on purpose, mats may be constructed of any of the following materials:

=== Wood ===
Wood is the most commonly used matting material used. Wooden mats range widely in cost, depending on the type of wood used, and may be constructed of:

- Hardwood: hardwood is an imprecise term used in the matting industry, though it generally refers to any wood with a Janka Hardness Test rating at or above red oak.
- Oak
- Fir
- Hybrid or SPF: in essence is a Fir mat with outside edge boards made of Oak. Oak boards are there to mitigate outer edge damages from the grapple used to place mats, as oak is much harder than fir. These mats are also low-cost, primarily used for leveling under drilling rigs, camps and tank farms.
- Spruce: spruce is often used as a “throw away” (one-time use) mat. It’s an inexpensive material with low load bearing capacity, durability and lifespan compared to fir and hardwood access mats.
- Bamboo: bamboo mats are a composite of glue-laminated bamboo strips, offering higher tensile strength than steel.

=== Composite ===
composite mats are constructed of multiple materials, to improve the strength or durability of the mat. They can be more expensive upfront, but as they have a much longer lifespan than wooden mats they can be more cost-efficient. Higher quality versions of the composite mat will include anti-static and/or UV protection additives to prevent the formation of sparks from static electricity and to prevent cracking, physical breakdown & fading of the mat. Composite mats can be non-permeable and sealed in design which prevents contamination or the carry of invasive species. Composite mats feature a variety of connection mechanisms, from complicated systems that use small parts and specialized tools to large aluminum cam lock systems.

Composite mats range in size from 4’ x 4’ to 8’ x 14’. It is commonly thought that bigger is better with access mats, but it is important that the mats can be shipped by standard means. 7.5’ x 14’ composite mats, for example, will fit into an ISO container.

Examples of composite materials used in access matting include:

==== Fibreglass ====
Fibreglass offers high strength, long-term durability and is light weight.

==== Rubber ====
Rubber mats evolved by industries seeking sustainable products made from recycled materials. The rubber crumb recycled from scrap tires is a primary petroleum based material.

Depending on the site soil conditions, there are various thicknesses of mats that can be manufactured. The base material of the rubber mat is crumb rubber, urethane, and fibre from recycled motor vehicle tires. The production of one typical mat uses up to 350 tires which makes the product environmentally friendly. The mats are moulded into conventional 8’x14’ sections and the body has an embedded patented rigid spine which makes each mat extremely durable and virtually indestructible. The surface is textured and designed to provide excellent traction for all types of traffic and have been proven to be a viable and economical solution for long term use under some of the most unruly site conditions and usages across North America. They are effective when used as access roads, heli-pads, laydown areas, wash pads or sidewalks.

Rubber mats are also known as blast mats in the mining industry.

==== Plastic (HDPE) ====
Engineered, hollow rig matting systems may be made up of High-Density Polyethylene (HDPE). When compared to traditional wooden matting, composite mats are lighter in weight yet still can handle heavy loads.

==== Plastic (UHMWPE) ====
This solid plastic, UHMWPE (Ultra-High Molecular Weight Polyethylene), offers the highest impact strength while being highly resistant to corrosive chemicals.

Solid, one-piece compression moulded mats are made from recycled or virgin (HDPE) as well as recycled or virgin Ultra High Molecular Weight Polyethylene (UHMWPE).

Solid mats are lighter in weight than hollow mats but due to the simpler connection system provide the same or similar usable working surface area per mat once connected (10’ x 8’, 13.5’ x 6.5’). Typically this means that a significantly greater number of solid mats can be loaded onto a truck resulting in a number of key benefits including larger working surface area per truckload, reduced number of transport trips per project, reduced fuel consumption and greenhouse gas emissions per project, and reduced transport costs per project.

A simple connection system, using standard connectors and tools, is used which means that mats can easily be installed and connected on undulating as well as flat surfaces, avoiding the need to prepare the ground surface in advance of installation. This also results in project time and cost-savings. Unlike hollow mats, solid mats cannot be punctured and therefore do not take on water (which can increase mat weight) or other fluids (such as fuel or chemicals) that could have an adverse environmental impact on sensitive sites.

== Uses ==
Access matting has a variety of industrial and commercial uses, ranging from temporary, one-time use (for example, in the construction of pipeline access, where the mats are essentially destroyed in the process), reused over multiple projects over multiple seasons, or semi-permanent.

Access mats may also be used in other, non-traditional settings, such as providing access for cattle to water troughs where muddy conditions may prove detrimental to the livestock; for home owners who need access to buildings under construction before driveways are poured; to create temporary parking; or to provide nature enthusiasts with a low-impact, environmental trailway.

== Installation and Removal ==
In some jurisdictions, access mats must be removed when they are no longer needed due to climatic conditions. Most access mat providers contract to remove used mats, which may then be re-rented, stored, or destroyed, depending on condition. Destruction of mats includes chipping/mulching, chipping and burying in approved locations, or chipping and incinerating.
