= Shell pavement design method =

Asphalt roads designing method

The Shell pavement design method was used in many countries for the design of new pavements made of asphalt. First published in 1963, it was the first mechanistic design method, providing a procedure that was no longer based on codification of historic experience but instead that permitted computation of strain levels at key positions in the pavement. By analyzing different proposed constructions (layer materials and thicknesses), the procedure allowed a designer to keep the tensile strain at the bottom of the asphalt at a level less than a critical value and to keep the vertical strain at the top of the subgrade less than another critical value. With these two strains kept, respectively, within the design limits, premature fatigue failure in the asphalt and rutting of the pavement would be precluded. Relationships linking strain values to fatigue and rutting permitted a user to design a pavement able to carry almost any desired number of transits of standard wheel loads.

In such structural road design, the main inputs consist of soil parameters, parameters (thickness and stiffness) for the other road foundation materials, and the expected number of times a standard load will pass over. The output of the calculation is the thickness of the asphalt layer.

Originally published for highway design, it was expanded to include a procedure for airfields in the early 1970s. New criteria were added in 1978.

The approach put forward in the shell pavement design method formed the basis for most early mechanistic structural road design methods, while the AASHTO Mechanistic Empirical Design Guide (the 'MEPDG'), first published in 2004, is, in effect, a modern successor.

== See also ==
- Road surface
