= Feigeana =

Scientific classification
- Domain: Eukaryota
- Kingdom: Fungi
- Division: Ascomycota
- Class: Arthoniomycetes
- Order: Arthoniales
- Family: Roccellaceae
- Genus: Feigeana; Mies, Lumbsch & Tehler (1995)

Type species
- Feigeana socotrana Mies, Lumbsch & Tehler (1995)

Genus of fungi

Feigeana is a genus of lichenized fungi in the family Roccellaceae. A monotypic genus, it contains the single species Feigeana socotrana, first reported from Yemen in 1995.

The genus name of Feigeana is in honour of Guido Benno Feige (1937 - 2007), a German botanist (Lichenology and Mycology) and also Professor of Botany in Essen. He also established the Botanical Garden of the University of Duisburg-Essen.

The genus was circumscribed by Bruno A. Mies, Helge Thorsten Lumbsch and Anders Gunnar Tehler in Mycotaxon Vol.54 on page 156 in 1995.
