= Yankuang Group =

Chinese coal mining state-owned enterprise

Yankuang Group Company Limited 兖矿集团有限公司
- Type: State-owned enterprise
- Industry: Coal mining
- Founded: 1976
- Defunct: 2020
- Headquarters: Jining, Shandong, People's Republic of China
- Area served: People's Republic of China
- Key people: Chairman and Party secretary: Mr. Geng Jiahuai
- Products: Coal
- Services: Coal production
- Revenue: 257,227,610,000 renminbi (2018)
- Subsidiaries: Yanzhou Coal Mining Company Limited
- Website: Yankuang Group Company Limited

Yankuang Group Company Limited, restructured from Yanzhou Mining Bureau, was established in 1976. It is the fourth largest coal mining state-owned enterprise in People's Republic of China. In 1999, Yanzhou Mining Bureau was renamed to Yankuang Group Company Limited. It is not only engaged in coal production and sales, coal chemicals, civil engineering, machinery manufacturing, transportation and electricity, but also garment business and trade. Its headquarters is located at Jining, Shandong.

Its subsidiary company, Yanzhou Coal Mining Company Limited, is listed on New York Stock Exchange, Hong Kong Stock Exchange and Shanghai Stock Exchange respectively in 1998.
