= Botanischer Garten Grugapark =

Botanical garden in Essen, Germany

Coordinates: 51.4281°N 6.9876°E

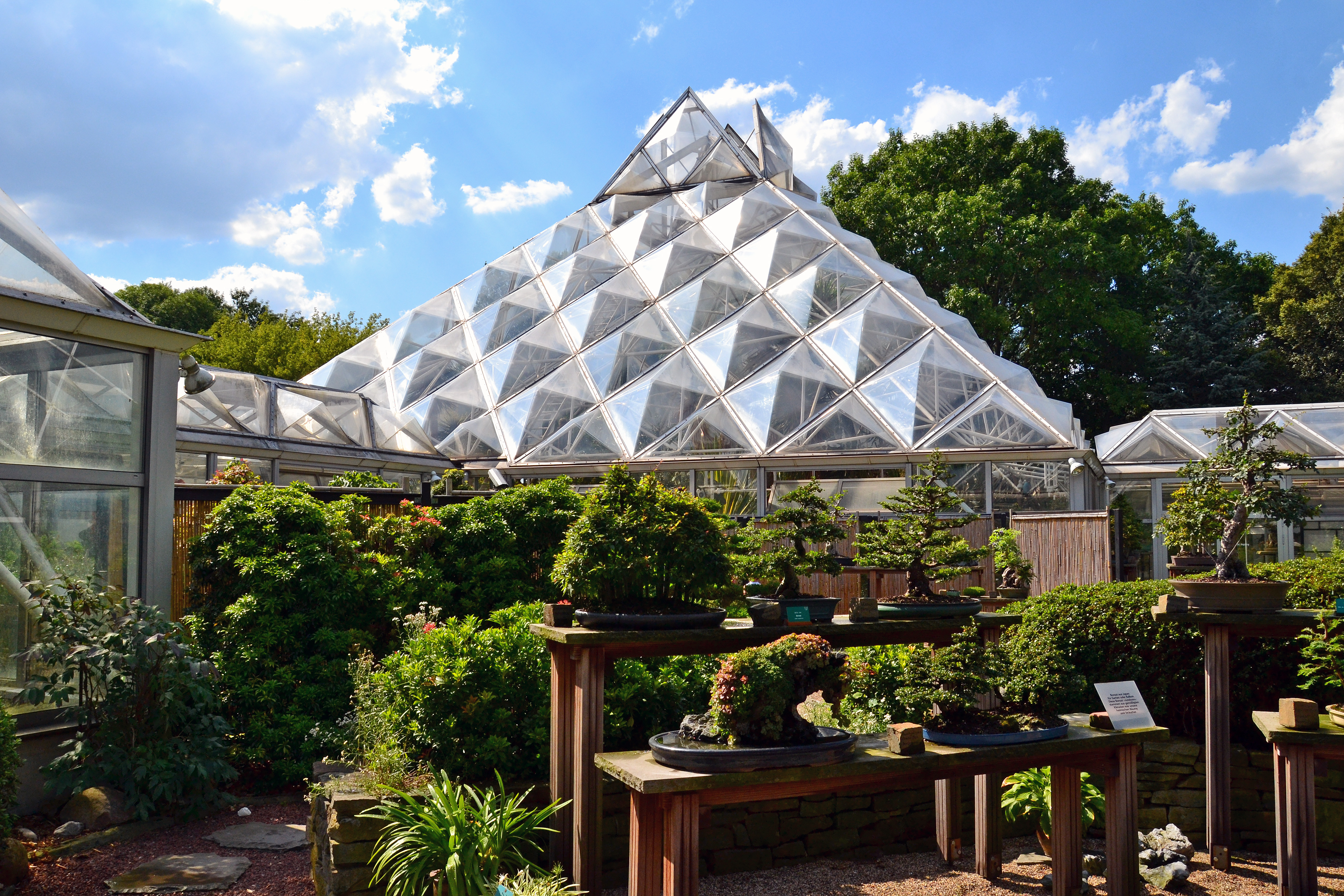
bonsai part of the Botanischer Garten Grugapark

The Botanischer Garten Grugapark is a municipal botanical garden located in the Grugapark at Virchowstraße 167a, Essen, North Rhine-Westphalia, Germany. It is open daily; an admission fee is charged.

The garden was established in 1927 for recreation, teaching, and research. Parts of the garden were destroyed in World War II but gradually rebuilt and re-designed for the Essen Bundesgartenschau of 1965. Today its major sections are as follows:

- Alpinum - mountain plants from the Caucasus, the Carpathians, and the Apennines, including gentians, alpine violets, asters, and pine trees, as well as Taiwania.
- Asia section - dove tree, Japanese elm, and Asian hydrangeas, maples, and walnut trees.
- Climbing plants - self-described as Germany's largest collection of climbing plants, including clematis, honeysuckle, climbing hydrangea, wolfberry, and wild vines.
- Conifers (planted 1927) - self-described as one of Europe's largest collections, including

native conifers, araucaria, thuja, ginkgos, sequoia, dawn redwood, and the oldest cryptomeria group in North Rhine-Westphalia.

- Forest valley - American sweet gums, pin oaks, bald cypresses, and a meadow with wild herbs.
- Herb garden - medicinal herb garden in a medieval style.
- Mediterranean orangery (built 1987) - acacias, bay laurels, date palms, fig trees, and lemon and orange trees.
- Rhododendron valley - 500 rhododendron species and cultivars.
- Rose garden (planted 1927) - rose cultivars and water lily pond.
- Sensory garden - primarily roses and herbs.
- Shrubbery (planted 1964) - several thousand shrubs from Asia, the Americas, and Europe, as well as cowslip, delphinium, Carpathian harebell, heuchera, lupin, red hot pokers, primrose, and giant rhubarb.
- Westphalian cottage garden (circa 1925) - medicinal and culinary herbs and local vegetables representative of a Westphalian farmer's garden.
- Wetlands - bald cypress, bamboos, reeds, willows, etc.

The garden also includes three greenhouses, built in 1985, for its tropical rainforest collection, succulents, and primeval plants from Australia and tropical South East Asia. Other features of interest include a bonsai garden, a scenic pond (the Margarethensee), and a Ronald McDonald House designed by Friedensreich Hundertwasser in 2005.

== See also ==
- Botanischer Garten der Universität Duisburg-Essen
- List of botanical gardens in Germany
