= Structural road design =

Road strength via vehicle count

Structural road design aims to ensure the road is strong enough for the expected number of vehicles in a certain number of years. The input of a calculation is the number expected of vehicles (e.g. 10,000,000) divided in groups (e.g. trucks, vans, cars) and the number of years that the road has to function before the road structure has to be fully renewed (e.g. 20 years).

The given example of 20 years does not mean that there is no maintenance during this period. There is a certain amount of maintenance, but it can be scheduled and is low.

For asphalt, the Shell pavement design method is often used.

== See also ==
- Road traffic control
- Geometric design of roads
- Road surface
