= Botanical Garden of the University of Duisburg-Essen =

Botanical garden

Coordinates: 51°25′41″N 6°58′53″E

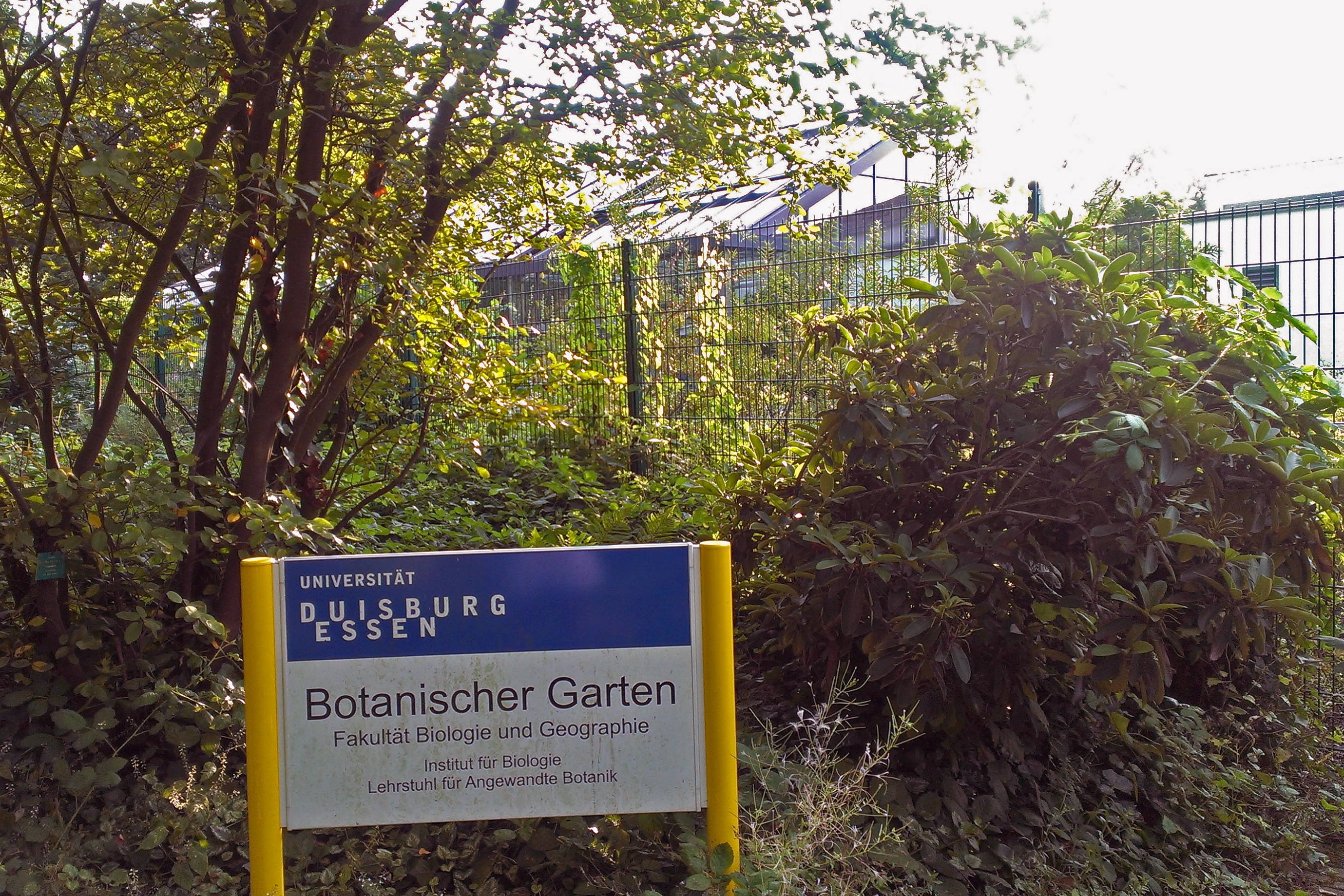
Botanical garden of the University of Duisburg-Essen at Grugapark in Essen

The Botanischer Garten der Universität Duisburg-Essen (4,100 square metres (44,000 sq ft) is a botanical garden maintained on the Essen campus of the University of Duisburg-Essen, North Rhine-Westphalia, Germany. It formerly was located at Henri-Dunant-Strasse 65. Now it is located next to the Grugapark area at Kühlshammerweg 30. The garden is maintained for research and educational uses, and is not open to the public.

The garden was established in the early 1980s by Dr. Guido Benno Feige, Professor of Botany. Today, it cultivates approximately 3,500 species in an outdoor area (3,000 square metres (32,000 sq ft)) and greenhouses (1,100 square metres (12,000 sq ft)). The garden contains about 170 species of carnivorous plants, one of the largest such collections in Germany, as well as good collections of Euphorbia (300 species), Mediterranean plants (250 species), Haworthia and Aloe (65 species), as well as Aeonium, Conophyllum (40 species), Rhipsalis, and rare plants from Socotra.

== See also ==
- Botanischer Garten Grugapark
- List of botanical gardens in Germany
