= Wasserverband Westdeutsche Kanäle =

German statutory body

- Abbreviation: WWK
- Formation: January 1970
- Type: Statutory authority in public-private partnership
- Legal status: Nonprofit organization
- Purpose: service water supply in the Ruhr region
- Headquarters: Germany, 44137 Dortmund, Königswall 29
- Verbandsvorsteher: Dr. Stefan Laarmann
- Chief Operating Officer: Prof. Dr. Burkhard Teichgräber
- Affiliations: Joint administration with Lippeverband
- Website: under construction

The Wasserverband Westdeutsche Kanäle (WWK) is a German statutory body for the adjustment of the Lippe water level and service water supply from the West German shipping canals and artificial watercourses in connection with the rivers Rhine, Lippe and Ruhr.

== Responsibilities and Tasks of the Wasserverband Westdeutsche Kanäle (WWK) ==
Responsibilities and tasks of the WWK (= water board West German canals) are defined in the related statutes, enacted December 3, 1969, based on a treaty between the German Federal Ministry for Transport and the Federal State of North Rhine-Westphalia and an executive order of the Environment Ministry of North Rhine-Westphalia (Germany). The WWK is a public German water board (“Wasserverband”) located in Essen (North Rhine-Westphalia/Germany) and responsible for the adjustment of the river Lippe water level and service water supply from the West German shipping canals and artificial watercourses in connection with the rivers Rhine, Lippe and Ruhr. The responsibilities are solely covering the water supply sector and not the operation of the shipping canals that are under direction of the Federal Waterways Authority (Bundeswasserstraßenverwaltung). The catchment area of the WWK comprises the Rhine-Herne Canal, the Wesel-Datteln Canal, the Datteln-Hamm Canal and the Dortmund-Ems Canal. The main tasks are

- operation and development of (new) pumping stations at sluices,
- cooperation with the water supplier Gelsenwasser regarding the water exchange facility between the river Lippe and the Datteln-Hamm Canal in Hamm and from the Dortmund-Ems Canal to the river Stever in Senden,
- the provision of water for the replenishment of Lippe flow and
- in the role of the supplier of water services to calculate and charge the arising costs in cooperation with the Federal Waterways Authority.

Though being a statutory body the WWK has no sovereign power but depends on permissions of governmental institutions. For the amount of water tapped by local clients individual permissions from the responsible municipal or District Council departments are obligatory. Regulating authorities are the District Council of Düsseldorf and the Environment Ministry of North Rhine-Westphalia. Moreover, the distributed volume of water depends on pump capacities and demands of the shipway trafficability. As the canals are designed for navigation all other interests are second-rank. Members of the WWK decide about the guidelines of the association, the business plan and fees, elect the chairman (“Verbandsvorsteher”) and chief operating officer (“Geschäftsführer”). The number of votes depends on the quantity to be received

- of water that is used and has to be treated separately and discharged as waste water and/or
- of water that has been removed, warmed-up and discharged again into the canal.

The control and supervision is carried out from a centralized telecontrol station in Datteln

== History ==
=== Origins and early development of WWK ===
The West German shipping canals serve the mass transportation in the Ruhr region between the rivers Rhine and Ems direction North Sea and via the Mittelland Canal to the Weser, Elbe, Oder and Vistula. This canal network shows the highest traffic density in Europe. The canals are state-owned by the Federal Waterways Authority (Bundeswasserstraßenverwaltung”). The construction of artificial shipping canals was necessary in the industrialisation period of the Ruhr due to lacking transportation routes via capable, navigable rivers. The oldest part, the Dortmund-Ems Canal, is connecting the eastern Ruhr since 1898 with the North Sea. In 1914 the connection to the Rhine followed via the Rhine-Herne Canal and the Datteln-Hamm Canal was opened, too. In 1930 the Wesel-Datteln Canal was finished. All these connected waterways need to bridge altitude differences between the starting point, the connected harbours and the arrival point. For these purposes there are today e.g at the Rhine-Herne Canal 5 sluices and at the Wesel-Datteln Canal 6 sluices; at the Henrichenburg boat lift two ancient and two actually utilized sluices facilitate the bypassing of the altitude difference within the Dortmund-Ems-Kanal to Dortmund harbour. To feed the planned canal system with water already in 1905 before the construction of the Datteln-Hamm Canal the decision was passed by the Prussian State to use 10 m^{3}/second water from the river Lippe – the only relevant river in the area – for the compensation of evaporation, infiltration and loss of water from the sluices). That was leading from 1914 on to severe water management problems in the river Lippe where in dry summers only 4 m^{3}/second water was left downstream. From 1926 on the newly established water board Lippeverband negotiated with the competent authorities and finally the governmental waterway administration (“Reichswasserstraßenverwaltung”) confirmed to reduce the water abstraction to 7.5 m^{3}/second from 1938 on. The industrial development of the coal and steel industry and especially the coal-fired power stations after World War II meant a growing demand of service water (from the canals and the river Lippe) and a growing discharge of too warm and/or unsatisfactory treated waste water into the river Lippe. Negotiations of the Lippeverband with the government of North Rhine Westphalia and with the Federal Waterways Authority (Bundeswasserstraßenverwaltung) were finally from 1968 on leading to new regulations: The ’’Wasserverband Westdeutsche Kanäle’’ WWK was established, consisting of representatives of the Lippeverband and the water users, accompanied by the Federal Waterways Authority and the Environment Ministry of North Rhine Westphalia . Moreover, the permission for maximum discharge of the Lippe into the West German canal system was increased to 10 m^{3}/second again but now with the additional limitation to guarantee a minimum discharge of 10 m^{3}/second in the Lippe, too, otherwise the water abstraction for the canals had to be limited. This regulation was possible because of already constructed pumps at the sluices that started compensating partly the loss of water from locking. In the years 1973-1978 a series of new pumping stations was established that could serve the canals “upstream” from the rivers Rhine and Ruhr and discharge “downstream” in case the Lippe has enough water to supply with. Parallel pumping systems had been developed along the Rhine-Herne Canal and the Wesel-Datteln Canal/ Datteln-Hamm Canal, all controlled and supervised from a centralized telecontrol station.

== The WWK at present ==
Today the Lippe and the West German canal system still play a decisive role regarding the supply of industry and businesses with service water, even though the water demand in total is declining. Circular economy, energy efficiency in all kind of businesses and the reduced water demand due to the changing energy policy (reduction of thermal power stations) unburden the river. Moreover, the discharge of warmed water back to the river has been regulated by public law. Improved municipal waste water treatment and the decline of coal mining have had positive impact on the water management, too. The water demand for shipping nevertheless is important in the West German canal system. To compensate the loss of water from evaporation, infiltration and locking in the sluices annually 500 million m^{3} of water have to be injected. To reduce especially in dry weather periods the demand of water that gets lost from the sluices it is locally pumped up again. The total water demand from the canal system of up to 800 million m^{3}/year is mainly covered by supply from the Lippe and Ruhr. The permission to withdraw up to 25 m^{3}/second from the Lippe still today is limited to a remaining discharge in the Lippe of 10 m^{3}/second. If the water level in the river falls below that flow rate the Lippe receives up to 4.5 m^{3}/second out of the canal system for low water replenishment. For example in the 12 months period from November 2014 to October 2015 the Lippe discharged on 257 days water into the Datteln-Hamm Canal and on 102 days canal water was pumped into the Lippe.

=== Drinking Water ===
The Stever is a tributary of the Lippe which is fed by water out of the Dortmund-Ems Canal and has a huge meaning for drinking water supply for the northern Ruhr region. To balance the whole system the Stever – after being fed out of the canal in Senden – is backed-up in two water reservoirs (Talsperre Hullern and Halterner Stausee) of 32 million m^{3} capacity. Two-thirds of the Stever flow is discharged downstream; one-third is used by the drinking water supplier Gelsenwasser AG for drinking water processing via soil infiltration from groundwater wells (of all together approximately 129 million m^{3}/year). Additionally the municipal utilities Stadtwerke Münster use water from the Dortmund-Ems Canal to supply the groundwater wells for drinking water processing. In total, via several water works annually 250 million m^{3} of water are transported in pipework from the Ruhr to the area at the canals. The regionally diversified origin and processing of drinking water – pumped water from Rhine and Ruhr, various groundwater wells, replenishment with infiltrated canal water – guarantees constantly the regional supply with water of highest quality in Ruhr and Münsterland region. Hereby it is also possible in case of calamities (like exceeding threshold values at certain groundwater wells) to substitute the water supply from other sources (like the infiltration of canal water).

=== Service Water ===
Along the canals industry and businesses consume about 60 million m^{3} annually for cooling, production, irrigation and the afore mentioned processing of ground water wells. Frequent measurements of state-approved inspection authorities show results and values close to drinking water quality in the canals. The network of the canals in the densely populated Ruhr region and the high water quality is (since 1989 the Internationale Bauausstellung Emscher Park took place) frequently topic in scientific, public and political debates about the utilisation of attractive urban water fronts, also in context with climate change aspects.

=== Members and data ===
Members of the WWK are according to the status 31.12.2014:

- the Lippeverband (with focus on the water level of the river Lippe),
- 36 water abstractors of canal water (industry and businesses),
- 6 enterprises for public water supply as canal water abstractors for drinking water purposes and for service water supply to third parties.

Customers with lower water demand may draw insignificant amounts without becoming a formal member. In cases of water shortage they have to renounce the supply for the benefit of the regular members. The need of service water varies very much – for example annually for a public pool 500 m^{3}/year up to 15 million m^{3}/year for a thermal power station. All together the withdrawal is on the average 60 million m^{3}/year (with downward drift). The technically possible maximum of 400 million m^{3}/year has never been used. The discharge of canal water via the Stever into Halterner Stausee and Talsperre Hullern depends on the annual rainfall, for example the discharge in 1976 was 11.5 million m^{3} but in “wet years” nothing is discharged. The withdrawal of service water that is used and has to be treated separately and discharged as waste water is invoiced with 0.0353 €/m^{3} (waste water is invoiced separately by the operator of the wastewater treatment facility). For water that has been removed, warmed-up and discharged again into the canal the invoice value is 3.3% of that amount. The fees cover the costs that appear from operation and maintenance of the pumping stations and other costs related to the water services.

== Technical facilities ==
- Exchange facility Lippe in Hamm 1972
- Pumping station Oberhausen 1974
- Pumping station Gelsenkirchen 1975
- Pumping station Wanne-Eickel 1977
- Pumping station Herne-Ost 1979
- Pumping station Hamm-Werries 1981
- Pumping station Friedrichsfeld 1982
- Pumping station Hünxe 1982
- Pumping station Duisburg-Meiderich 1982
- Telecontrol station Datteln 1984
- Pumping station Dorsten 1985
- Exchange facility Stever in Senden 1985
- Pumping station Flaesheim 1986
- Pumping station Ahsen 1988
- Pumping station Datteln 1988
