= Internationale Bauausstellung Emscher Park =

Structural change program in Germany

The Internationale Bauausstellung Emscher Park (IBA Emscher Park) or International Architecture Exhibition Emscher Park was a programme for structural changes in the so-called German Ruhr region from 1989 to 1999 in order to show new concepts in terms of social, cultural and ecologic ideas.

== History ==
The government of North Rhine-Westphalia decided in 1988 to carry out the IBA Emscher Park to achieve a paradigm shift from the "rust belt" towards a green, modern and wealthy metropolitan area. In the past the regions who had carried out an Internationale Bauausstellung (Darmstadt 1901, Leipzig 1913, Stuttgart 1927, Berlin 1957 and 1984) mainly aimed at architectural improvements and highlights, whereas the IBA Emscher Park aimed a holistic approach by restructuring a former industrial region, the Ruhr, with outstanding urbanistic, architectural, cultural, ecological and economic incentives. In the 1980s, the Ruhr region faced growing unemployment rates as a result of the shutdown of most mines and many steel works, environmental problems especially regarding brownfields and waste land and the river Emscher system. The IBA programme therefore was covering 7 general principles to overcome the structural difficulties:

- Reconstruction of landscape – the Emscher Landscape Park
- Ecological restoration of the river Emscher system
- Rhein-Herne Canal – an adventure space
- Industrial cultural heritage as national treasure
- Working in the park
- New forms of houses and housing
- New options for social, cultural and sports activities.

== The 7 general principles details ==
The intention of the IBA Emscher Park was to develop in parallel structural changes covering the whole area and to initiate lighthouse projects that work as local stimulation and attract attention. The region was suffering from its image as rust belt for more than a hundred years and even though a lot of green spaces and landscape existed this was not highlighted before and made the region – a misgiving of the government – not attractive for investments or long-term improvements. The time stretch of 10 years (1989-1999) was chosen to create changes that do not only present single solutions on buildings but to enable public partners to activate complex interdisciplinary planning processes that work in the long run. Moreover, the processes partly were organized in a way that projects like the restoration of the Emscher system were scheduled to last up to the year 2025. The initiators of the IBA were aiming at changes to become deeply rooted in regional planning culture.

=== Reconstruction of landscape – the Emscher Landscape Park ===
The Emscher Landscape Park was identified to be the 800 km^{2} of “open space” in the region – agricultural land, forests, brownfields with plant carpet, vegetation at railway embankments, slag heaps, and other more or less green structures. The classical meaning of a park was not visible here, so the aim was to connect fragmented green structures, develop new ones and make the open spaces accessible for public. For example, within the Emscher Landscape Park a huge number of previous railway lines were located that lost their meaning and function with the decline of the mines. With support of the IBA and public funding these railway dams were converted to work as regional bike path network. The Kommunalverband Ruhrgebiet (today Regionalverband Ruhrgebiet, RVR) took over the responsibility for the development and coordination of the Emscher Landscape Park and worked in cooperation with the municipalities in 7 “sub-parks” (green belts A to G), with Emschergenossenschaft and Lippeverband and other public players like the owner of slag heaps RAG AG on the quality and quantity of green connections. From 1991 on the government of North Rhine-Westphalia supported the Emscher Landscape Park projects with the “Ökologieprogramm Emscher-Lippe”, a funding instrument fed by the European Regional Development Fund (ERDF) and Federal State funds, co-financing measures with 80% to 90%. Within 20 years (1991 – 2010) around 680 Mio. € funding have been invested in more than 400 Emscher Landscape Park projects, mainly by municipalities and RVR. The Regionalverband Ruhrgebiet is still responsible and caring for the Emscher Landschaftspark.

=== Ecological restoration of the river Emscher system ===
The river Emscher with its approximately 80 km and some hundred kilometres of tributaries was since the 19th century a symbol for the rust belt and ecological problems as the network was working like an open waste water collection and discharge system. The construction of “normal” sewers was in most areas impossible due to mining-induced subsidence. With the decline of the mines the Emschergenossenschaft started in the 1980s first tests for restoration and with the beginning of the IBA processes the Emschergenossenschaft set up a programme for pilot projects. Besides the very technical measures (construction of new decentralised waste water treatment plants, construction of about 350 km of new sewers) it was necessary to start as well with the renaturation of open water courses to show the ecological potential and urban development chances such projects can bring. One of the first IBA projects was the 9 km Dorneburger Mühlenbach/Hüller Bach in Bochum, jointly developed by the Emschergenossenschaft and the municipality of Bochum in cooperation with neighbouring cities and many private land owners. Regarding the above-mentioned effects for investments and structural changes in the long run the restoration was for example leading to the construction of a new quarter at the banks. In the frame of the IBA the Emschergenossenschaft started to change the waste water fee system. It was the first catchment area in Germany that had a split of the fees, charging both for domestic waste water and paved areas with the consequence that disconnection and infiltration of rain water from roofs etc. was economically interesting for everybody.

=== Rhein-Herne Canal – an adventure space ===
The 46 km Rhein-Herne Canal had been developed from 1906 to 1914 to support the trade of coal and steel in the growing Ruhr region. With the decline of the mines it lost a little its meaning and many ancient harbours had not been used for commercial purposes any more. The IBA idea was to use the former industrial harbours for new uses and initiate waterfront architecture, combined with leisure and ecological qualities. The legal frame was partly complicated as the artificial shipping canals are legally handled like a “motorway for ships” and not like rivers, so permissions and uses are very regulated. Nevertheless, many improved leisure uses, bike paths and a couple of new buildings were established, for example at Stadthafen Recklinghausen or the new city quarter at harbour Bismarck in Gelsenkirchen Further changes will appear when the canal and its locks are widened until 2025 to be adapted to modern push boats.

=== Industrial cultural heritage as national treasure ===
Industrial cultural heritage was a challenging IBA topic as it dealt with many deserted mine buildings and technical equipment that was no longer needed and used. Therefore, on the one hand (public) funding to restore these buildings and on the other hand a follow-up application was needed to manage the cultural heritage successfully. The IBA initiators aimed at creating identification and a unique atmosphere by restoring and presenting the relicts of the 150 years industry history. The idea behind was that all other metropolitan regions have special features that form images and identification – internally for the inhabitants as well as for tourists and visitors. Besides many smaller buildings that are often used for businesses or administrations now some of the large sites managed to fulfil the expectations. Industrial relicts like Gasometer Oberhausen, Jahrhunderthalle Bochum or Landschaftspark Duisburg-Nord are today very popular sites with millions of visitors.

=== Working in the park ===
Increasing unemployment rates especially regarding the former primary sector, influx of the population into the city districts after German reunification and the structural changes in general after the pull-out of the industrial sector asked for new solutions on working places. The idea of “working in the park” meant that former mine or steel sites should be redeveloped to attractive, green and modern working places in combination with cultural heritage if possible. The development of these sites was often asking for environmental remediation and innovative ideas on how to deal with surface water (that should not infiltrate through polluted soil). Projects like in Bochum “Ökologischer Gewerbepark Zeche Holland” with outstanding stormwater management systems or the business park on the former coal mine Erin in Castrop-Rauxel with the polluted soil being encapsulated in pyramids show some of the innovative approaches.

=== New forms of houses and housing ===
The search for “new” forms of houses and living together was partly a kind of “back to the roots” as the historical settlements like mine owners and steel companies had created for their workers were becoming very popular again. Beautiful settlements were restored and partly new houses were adapted that followed the rules of former architects and spatial planners. The garden city ideal can be seen today in settlements like in Herne, or in Bottrop at Gartenstadt Welheim. The Gelsenkirchen project “Siedlung Küppersbusch” tried to realize the historical garden city approach in a completely new developed settlement on a previous industrial site.

=== New options for social, cultural and sports activities ===
The idea behind this cross-cut topic was to offer new kinds of employment or chances to spend leisure time due to the ongoing reduction of working lifetime. Garden plots or aspects of “urban gardening” were discussed additionally to the Emscher Landscape Park offers and the cultural events that came up in combination with the orchestration of cultural heritage.

== Participants ==
The management of the IBA Emscher Park was carried out by a public body (Planungsgesellschaft IBA Emscher Park GmbH) that coordinated the municipal participants and other public and private bodies. The involved cities were Dortmund, Kamen, Bergkamen, Waltrop, Lünen, Castrop-Rauxel, Recklinghausen, Herten, Herne, Bochum, Essen, Mülheim, Gelsenkirchen, Gladbeck, Bottrop, Oberhausen and Duisburg. Supporting partners were Emschergenossenschaft and Lippeverband, Kommunalverband Ruhrgebiet, Deutsche Bahn, RAG AG and many other local partners. Within the cities more than 100 large projects were carried out.
