= Water board =

Water management authority

A water board is a regional or national organisation that has very different functions from one country to another. The functions range from flood control and water resources management at the regional or local level (the Netherlands, Germany), water charging and financing at the river basin level (France), bulk water supply (South Africa), regulation of pricing and service quality of drinking water supply at the national level (Kenya) or the coordination of water resources policies between various Ministries and agencies at the national level together with the regulation of drinking water supply (the Philippines).

== France ==
A water agency in France, formerly called a basin agency, is a public administrative establishment that participates in water management within an administrative basin district, whose boundaries correspond to a large hydrographic basin. There are six of them, all established by the Water Law of 1964, specified by the Law of 3 January 1992. The hydrographic basins of the overseas departments of Guadeloupe, French Guiana, Martinique, and Réunion are equipped with a Water Office, with equivalent missions.

In 2000 the European Union created hydrographic districts based on the model of these basin agencies; in other countries their activities are fulfilled by a water board.

== Germany ==
In Germany water boards (Wasserverbände or Wasserwirtschaftsverbände), also sometimes translated as water associations, are organizations set up under public law for different purposes ranging from wastewater treatment, flood protection, groundwater management, bulk water supply, irrigation, drainage, the restoration and protection of ecosystems to water resources monitoring.

Water boards are established on the legal basis of the federal law on water and soil associations (Gesetz über Wasser- und Bodenverbände), complemented by state laws in several German states (Länder) such as in Lower Saxony where water boards are in charge of coastal protection or North Rhine-Westphalia where water boards are based on state laws passed specifically for the purpose of creating these public service and welfare organisations. Membership can be voluntary or mandatory, depending on the purpose of the water board. Members can be individuals, typically landowners in the area covered by a water board, or municipalities. The members of the Wasserverband Westdeutsche Kanäle are for example industrial players and drinking water suppliers, too. There are thousands of water boards in Germany, mostly in Northern Germany and usually consisting of individual members. The first such water boards were created for coastal protection in the 13th century as private associations that subsequently evolved into boards established under public law.

Wasserwirtschaftsverbände in North Rhine-Westphalia are a different type of water boards and may also have members from industry, mining companies, slaughterhouses, hospitals etc., depending on the volume of waste water or impact on the regional water management. The 11 here established water boards (Aggerverband, Bergisch-Rheinischer Wasserverband, Emschergenossenschaft, Lippeverband, Erftverband, Linksniederrheinische Entwässerungsgenossenschaft (LINEG), Niersverband, Ruhrverband, Wahnbachtalsperrenverband, Wasserverband Eifel-Rur, Wupperverband) have their historical starting point in the industrial developments in the 19th century and are always public and non-profit organisations.

In parallel, in the middle of the 19th century the Emscher catchment experienced hard coal mining and steel industry, in the Erft catchment brown coal mining started and in the Wupper catchment chemical and textile industry expanded. The growing environmental and health problems were leading to legislative solutions with specialized catchments area related laws. In 1899 the Emschergenossenschaft was founded and the other Wasserwirtschaftsverbände followed hereafter. Today about 75% of the land area in North Rhine-Westphalia are managed by Wasserwirtschaftsverbände, covering the sub catchments of the Rhine or Meuse tributaries. The administrative and organisational frame is comparable to the Dutch water boards (waterschappen).

== Kenya ==
Water Services Boards in Kenya are asset holding companies. They are responsible for the development and rehabilitation of water and sewerage facilities, for investment planning and implementation in their service area. There are 8 regional Water Service Boards in the country. The Water Service Boards have signed service provision agreements with 120 local Water Service Providers that are responsible for the operation of water and sewerage systems. The Water Service Providers are regulated by a national body called the Water Services Regulatory Board (WASREB), a non-commercial state corporation established in March 2003 on the basis of the 2002 Water Act. Its functions comprise among others: issuing of licenses to water services boards and approval of service provision agreements between service providers and asset holding companies, developing tariff guidelines and carrying out tariff negotiations, setting standards and developing guidelines for service provision, publishing the results of sector monitoring in the form of comparative reports.

== Netherlands ==
Dutch water boards (Dutch: waterschappen or hoogheemraadschappen) are regional government bodies charged with managing water barriers, waterways, water levels, water quality and sewage treatment in their respective regions. These regional water authorities are among the oldest forms of local government in the Netherlands, some of them having been founded in the 13th century.

== Philippines ==
The National Water Resources Board (NWRB), created in 1976 through the National Water Code, coordinates policies concerning water resources. Since 2002, the National Water Resources Board (NWBR) is also entrusted with the economic regulation of water supply systems operated by local government units and water districts.

== Sri Lanka ==
The National Water Supply and Drainage Board is the National Organization responsible for the provision of safe drinking water and facilitating the provision of sanitation to the people in Sri Lanka. The main functions of the organization are implementation of new urban and rural water supply projects, carrying out sector planning, feasibility studies, detailed designs, tender documentation, contract administration, project supervision and research and development work in the water and sanitation sector.

== South Africa ==
Water Boards play a key role in the South African water sector. They operate dams, bulk water supply infrastructure, some retail infrastructure and some wastewater systems. Some also provide technical assistance to municipalities. Through their role in the operation of dams they also play an important role in water resources management. The Water Boards report to the Department of Water and Forestry.

== United Kingdom ==
=== Water boards ===
Water boards were public authorities created as joint bodies of multiple local councils to provide clean water suppliers. They were created by local acts of Parliament or by orders, particularly in the 1960s to try to achieve better economies of scale.

In 1974 the water boards were merged into the ten regional water authorities.

=== Regional water authorities ===
A regional water authority, commonly known as a water board, was one of a group of public bodies that came into existence in England and Wales in April 1974, as a result of the Water Act 1973 coming into force. This brought together in ten regional units a diverse range of bodies involved in water treatment and supply, sewage disposal, land drainage, river pollution and fisheries. They lasted until 1989, when the water industry was privatised and the water supply and sewerage and sewage disposal parts became companies and the regulatory arm formed the National Rivers Authority. Regional water authorities were also part of the Scottish water industry when three bodies covering the North, West and East of Scotland were created in 1996, to take over responsibilities for water supply and sewage treatment from the regional councils, but they only lasted until 2002, when they were replaced by the publicly owned Scottish Water.

== United States ==
A fresh water supply district is a body which manages fresh water supply in a defined area in the United States. It may have the power of eminent domain. The term fresh water supply district is mostly used in Texas, while water district is used in much of the rest of the United States. Fresh water supply districts were first established in Texas in 1919 and serve as complements to Texas' other water supply system, water improvement districts. As of 1992, there were 38 fresh water supply districts in Texas.

== See also ==
- In France: Watringue, Agence de l'eau (France)
- Association of Drainage Authorities
- Watershed district (Minnesota)

== Sources ==
- Porter, Elizabeth (1978). Water Management in England and Wales. Cambridge University Press. ISBN 978-0-521-21865-8.
