= Lippeverband =

Public German water board

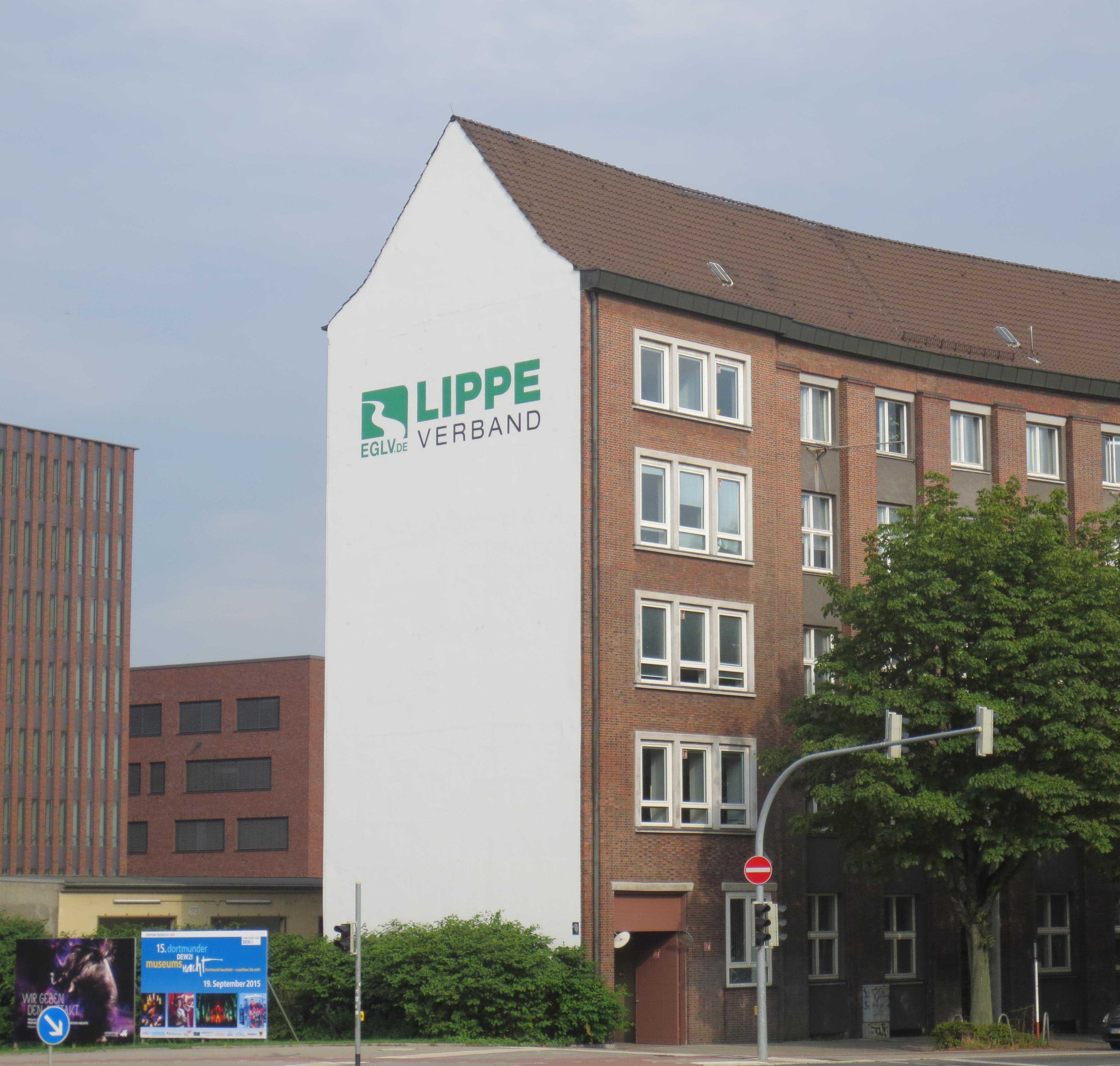
- Administration building of Lippeverband in Dortmund
- Abbreviation: LV
- Formation: 1926
- Type: Statutory authority in public-private partnership
- Legal status: Nonprofit organization
- Purpose: River basin management in the Lippe catchment
- Headquarters: Germany, 44137 Dortmund, Königswall 29
- Chief Executive Officer: Dr. Uli Paetzel
- Chief Operating Officer: Dr. Frank Obenaus
- Affiliations: Joint administration with Emschergenossenschaft
- Website: https://www.eglv.de

The Lippeverband is a public German water board (“Wasserwirtschaftsverband”) located in Dortmund (North Rhine-Westphalia/Germany) and responsible for 3.280 km² of the Lippe catchment from Lippborg down to the river Rhine with 1.4 Mio. citizens. The Lippeverband offers modern, cost-effective water management that covers a broad range of responsibilities. The main tasks are sewage treatment, care and maintenance of waterways, natural remodelling of open waste water canals, flood protection, regulation of water flow and management of groundwater and rainwater.

== History ==
=== Origins and early development ===
The river Lippe appears as a two-tier water course: Upstream, eastward of the city of Hamm/Lippborg, the catchment is more rural. Downstream of Hamm settlements and industrial impacts characterize the situation. Preconditions for the industrialization started with the construction of the Cologne-Minden trunk line in the 1840s that connected the river Rhine settlements like Cologne with harbours and trade at the river Weser and on this route with Lippe towns, too. Moreover, this railway supported the coal and steel industry development in the whole northern Ruhr region. The hard coal mining that started in the middle of the 19th century in the Emscher catchment area developed in the following decades direction north. In the Lippe catchment area from the 1860s on first problems from mining subsidence and drainage of polluted water appeared. Villages and towns located at the Lippe and its tributary Seseke (Werl, Unna, Hamm, Bönen, Kamen, Bergkamen, Lünen and Dortmund) expanded quickly with the establishing of hard coal mines between 1856 and World War I. The industrialization caused huge water quality problems in the Lippe, its tributaries and the settlements; therefore first in 1913 the Sesekegenossenschaft and later in 1926 the Lippeverband as public water boards (“Wasserwirtschaftsverbände”) were established.

The Sesekegenossenschaft was from 1913 on responsible for the water management and the precursor of the Lippeverband from 1926 on. The Lippe tributary Seseke has a catchment area of 319,45 km² and drains the towns of Werl, Unna, Bönen, Kamen, Bergkamen, Lünen and the east of Dortmund. The Seseke catchment area suffered from “subsidence funnels” where waste water, surface run-off and water from the creeks gathered and digested; so interdisciplinary solutions were needed, comparable to the Emschergenossenschaft in the neighboring catchment area which hosted the Sesekegenossenschaft in the first years. The municipalities were responsible for the inner city drainage systems and interconnection points were jointly defined where the Sesekegenossenschaft took over responsibility. Those were normally the subcatchment parts where underground sewer systems were impossible as the mining subsidence would have caused damages continuously and waste water would have infiltrated in groundwater and soil. The Sesekegenossenschaft (and later the Lippeverband) then worked on the drainage capacity by cutting the meanders of the water courses, deepening the runways and lining them with concrete, constructing dykes and pumping stations and establishing waste water treatment plants. All discharge from industry, mines and households as well as rain, surface water and natural discharge were collected and drained in these new “concrete streams”. All costs were divided between the “users” of the Seseke system, depending on the volume and load of waste water or drainage capacity or causer (for example the mining companies).

Governmental investigations showed that the measures that were taken in the Seseke system were expected to solve problems in the rest of the Lippe catchment area, too. Formally, the „Lippegesetz“ (Lippe act) was legislated on Januar 19th 1926 and the Sesekegenossenschaft merged into the new water board.

More and more measures had to be taken to compensate negative impacts of the mining that went in northern direction and caused damages in the Lippe catchment area between Hamm and the Lippe mouth at the river Rhine near Wesel. Dykes were built for flood prevention, waste water treatment facilities and pumping stations kept the systems running.

=== Later development ===
Until the 1970s water pollution played no important role in the public debate but environmental policy changed over the decades. Environmental standards on national level and especially from the EU have been leading to enormous efforts to improve the nature standards and today a couple of positive developments can be stated, like new FFH (Flora Fauna Habitat) sites and governmental initiatives around the WFD (Water Framework Directive).

Especially the sub catchment of the Seseke has experienced enormous efforts to restore the system. Since the 1960s, the coal crisis was leading to the shutdown of more and more mines and the Lippeverband with its administrative, political and industrial members decided to re-develop the Seseke system towards „second hand nature“ – a real restoration compared to the times before industrialization is impossible. Between the 1980s and 2012 four waste water treatment plants were constructed in Bönen, Kamen, Dortmund-Scharnhorst and Lünen. A new 75 km underground sewer system was constructed and 73 km of former “concrete water courses” were restored to work as ecological green belts in the landscape now.

Challenges for the Lippeverband are still the water quality demands. Though the Lippeverband is not a drinking water provider there are water bodies in the catchment area that are used by Gelsenwasser for drinking water supply and where Lippeverband waste water treatment plants are discharging to. The Lippeverband started operating first treatment facilities voluntarily with advanced technologies and initiated European network projects on the environmental impact of pharmaceuticals and personal care products and how to eliminate them from hospitals or domestic waste water.

Further initiatives deal with the impacts of climate change. Moreover, artists and landscape architects are involved in projects to capitalize the newly developed ecological and leisure qualities, for example in the frame of the cultural events of Ruhr.2010 or “Über Wasser gehen” (“walking on water”), a joint initiative of the cities Lünen, Bergkamen, Kamen, Bönen, Unna, Dortmund, the district Unna, the regional planning assembly Ruhr and the “Urbane Künste Ruhr”.

== Responsibilities ==
The Lippeverband is not “owner” of the river Lippe which is in the German hierarchy a “water course first level”. These are historically often the rivers that (once) have been used for shipping and therefore are state-owned asset, in this case under protection of the state of North Rhine-Westphalia. The environment ministry is financing all nature related activities the Lippeverband is carrying out at the river Lippe directly. The work related to tributaries, waste water management and man-made impact has to be financed by the municipalities, businesses, industry and mining companies etc., operationally carried out by the Lippeverband.

Responsibilities and tasks of the Lippeverband are defined in the act „Lippegesetz“, enacted January 16, 1926 and adapted later as „Gesetz über den Lippeverband“ (LippeVG):

- Management of runoff, flood prevention at open water courses and in the sub catchments;
- Maintenance of open water courses and related facilities;
- Ecological restoration of technically altered water courses;
- Groundwater management;
- Compensation of mining impacts on ecological or water management related changes;
- Waste water disposal;
- Disposal of waste from water management services;
- Water quality management;
- Scientific work related to water management challenges;
- Support of drinking water supply, water for industrial use and use of hydropower

Drinking water supply and Lippe river management is carried out in cooperation with the Wasserverband Westdeutsche Kanäle. The Lippeverband is working in an administrative collectivity with the Emschergenossenschaft, the water board established in 1899 in a neighbouring river catchment area. Together, more than 1.500 employees work for both water boards, around 600 of them belong to the Lippeverband. Both water boards together are the biggest water management and service provider in Germany.

== Governance ==
The North Rhine-Westphalian water boards are statutory bodies, working in public-private partnership as non-profit institutions.

The Lippeverband, together with the Emschergenossenschaft, has an administration that is governed by a board of 3 managing directors, elected for 5 years each. The election happens on the level of associates that have representatives in an annual assembly, coming from

- the state of North Rhine-Westphalia,
- 45 municipalities,
- 107 commercial and infrastructure companies and
- 4 mining companies.

The number of representatives per member depends on the number of citizens in the 45 municipalities and on the volume of waste water “produced” by the companies and mines.

The supervisory authority is the Ministry for Climate Protection, Environment, Agriculture, Conservation and Consumer Protection of the State of North Rhine-Westphalia (MKULNV). German water boards are not formal authorities but have to receive permissions and approvals for construction works etc. They are independent in financial and internal management but depend on regulatory decrees regarding water acts.

The tasks are regulated in the Lippeverbandsgesetz (Lippe Association Act) and the statutes and rules of procedure. The bodies of the associations are the cooperative/association assembly, the cooperative/association council and the Executive Board. The association assemblies are the highest decision-making body and are made up of representatives of the members (delegates). The Emscher Cooperative Council and the Lippe Association Council are elected by the respective Association Assembly. The Cooperative and Association Council elects the Executive Board and appoints a member of the Executive Board as Chairperson.

== Catchment Area ==
The river Lippe with a length of in total 220 km is only managed over a stretch of 147 km between Lippborg and Wesel (approx. 3.280 km² of 4.890 km² catchment area) by the Lippeverband.

With an amendment of the Lippeverband act (LippeVG) in 1990 the responsibilities have been extended to smaller catchment areas of tributaries to the Rhine close to the Lippemouth (Mommbach, Stollbach, Langhorster Leitgraben, Lohberger Entwässerungsgraben, Bruckhauser Mühlenbach, Rotbach). Moreover, due to the migration of the hard coal mining to the north, responsibilities for potential impact and compensation were given to the Lippeverband in the mining reserve areas of the municipalities Ahlen, Ascheberg, Beckum, Drensteinfurt, Ennigerloh, Raesfeld and Sendenhorst.

== Data ==
- Members of the Lippeverband: 173
- Catchment area: 3.280 km²
- Population: ca. 1,39 Mio.
- Water courses: 431 km (Lippe: 148 km)
- Waste water sewers: 147 km
- Dykes 76,13 km (Lippe 32,61 km)
- Waste water treatment plants: 54 ( 2,3 Mio. People equivalents)
- Pumping stations: 333
- Part of catchment area drained by pumps (polder areas): 15,7%
- Flood plains: 33
