= Wesel–Datteln Canal =

Canal in North Rhine-Westphalia, Germany

Specifications
- Length: 60 km (37 mi)

History
- Construction began: 1915
- Date completed: 1930

Geography
- Start point: Rhine near Wesel, Germany
- End point: Dortmund-Ems Canal near Datteln, Germany

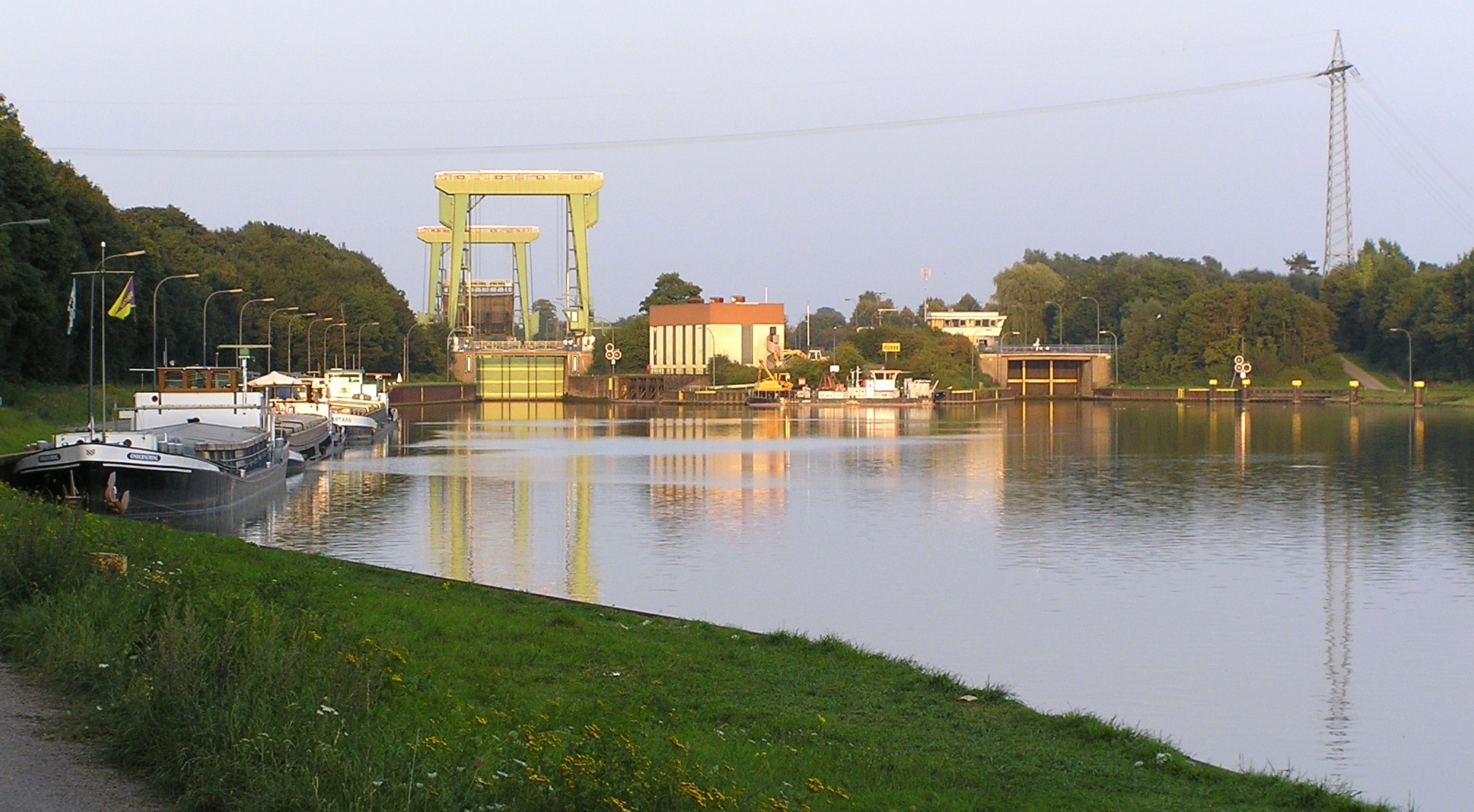
The lock in Hünxe

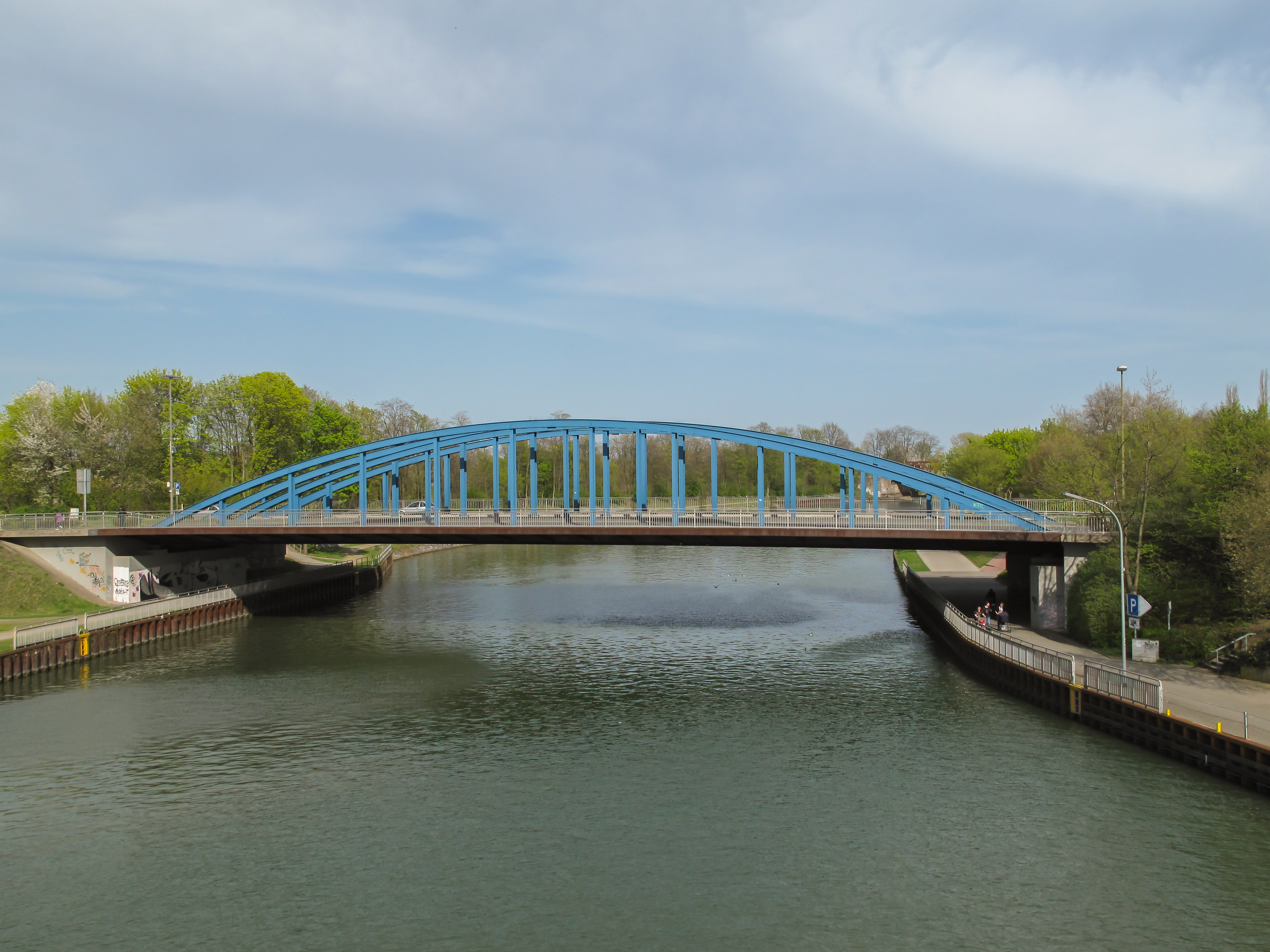
Dorsten, bridge across Wesel-Datteln Kanal

The Wesel–Datteln Canal (German: Wesel-Datteln-Kanal) is a 60-kilometre (37 mi) long canal in North Rhine-Westphalia, Germany. It runs along the northern edge of the Ruhr Area, from the Rhine near Wesel (51°38′21″N 6°36′25″E) to the Dortmund-Ems Canal near Datteln (51°39′45″N 7°21′58″E). It forms an important transport connection between the Lower Rhine and northern and eastern Germany, together with the parallel Rhine-Herne Canal.

Construction of the Wesel–Datteln Canal was started in 1915, and the canal was opened in 1930. It runs parallel to the river Lippe. The canal has six locks, at Friedrichsfeld, Hünxe, Dorsten, Flaesheim, Ahsen and Datteln. The main ports along the canal are in Marl (Chemiepark Marl and Auguste-Victoria).
