= Gasometer Oberhausen =

Coordinates: 51°29′39″N 6°52′14″E

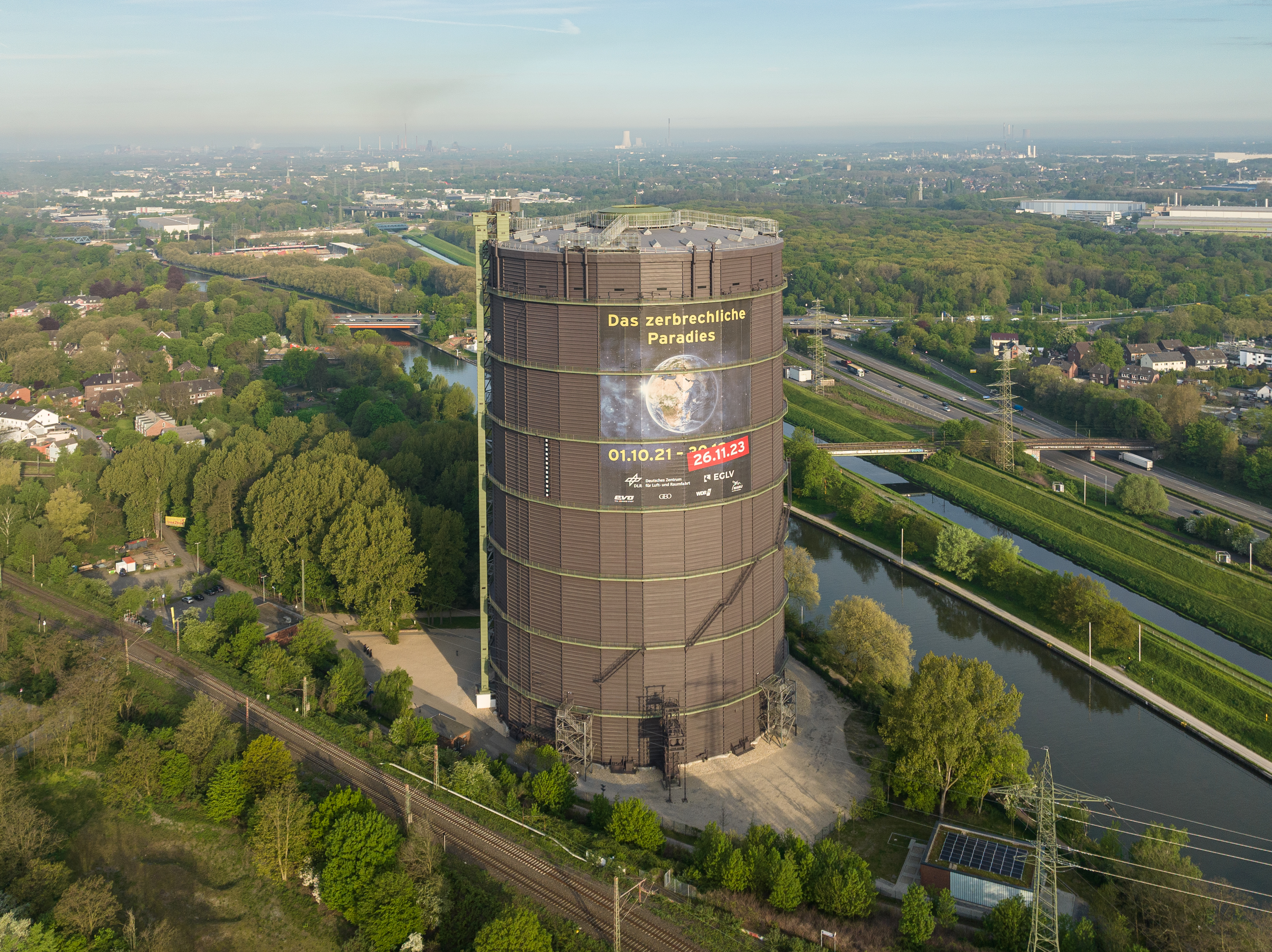
- Oberhausen Gasometer

General information
- Location: Oberhausen, Germany
- Construction started: 27 February 1927
- Completed: 1929
- Inaugurated: 15 May 1929
- Cost: 1.74 million Reichsmarks
- Owner: Ruhrkohle AG (1927–1992); City of Oberhausen (after 1992)

Height
- Height: 117.5 m (385 ft)

Dimensions
- Diameter: 67.6 m (222 ft)

Technical details
- Floor area: 7,000 m^{2} (75,000 sq ft)

Design and construction
- Main contractor: Gutehoffnungshütte (1927-1929); Deutsche Babcock AG (1993–1994)

Website
- http://www.gasometer.de

The Gasometer Oberhausen is a decommissioned gas holder in Oberhausen, Germany, repurposed into a prominent exhibition venue. As an industrial landmark, it serves as an anchor point for both the European Route of Industrial Heritage and the Industrial Heritage Trail. Constructed in the 1920s, the structure was rebuilt following damage sustained during World War II.

Notable for hosting large-scale exhibitions, the Gasometer has featured works by internationally renowned artists, including two installations by Christo and Jeanne-Claude. Its adaptive reuse as a cultural space underscores its significance in preserving industrial heritage while fostering contemporary artistic expression.

== History ==
During the 1920s, the coal and steel industry in the Ruhrgebiet generated blast furnace gas and coal gas as by-products of iron production and coking. These gases were used extensively by steelworks and coking plants, though fluctuations in supply and demand often led to inefficiencies: excess gas was occasionally flared off, while shortages required purchasing alternative fuels. To address this, the Gasometer Oberhausen was constructed as a buffer storage facility, enabling surplus gas to be stored and released when demand exceeded production.

=== Construction and early operation ===
Built by the industrial conglomerate Gutehoffnungshütte adjacent to the Rhine-Herne Canal, construction commenced on 27 February 1927 at a cost of 1.74 million Reichsmark. The structure consisted of a concrete foundation supporting a framework of 24 steel girders, clad with riveted 5 mm thick sheet metal. A movable pressure disc—weighing 1,207,000 kg—was installed inside, floating atop the stored gas to maintain constant pressure. The Gasometer entered service on 15 May 1929, with a storage capacity of 347,000m³, a height of 117.5 m, and a diameter of 67.6 m.

=== World War II and reconstruction ===
The Gasometer sustained repeated bomb damage during World War II but remained operational. During an Allied artillery bombardment, the stored gas ignited without causing an explosion, allowing the pressure disc to descend gradually as the gas burned. Operations officially ceased on 31 December 1944. A fire during repairs on 10 June 1946 led to its complete disassembly, though reconstruction began in 1949 using the original pressure disc and roof. The Gasometer resumed operations by 1 June 1950.

=== Decommissioning and adaptive reuse ===
In 1977, the Gasometer underwent refurbishment at a cost of 3.5 million Deutsche Mark. By the late 1980s, declining demand for stored gas—due to the closure of coking plants and competition from cheaper natural gas—rendered the facility obsolete. Owned by Ruhrkohle AG, it was decommissioned in 1988.

Debates over its demolition or repurposing culminated in a 1992 Oberhausen City Council vote, which narrowly approved its acquisition (by a one-vote margin) for conversion into an exhibition space. This decision aligned with the development of the adjacent CentrO shopping mall and the Internationale Bauausstellung Emscher Park initiative. Ownership transferred to the city, with Ruhrkohle AG contributing 1.8 million Deutsche Mark to offset demolition cost savings.

=== Conversion to cultural venue ===
From 1993 to 1994, Deutsche Babcock AG oversaw the Gasometer's conversion. The pressure disc was permanently fixed at a height of 4.5 m, creating a 3000 m^{2} ground-level exhibition area. A primary exhibition space and 500-seat auditorium were installed atop the disc, while elevators and staircases provided access to a rooftop viewing platform. The renovation cost approximately 16 million Deutsche Mark.

== Exhibitions ==
=== Fire & Flame (1994–1995) ===
This exhibition documented the history of the coal and iron industry in the Ruhr area and its societal impact. It attracted approximately 460,000 visitors.

=== I Phoenix (1996) ===
A contemporary art exhibition, ''I Phoenix'' drew 96,000 attendees.

=== The Dream of Vision (1997) ===
Focusing on the history of television, this exhibition explored the medium's cultural and technological evolution.

=== Christo: The Wall (1999) ===
Organized as part of the International Building Exhibition (IBA) Emscher Park at a cost of nearly 4 million Deutsche Mark, this installation by Christo and Jeanne-Claude featured a 68-meter-wide, 26-meter-high stack of 13,000 multicolored oil barrels weighing 234,000 kg. It drew 390,000 visitors.

=== The Ball is Round (2000) ===
Celebrating the centenary of the German Football Association, the exhibition chronicled football history and attracted 216,000 visitors.

=== Blue Gold (2001-2002) ===
Exploring the theme of water, the exhibition included 833,000 kg of sand and featured an installation by Paul Schütze: a 50-meter-high water cone in an artificial lake accompanied by video projections.

=== Bill Viola: Five Angels for the Millennium (2003) ===
A video installation by Bill Viola, this exhibition received 140,000 visitors.

=== Wind of Hope (2004) ===
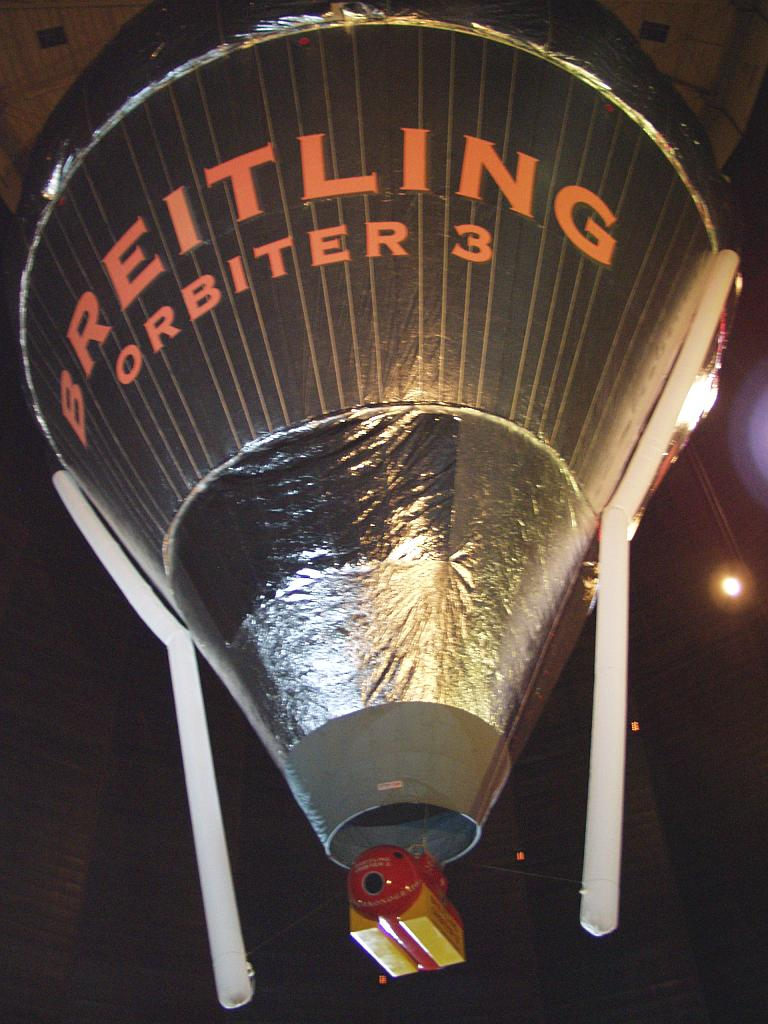
Breitling Orbiter 3 on display inside the Gasometer (2004)

Highlighting Brian Jones and Bertrand Piccard's 1999 circumnavigation by balloon, the display included their 55 metres (180 ft) tall Breitling Orbiter 3 balloon.

=== Fire Light Sky (2006) ===
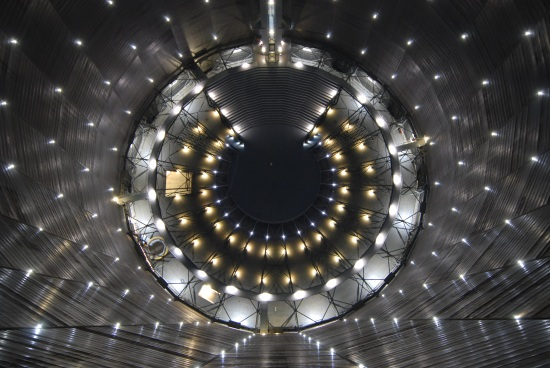
Light Sky by Christina Kubisch

Christina Kubisch's sound and light installation, combined with an exhibition on the Gasometer's history, merged sensory and historical narratives.

=== The Eye in the Sky (2007-2008) ===
Developed in collaboration with the DLR, the exhibition showcased large satellite imagery of Earth and space exploration artifacts, drawing 375,000 visitors.

=== Out of this World – Wonders of the Solar System (2009–2010) ===
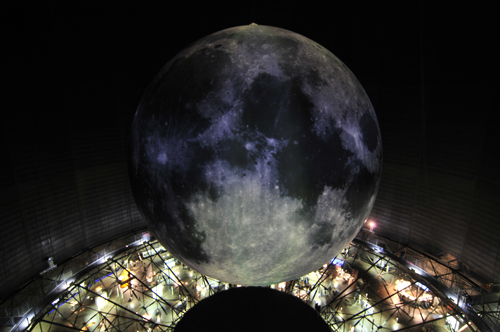
25m model of the Moon in "Out of this World"

Marking the International Year of Astronomy, this Ruhr.2010 project featured a 25-meter-diameter Moon model. It ran from 2 April 2009 to 30 December 2010 and attracted 950,000 visitors.

=== Magic Places (2011–2012) ===
Focusing on global natural and cultural monuments, the exhibition welcomed 800,000 attendees.

=== Christo: Big Air Package (2013) ===
One of Christo with Jeanne-Claude's final collaborative projects (16 March – 30 December 2013), this installation used 20,350 m^{2} of translucent fabric and 4,500 meters of rope to create a 90-meter-high, 50-meter-wide inflated structure pressurized at 27 pascals above ambient. Visitors entered via airlocks to explore the interior.

=== The Appearance of Beauty (2014–2015) ===
Displaying nearly 200 artworks, from the Venus de Milo to Steve McCurry's Afghan Girl, the exhibition attracted 480,000 visitors.

=== Wonders of Nature (2016-2017) ===
Featuring large-format photographs and a 20-meter-diameter Earth model with projected satellite imagery, this became the Gasometer's most-visited exhibition, with over 1.3 million attendees.

=== The Call of the Mountains (2018-2019) ===
Collaborating with the German Aerospace Center, the exhibition explored mountain ecosystems and geology. A 17-meter inverted Matterhorn model, suspended 100 meters high, served as a projection surface for climbing routes and time-lapse visuals.

=== The Fragile Paradise (2021-2023) ===
Highlighting humanity's impact on nature during the Anthropocene, the exhibition used award-winning photographs and videos to trace Earth's climatic history.

=== Planet Ocean (2024) ===
This exhibition explored marine ecosystems. Its centerpiece, "The Wave," was a 40-meter-tall digital installation by Austria's Ars Electronica, simulating underwater environments with life-sized marine creatures.

=== Forest Worlds (2026–2027) ===
Opening in March 2026, this exhibition offers a look into the forests of our planet. Nearly half a million visitors saw the exhibition in the first six months alone.
