= Datteln-Hamm Canal =

Coordinates: 51°37′51″N 7°36′31″E

- Interactive map of Datteln-Hamm Canal

Specifications
- Length: 47.2 km (29 mi)

Geography
- Start point: Dortmund-Ems Canal at Datteln, Germany
- End point: Hamm, Germany

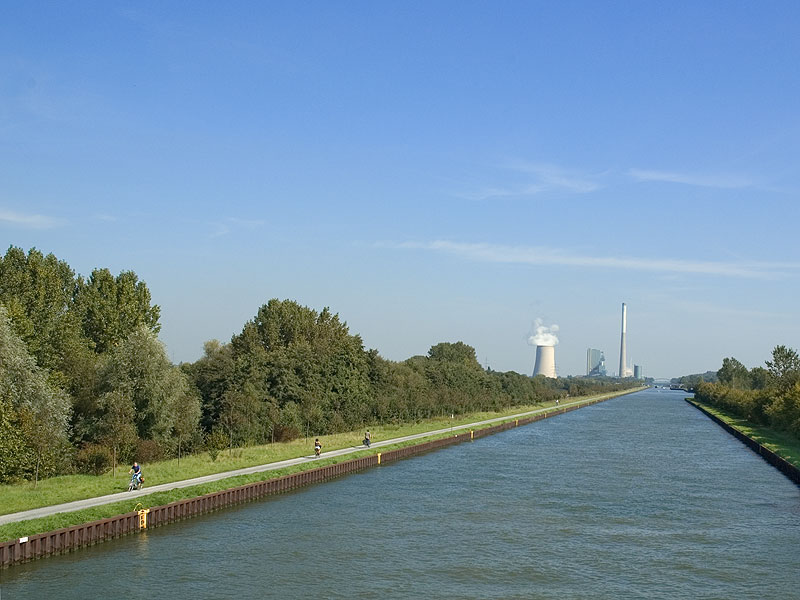
The Datteln-Hamm Canal at Bergkamen

The Datteln-Hamm Canal (German: Datteln-Hamm-Kanal) is a canal in the German state of North Rhine-Westphalia. It links the Dortmund-Ems Canal at Datteln to the city of Hamm, ending at the Kraftwerk Westfalen power station near the Lippe river.

The canal is 47.2 kilometres (29.3 mi) long and has two locks, at Hamm and Werries, with a total rise of 6.8 metres (22 ft). In Hamm a water exchange facility of the Wasserverband Westdeutsche Kanäle is located that feeds the waterway with water out of the river Lippe to compensate evaporation, infiltration and operation of locks. When the water level of the river Lippe falls below a flow rate of 10 m³/second, water out of the Datteln-Hamm Canal is pumped into the Lippe and the canal receives water via pumps from the Ruhr and Rhine.

== History ==
Canal was constructed between 1906 and 1914 for heavily industrialized area. It has given a commercial navigation. It's one of the most important canals in Germany.
