= Emschergenossenschaft =

- Abbreviation: EG
- Formation: 1899 in Bochum
- Type: Statutory authority in public-private partnership
- Legal status: Nonprofit organization
- Purpose: River basin management in the Emscher catchment
- Headquarters: Germany, 45128 Essen, Kronprinzenstraße 24
- Chief Executive Officer: Prof. Dr. Uli Paetzel
- Chief Operating Officer: Dr. Frank Obenaus
- Affiliations: Joint administration with Lippeverband
- Website: https://www.eglv.de

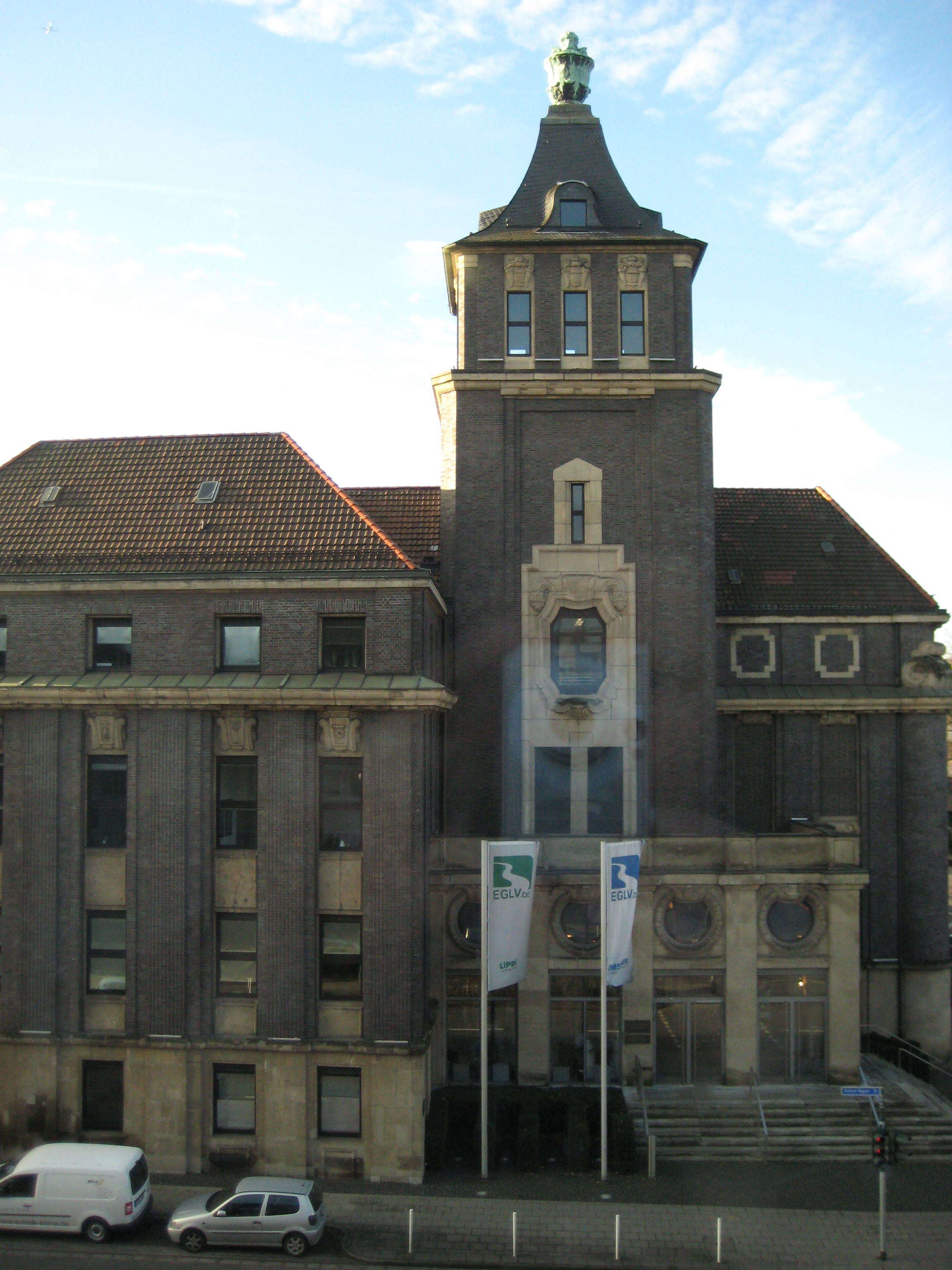
Headquarter of The Emschergenossenschaft in Essen (Germany), constructed 1910 by Prof. Wilhelm Kreis

The Emschergenossenschaft is the oldest and biggest public German water board, („Wasserwirtschaftsverband”) located in Essen (North Rhine-Westphalia/Germany) and responsible for the 865 km^{2} Emscher catchment with 2.2 million citizens. In Europe's largest urban area, between Dortmund and Duisburg as well as in the northern perimeter of the Lippe region, The Emschergenossenschaft offers modern, cost-effective water management that covers a broad range of responsibilities as sewage treatment, care and maintenance of waterways, natural remodelling of open waste water canals, flood protection, regulation of water flow and management of groundwater and rainwater

== History ==
=== Origins and early development ===
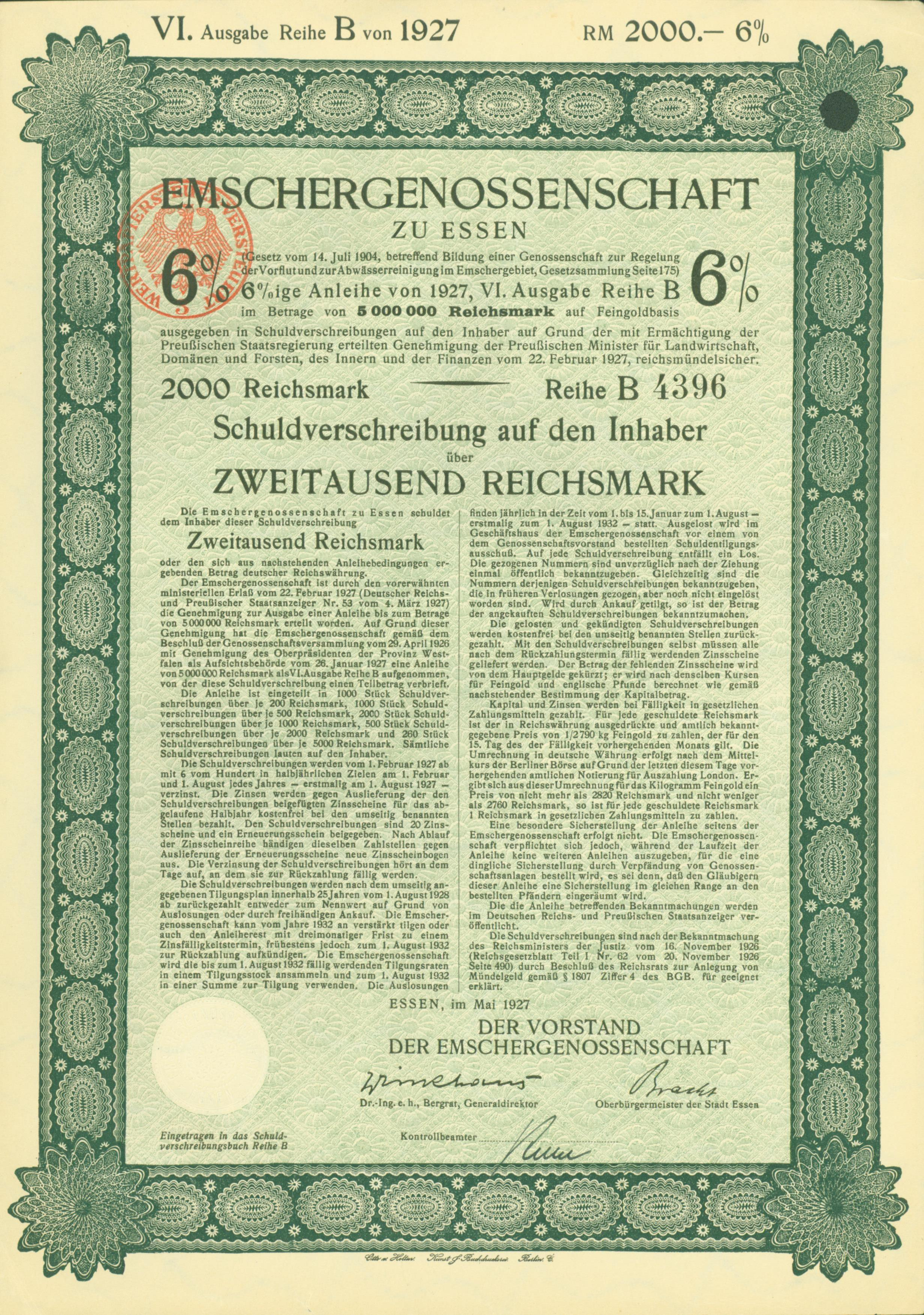
Bond of the Emschergenossenschaft, issued May 1927

Until the start of industrialization in the Ruhr region from the middle of the 19th century, the Emscher was a meandering lowland river around 109 km long, which was also dammed by many weirs on its tributaries and in the partly branched main stream. These generated the necessary water pressure for the operation of the mills and were used for fish farming. As a result, the land along the Emscher was fertile, but settlements directly next to the river were not possible or were in constant danger of being flooded. The entire Emscher zone was also a little-noticed "outlying district" for the state administrations, as the administrative district borders were located here (corresponding to the historical borders between the Rhineland and Westphalia) due to the establishment in 1815/1816

- the administrative district of Münster from Münster Abbey and Vest Recklinghausen

- the administrative district of Arnsberg with the territories of Sauerland and Siegerland (which received Arnsberg as the "Catholic capital" and

- the administrative district of Düsseldorf with the northern Rhine provinces

The Emscher zone was not mapped until 1822 to 1835. The Emscher also had hardly any bridges or crossing facilities for a long time; the first north–south road link between the present-day cities of Recklinghausen and Herne, for example, was not built until 1842. When coal mining moved north from the Ruhr to the then sparsely populated Emscher in the 1960s, problems were inevitable: As a result of mining areas above ground sank, and subsidence swamps formed. The wastewater from mining and the smelting works, but also from the settlements, collected here and putrefied: the population of the Emscher towns increased rapidly in the 19th century. In 1818, cities such as Essen and Dortmund had less than 5,000 inhabitants; in 1910, Essen registered 294,653 and Dortmund 214,226 people. Since 1883, drafts and commissions had been discussing how to solve the drainage emergency. The quantities of water pumped over from the Ruhr Valley as drinking water did not alleviate the problem, as the Ruhr water was also hygienically questionable and, together with the drainage emergency, led to a typhoid epidemic in Gelsenkirchen in 1901, in which 350 people died. As a result, Robert Koch founded the "Hygiene Institute of the Ruhr" here in 1901.

The founding meeting of the Emschergenossenschaft took place on December 14, 1899. The Emschergenossenschaft was self-governing from the outset; the state was not directly involved, but only had influence through legislation and building permits. Any costs incurred were distributed proportionately among those responsible for wastewater or construction measures, i.e. mining, trade and industry as well as cities and municipalities (as representatives of the citizens). The plan drawn up by government architect Wilhelm Middeldorf in 1901 "for the regulation of the receiving water and wastewater treatment in the Emscher region" predicted mining-related disruptions for the next 50 years with an assumed mining depth of up to 1,000 m. On July 14, 1904, the Emschergenossenschaftsgesetz (Emscher Cooperative Act) was confirmed by Prussian King Wilhelm II and later served as a model for the establishment of other water management associations.

From 1906, the Emscher was lowered from Dortmund to the Rhine, straightened and diked. As subsidence of up to 10 meters was already expected for the natural estuary in Duisburg-Hamborn ("Alte Emscher"), the mouth of the Emscher was relocated from Oberhausen to Duisburg-Walsum ("Kleine Emscher") in 1906; in 1949, the mouth was relocated a second time to Dinslaken. With the completion of construction work in this estuary delta in 2018, the Emscher will be relocated for a third time to the Voerd city area. The first section from Herne to Duisburg was completed between 1906 and 1910, while the section from Herne to Dortmund was finished in 1914. At the same time, sewage treatment plants and pumping stations were built.

The aim of the Emscher expansion was to restore a natural gradient so that the water could flow into the Rhine. To achieve this, the original 109 km long course of the Emscher was freed from many "loops" or it was partially laid parallel to the old river bed: In the Herne/Herten area, for example, the Emscher has been in the bed of its former tributary Fleuthe since 1914, because at the same time as the first Emscher expansion, the Rhine-Herne Canal was built over a total length of 46 km and partly laid in the former Emscher riverbed. Today, the course of the Emscher is only 81 km long between its source in Holzwickede and where it flows into the Rhine. Just 10 years after construction began, 5,000 hectares of land had been freed from flooding and 2,000 hectares of previously marshy land were now dry and usable. Typhus, malaria and other epidemics had almost completely disappeared. From 1906, the Emschergenossenschaft rapidly expanded the network of sewage treatment plants. In 1908, around 220,000 inhabitants were already connected to cooperative sewage treatment plants, 3 years later there were already over 700,000 people and 19 plants (1 cubic meter of water cost 0.34 pfennigs to purify at that time). At the beginning of the First World War, the Emschergenossenschaft had already created capacities for almost 1 million people; by 1932, 2 million people were connected.

The cleaning costs here were on average around 20% per inhabitant compared to the usual level in large German cities. The citizens used the sewage sludge drying sites to extract the "Emscher fuel" mixed with coal dust, as the sewage sludge had almost the same calorific value as brown coal. The increasing problems with the lack of gradient in the streams, which arose again and again due to the subsidence caused by mining, were solved in many places by pumping stations.

=== Later development ===
Over time, it often became economically and technically easier not to pump the wastewater to a local sewage treatment plant in a mining subsidence area, but to route it to a central sewage treatment plant for several towns via the open, concrete-lined streams. By the end of the 1920s, the Emschergenossenschaft operated 30 sewage treatment plants. With the construction of the Emscher river sewage treatment plant at the mouth of the Boye in Bottrop in 1927 and the increasing number of pumping stations due to constant subsidence, wastewater treatment shifted to a centrally organized network. In the 1970s, Europe's largest and most modern sewage treatment plant was built at the mouth of the Emscher in Dinslaken, which was relocated in 1949, while the old mouths of the Emscher in Duisburg were treated biologically from 1965 and 1988 respectively. With the inauguration of the new Dortmund-Deusen wastewater treatment plant in 1994 and the Bottrop wastewater treatment plant in 1997, the entire wastewater in the catchment area is treated biologically in conjunction with the Emschermündung wastewater treatment plant. In addition, there are the tributaries Kleine and Alte Emscher, which are disposed of via a joint wastewater treatment plant, as well as a hospital wastewater treatment plant at the Marienhospital in Gelsenkirchen. The Emschergenossenschaft forms an administrative unit with the Lippeverband, which was founded in 1926. Together, these two associations are the largest water management association and wastewater disposal company in Germany.

Due to the northward migration of the coal mining industry, subsidence has almost come to a standstill. The Emschergenossenschaft can therefore "rebuild" the drainage system, i.e. the former streams are gradually freed from wastewater, which then flows into the treatment plants in underground pipes. The streams can then be redesigned and "renaturalized". The first project was started in 1982 with the Dellwiger Bach in Dortmund.

With the so-called water association decision of 5 December 2002, the Federal Constitutional Court strengthened the special organizational form of "functional self-administration" specific to the Emschergenossenschaft and other water associations (BVerfG, decision of 5 December 2002 - 2 BvL 5 and 6/98). The reasoning stated that outside of direct state administration, in defined areas such as water management, special organizational forms of municipal self-administration are permissible for the performance of public tasks, especially as they are compatible with the democratic principle of the Basic Law in Article 20 (para. 2).

The near-natural conversion of the Emscher system is the main task of the present and the future. This intergenerational project was initiated with the International Building Exhibition Emscherpark (1989–1999). In the planned and budgeted period from 1992 to 2021, the entire Emscher system was rebuilt at a cost of €5.38 billion, with the aim of "first-time construction" for the main course of the Emscher. The Emscher sewer (AKE) is a prerequisite for the Emscher to be freed of wastewater and for the near-natural conversion of the watercourses. The planning and construction of the canal, with depths of up to 40 meters, was a masterpiece of engineering. The ground-breaking ceremony for the Emscher sewer was held on September 11, 2009. The AKE is 51 kilometers long and stretches from Dortmund-Deusen to Dinslaken. Due to its gradient of 1.5 per thousand, it requires three pumping stations on its way west, namely Gelsenkirchen, Bottrop and Oberhausen/Duisburg. The entire system was commissioned by the Emschergenossenschaft at the end of 2021.

The consequences of mining are irreversible, so the need for pumping - i.e. to keep the settlement areas dry - remains permanent. These so-called perpetual costs are borne by the RAG-Stiftung. Challenges for water management arise from the signs of climate change and legal changes at state, federal and EU level. The long-term increase in local heavy rainfall events can be statistically proven by the Emschergenossenschaft, as precipitation data has been collected throughout the catchment area since its foundation. In this respect, projects and campaigns on rainwater management with the "Future Agreement on Rainwater" and European network projects such as "SIC adapt!" or dynaklim as part of the Climate Train network are attempting to develop strategies to cope with the consequences of climate change. However, this has not been able to prevent flooding from local heavy rainfall events in the catchment area almost every year from the municipal sewage system or from exceeding the volumes of retention basins.

Challenges continue to arise from so-called micropollutants, which have been present in wastewater for some time but are increasingly detectable thanks to ever-improving analytical methods. These include for example drug residues. Since 2011, the Emschergenossenschaft has been operating the world's only hospital wastewater treatment plant that can remove a large proportion of drug residues from wastewater using various treatment technologies and is then allowed to discharge them into a stream.

== Responsibilities ==
Responsibilities and tasks of the Emschergenossenschaft are defined in the act „Emschergenossenschaftsgesetz“ (Emscher GG), enacted July 14, 1904 and adapted until 2013:

- Management of runoff, flood prevention at open water courses and in the sub catchments;
- Maintenance of open water courses and related facilities;
- Ecological restoration of technically altered water courses;
- Groundwater management;
- Compensation of mining impacts on ecological or water management related changes;
- Waste water disposal;
- Waste disposal of waste from water management services;
- Water quality management;
- Scientific work related to water management challenges;
- Support of drinking water supply, water for industrial use and use of hydropower

The Emschergenossenschaft is working in an administrative collectivity with the Lippeverband, a water board established in 1926 in a neighboring river catchment area. Together, more than 1500 employees work for both water boards, around 900 of them belong to the Emschergenossenschaft. Both public water boards together are the biggest water management and service provider in Germany.

== Governance ==
The tasks are regulated in the Emschergenossenschaftsgesetz (Emscher Cooperative Act) and the articles of association and rules of procedure. The bodies of the associations are the cooperative/association assembly, the cooperative/association council and the executive board. The association assemblies are the highest decision-making body and are made up of representatives of the members (delegates). The Emscher Cooperative Council is elected by the respective Association Assembly. The Cooperative and Association Council elects the executive board and appoints a member of the executive board as chairperson.

The current members of the executive board are Ulrich Paetzel (chairman and board member for Strategy and Finance), Frank Obenaus (Board Member for Water Management and Technology) and Dorothea Voss (Board Member for Human Resources and Sustainability). The former heads of the association: Wilhelm Middeldorf (1905 to 1911), Heinrich Helbing (1911 to 1933), Alexander Ramshorn (1934 to 1958), Erich Knop (1958 to 1974) since Wolfgang Türstig left 62 J to Gunther Annen (1974 to 1991) and Jochen Stemplewski (1992 to 2016).

In 2015, the appeal procedure against decisions by public bodies was reintroduced. Some of the appeal committees are elected by the respective association assembly, while others are appointed directly by the supervisory authority. The supervisory authority is the Ministry of the Environment, Agriculture, Nature Conservation and Consumer Protection, which is responsible for water management in the state of North Rhine-Westphalia.

The delegate assemblies are reconstituted every five years. The newly elected delegates then appoint the members of the Cooperative Council and the Association Council and, in some cases, the members of the Appeals Committees. Multiple terms of office are permitted for all committee members.

== Catchment area ==
The Emschergenossenschaft is working in the 865 km^{2} catchment area of the Emscher with the municipalities (from east to west)

- Holzwickede
- Dortmund
- Small parts of Witten, Waltrop and Lünen
- Castrop-Rauxel
- Recklinghausen
- Herten
- Herne
- Bochum
- Essen
- Mülheim
- Gelsenkirchen
- Gladbeck
- Bottrop
- Oberhausen
- Duisburg
- Dinslaken
- Voerde

The catchment is historically divided since cutting the Emscher main stream from its original estuary twice, first in 1906 from the original mouth in Duisburg and 1949 again by shifting the mouth to Dinslaken. The former parts of the catchment area in Duisburg and Oberhausen are drained artificially and the waste water is – after treatment – pumped into the river Rhine. These sub catchments are called “Alte Emscher” and “Kleine Emscher”. The third shift of the Emscher mouth (under construction) has been leading to the municipality of Voerde as a new member in the Emschergenossenschaft.

== Data ==
- Members of the Emschergenossenschaft: 201
- Catchment area: 865 km^{2}
- Population: approx. 2.2 Mio.
- Water courses: 353 km
- Waste water sewers: 426 km
- Dykes: 117 km
- Waste water treatment plants: 5 (in total 4.8 Mio. people equivalents)
- Pumping stations: 206
- Part of catchment area drained by pumps (polder areas): 37.8%
- Flood plains: 23
