= Datteln =

- Town
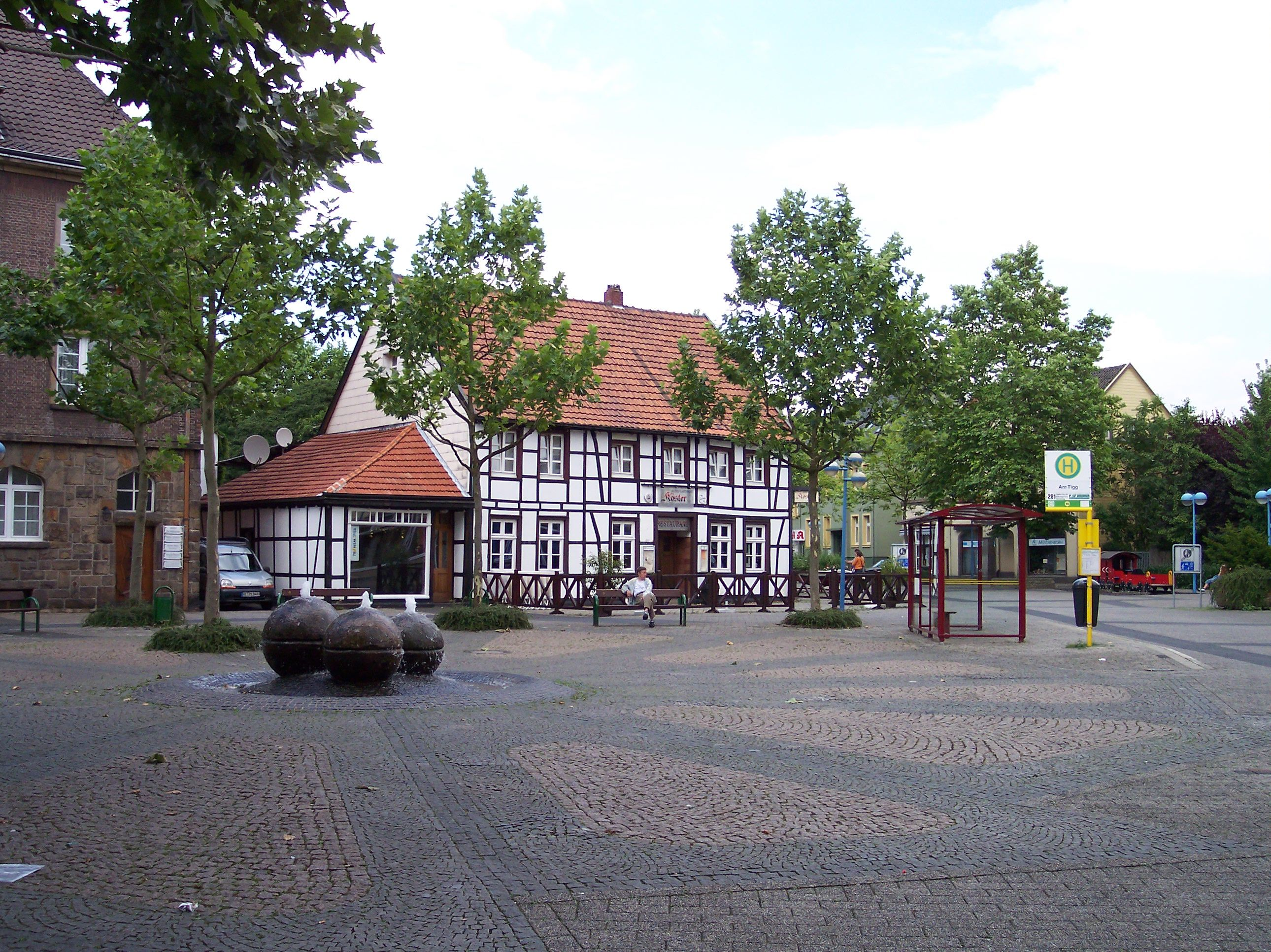

- Coat of arms

- Location of Datteln within Recklinghausen district
- Interactive map of Datteln
- Location within Germany Location within North Rhine-Westphalia
- Coordinates: 51°39′14″N 7°20′30″E
- Country: Germany
- State: North Rhine-Westphalia
- Admin. region: Münster
- District: Recklinghausen
- Subdivisions: 2

Government
  - Mayor (2020–25): André Dora (SPD)

Area
  - Total: 66.1 km^{2} (25.5 sq mi)
- Elevation: 49 m (161 ft)

Population (2025-12-31)
  - Total: 34,972
  - Density: 529/km^{2} (1,370/sq mi)
- Time zone: UTC+01:00 (CET)
  - Summer (DST): UTC+02:00 (CEST)
- Postal codes: 45711
- Dialling codes: 0 23 63
- Vehicle registration: RE
- Website: www.datteln.de

Datteln (German pronunciation: [ˈdatl̩n]) is a town in the district of Recklinghausen, in North Rhine-Westphalia, Germany. It is situated on the biggest canal junction in the world, where the Datteln-Hamm Canal, Wesel-Datteln Canal, Dortmund-Ems Canal, and Rhein-Herne Canal intersect. It lies approximately 10 km north-east of Recklinghausen and 20 km north-west of Dortmund.

Katja Seizinger, retired ski racing champion and triple Olympic gold medalist, was born in Datteln.

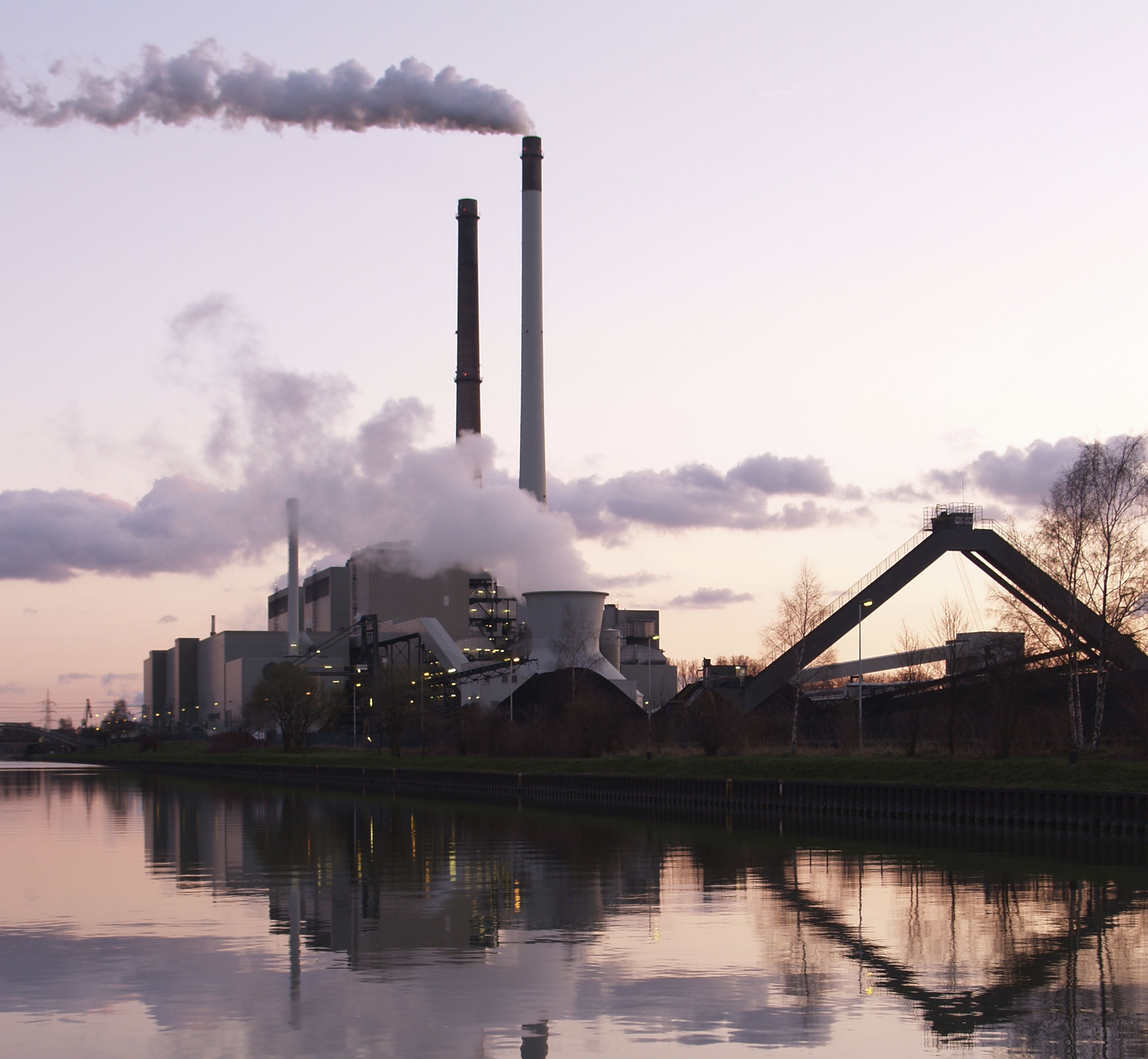
Coal power plant Datteln 1-3

== Population ==
Historical population

Year	Pop.	±% p.a.
1965	35,723	—
1970	37,807	+1.14%
1975	38,053	+0.13%
1980	37,180	−0.46%
1985	36,197	−0.53%
1990	36,876	+0.37%
1995	37,712	+0.45%

Year	Pop.	±% p.a.
2000	37,293	−0.22%
2005	36,571	−0.39%
2010	35,513	−0.59%
2015	34,521	−0.57%
2020	34,714	+0.11%
2025	34,972	+0.15%

Source: Landesdatabank Nordrhein-Westfalen

== Notable people ==
- Horst Niggemeier (1929–2000), politician, mayor of Datteln
- Reinhard Lettmann (1933–2013), bishop of Münster (1980–2008)
- Egon Ramms (born 1948), General, 2007–2010 commander at NATO
- Klaus Eberhard (born 1957), director of Sport of German Tennis Federation and former tennis player
- Ingo Anderbrügge (born 1964), football player and coach
- Katja Seizinger (born 1972), World Cup alpine ski racing champion; three times the Sportswoman of the Year
- Dunja Hayali (born 1974), journalist and television presenter
- Charlotte Becker (born 1983), cyclist
- Kevin Ratajczak (born 1985), co lead singer of Electronicore band Electric Callboy
- Lukas Nottbeck (born 1988), footballer
- Sarah Petrausch (born 1990), volleyball player
- Elijah Blum (born 1996), professional wrestler
- Dominik Steinmann (born 1997), darts player
- Phil Harres (born 2002), footballer

== Twin towns – sister cities ==
Datteln is twinned with:

- Cannock Chase, England, United Kingdom
- Genthin, Germany
