= Rhine–Herne Canal =

Transportation canal in Germany

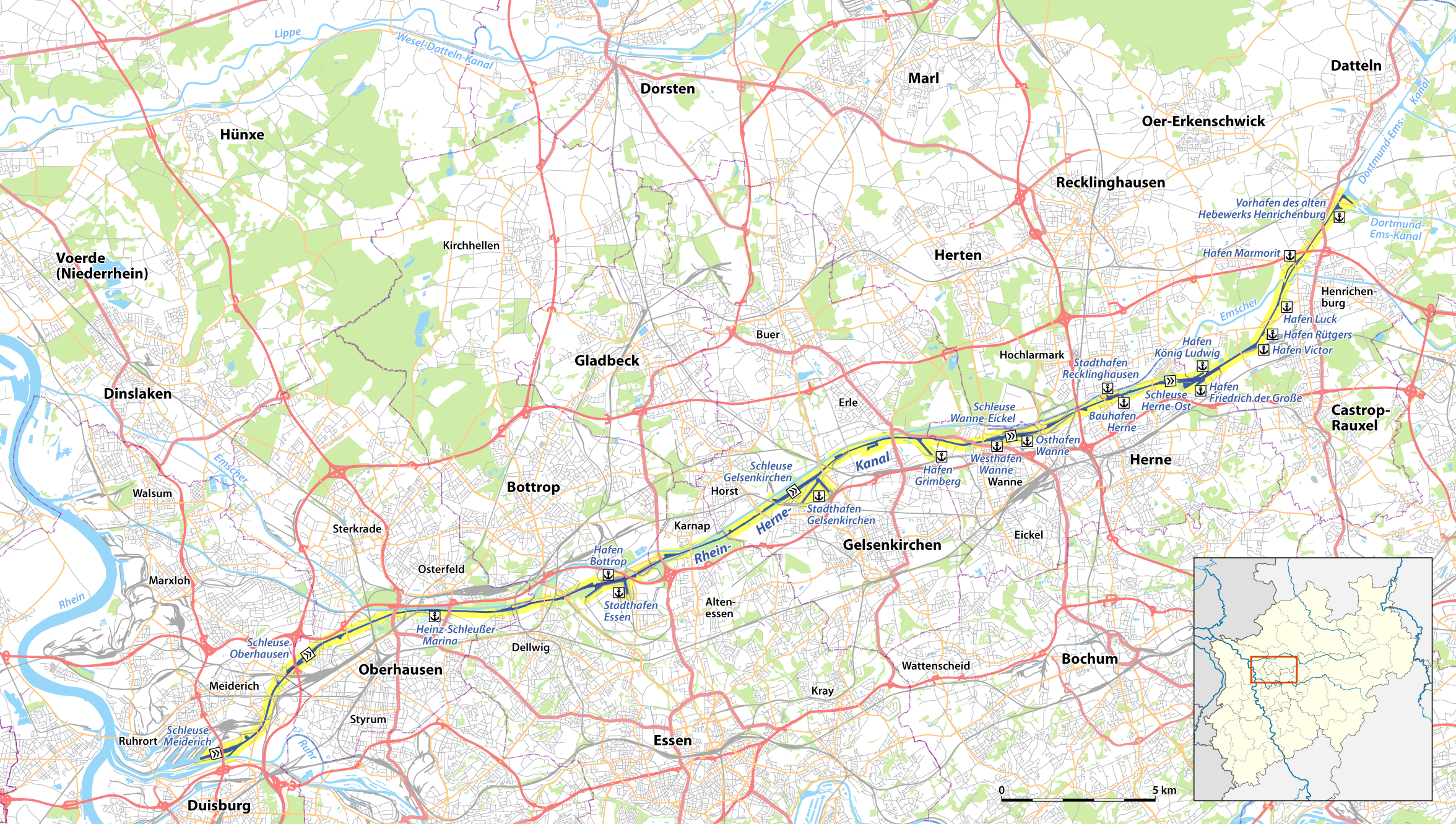
- Map of the Rhine–Herne Canal
- Interactive map of Rhine–Herne Canal

Specifications
- Length: 45.6 km (28 mi)

History
- Construction began: 1906
- Date completed: 1914

Geography
- Start point: Rhine at Duisburg, Germany
- End point: Dortmund-Ems Canal near Henrichenburg, Germany
- Beginning coordinates: 51°26′59″N 6°46′1″E
- Ending coordinates: 51°37′1″N 7°19′19″E

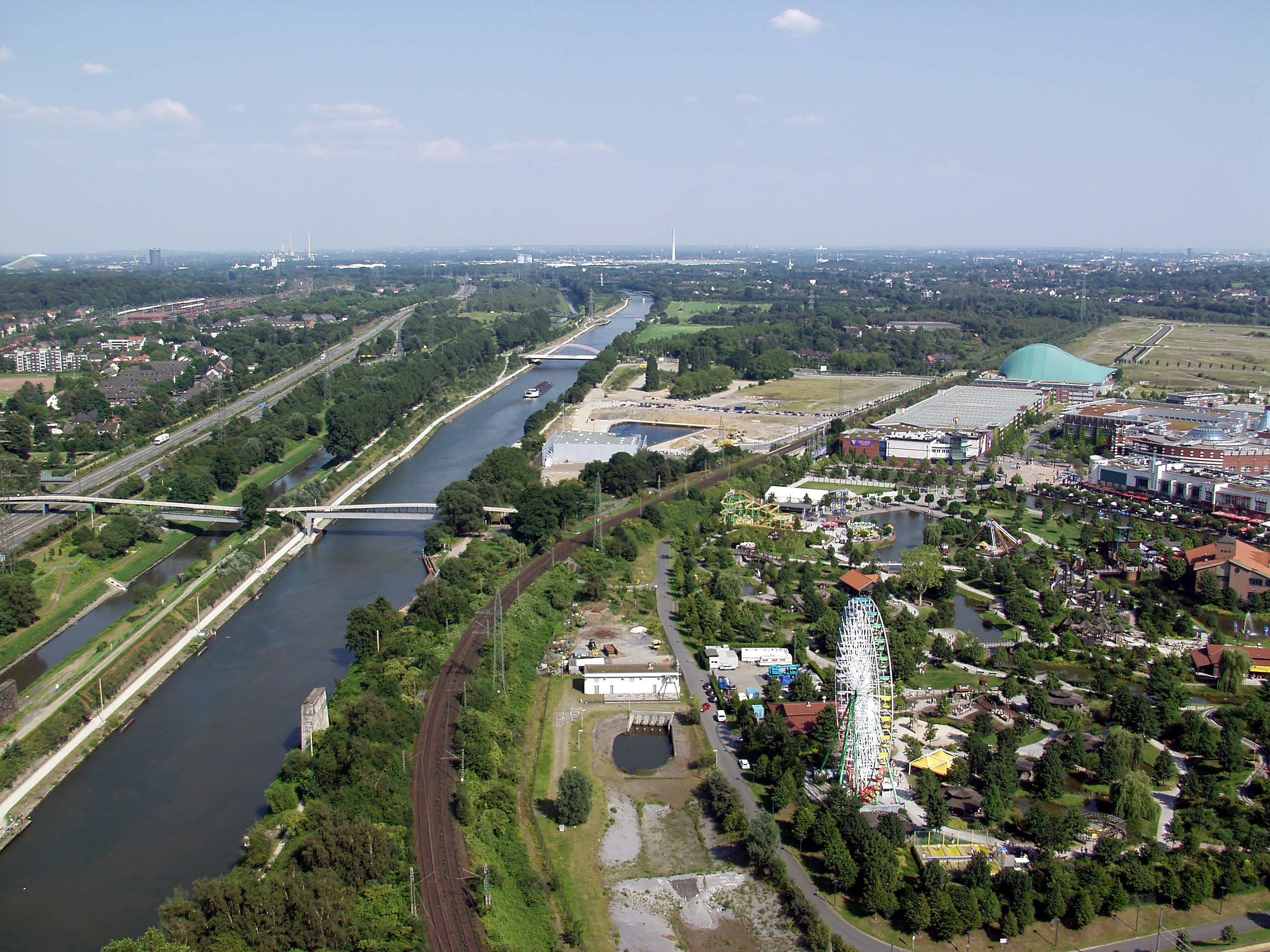
View from the Gasometer Oberhausen

The Rhine–Herne Canal (German: Rhein-Herne-Kanal) is a 45.6-kilometre-long (28.3 mi) transportation canal in the Ruhr area of North Rhine-Westphalia, Germany, with five canal locks. The canal was built over a period of eight years (5 April 1906 – 14 July 1914) and connects the harbour in Duisburg on the Rhine (51°26′59″N 6°46′1″E) with the Dortmund-Ems Canal near Henrichenburg (51°37′1″N 7°19′19″E), following the valley of the Emscher. It was widened in the 1980s. The Rhein-Herne canal ship was designed specifically for this canal; normally of about 1300–1350 ton capacity, it has a maximum draft of 2.50 metres (8.2 ft), a length of approximately 80 metres (260 ft), and maximum beam of 9.50 metres (31.2 ft).

Originally the Rhine-Herne canal ended in Herne, where it met a branch of the Dortmund-Ems-Kanal running from Henrichenburg to Herne, the intersection situated just above the East Herne lock.

After the closure of the last part of the Henrichenburg to Herne canal, the Henrichenburg-Herne section of the Dortmund-Ems was added to the Rhein-Herne Canal.

== Water system ==
The distribution of water in the canal is realised through five pump stations. Located at Duisburg-Meiderich, Oberhausen, Gelsenkirchen, Wanne-Eickel and East Herne, they pump water from the Rhine into the canal at each stage. As well as this, water from the Lippe river to the east is brought in through the Datteln-Hamm Canal.

== Locks ==
=== Duisburg-Meiderich sluicegate ===
In 1980, the current sluice gate was completed, including a 24-metre-high (79 ft) under-gate and control platform, which has now become a visible yellow landmark in the Ruhr landscape. The intended harbour of the old lock is today underwater and part of the foundations of the canal walls. This harbour was meant to be a possible spot for the eventual significant reconstruction of the lock, but it was never used for this purpose.

A possible reconstruction of the sluice gate was commissioned in 1914 with the canal opening. Instead of the old sluice of 165 metres (541 ft) in length and 10 metres (33 ft) in breadth a new sluice chamber with a usable length of 190 metres (620 ft) and a breadth of 12 metres (39 ft) were commissioned, so that bigger ships with lighters (barges) as specified in Euro class II can pass through the sluice gates.

== Ports ==
=== Duisburg ===
The canal begins in Duisburg along with the Schifffahrtskanal; connected to land by three bays of the Kanalhafen, and to the rest of the world via the Rhine.

The Rhine–Herne Canal headquarters is in the Meiderich district of Duisburg, it serves as the water and shipping management canal and its locks from Essen to Herne. From here maintenance and repair work are organised and performed.

=== Oberhausen marina ===
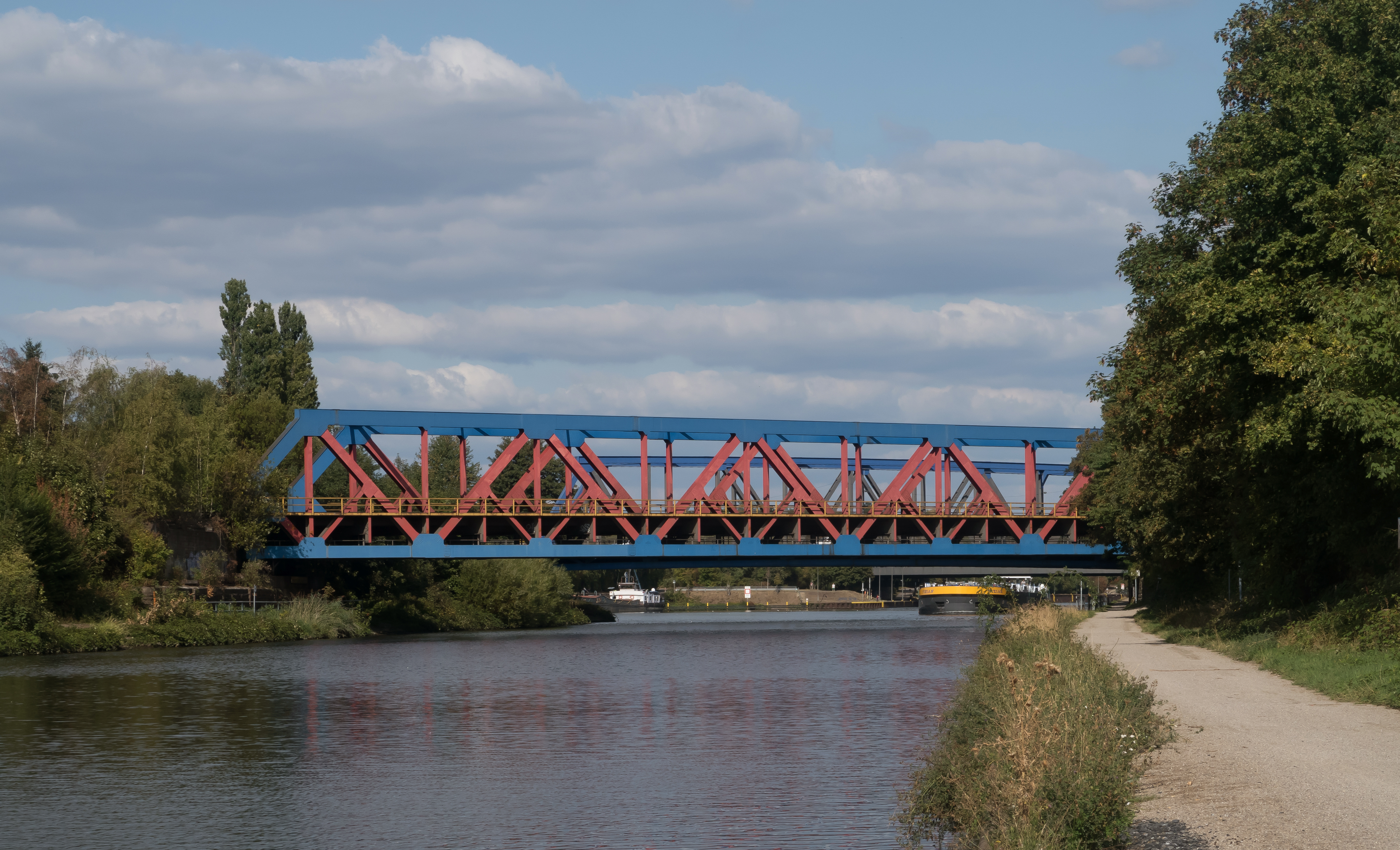
Railway bridge across the canal near Oberhausen

The Oberhausen marina is a yacht port opened in 2004 in close proximity to the CentrO shopping centre. The port has a water depth of 2.5 metres (8.2 ft) and over 13 bridges. Also at the Oberhausen marina are the attractions Sealife Oberhausen and Oberhausen Modellbahn World.

=== City port of Essen ===
The Stadthafen Essen (City port of Essen) is the youngest port on the Rhine–Herne Canal opened in 1934 by the city of Essen, and operated since 1987 by Stadtwerke Essen.

The port consists of a doubled sided canal side quay together with a harbour port at right angles onto the canal, which together form a water area of 63,000 square metres (680,000 ft^{2}) with associated dock-land of 300,000 square metres (3,200,000 ft^{2}) The dock handles bulk goods such as solid mineral fuels, petroleum and chemical products, stone, earth and iron and steel as well as recyclable materials, and is an important transhipment point.

=== City port of Gelsenkirchen ===
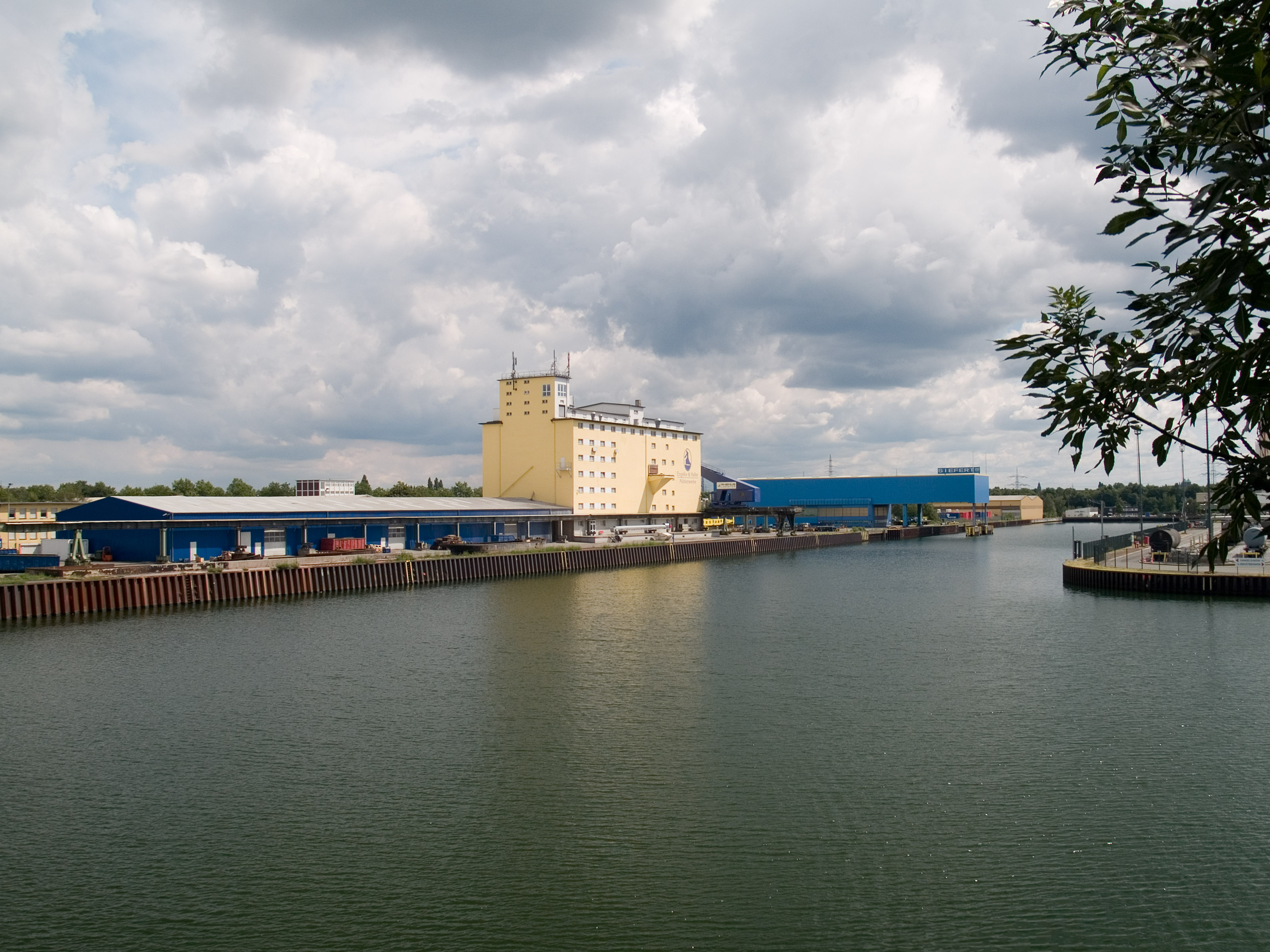
The port of Gelsenkirchen

The port of the city of Gelsenkirchen (Stadthafen Gelsenkirchen) was opened in July 1914 and is the oldest port on the Rhine–Herne Canal.

The port has two docks branched from the canal situated just east of the lock at Gelsenkirchen and has a water surface of 117,800 square metres (1,268,000 ft^{2}). The industrial port is ~900 by 60 metres (2,950 by 200 ft) and the trading port ~500 by 75 metres (1,640 by 246 ft). A private railway of length 18.4 kilometres (11.4 mi) is operated which is linked to the tracks of the Deutsche Bahn.

Formerly the port dealt mainly with coal and mining products, now the port is a major hub for petroleum products and second-largest inland port for cereals in North Rhine-Westphalia. It is operated by the Gelsenkirchener Logistik-, Hafen- und Servicegesellschaft (Gelsenkirchener logistics, harbour and service company.) a subsidiary of Stadtwerke Gelsenkirchen.

=== Port Grimberg ===
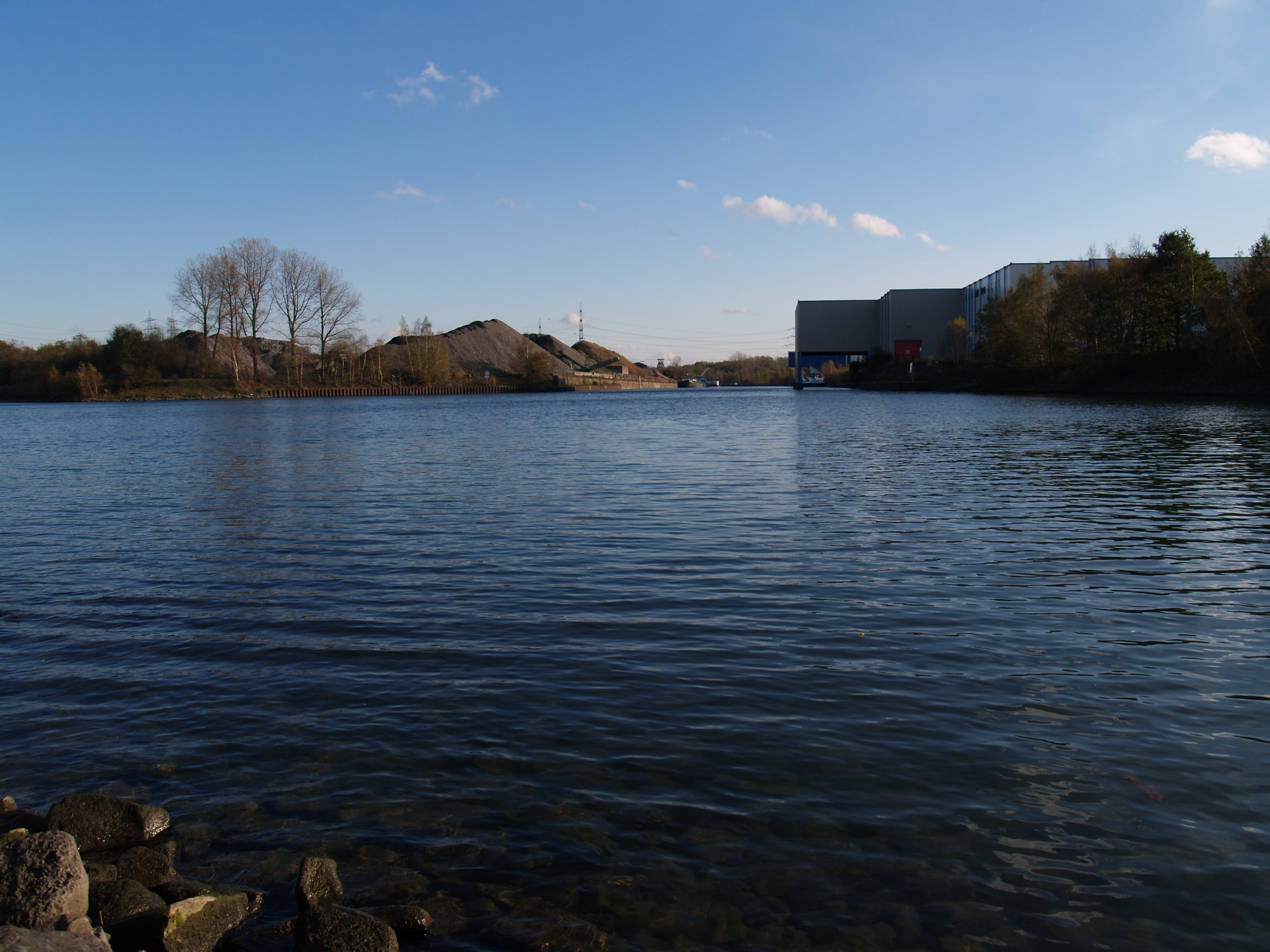
The port at Grimberg

Hafen Grimberg (Port Grimberg) is on the south canal bank in Gelsenkirchen, near the city boundary to Herne. It was named after the nearby Castle Grimberg, of which today only the foundations remain.

Built in 1914 by the Gelsenkirchener Bergwerks AG (GBAG) to provide a link to the GBAG mines of Rheinelbe, Alma and Pluto as well as supplying the ironworks of 'Schalker group' with imported ore. Around the same time, and up to 1929 the industrial railway of Erzbahn was built, serving the Schalker and Bochum group iron and steelworks. Between 1937 and 1968, Grimberg harbour was one of the major ports on the canal. In 1968, steel production at the southern end of the Erzbahn at Bochum ended, in 1982, the Schalker works closed – with this the use of the port for transport of iron ore ended. Such was the emphasis on iron ore that much of the port now stands empty, part of it nowadays is used for the processing of recycled materials for the building industry, as well as a storage facility.

=== Ports Wanne west and Wanne east ===
Like many other the port of Westhafen Wanne (Wanne west harbour) was originally built for the mutual benefit of the mines and canal, with a railway connecting the two. Today the quayside still has coal traffic and associated industries.

The docks of the port at Wanner West were filled in to make room for the Güterverkehrszentrum Emscher – a logistics (road, rail and river) centre working in association with other companies. The Wanne-Herner Eisenbahn und Hafen GmbH (WHE) operates both the remaining canal side docks and the associated railway.

The Osthafen Wanne (Port Wanne east) are also operated by the WHE; the ports and rail link serves a major scrap metal works.

=== City port of Recklinghausen ===
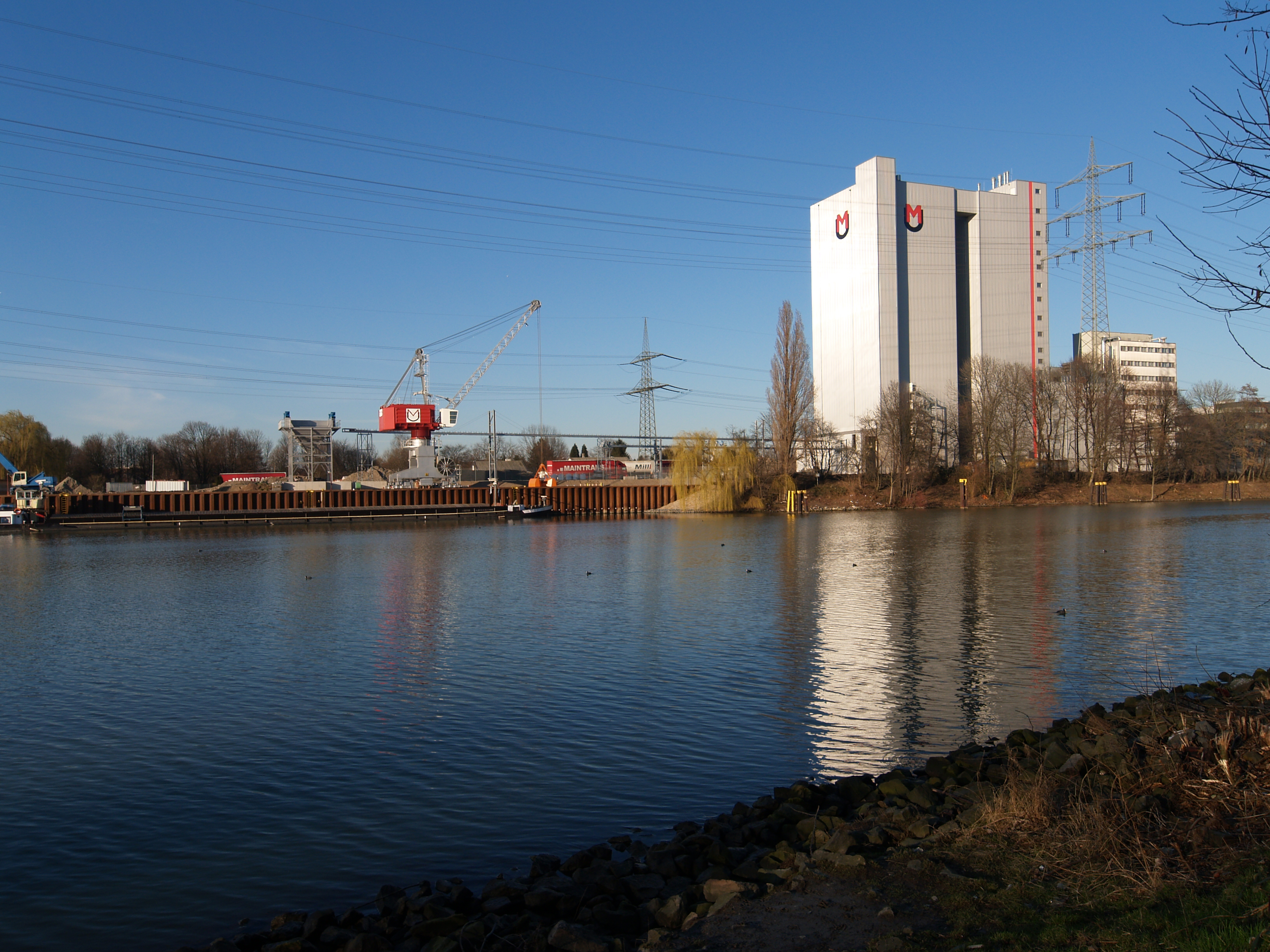
Recklinghausen port (2008) grain terminal

Originally the city of Recklinghausen had no access to the canal; through an exchange of land with the city of Herne the city gained access to the canal.

In recent decades, the port was abandoned. However through the actions of the company 'United Mills' grain shipments were made using a mobile crane. Since late 2007, the port has expanded and a grain loading plant installed: new mills and silos have been installed.

=== Port of the Frederick the Great mine ===
The Hafen der Zeche Friedrich der Große (Frederick the Great mine port) is directly south of the Port of the King Ludwig mine, as of 2009 the port is the site of an industrial estate named the Industriegebeit Friedrich der Große. The harbour which is cut parallel to the canal is still extant, but without fixed infrastructure, cranes etc.

=== Port of the King Ludwig mine ===
The Hafen der Zeche König Ludwig served the coal transported from, and deliveries to the former King Ludwig mine.

It is located at kilometer 38 of the canal, just upstream of the Herne Ost lock, on the north bank opposite the Hafen der Zeche Friedrich der Große (Frederick the Great mine port).

The 6,900-square-metre (1.7-acre) harbor basin was built from 1897 to 1898 when the section of the canal (the then branch channel of the Dortmund-Ems Canal), was already flooded. In 1912, at the colliery port handled 360,096 tons of goods. In 1913 the docks expanded. Because of mining subsidence by 1954 the quaywall had to be increased by 2.50 metres (8.2 ft).

In the 1980s, it was leased to Automobil- und Motorbootsport-Club Castrop-Rauxel e. V (The car and motorboat club of Castrop-Rauxel) and is used from recreational boating, being no longer used by Ruhrkohle AG, and contains many small boats. The former mine railway, which starts at the harbour is now a walking and biking trail.

=== Port Victor ===
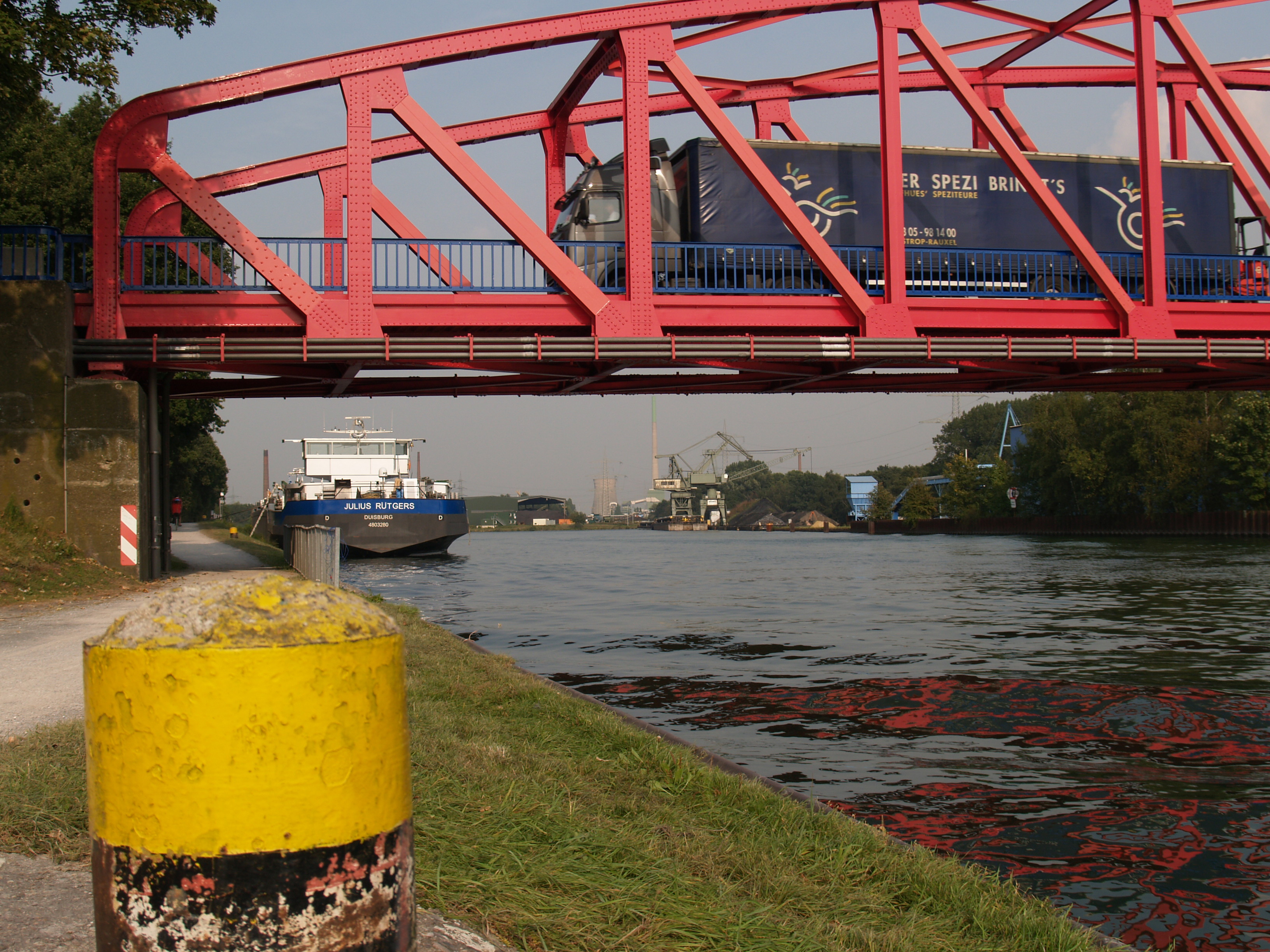
Looking east-northeast towards Port Victor on the Rhine-Herne Canal

The Victor Harbor (Hafen Victor) was created to serve the former colliery 'Victor' which finished all operations in 1973. The port is in the city of Castrop-Rauxel in the vicinity of Schloss Bladenhorst (Castle 'Blade Horst'), about 2 kilometres (1.2 mi) upstream from the Hafen der Zeche Friedrich der Große also on the south bank. Today the port still handles coal with the help of two gantry cranes.

=== Port Rütgers ===
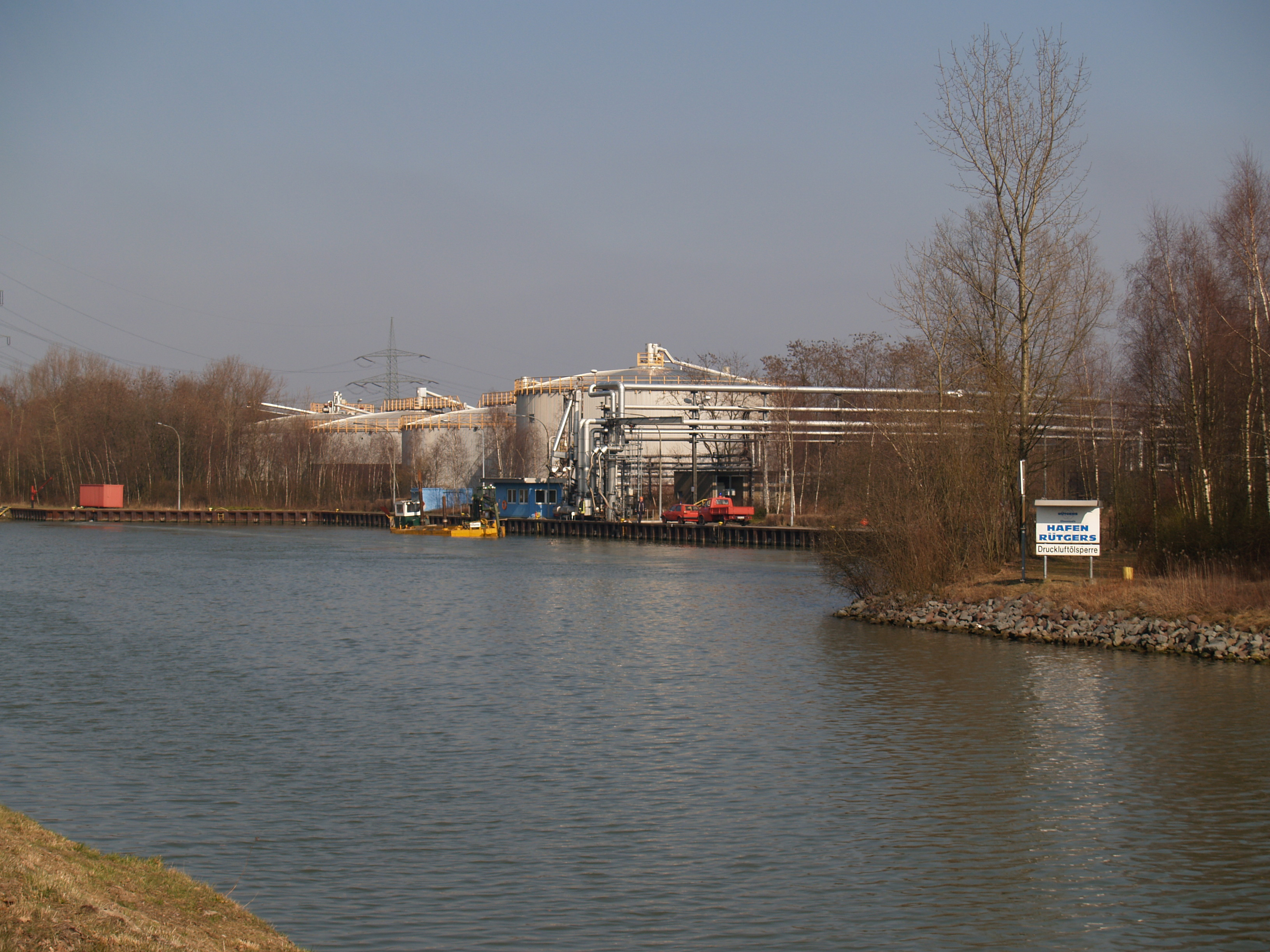
Looking east towards Port Rütgers

Port Rütgers (Hafen Rütgers) is the port of Rütgers Chemicals (founded by Julius Rütgers) and is about 500 metres (1,600 ft) upstream of the Port Victor on the east side of the canal after the canal makes a slight bend to the north. The main product dealt with here is pitch obtained from coal tar from the refining of coal. The port has a Pneumatic barrier.

=== Port Luck ===
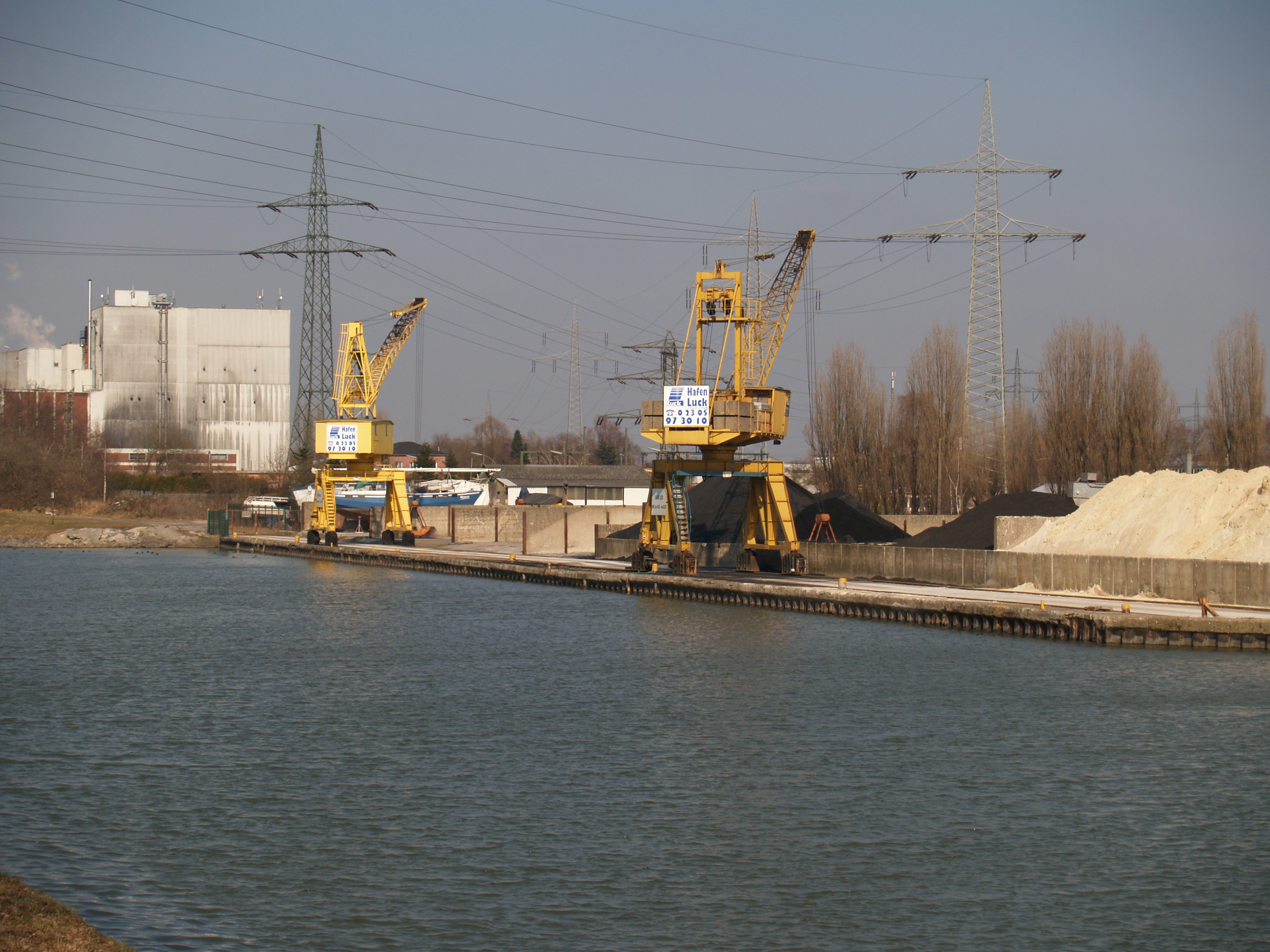
Port Luck

Port Luck (Hafen Luck) belongs to the construction and building materials company Luck located on the east bank, a little more than 2 kilometres upstream of Rütgers Chemicals.

=== Port Marmorit ===
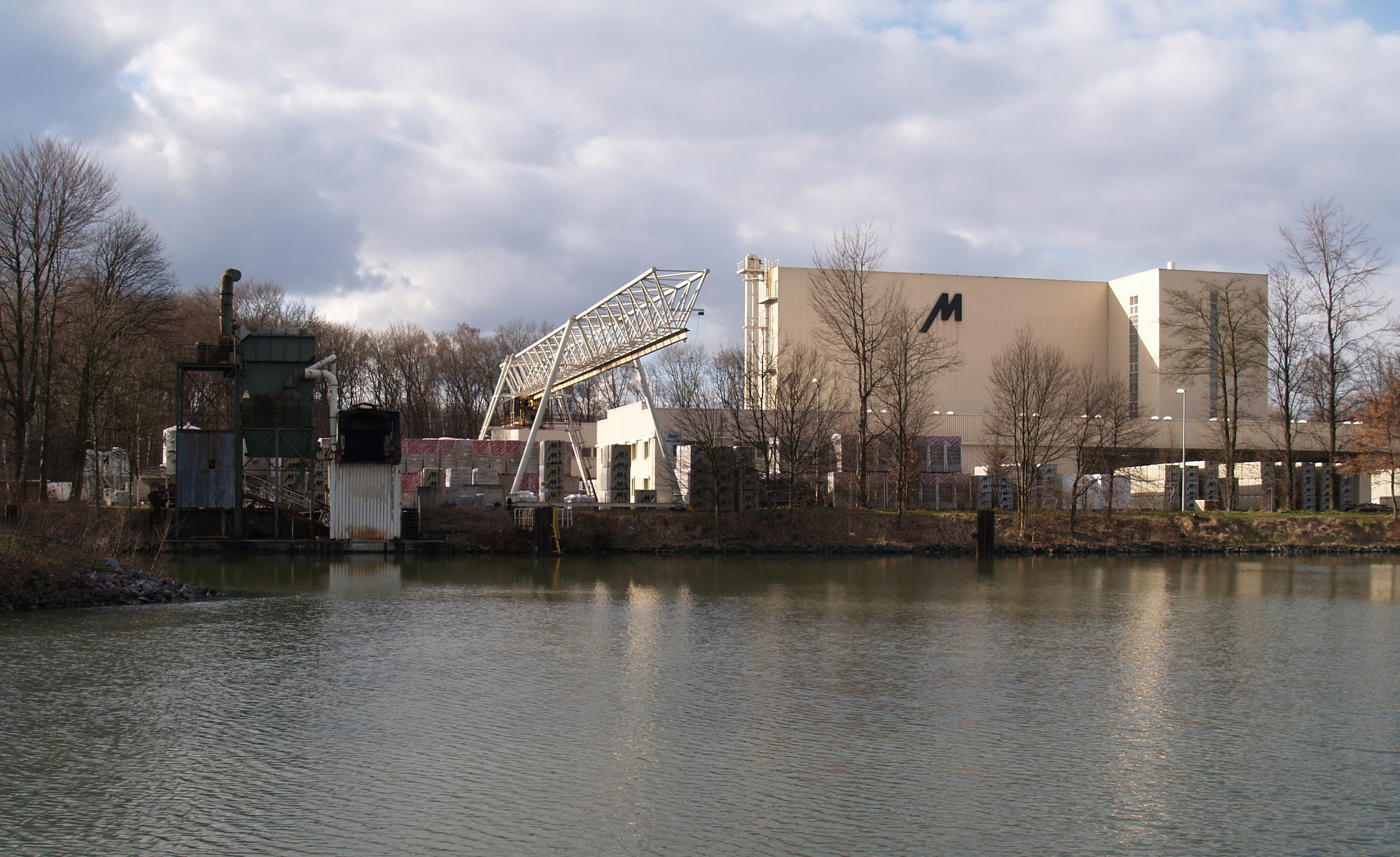
Port marmorit with its single fixed crane

Port Marmorit (Hafen Marmorit) is the port of cement and lime mortar manufacturer and distributor Marmorit Knauf GmbH located north of a disused canal side channel and just north of the bridge carrying Wartburgstraße (Wartburgstreet). The actual facility consists of little more than a pier.

=== Waltrop lock park ===
Here after 45.6 kilometres (28.3 mi) ends (or begins) the Rhine–Herne Canal, which meets the Dortmund-Ems canal (at the 14.7-kilometre mark) near the old Henrichenburg boat lift (replaced in 1962 by a newer lock, and in 1989 by a new larger lock). The terminal is used as a mooring for pleasure craft. It forms part of the Waltrop lock park.

== Ecosystem ==
Fish that inhabit the canal include European eel, European carp, zander, carp bream, common roach and common rudd, as well as the less common pike and rainbow trout.

== Cities ==
- Duisburg
- Oberhausen
- Essen
- Bottrop
- Gelsenkirchen
- Herne
- Recklinghausen
- Castrop-Rauxel
- Waltrop
- Datteln
