= Gelsenwasser =

German utility company

Gelsenwasser AG

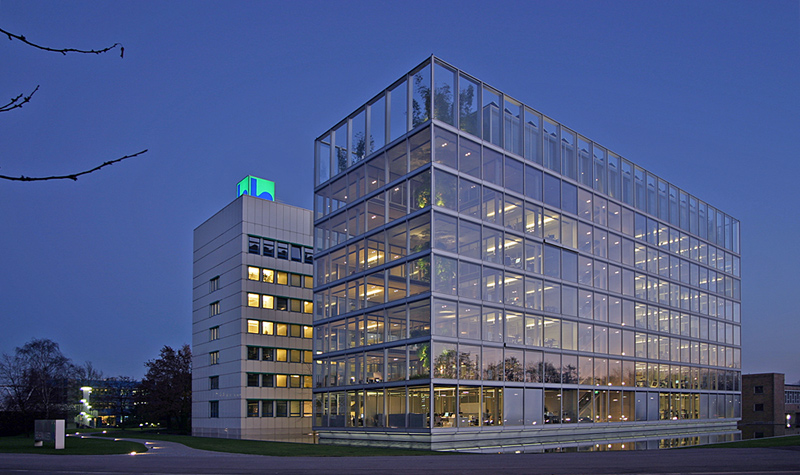
- Headquarters of the European-wide water supply company Gelsenwasser AG in Gelsenkirchen.
- Industry: water industry
- Headquarters: Germany
- Number of employees: 1,595 (2020)

Gelsenwasser AG is a German private utilities company that supplies natural gas and fresh water to residents in Germany. Areas of service include Ruhr, Lower Rhine, Westphalia, Lower Saxony, Brandenburg, Mecklenburg-Western Pomerania, Münster, and Saxony-Anhalt. The company also provides wastewater filtration services, and electricity.
