= Emscher =

River in Germany

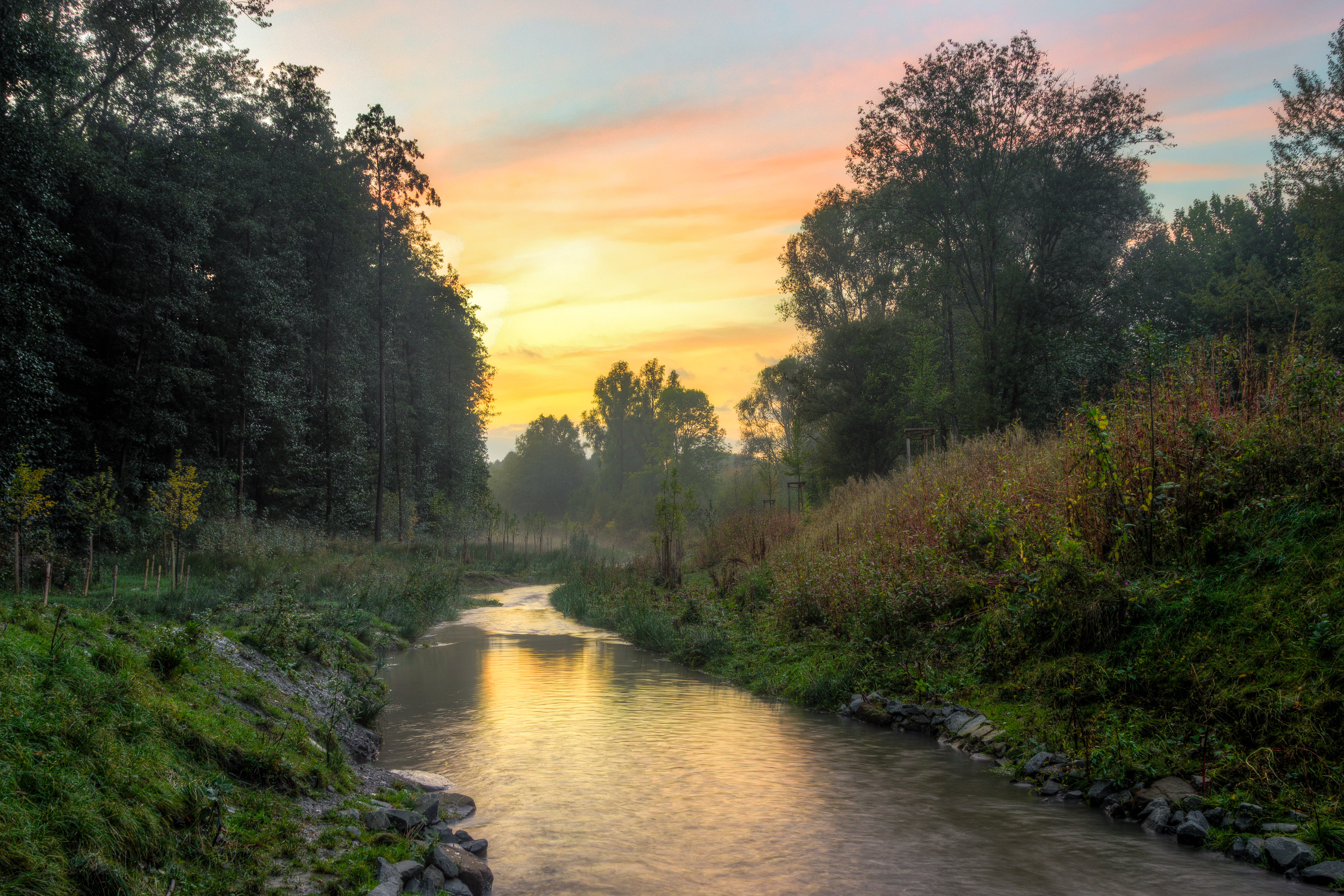
- The Emscher in southern Dortmund

Location
- Country: Germany

Physical characteristics
- Source: Holzwickede
  - location: Eastern Ruhr Area
  - elevation: 160 m (520 ft)
- Mouth: Rhine
  - coordinates: 51°33′48″N 6°41′23″E
- Length: 83.2 km (51.7 mi)
- Basin size: 793 km^{2} (306 sq mi)
- Discharge
  - average: 16 m^{3}/s (570 cu ft/s)

Basin features
- Progression: Rhine→ North Sea

The Emscher (German pronunciation: [ˈɛmʃɐ]) is a river, a tributary of the Rhine, that flows through the Ruhr area in North Rhine-Westphalia in western Germany. Its overall length is 83 kilometres (52 mi) with a mean outflow near the mouth into the lower Rhine of 16 m^{3}/s (570 cu ft/s).

== Description ==
The Emscher has its wellspring in Holzwickede, east of the city of Dortmund. Towns along the Emscher are Dortmund, Castrop-Rauxel, Herne, Recklinghausen, Gelsenkirchen, Essen, Bottrop, Oberhausen and Dinslaken, where it flows into the Rhine.

At the centre of a vast industrial area with 5 million inhabitants the river was biologically dead, as it was used as an open waste-water canal from the end of the 19th century. The subsidence caused by coal mining along its route made the option of subterranean sewer pipes running alongside unworkable, as they would break each time the ground shifted.

Owing to the steady flow of spoil from the mining industry it has been impossible for the route of the Emscher to be maintained and its mouth into the Rhine has shifted north twice. A large wastewater treatment plant at its mouth treats the water of the Emscher before it flows into the Rhine.

== Restoration ==
Since the early 1990s, efforts to restore the Emscher to its natural state have been making headway. The last coal mine (Bergwerk Prosper-Haniel) was closed in December 2018. Now that coal mining near the route of the river has halted, a large underground pipe is being built along the path of the river. The first stretch of the river to be restored is that in the city of Dortmund. The overall project is headed by the public water board Emschergenossenschaft. The main work was completed at the end of August 2022, with a budget of 5.5 billion euros.

The Emscher renaturation project, which is funded by a total of €1.3 billion in EU bank finance, protects and generates 1400 jobs per year.

While the river was not returned to its historical path, it now supports some fish and other wildlife. It has been turned into a recreation spot, with extensive cycle paths.
