= Dortmund–Ems Canal barge =

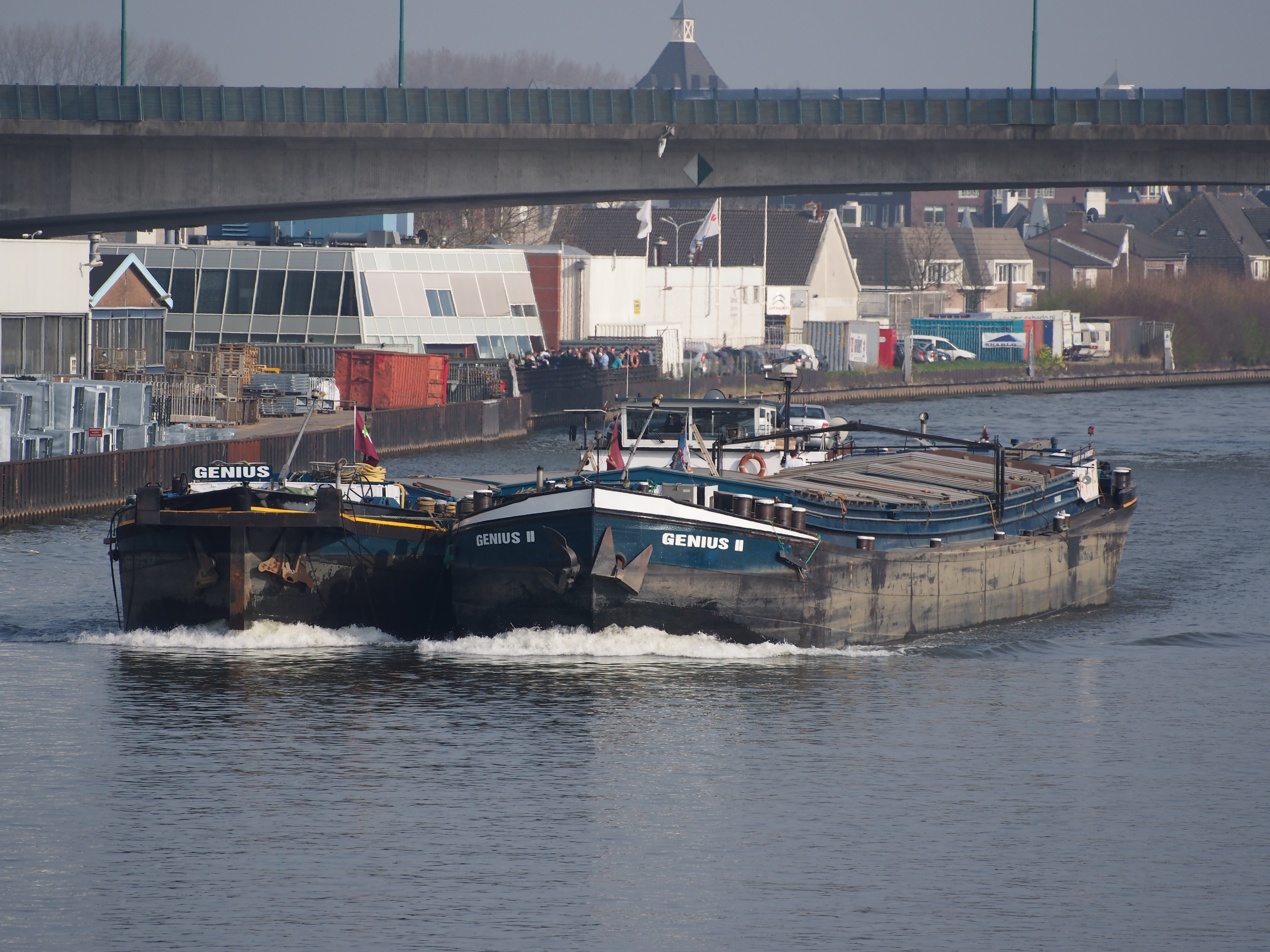
Dortmund–Ems Canal towed barge Genius II (1929) moved by barge Genius I

The Dortmund–Ems Canal barge or Dortmund–Ems–Kanal–Schiff is a type of barge that was based on the dimensions of the German Dortmund–Ems Canal. It became the standard vessel for CEMT class III waterways. In the Netherlands, it's colloquially known as a 'Dortmunder'.

At first, the Dortmund–Ems Canal barge did not have its own means of propulsion. In time, the type evolved. When it became economical to motorize barges, it became self propelled and (often) longer. As the Dortmund–Ems Canal became deeper, it increased in draft. This also applied to existing barges, which were lengthened and motorized.

A special type of motorized Dortmund–Ems Canal barge is the Gustav Koenigs type of motorized barge. It was developed based on experiments that aimed to establish the most economical ship form on the Dortmund–Ems Canal. The Gustav Koenigs type (and with it, the Dortmund–Ems Canal barge) was standardized as CEMT class III for motorized barges west of the Elbe in 1992.

== Context ==
The Dortmund–Ems Canal, completed in 1899 was primarily meant for bulk transport. Iron ore from the north (Sweden) would be able to reach the Ruhr via the German North Sea ports. In return, coal from the Ruhr would become cheaper in Northern Germany. This could only be economical if the barges used on the canal were big enough to compete with the vessels used on the Rhine.

When the Dortmund–Ems Canal was planned, it seemed to allow a barge that would be very economical. In 1878, barges of 700–800 ton had been the largest vessels on the Rhine. The Dortmund–Ems Canal barge was called '600t barge', but could actually load 750t. In 1886 authorities decided to build the canal. However, when the canal was opened in 1899, barges of over 1,500t were already in use on the Rhine.

The canal was constructed with the idea that two regular barges could always pass each other on the canal, i.e. like a two-track railway. This did not apply to the locks. Therefore, the locks determined the maximum size of a barge that could physically use the canal if they were allowed on the canal. When it was taken into use, regular Dortmund–Ems canal barges could carry 700–800t.

The Dortmund–Ems Canal was initially 30 m wide on the surface with a bottom that was 2.5 m deep and 18 m wide. It had locks of 67 by 8.6 m. Below Gleesen Lock in Emsbüren, the locks were 10 m wide and 165 m long. These could serve two barge tow formations.

== The original Dortmund–Ems Canal barge (600–1000t) ==
There were at least three types of Dortmund–Ems Canal barge that sailed the canal before it was improved in the early 1960s. The towed Dortmund–Ems Canal barge was the default type. There were also a small number of steam-powered barges. Motorized barges were invented shortly after the opening of the canal.

=== The Dortmund–Ems Canal towed barge ===
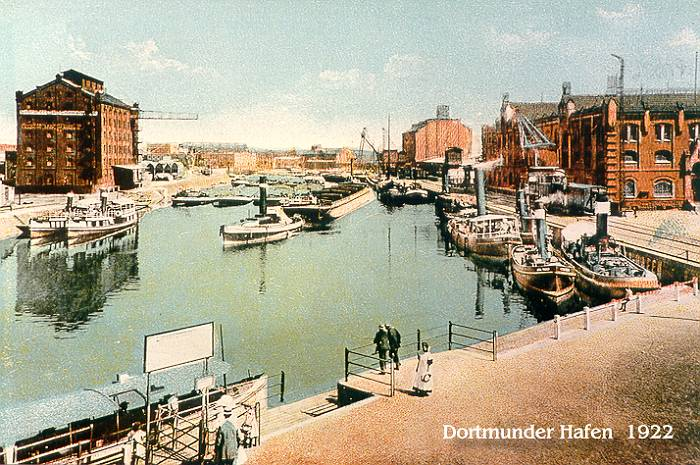
Steam tugboats in Dortmund in 1922

This was called the Dortmund–Ems-Kanal Kahn in German. It was a barge designed to be towed. It had a length of 65–67 m and a beam of 8.2 m. Maximum draft was 2 m. The older barges indeed had a hull that was only 2–2.30 m high on the sides.

Other particulars of the barge were that it was made of steel with a rather plump bow. Most had living quarters below deck at the bow and stern. There was usually a small wooden kitchen at the stern deck. The hold was generally partitioned in 8 parts. After (un)loading, the hold could be covered by a wooden roof.

The 1899 Dortmund–Ems Canal barge had neither sail nor engine and was pulled by a tugboat. At the time, the only available means of mechanical propulsion was the steam engine. However, a steam engine and the required coal took up so much space and weight (draft!) that it was economical to put the steam engine in a separate tugboat or steam boat that pulled multiple barges.

There was another strong reason to separate the vessel that moved the barge from the barge that actually carried the cargo. This was the long time that it took to load and unload a barge combined with the high cost of steam engines. It made that while loading in port, a steamboat burned a lot more money than a (sailing) barge.

Administrative matters that influenced the shape of the towed Dortmund–Ems Canal barge were the state monopoly on towage and the pricing schema. Towage cost was calculated according to the weight of the cargo, the distance of towage and the local circumstances. This led to box like vessels that were hard to tow and hard to steer.

=== The steamboat ===
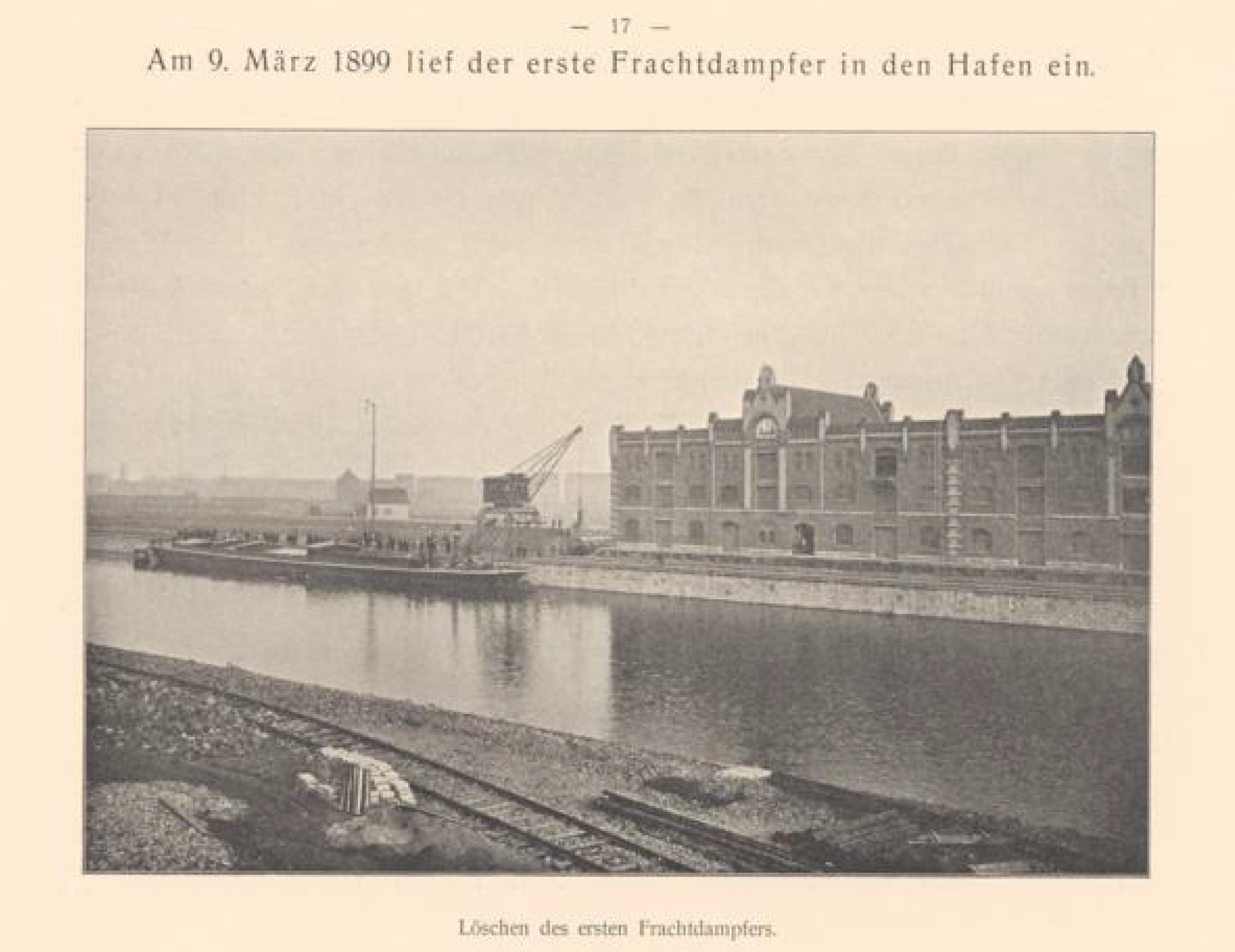
Steamboat in the harbor of Dortmund, March 1899

For transporing general cargo it did make sense to give barges their own propulsion. On 9 March 1899, the steamboat (Frachtdampfer) Dortmund entered the new harbor of Dortmund from downstream.

At least two companies used steamboats for carrying general cargo on the canal. These were the Schleppschiffahrtsgesellschaft Dortmund Ems and the Westfälische Transport A.G. (WTAG). WTAG would start its business with 30 iron towed barges of 27,000t capacity (avg. 900t), 4 tugboats, and 4 steamboats referred to as Güterschraubendampfern.

=== The Dortmund–Ems Canal motor barge ===
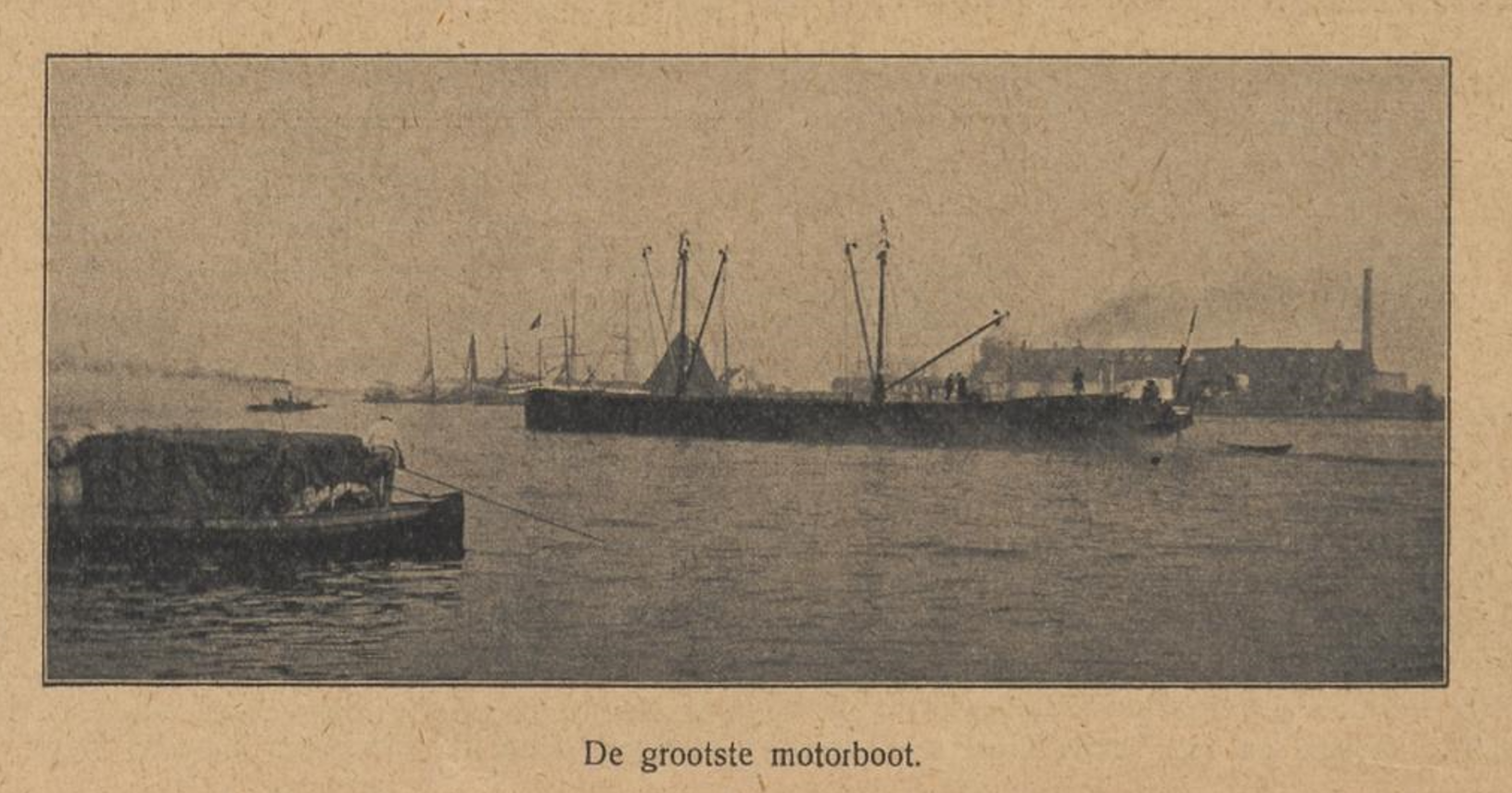
Dortmund, 1907

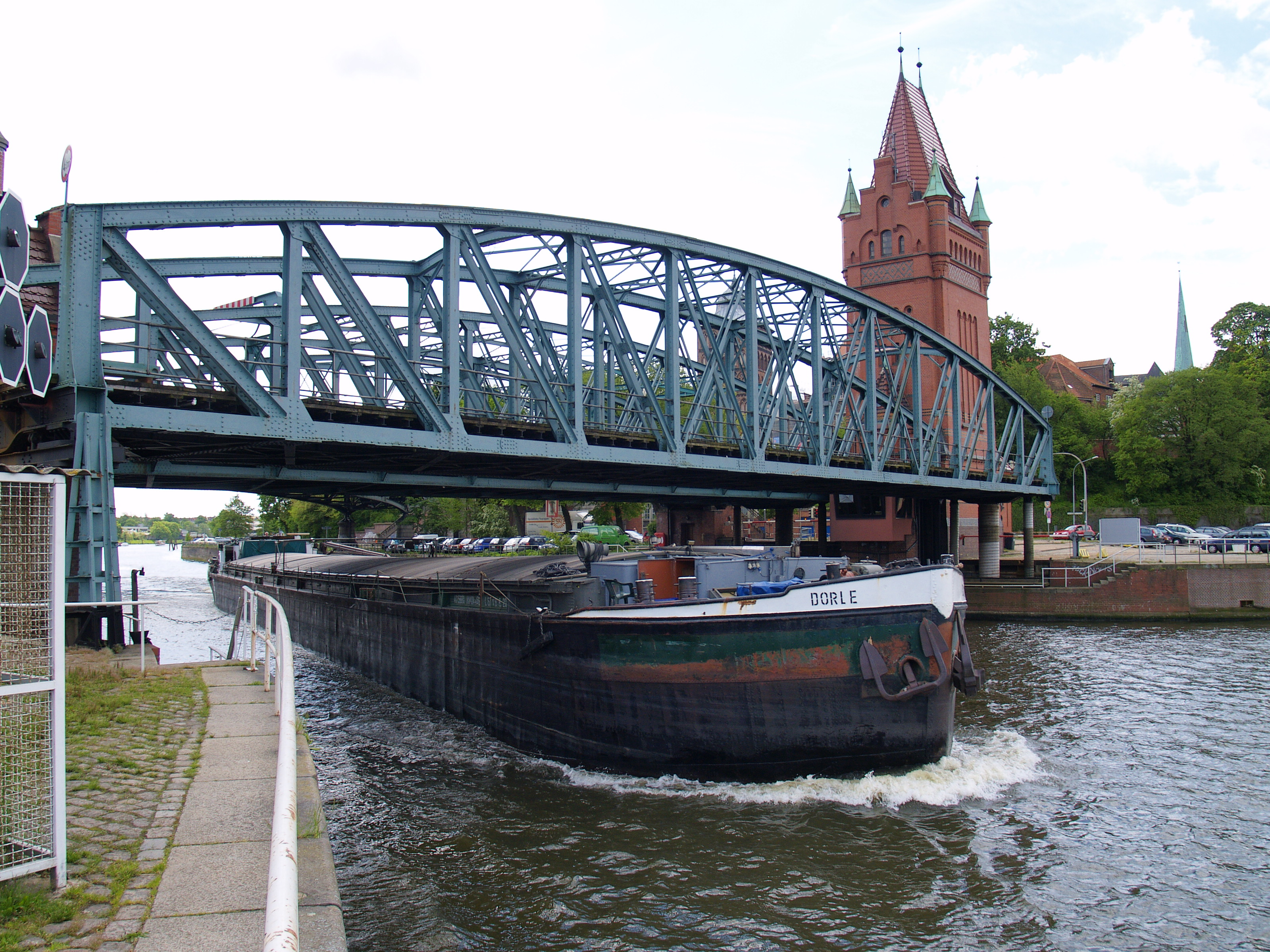
Ernst Schwienendieck (1937), now Dorle

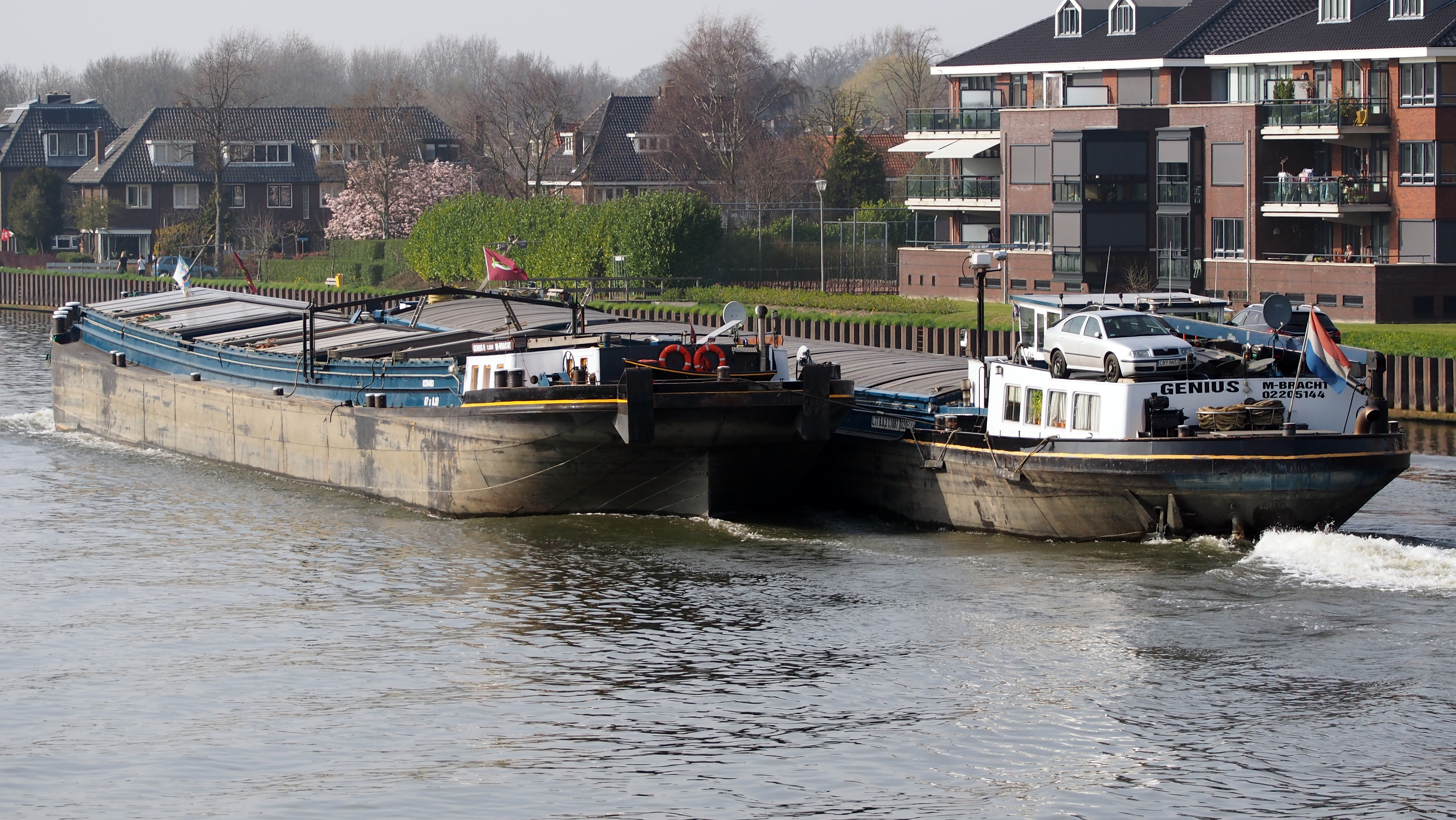
Lengthened Genius I on the right

In time, self propelled motor barges came into use. In 1907, the Vereinigte Bugsir- und Frachtschiffahrt Gesellschaft from Hamburg had the motor vessel Dortmund built. This was a seaworthy twin screw vessel with 52 ihp. It measured 57 by 8.11 m with a depth of hold of 2.91 m and could carry 825t, fully loaded it weighed 1,175t. The motor vessel Dortmund made the news, because it was such a big motor vessel.

The more interesting question is whether there existed a self-propelled version of the original Dortmund–Ems Canal barge, independent of the later Gustav König type. The construction list of the Arminius Shipyard in Bodenwerder provides an answer. After constructing a few smaller motor barges, it built another motor vessel for the WTAG in 1932. This was Emden, a vessel of the same length and beam as the towed barges that the shipyard made for WTAG. The only slightly different measurements were the hull height of 2.65 m and the capacity, which was about 15t lower.

After World War II, this pattern continued at the Arminius Shipyard. For the motor barges, the hull height of 2.65 m was brought back to 2.50 m. It made the outer measurements of the towed and self propelled barge identical.

In 1957, the Arminius Shipyard still built a towed and some self propelled barges for the Dortmund–Ems Canal. These were probably the last towed Dortmund–Ems Canal barges built by the yard. In 1962, the shipyard built its last motor barge of the same outer measurements as the older towed barge.

The barge Ernst Schwienendieck now Dorle, is an example of the early motorized Dortmund–Ems barges. It was built as a motorized barge for WTAG in 1937. Measurements were 67.00 by 8.20 by 2.65 m and it had 300 hp.

=== From 600t to 1,200t barges ===
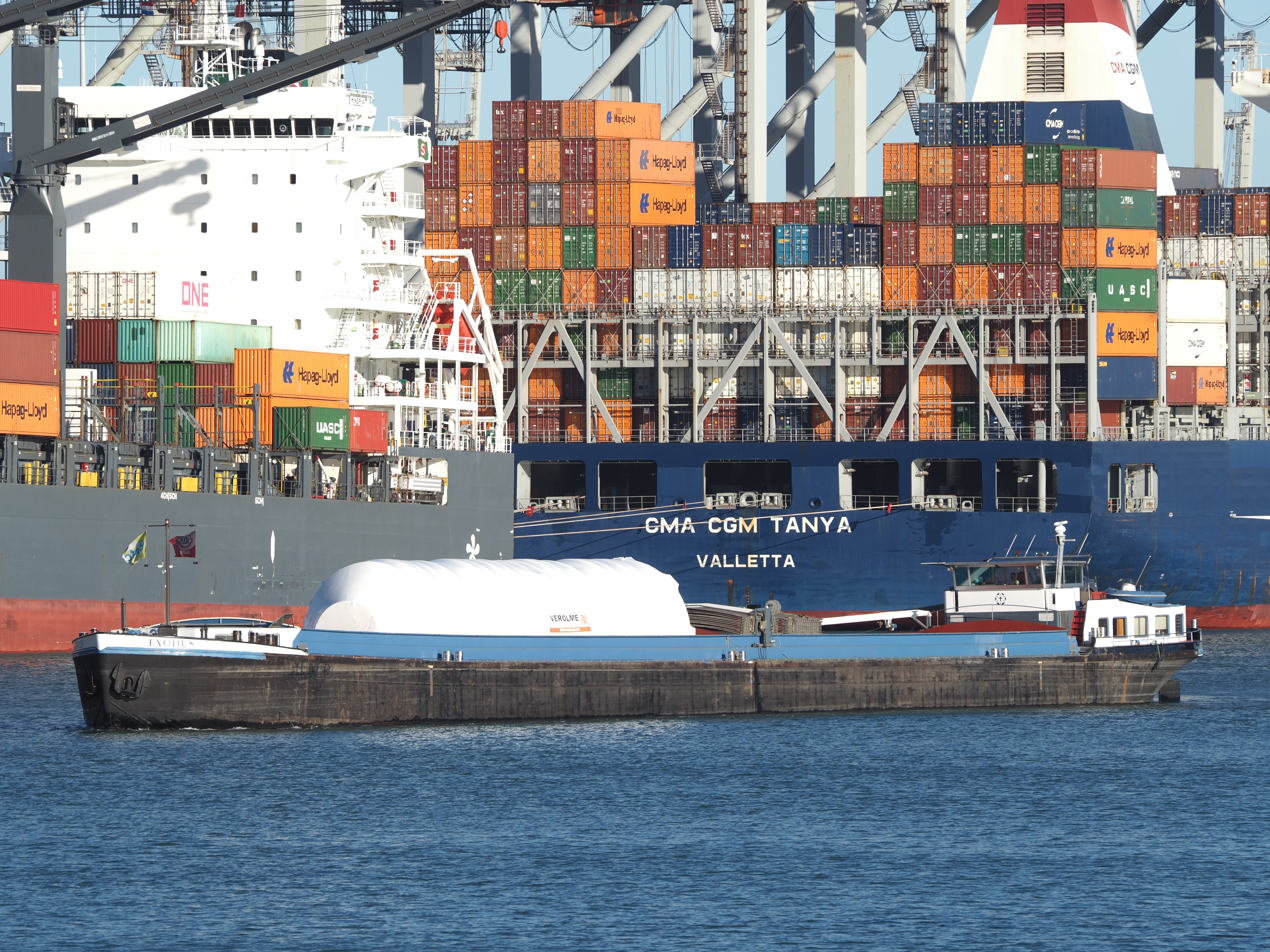
Exodus (1954) in Rotterdam

The carrying capacity of the Dortmund–Ems Canal barge was first given as 600t. Later this became 700/800t, and in 1959 almost 1,000t. The first step has a very obvious explanation. In January 1899, authorities determined that barges on the canal would be allowed a draft of 2.00 m instead of only 1.75 m. This raised carrying capacity from 600 to about 750t.

From 1952 to 1959, the Dortmund–Ems Canal was made deeper, so it could accommodate vessels with a draft of 2.5 m. It meant that by 1959, a Dortmund–Ems Canal barge of the same length and width could carry almost 1,000t, because it was allowed to have a draft of 2.5 m.

The actual carrying capacity and height of the hull sides of barges on the canal seems inconsistent with the depth of the canal. E.g. the construction list of the Arminius shipyard indicates that from the mid-1920s onward, towed Dortmund–Ems Canal barges had a height of 2.50 m and a carrying capacity of almost 1,000t. A logical explanation would be that this about 20% surplus capacity could be used in deeper waters.

The appearance of almost 1,200t Dortmund–Ems Canal barges seemed strange. Up till August 1962, the old Henrichenburg boat lift (see below) enforced the old size limits on barges that wanted to sail the last about 15 km from Henrichenburg to Dortmund. On the rest of the canal, the allowed maximum width of 8.20 m remained in place, but the allowed length apparently increased to almost 80 m. For only a few years, i.e. from 1959 to 1963, the Arminius shipyard built some new vessels that were 8.20 m wide, and 77–80 m long, measuring up to 1,200t.

Of course, lengthened Dortmund–Ems Canal barges could also reach a capacity of about 1,200t. Exodus, was built as towed barge W.T.A.G. 104 in 1954. In 1963, she was lengthened to 79.90 m. Carrying capacity is close 1,200t.

=== Motorization and lengthening ===
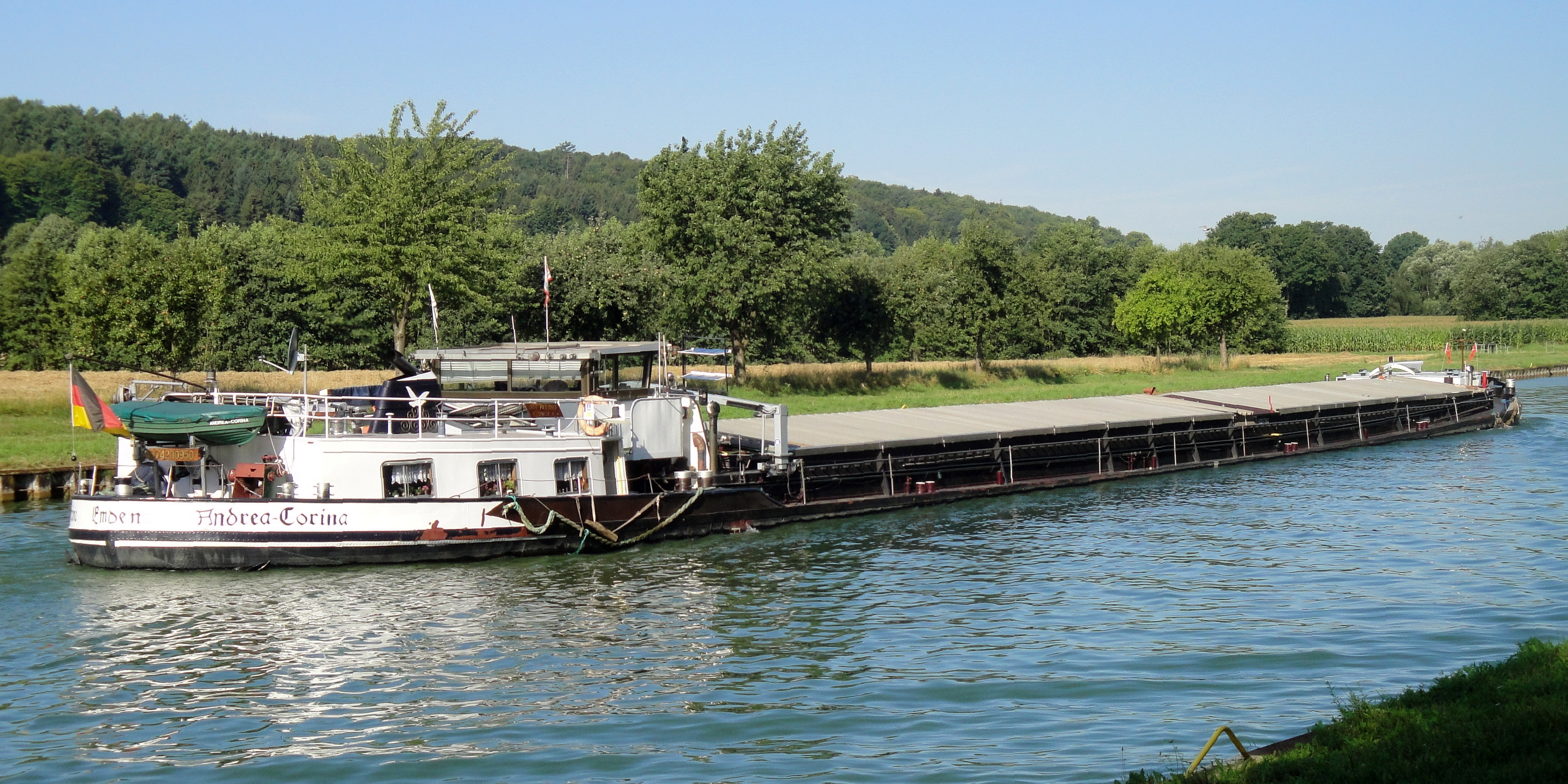
Motorized and lengthened Andrea-Corina (1928)

In the early and mid-1960s, most of the towed barges were broken up. Less than half of the towed barges, most of them built after 1920, where or had been motorized. An even smaller part was turned into pushed or connected (koppelverband) barges. Motorization was often combined with lengthening the barge.

One of the many Dortmund–Ems Canal barges that was motorized and lengthened was Andrea-Corina. She was built as Bremen 20 in 1928 by Meyer Werft in Papenburg. The original dimensions were 65.00 by 8.15 by 2.00 m. In 1950, she was motorized and lengthened by Wilhelm Rasche in Uffeln (Vlotho). The new dimensions were 77.00 by 8.15 by 2.33 m, capacity 942t.

== The Gustav Koenigs barge ==
As mentioned above, circumstances made that the towed barges on the major German canals became box-like. I.e. they had a high cargo capacity, but required a lot of force to tow. In the late 1920s, this led to a program to scientifically establish the effort to pull different forms of hulls through a canal.

This research program led to a model form (lines) for the hull of the Dortmund–Ems Canal barge and four other typical barges. The research was quite extensive. It e.g. showed that a self propelled Dortmund–Ems Canal barge with 300 hp was more economical if it sailed alone. If it had 700 hp, it was better to have another Dortmund–Ems Canal barge in tow.

== Standardization and C.E.M.T. ==
The significance of the Dortmund–Ems Canal barge is that it became one of the standard ships that determine the size of European waterways. This happened in phases. The first phase was that authorities took the Dortmund–Ems Canal into consideration while planning new or upgraded canals. The second phase consisted of the agreements by the Conférence européenne des ministres des Transports (CEMT) in the 1950s. The 1992 classification resolution mentioned the Dortmund–Ems Canal barge as Gustav Koenigs.

The first phase runs from 1899 till the mid 1950s. The standardization of barges became important in the 19th century. The sheer size and length of the Dortmund–Ems Canal made that other canal projects standardized to its measurements. In 1917, the initial design for the Van Starkenborgh Canal in the northern Netherlands called for a canal suitable for barges of 67 by 8.20 by 2 m. In the end, the Dutch chose a bigger size based on their own system.

In the 1950s the barge became part of international agreements. The European transport ministers, united in the C.E.M.T. made some agreements on the European inland waterways. It stated that there were five types (classes) of European towed barges and four classes of German self-propelled barges. The Dortmund–Ems Canal towed barge and Gustav Koenigs were both class III with a beam of 8.20 m, a draft of 2.50 m, and a capacity of 1,000t and 930t.

In 1992 a third phase started. The European transport ministers agreed that all their inland waterways should be based on a classification. This was the well known CEMT 1992 classification. The Dortmund–Ems Canal barge / Gustav Koenigs formed class III of canals for vessels west of the Elbe. Its dimensions would be length: 67–80 m, beam 8.20 m, draft 2.50 m, and tonnage 650-1000t.

== The end ==
In 1962, the Dortmund–Ems Canal would be made suitable for Rhine–Herne Canal barges. This was announced by the West German transport minister when he officially opened the deeper Dortmund–Ems Canal in 1959. The decision was based on the agreement of the European Transport ministers that 1350t (CEMT IV) vessels would be the normal vessels on European inland waterways.

In August 1962, the new Henrichenburg boat lift for 1350t vessels was opened as part of this plan. Its trough was 90 metres long with a width of 12 metres and a draft of 3 metres. The 1350t vessel that opened the new boat lift was Wilhelm Droste. This vessel measured 85,00 x 9,50 x 2,65 m and could carry 1445t.

In the mid 1950s, a study about the profitability of operating a Gustav Koenigs (Dortmund–Ems) barge or a Johann Welker (Rhine–Herne) barge showed how much more advantageous the larger Rhine–Herne Canal barge was. The upgrade of canals to CEMT IV class led to an almost complete stop on constructing more Gustav Koenigs / Dortmund–Ems Canal barges.
