= Dortmund–Ems Canal =

Canal in Germany

Coordinates: 52°16′55″N 7°32′31″E

- Overview map of the canal
- Interactive map of Dortmund–Ems Canal

Specifications
- Length: 269 km (167 mi)

History
- Date completed: 1899

Geography
- Start point: Dortmund Port in Dortmund, Germany
- End point: Emden, Germany

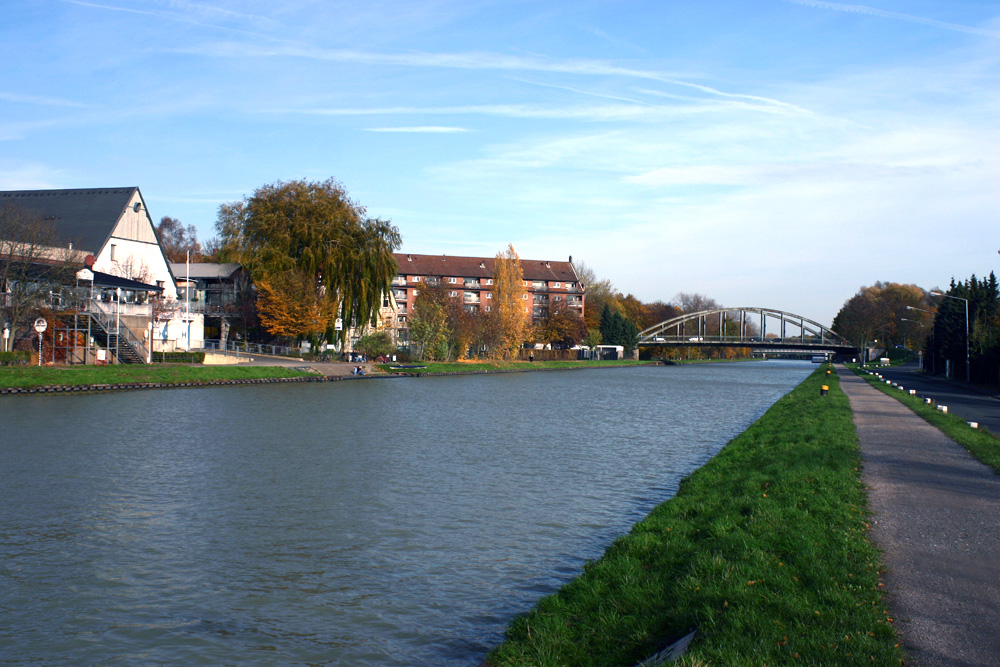
Dortmund-Ems canal in Münster

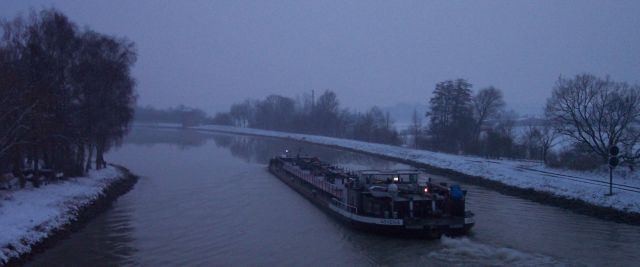
The Dortmund-Ems canal in winter

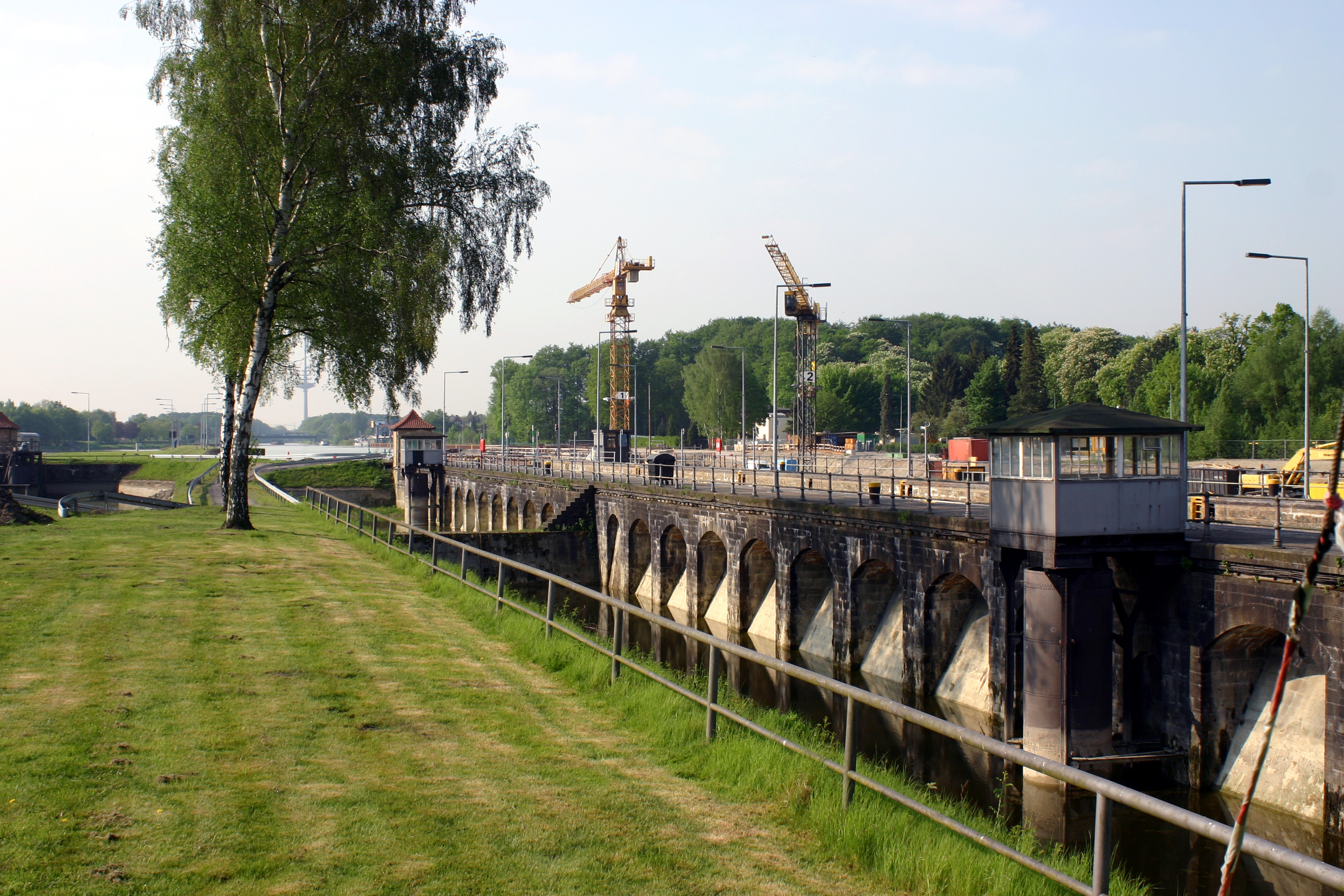
Münster lock

The Dortmund–Ems Canal is a 269-kilometre (167 mi) long canal in Germany between the inland port of the city of Dortmund () and the seaport of Emden. The artificial southern part of the canal ends after 215 kilometres (134 mi) at Herbrum lock near Meppen. The route then takes the river Ems for 45 kilometres (28 mi) to Oldersum lock. From there, the canal continues along a second artificial segment of 9 kilometres (6 mi). This latter section was built because inland ships at the time of the construction of the canal were not built for the open sea, which they would have faced at the Dollart and the entry to the sea port of Emden. It is connected to the Ems-Jade Canal from Emden to Wilhelmshaven.

== History ==
The canal was opened in 1899 to reduce demand on the railway network, which could not cope with the transport of products from the Ruhr area. Also, the canal was supposed to make coal from the Ruhr area more competitive compared to imported English coal. Furthermore, the steel industry in the eastern Ruhr area needed to import ore from abroad.

The canal was so important that a lot of barges and motor vessels were built to its dimensions. These are the Dortmund–Ems Canal barge and the Gustav Koenigs type. Both sailed on many other routes and make up the CEMT class III vessels. In 1962, the canal was upgraded for use by 1350t vessels, i.e. CEMT class IV.

The canal was attacked numerous times during World War II due to its strategic importance. During June through August 12th 1940 a series of raids culminating in a raid by 49 and 83 Squadrons damaged the aqueducts that crossed the River Ems - putting the canal out of commission for short periods. Operation Garlic, an attack in September 1943 by 617 Squadron RAF (the "Dambusters") was unsuccessful and costly. The squadron attacked it again in September 1944 using Tallboy "earthquake" bombs breaching it and causing considerable damage. In August 1944, 571 squadron attacked it with de Havilland Mosquitos, dropping mines into the canal. It was repaired after the conflict.

== Description ==
The best known building of the Dortmund-Ems canal is the Henrichenburg boat lift in Waltrop, which enabled a ship to bridge a difference in height of 14 metres (46 ft). It operated until 1962, and was then replaced by a new elevator and a lock. Today it houses the Westfälisches Industriemuseum.

Some kilometres to the north, the canal reaches the city of Datteln, which lies at the crossroads of four canals:

- Datteln-Hamm Canal
- Wesel-Datteln Canal
- Dortmund–Ems Canal
- Rhein-Herne Canal

The old route of the canal crosses the rivers Lippe, Stever and Ems on bridges. These bridges are built with large arches, and the bridge over the Lippe lies 15 metres (49 ft) above the river.

After the Second World War, the canal had to be widened. Those parts that were above ground level could not easily be widened, and therefore a new route was constructed between Olfen and Münster. It lies parallel to the old route, and new river crossings were also built. The old route was closed for shipping.

Dortmund-Ems-Kanal-Route is a 350 km long official long-distance cycling route next to the canal.

== Towns along the canal ==
Dortmund - Waltrop - Datteln - Olfen - Lüdinghausen - Senden - Hiltrup - Münster - Dörenthe - Hörstel - Bevergern - Rheine - Hesselte - Lingen - Geeste - Meppen - Haren - Papenburg - Düthe - Heede - Lehe - Aschendorf - Oldersum - Emden -
