= Freycinet gauge =

French standard for canal lock sizes

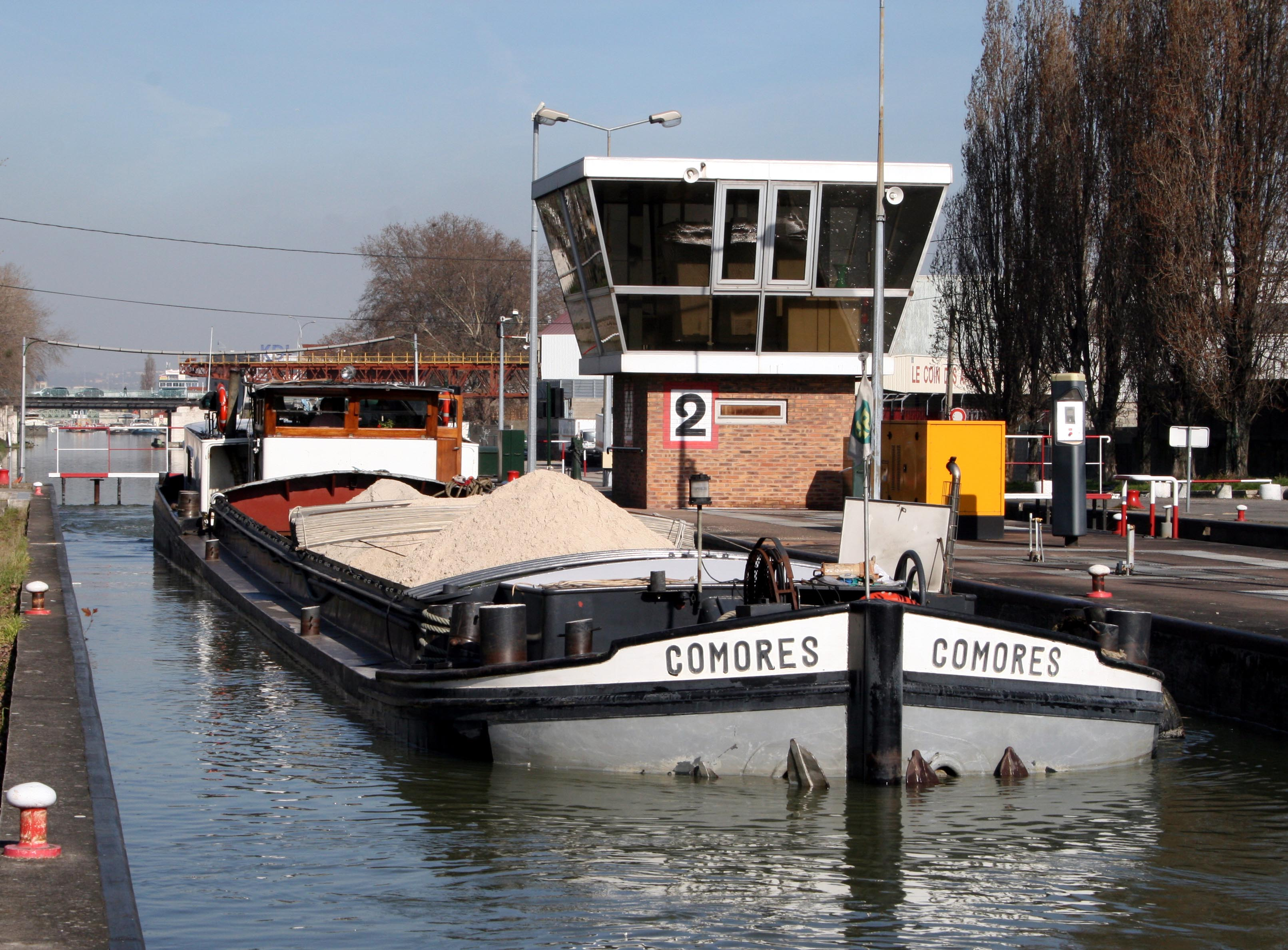
Péniche on the Saint-Denis Canal

The Freycinet gauge (French: gabarit Freycinet) is a standard governing the dimensions of the locks of some canals, put in place as a result of a law passed during the tenure of Charles de Freycinet as minister of public works of France, dating from 5 August 1879. The law required the size of lock chambers to be increased to a length of 39 metres (128 ft), a width of 5.2 metres (17 ft) and a minimum water depth of 2.2 metres (7 ft 3 in), thus allowing 300 to 350 tonne barges to pass through.

Consequently, boats and barges, such as the péniche, built to the Freycinet gauge could not exceed 38.5 metres (126 ft) in length, 5.05 metres (16.6 ft) in breadth and a draught of 1.8 metres (5 ft 11 in). Bridges and other structures built across the canals are required to provide 3.7 metres (12 ft) of clearance.

In the late nineteenth and early twentieth centuries many French canals were modernised to conform to the Freycinet standard. By 2001, 5,800 km (3,604 mi) of navigable waterways in France corresponded to the Freycinet gauge, accounting for 23% of waterborne traffic.

A Freycinet gauge lock on the Burgundy Canal,

== European Classification ==
The Freycinet gauge corresponds to the Classification of European Inland Waterways class I gauge.

European Inland Waterway Boat Classifications
Class	Capacity	Length	Width	Draught
0	Under 300 Tonne	N/A	N/A	N/A
I	300 Tonne (the péniche)	38.5 m	5.05 m	2.5 m
II	600 Tonne	50 m	6.6 m	2.5 m
III	1000 Tonne	67 m	8.2 m	2.5 m
IV	1350 Tonne	80 m	9.5 m	2.5 m
V	2000 Tonne	95 m	11.5 m	2.7 m
VI	3000 Tonne and over	N/A	N/A	N/A
