= Péniche (barge) =

Type of ship

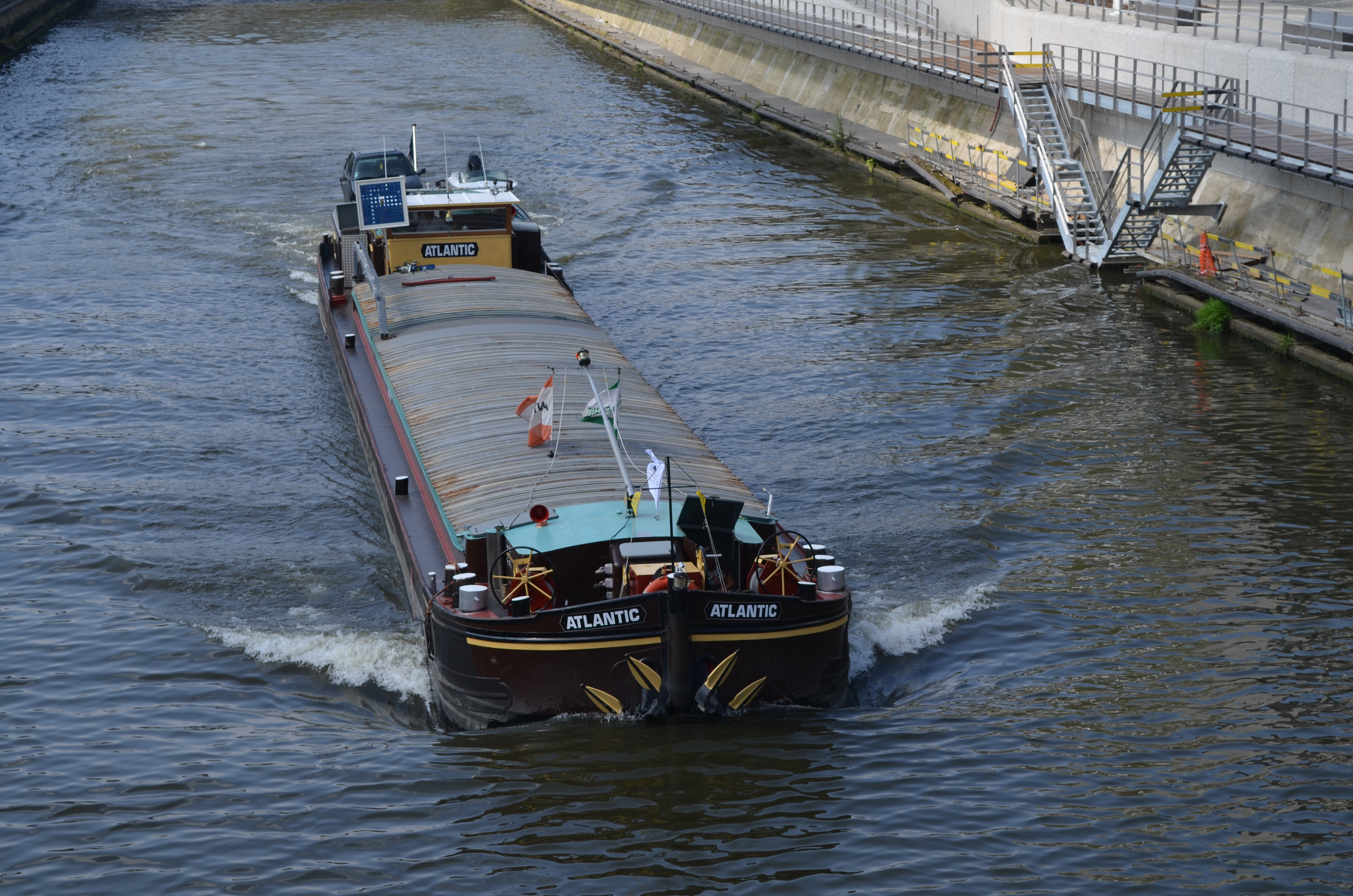
The Atlantic at Charleroi, Wallonia Belgium

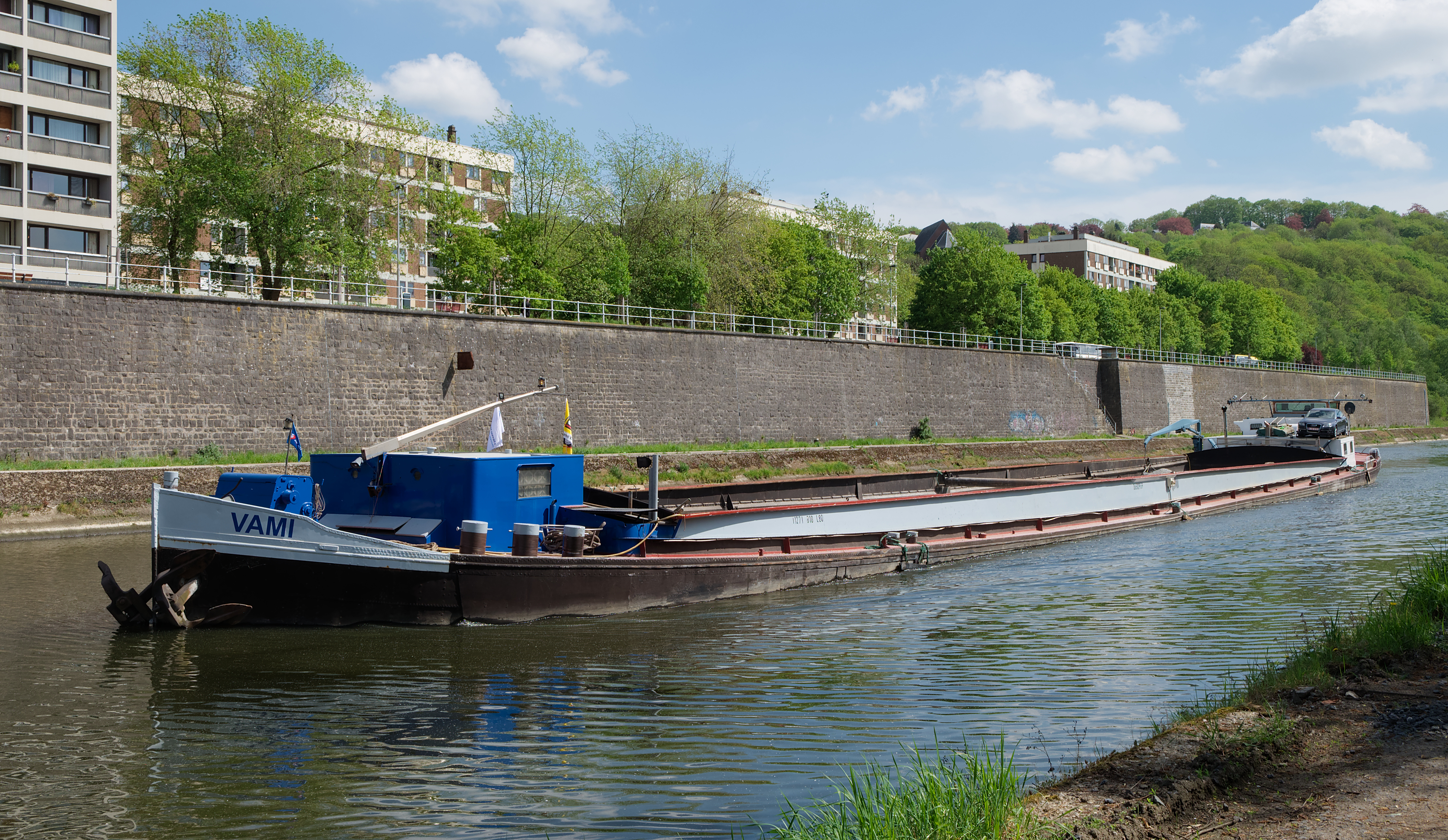
Vami péniche in Namur

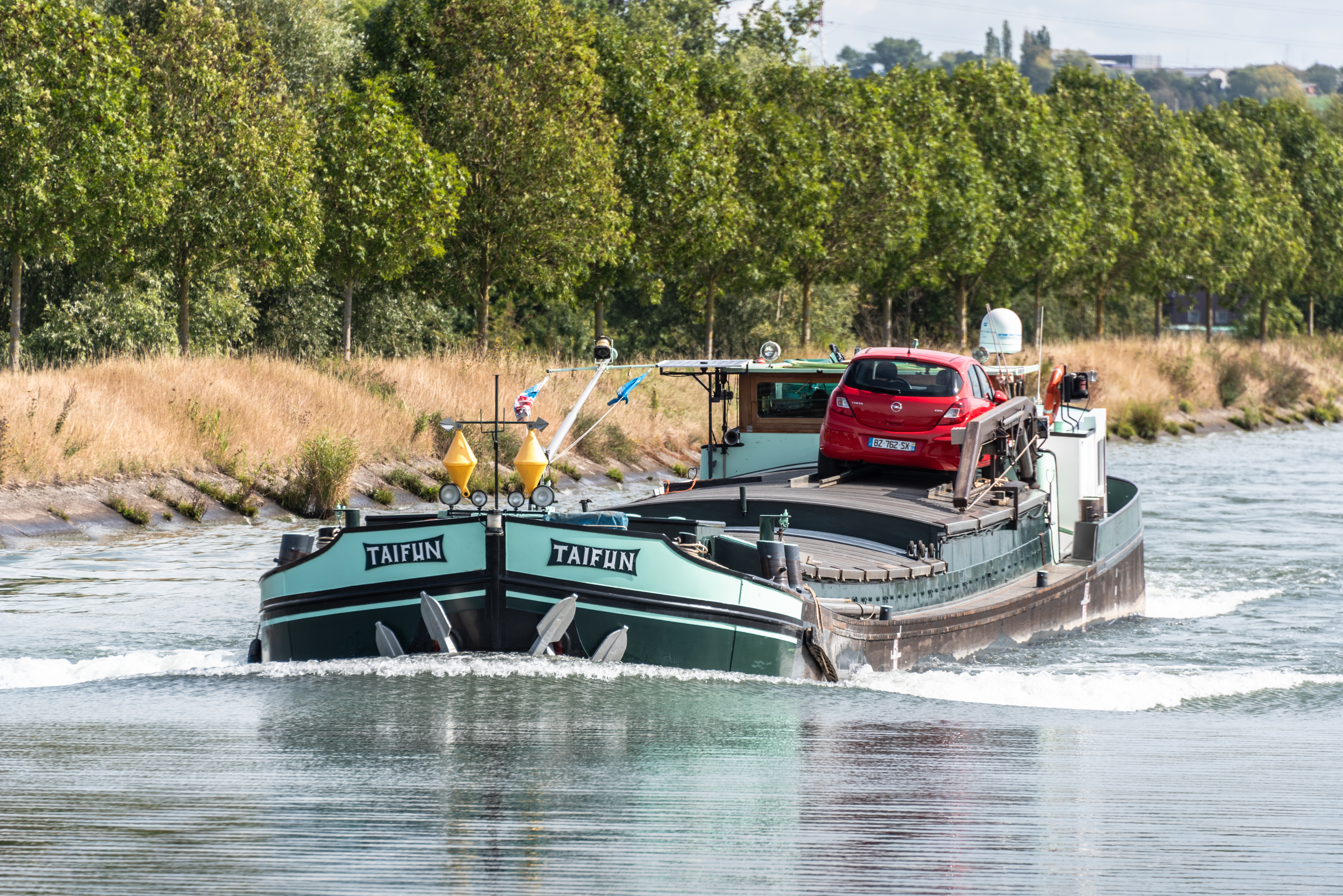
The Taifun, built in 1903, in the Scheldt Canal

A péniche (or spits in Dutch) is a steel motorised inland waterway barge of up to 350 tonnes' capacity. Péniche barges were built to fit the post-1880s French waterways and the locks of Freycinet gauge. They are visually similar to a Dutch barge, but built to different specifications.

== Dimensions ==
The critical detail for the péniche is the dimension, a maximum of 38.50 m (126 ft) long, 1.60 m draft and 5.05 m (16.6 ft) wide. They were especially designed for the Belgian and French canal locks, and as a result of the wish to maximise space for freight, the barges tend to be flat-sided, with short, rounded bows and sterns. Nowadays the specification is still applied for commercial navigation as Class I in the Classification of European Inland Waterways.

== History ==
The péniche originated in Belgium, as a wooden vessel for inland navigation. A pointy bow was added and this version was also called a 'pointu' in Wallonia, a 'spits' in Flanders and a 'péniche flamande' in France. When ships came to be built of steel this type became a 'dumb' barge that had to be towed by a towboat. In the 1910s this barge became a motor ship and a popular one at that. In the 1920s about 950 péniches were built in Belgium.

In the early 1940s many Belgian péniches were claimed by the Germans to take part in the invasion of Great Britain. To make them seaworthy they were welded together in pairs, side by side.

The last spits was built in the Netherlands in 1973. Many former freight péniches have been converted into living, hotel or pleasure craft.

== Types ==
The Belgian péniche is the standard version, built for the Belgian and French canal locks. Some of them have been lengthened by about 9 m or were originally built at 47 m (154 ft) or 48 m (157 ft). These were constructed for transport on the Meuse river, which has larger locks, especially between Verdun and Givet.

A French péniche has even less sheer than a Belgian one and a very round stern with the rudder attached to the rear end rather than under the stern. After World War II a great number of them were built in Germany and sent to France as war reparation.

The Dutch péniche has a less round stern and a bit more sheer than the Belgian one.

A wet péniche has to take on water as ballast when navigating unladen. Especially in the Belgian and French types, the péniche's full stern provides a higher buoyancy and insufficient water around the propeller when empty.

== Trivia ==
- Because it is a displacement barge, a péniche is not a fast vessel. A popular saying among owners is that it will hardly move forward when laden or backwards when empty.

== See also ==
- Luxe motor
- Hotel barge
