= Classification of European Inland Waterways =

Standards determining vessel sizes on rivers and canals of Europe

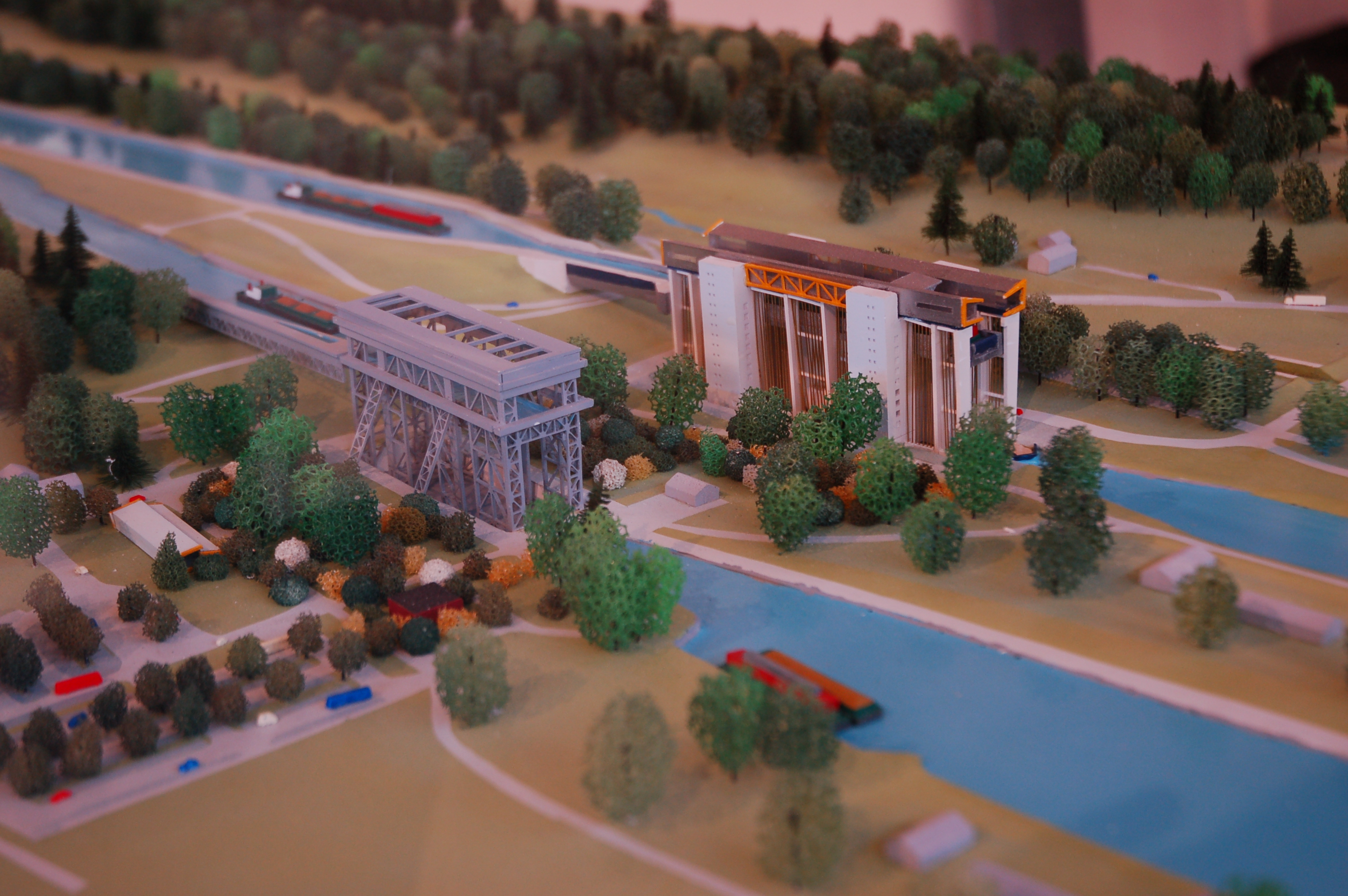
Structures such as the Niederfinow Boat Lift limit the dimensions of vessels.

The Classification of European Inland Waterways is a set of standards for interoperability of large navigable waterways forming part of the Trans-European Inland Waterway network within Continental Europe and Russia. It was created by the European Conference of Ministers of Transport (ECMT; French: Conférence européenne des ministres des Transports, CEMT) in 1992.

This inland waterway classes agreed on by the commission are referred to as CEMT Class I–VII. These classes refer to the dimensions of ships that should be able to use a canal. For their height, the classification determines the minimum air draft of bridges on the waterway. The dimensions of structures like bridges, locks and boat lifts relate very directly to the size of vessels. However, for the canals themselves, this relation depends on local circumstances.

== Early standardization ==
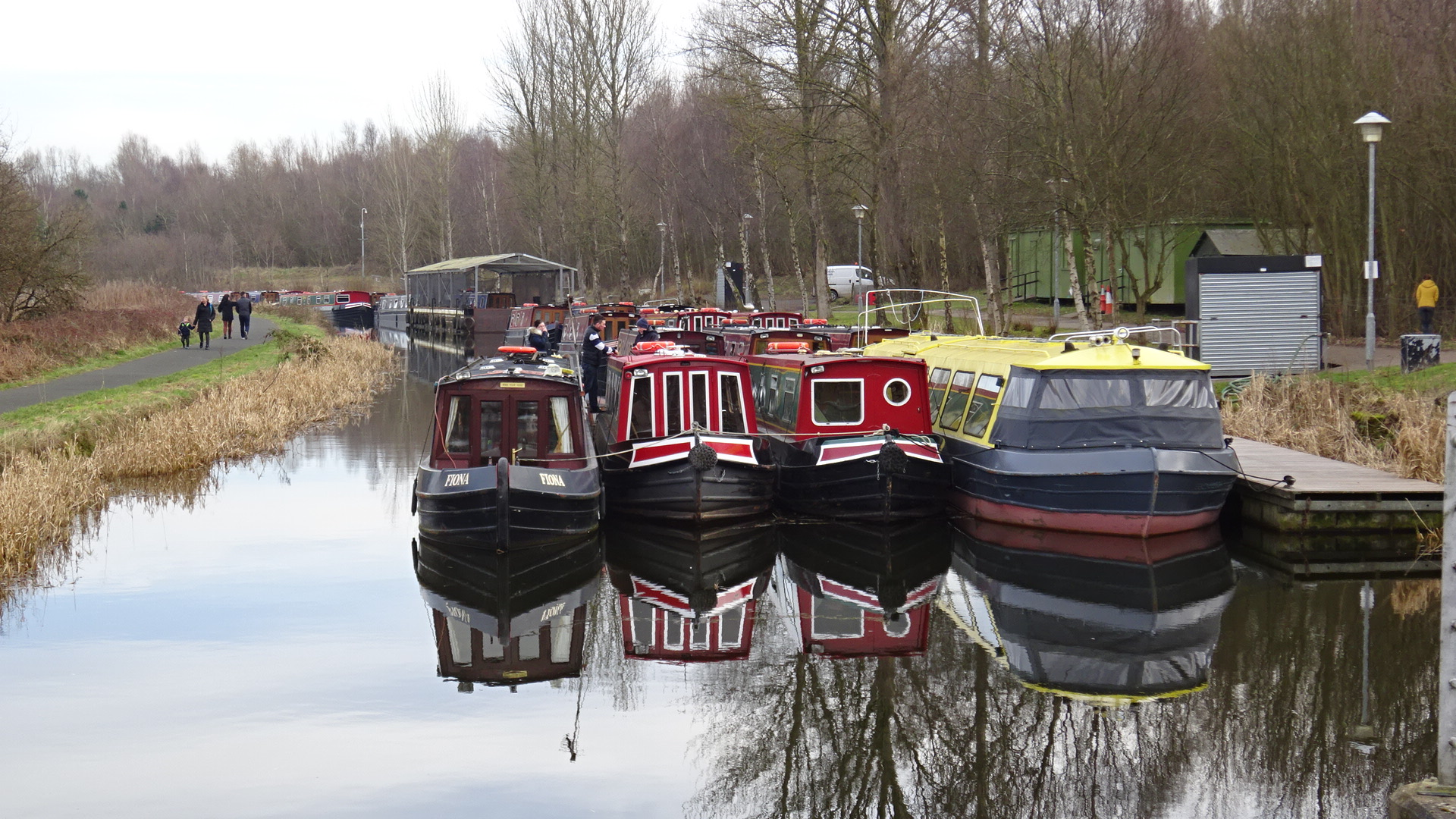
Narrowboats and a Widebeam in the UK

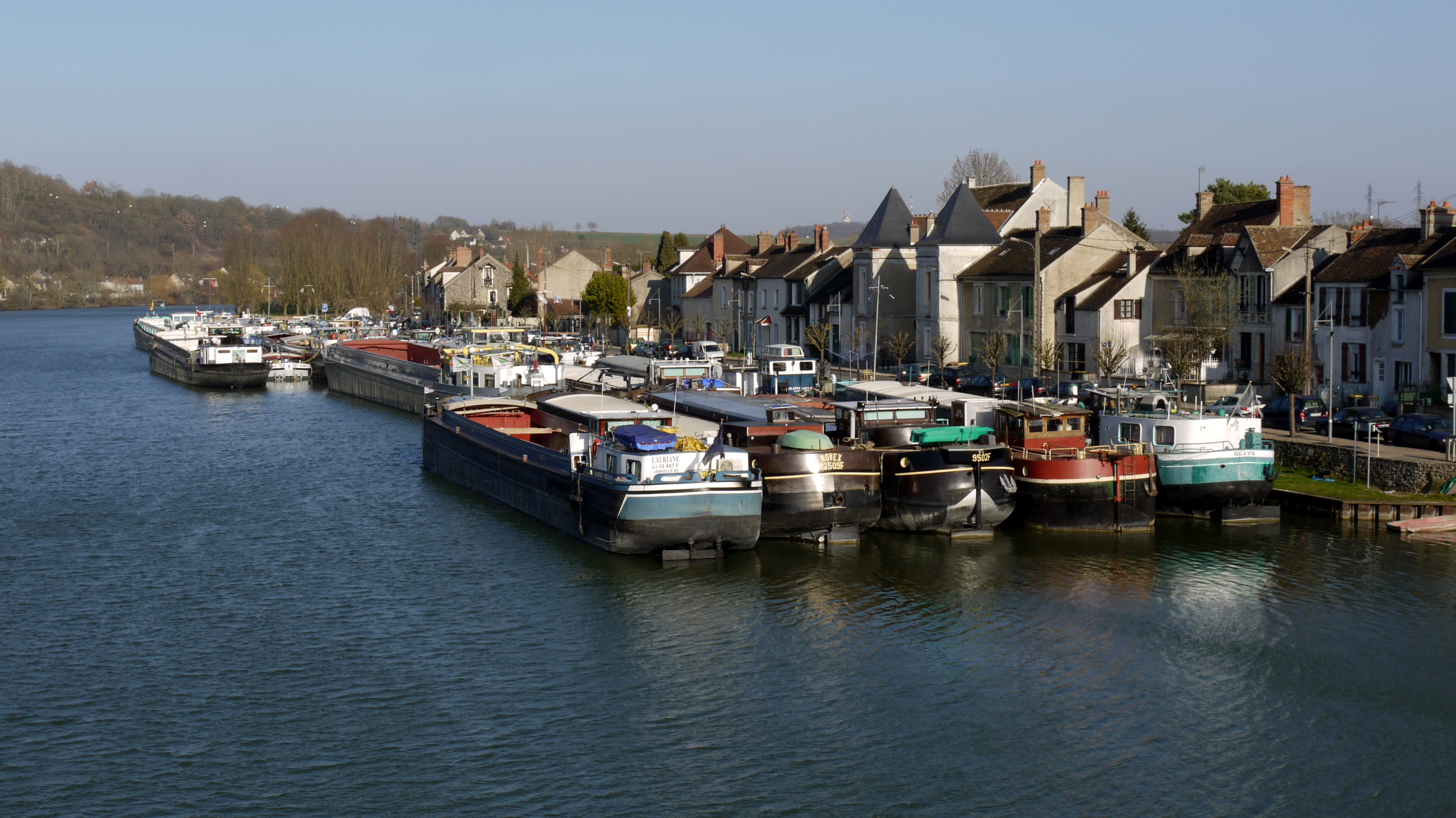
Péniches in Saint-Mammès

The need to standardize the size of inland waterways is related to the later stages of industrialization. The development of the British canal system started in the mid-18th century. It led to canals and locks of many different sizes. This became a problem when businessmen wanted to use the canals for long-distance transport. On the other hand, there was some kind of standardization. The usual beam of boats fit for canals and rivers was 14 feet (4.27 metres). On most canals, it was 7 feet (2.13 metres). Just before World War I, a government commission advised to upgrade and standardize the four principal waterways known as 'the cross'. It probably thought of 100 ton barges.

In France, the Freycinet program was approved in 1879. It provided for:

- the nationalization of most inland waterways;
- their improvement and standardization; and
- new canals of about 800 miles (1300 km) length.

It led to a big increase in inland navigation. The 1879 law that established the Freycinet gauge, which shows similarities with how the CEMT worked in the 1950s. The law established that there were 30 main waterways (lignes principales) in France. These had to be 2 m deep. Locks had to be 38.50 m long and 5.20 m wide. Air draft below bridges had to be at least 3.70 m. The law would be executed as means became available.

In Germany several types of barges developed based on the main waterways. The older types were based on the rivers. Near the Rhine there were e.g. the Mainschiff and Moselschiff. In the east, there were types like the Finow-Masskahn and the Breslauer Masskahn. Newer types could be found on the canals in the west of Germany. Here, the 'French' Peniche and the 'Belgian' Kempenaar appeared. The most important types the 600-770t type based on the Dortmund–Ems Canal and the 1350t type based on the Rhine–Herne Canal. Together, these canals connected north and central Germany to the Rhine.

In the Netherlands, the Zuid-Willemsvaart was the first very long canal. It was completed in 1826 and was 18 m wide and 2.10 m deep, allowing a draft of 1.88 m. The locks were at least 50 m long and 7 m wide. After becoming independent, Belgium built the Kempische Vaart (Campine Canal) which connected to the Zuid-Willemsvaart and formed the connection between the Scheldt and the Meuse. This canal and most of its branches also got locks with 7 m wide gates and a useful length of between 50 and 56 m. Like the Zuid-Willemsvaart it was also 2.10 m deep. The Campine Barge (Kempenaar) was based on the dimnensions of these canals. The Albert Canal that opened in 1939 was much bigger.

== Classification ==
=== Standardization of major cross-border inland navigation ===
In 1953, the Council of ministers drew up a list of twelve inland waterway projects that were of European interest. These projects should be studied and be standardized. In October 1954, the council then called for standardization of these canals based on the 1,350t Rhine–Herne Canal barge.

It was of course important to agree on what this international standardization on a type of vessel meant. This is probably why in 1957, the council of ministers issued a table of five classes of European towed barges and four types of German self-propelled barges. These classes actually have an almost one on one relation with the later 1992 classification of inland waterways.

Principal measurements of European types of towed barges and German self-propelled barges in 1957
Types of European towed barges							Types of German self-propelled barges					
class	Type	Length	Beam	Draught	Height	Tonnage	Type	Length	Beam	Draught	Height	Tonnage
I	Péniche	38.5 m	5.00 m	2.20 m	3.55 m	300t	Theodor Bayer	38.5 m	5.05 m	2.30 m	3.50 m	274t
II	Kempenaar	50.0 m	6.60 m	2.50 m	4.20 m	600t	Oskar Teubert	53.0 m	6.29 m	2.50 m	3.90 m	562t
							Karl Vortisch	57.0 m	7.04 m	2.30 m	3.95 m	605t
III	Dortmund–Ems Canal barge	67.0 m	8.20 m	2.50 m	3.95 m	1,000t	Gustav Koenigs	67.0 m	8.20 m	2.50 m	3.90 m	930t
IV	Rhine–Herne Canal barge	80.0 m	9.50 m	2.80 m	4.40 m	1,350t	Johann Welker	80.0 m	9.50 m	2.50 m	4.40 m	1,289t
V	Big Rhine Boat	95.0 m	11.50 m	2.70 m	6.70 m	2,000t	N/a					

=== The 1992 classification ===
The official CEMT classification was issued in 1992. Class I corresponds to the historical Freycinet gauge. The larger river classification sizes are focused on convoys of barges propelled by a push-tug. Most of the canals of the United Kingdom have smaller locks and would fall below the dimensions in the European classification system.

In 2004, the standards were extended with four smaller sizes RA–RD covering recreational craft, which had originally been developed and proposed via PIANC. The proposal to add the recreational sizes was adopted by United Nations Economic Commission for Europe resolution 52.

In 2015 the European Court of Auditors published a rather critical report about the progress of the improvement of the European system of inland waterways. It concluded that the member states were not doing enough to facilitate the modal shift from road to waterway transport. Part of this was due to a failure to focus on eliminating the bottlenecks in the inland navigation network.

Type of inland waterways	Classes of navigable waterways	Motor vessels and barges					Pushed convoys				Minimum height under bridges (m)
Type of inland waterways	Classes of navigable waterways	Designation	Length (m)	Breadth (m)	Draught (m)	Tonnage (t)	Length (m)	Breadth (m)	Draught (m)	Tonnage (t)	Minimum height under bridges (m)
For recreational navigation	RA	Open boat	5.5	2.00	0.50						2.00
For recreational navigation	RB	Cabin cruiser	9.5	3.00	1.00						3.25
For recreational navigation	RC	Motor yacht	15.0	4.00	1.50						4.00
For recreational navigation	RD	Sailing boat	15.0	4.00	2.10						30.00
Of regional importance to east of Elbe	I	Gross Finow	41	4.7	1.40	180					3.0
Of regional importance to east of Elbe	II	BM–500	57	7.5–9.0	1.60	500–630					3.0
Of regional importance to east of Elbe	III		67–70	8.2–9.0	1.60–2.00	470–700	118–132	8.2–9.0	1.6–2.0	1,000–1,200	4.0
Of regional importance to west of Elbe	I	Barge	38.5	5.05	1.80–2.20	250–400					4.0
Of regional importance to west of Elbe	II	Kampine-Barge	50.0–55.0	6.6	2.50	400–650					4.0–5.0
Of regional importance to west of Elbe	III	Gustav Koenigs	67.0–80.0	8.2	2.50	650–1,000					4.0–5.0
Of international importance	IV	Johann Welker	80.0–85.0	9.5	2.50	1,000–1,500	85	9.5	2.5–2.8	1,250–1,450	5.25 or 7.00
Of international importance	Va	Large Rhine class					95–110	11.4	2.5–4.5	1,600–3,000	5.25 or 7.00 or 9.10
Of international importance	Vb	1×2 convoy					172–185	11.4	2.5–4.5	3,200–6,000	5.25 or 7.00 or 9.10
Of international importance	VIa	2×1 convoy					95–110	22.8	2.5–4.5	3,200–6,000	7.00 or 9.10
Of international importance	VIb	2×2 convoy	140.0	15.0	3.90		185–195	22.8	2.5–4.5	6,400–12,000	7.00 or 9.10
Of international importance	VIc	2×3 convoy					270–280	22.8	2.5–4.0	9,600–18,000	9.10
Of international importance	VIc	3×2 convoy					195–200	33.0–34.2	2.5–4.5	9,600–18,000	9.10
Of international importance	VII	3×3 convoy					285	33.0–34.2	2.5–4.5	14,500–27,000	9.10

== See also ==
- Unified Deep Water System of European Russia (110-210m length max, min lock beam 14.3m, 2,5-3.5-4m draft)
- Baltimax (15,2m draft, the same as NeoPanamax)
- Bangkok Port (172m length, 25m beam -with special permit 30m-, 8,2m draft), Bangkokmax of 1944 TEU
- Seawaymax (USA Great Lakes docks, 8,08m draft), Chesapeake & Delaware Canal (draft 10,7m)
- Paraguay River (almost 2,5m in middle river, 1,6m in upper river)
- Grand Canal (China)
- Saimaa Canal (Finland, max length 82,5 m, beam 12,6m, draft 4,2m)
- Rhine–Main–Danube Canal for ships of 110x11,45x2,5m (up to 135m length with a special permit)

== Publications including the full classification table ==
- 2012 Map of the European Inland Waterway Network, United Nations Economic Commission for Europe (4th edition, Geneva 2012), without the recreational navigation categories. Waterway Standards.
- Waterway page including another table of the European classification and a 2017 version of the above map
