= Henrichenburg boat lift =

Coordinates: 51°37′7.96″N 7°20′01.13″E

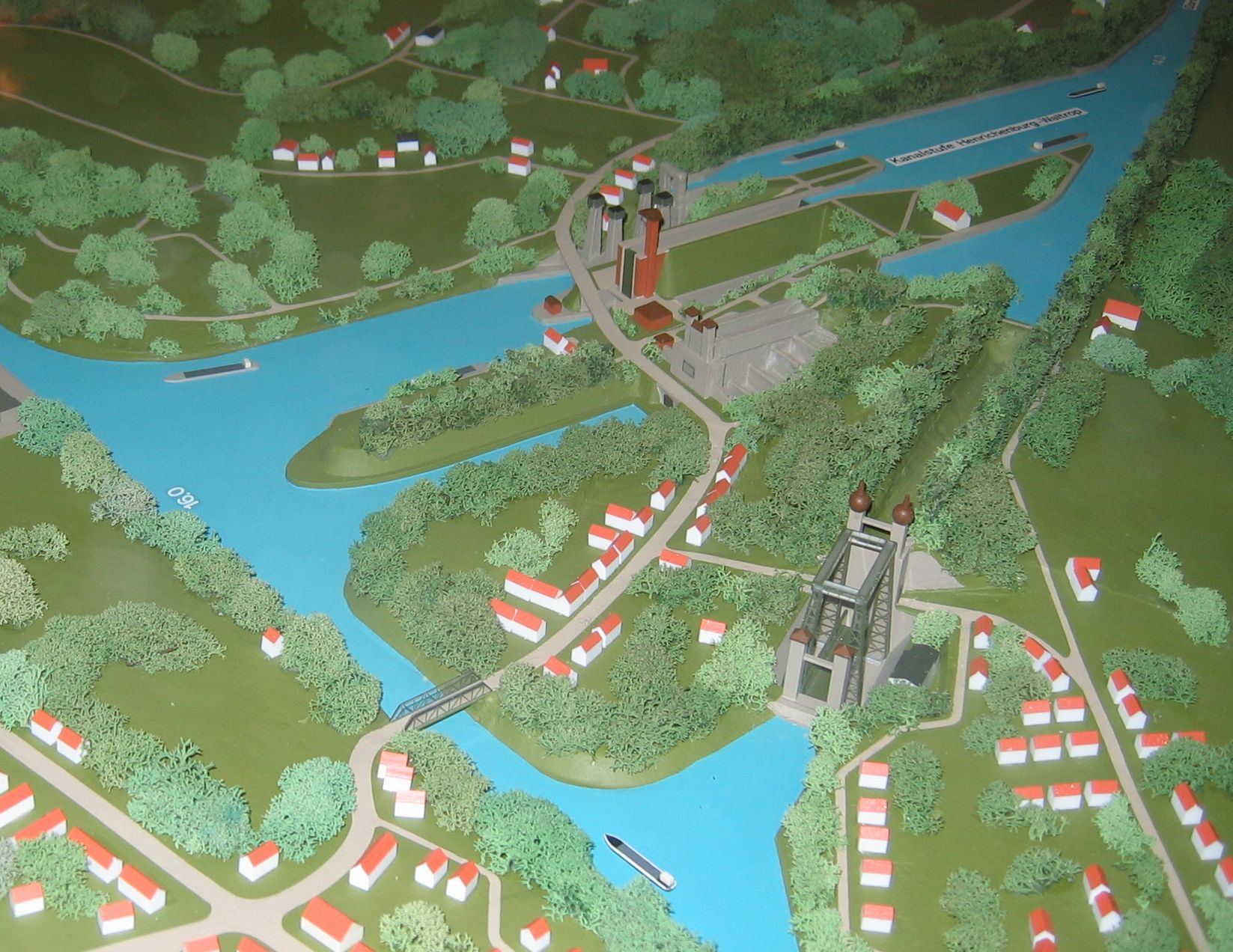
Model of the Waltrop Lock Park

The Henrichenburg boat lift facilitates a change in elevation of the Dortmund-Ems-Kanal in Waltrop-Oberwiese. The boat lift is part of the Waltrop Lock Park (Schleusenpark), which includes the old Henrichenburg boat lift built in 1899, a disused shaft lock from 1912, the new boat lift built in 1962 and a modern ship lock from 1989.

The Henrichenburg boat lift is a popular destination for cyclists along the canals of the northern Ruhr Area.

== The old boat lift ==
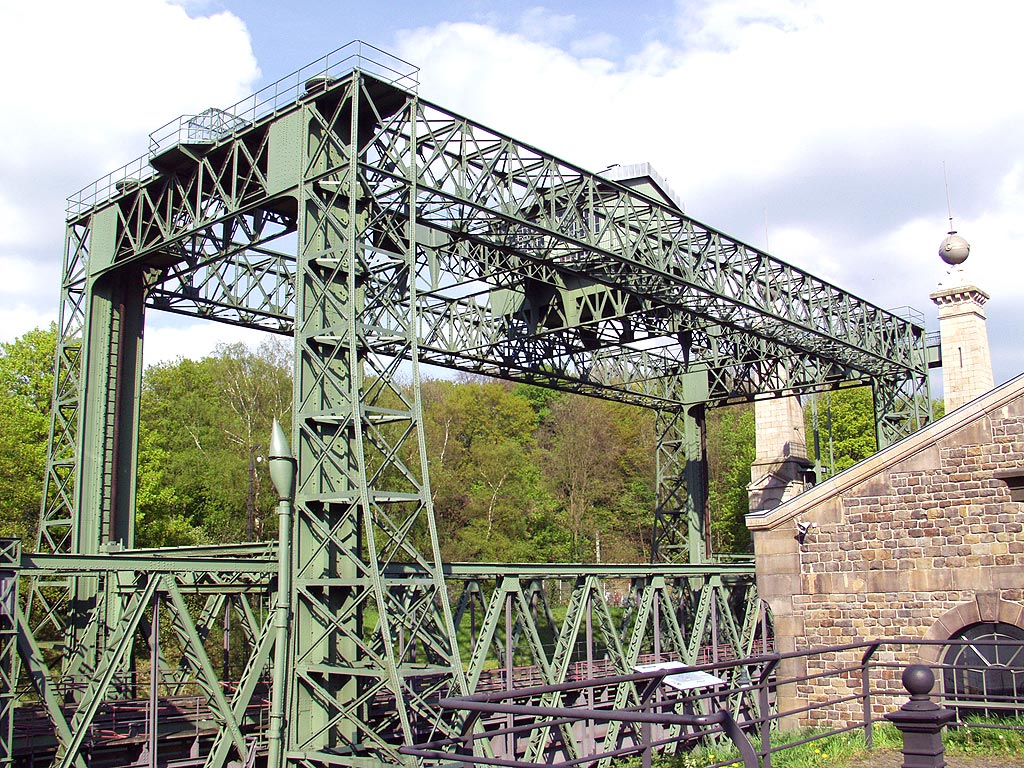
The old boat lift

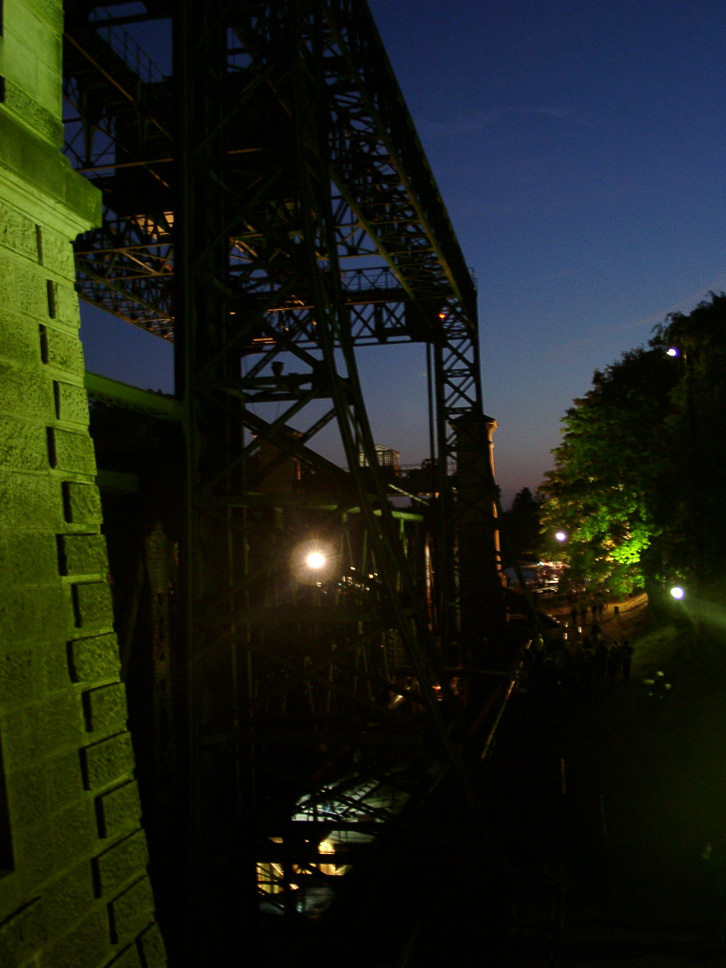
Night time view of the old boat lift in 2003

The old boat lift was opened in 1899. It was an important structure on the Dortmund-Ems-Kanal without which it would not have been possible to navigate to Dortmund Port. The lift was the biggest and most spectacular structure on the old Dortmund-Ems-Kanal. It was inaugurated by Kaiser Wilhelm II on 11 August 1899.

=== Purpose ===
The lift was able to accommodate the then usual Boat on the Dortmund-Ems-Kanal, 67 metres long, 8.2 metres wide, with a draft of 2 metres and lift it through a height of 14 metres to the level of the Dortmund Port. It could accommodate vessels of up to 350 tonnes. A complete descent or lift cycle, including entry and exit, took about 45 minutes. The actual lowering/lifting only took two and a half minutes. This was much faster than possible using ordinary locks. This method of raising boats also conserved water at the upper elevation which relied entirely on water pumped from the lower elevation for its supply.

=== Technology ===
This technically very interesting construction managed to lift approximately 1000 tonnes of ship and water filled trough using a relatively small amount of power. The trough was supported by 5 cylindrical floats each immersed in 40 metre deep water-filled wells. The lift from the floats was the same as the load of the water filled trough therefore, only a small electric motor sufficient to overcome friction and viscous resistance was needed to set the trough in motion in either direction. Four steel worm gears, 20 metres long and 280 mm in diameter were used to direct the trough in the appropriate course.

The old lift was closed shortly after the opening of the new lift. A year later in 1963 an attempt was made to restart the old lift. It was found that the trough had tilted and that it could no longer be moved into either the fully up or fully down positions. The lift remains in this condition today and is conserved as part of a museum.

=== Museum ===
After the closure of the old lift it was decided in 1979 to develop the lift as part of the Westphalian industrial museum. The lift was restored and reconstructed without bringing it back into use. The lower dock of the old lift is used as a marina.

The old lift has an iron framework construction with five float chambers. The trough and the upper and lower control towers are accessible. In the former boiler and machine house, machines, models and pictures can be seen. In the lower dock are the former police and fireboat Cerberus of 1930 and the motorvessel Franz-Christian of 1929 with an exhibition of working life on board in the cargo hold. In the 400m long canal adjoining the upper dock there is a collection of historical ships and a loading dock along with other exhibits.

The Westphalian Industrial Museum is on the Dortmund-Ems-Kanal cycle route, the Emscher-Way.

== The new boat lift ==
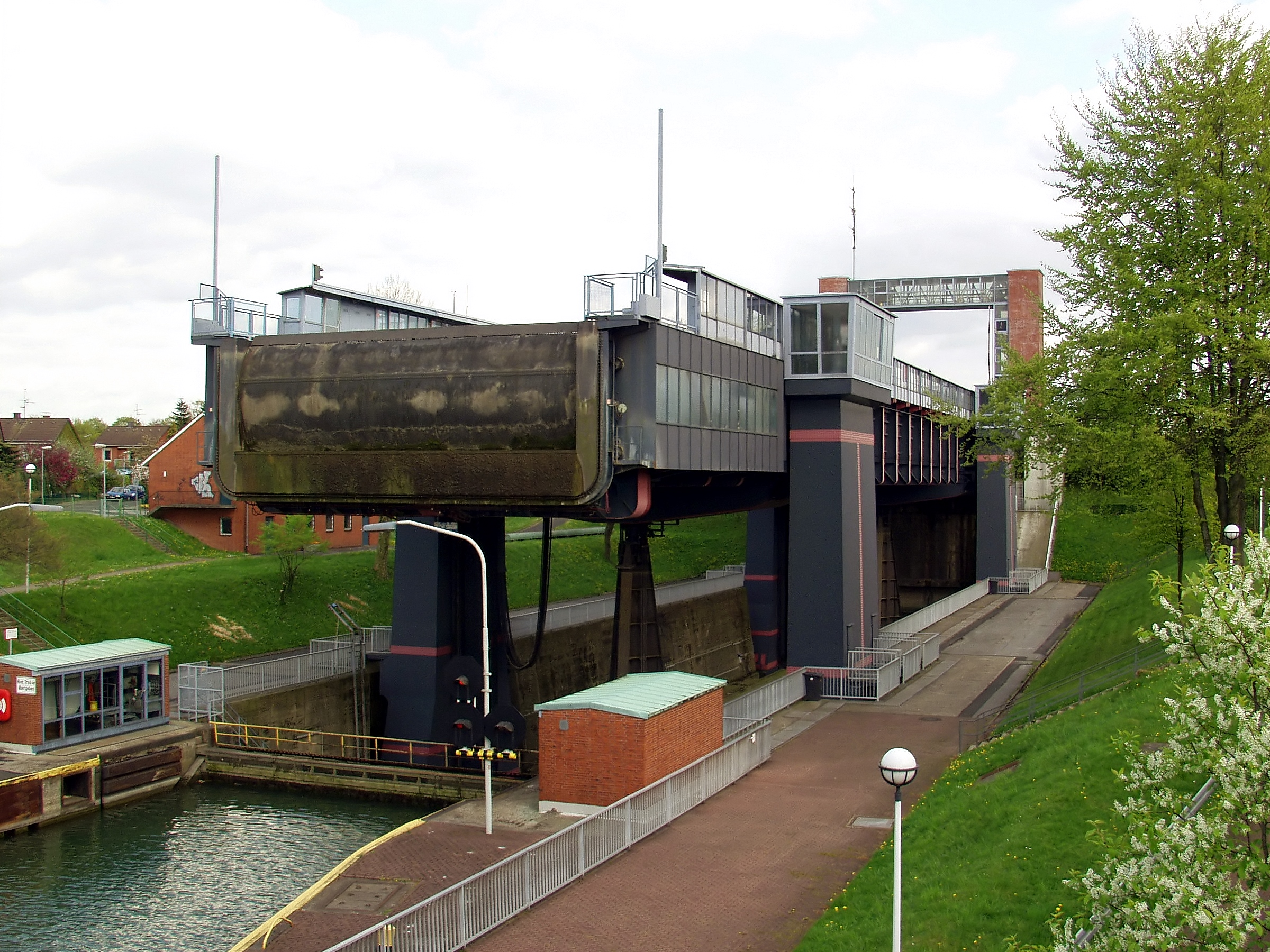
The new boat lift

The new boat lift was opened in 1962 and has a trough length of 90 metres, a width of 12 metres, and a draft of 3 metres. It was capable of lifting vessels of up to 1350 tonnes. This lift utilizes the same construction principles as the old lift but using only two floats in two float chambers.

The new lift soon became too small for the navigation's requirements and a new ship lock allowing boats 190 metres long and 12 metres wide, allowing a 4-metre displaced depth was built next to the lift in 1989.

The new lift was taken out of use in December 2005 because of technical problems. The lift may not be repaired on the grounds of cost and the decreased usage of Dortmund Port. Without the lift, any problems or maintenance requirements on the modern lock would bring about the closure of Dortmund Port, as is the case in the summer of 2021, when visitors to the site saw the lock gates dismantled and lying in the chamber for repair, causing a six-week stoppage.

== See also ==
- Schiffshebewerk Henrichenburg, article on the German-language Wikipedia from which this article had been translated
- List of boat lifts
- Strépy-Thieu boat lift, Le Rœulx, Belgium
- Peterborough lift lock, Ontario, Canada
- Anderton boat lift, Anderton with Marbury, United Kingdom
- Falkirk Wheel, Scotland, United Kingdom
