= Dortmund Port =

Coordinates: 51°31′33″N 7°26′34″E

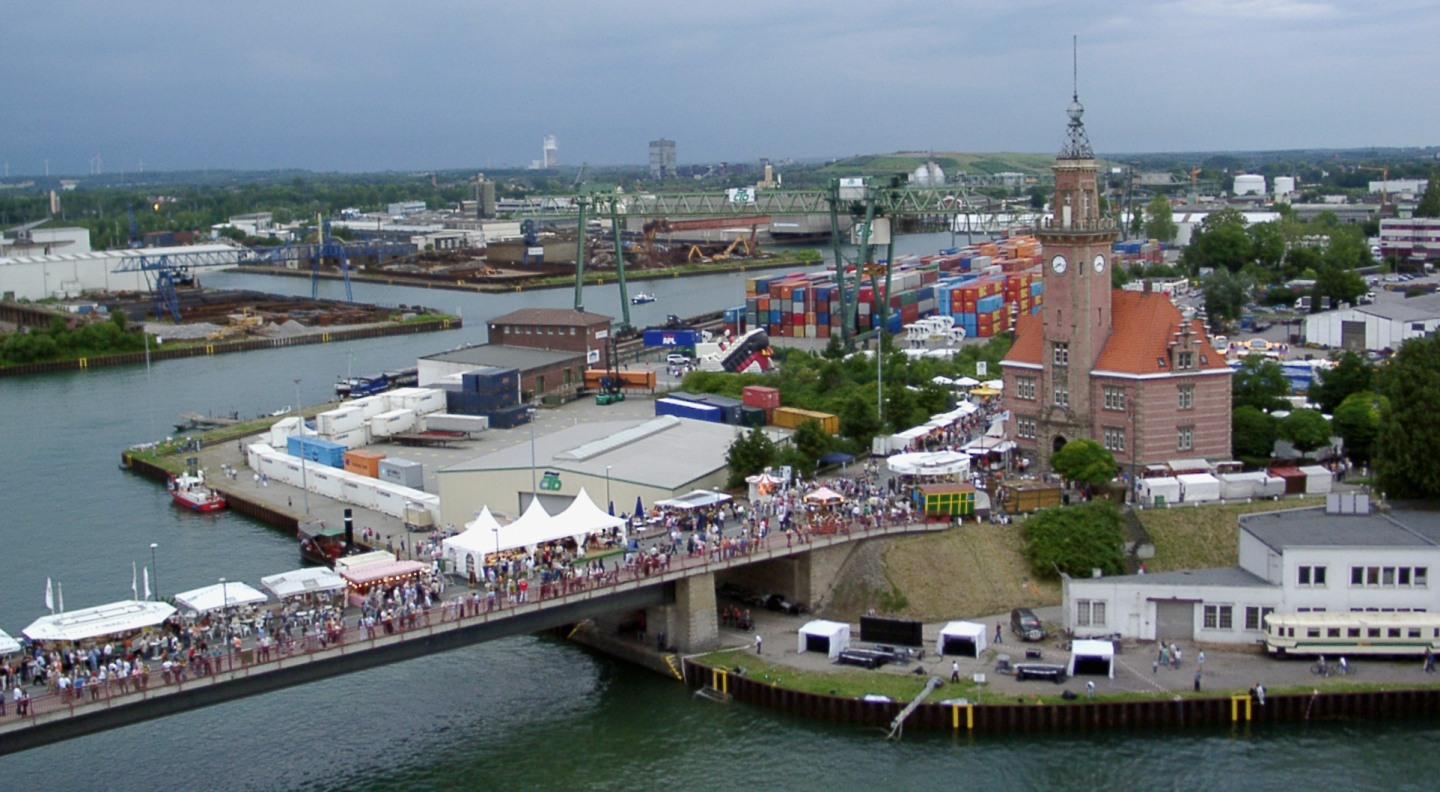
Dortmund Port

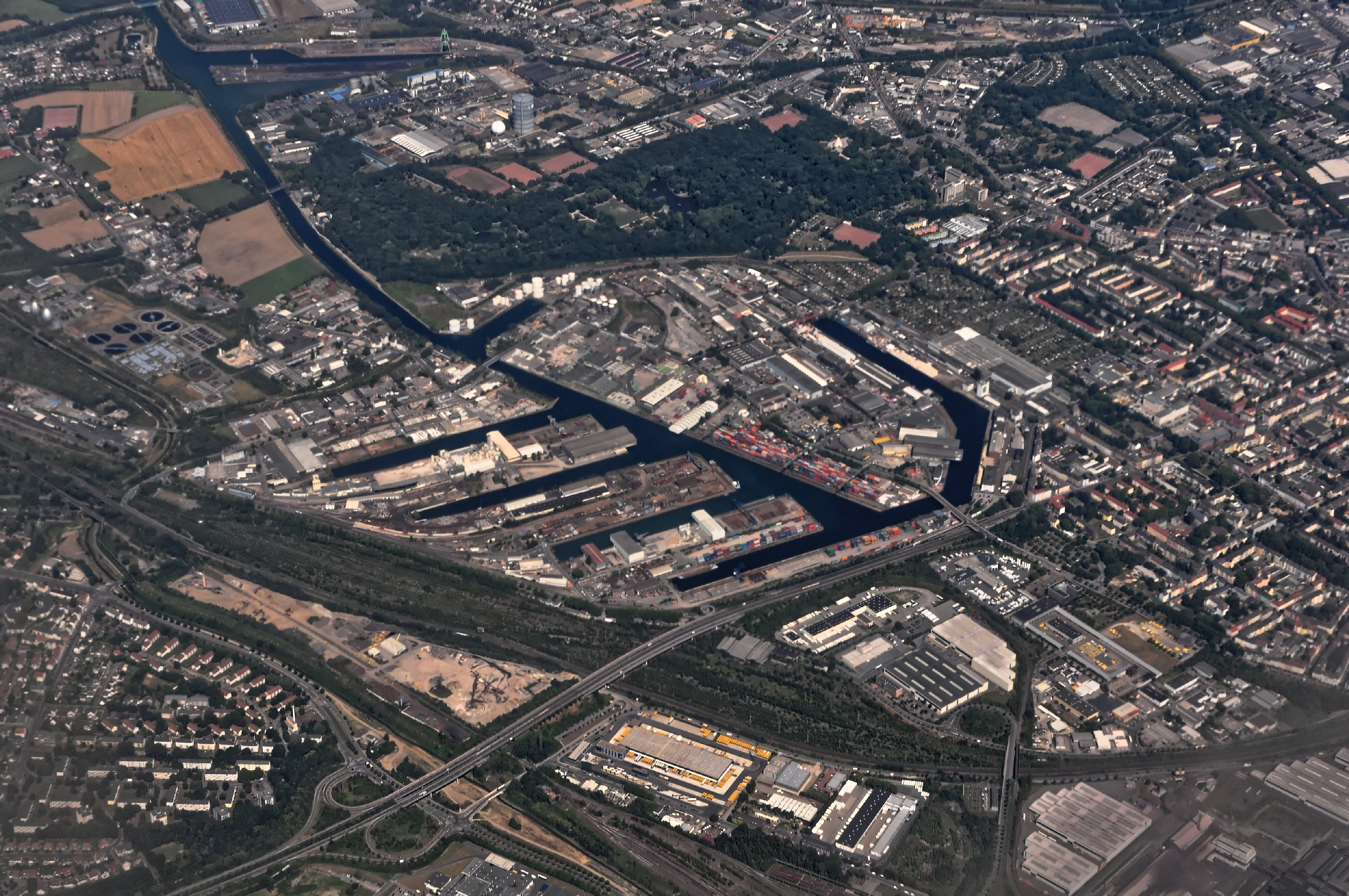
Dortmund Port 2013 aerial photo

Construction on Dortmund's port which terminates the Dortmund-Ems Canal connecting Dortmund to the North Sea started in 1895. It was opened 1899 by Kaiser Wilhelm. At the beginning of the 20th century it was mainly used for the import and export of wheat, coal and ore. The port was expanded in the 1920s and 1930s by adding new docks as well as on the administrative infrastructure (Dortmunder Hafenamt). Today Dortmund Port is the biggest European canal port with 10 docks and a pier length of 11 km.

Gaining its greatest importance after WW II, in 1972 6.2 million tonnes of good were shipped over the port. But even the completion of the container port in 1987 could not stop the gradual decline of the port resulting from the extinction of the coal and steel industries in Dortmund.

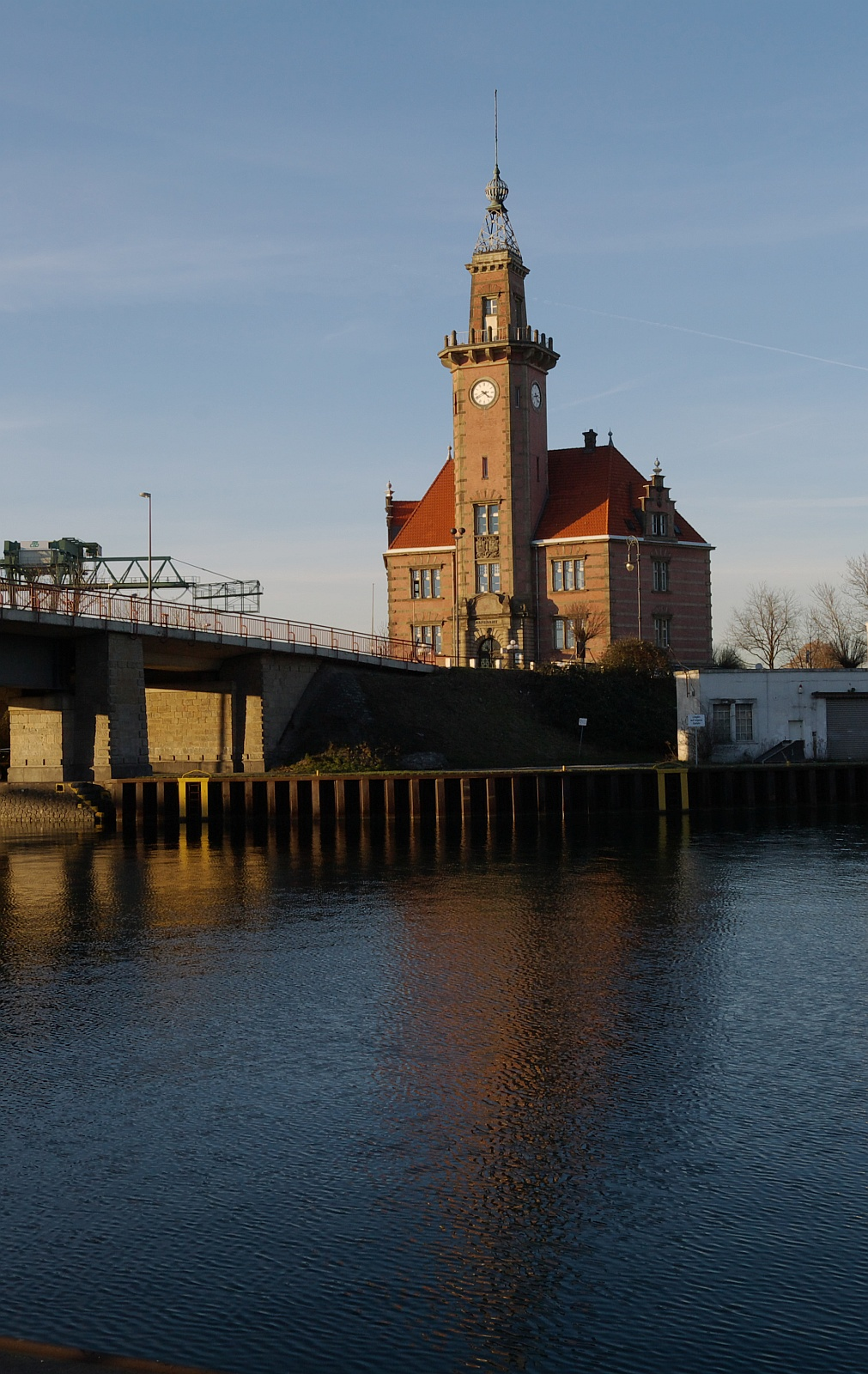
The landmarked old harbor master's office (Altes Hafenamt)

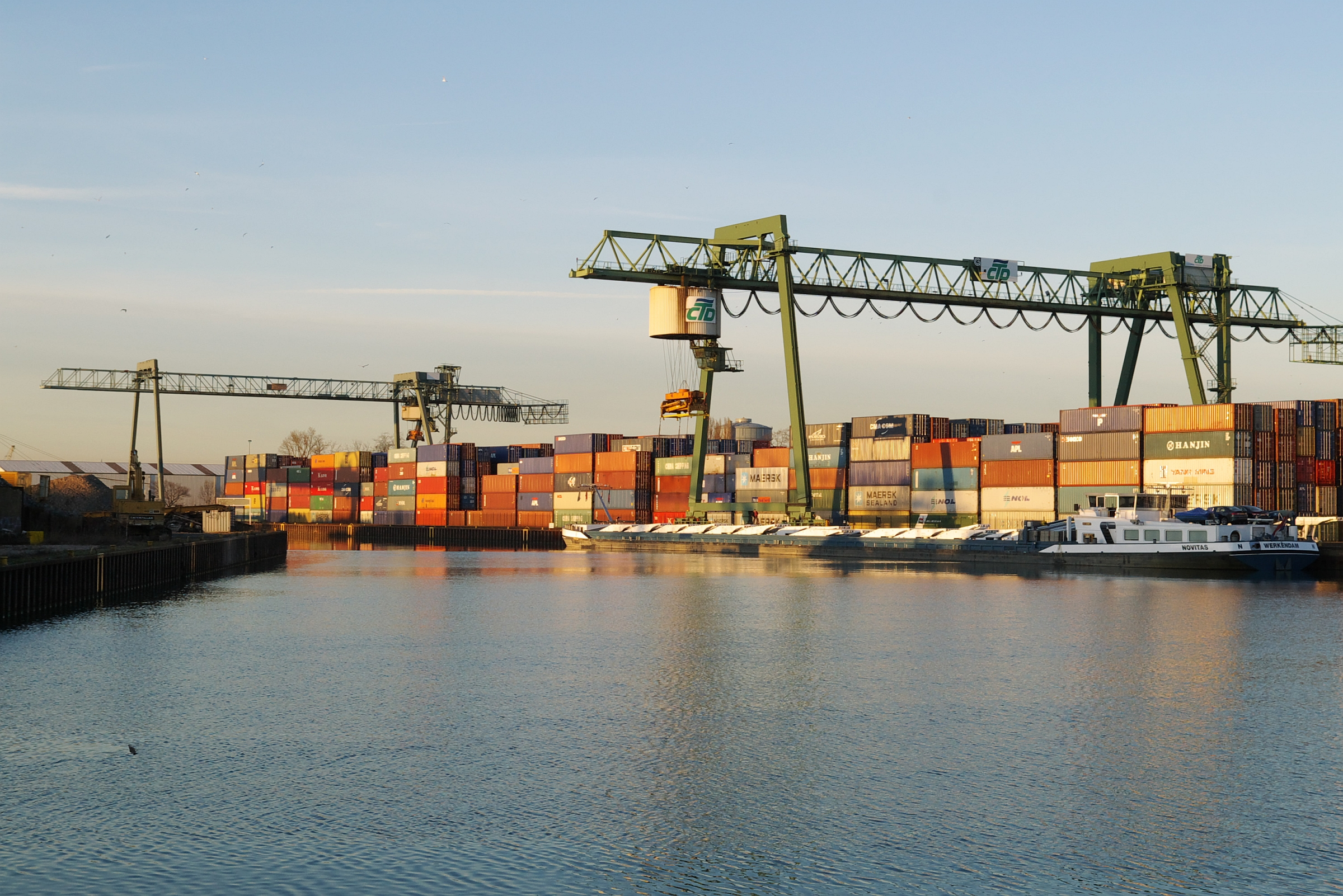
Container shipment

2.96 million tons of freight were shipped over the Dortmund Port in 2007, an increase of 7.1 percent compared to the previous year.

Shipment by goods (2006)
good	tonnage
Building materials	934,000 t
Mineral oil	647,000 t
Container	523,000 t
Iron and steel products	334,000 t
Scrap and recyclable waste	216,000 t
Coal and coke	272,000 t
Others	34,000 t

In the process of restructuring the industry in the Ruhrgebiet and in Dortmund, local politicians are looking for new ways to use the old port. Planned projects are the construction of a marina and high-quality areas for recreational use and residential redevelopment on the water.

In 2005 a first location for recreational use was established.

== See also ==
- Duisburg Port
