= Olfen =

- Town
- Coat of arms

- Location of Olfen within Coesfeld district
- Interactive map of Olfen
- Location within Germany Location within North Rhine-Westphalia
- Coordinates: 51°43′N 7°23′E
- Country: Germany
- State: North Rhine-Westphalia
- Admin. region: Münster
- District: Coesfeld

Government
  - Mayor (2020–25): Wilhelm Sendermann (CDU)

Area
  - Total: 52.43 km^{2} (20.24 sq mi)
- Elevation: 45–80 m (148–262 ft)

Population (2025-12-31)
  - Total: 13,110
  - Density: 250.0/km^{2} (647.6/sq mi)
- Time zone: UTC+01:00 (CET)
  - Summer (DST): UTC+02:00 (CEST)
- Postal codes: 59399
- Dialling codes: 02595, 02592 (part of Vinnums)
- Vehicle registration: COE/LH
- Website: www.olfen.de

Olfen (German pronunciation: [ˈɔlfn̩]) is a town in the district of Coesfeld, in North Rhine-Westphalia, Germany.

== History ==
Bishop Wolfhelm, who originated from the Ulfloa Oberhof, gave the small town its name in 889. Wolfhelm was the fourth bishop of "Mimingardeford", today called Münster.

The fire disaster of 1857, in which 142 houses were destroyed, has gone down as the "Great Fire of Olfen" in Olfen's history books.

== Population ==
Historical population

Year	Pop.	±% p.a.
1965	6,271	—
1970	6,731	+1.43%
1975	7,643	+2.57%
1980	8,300	+1.66%
1985	8,649	+0.83%
1990	8,732	+0.19%
1995	9,936	+2.62%

Year	Pop.	±% p.a.
2000	11,721	+3.36%
2005	12,252	+0.89%
2010	12,215	−0.06%
2015	12,490	+0.45%
2020	13,014	+0.83%
2025	13,110	+0.15%

Source: Landesdatabank Nordrhein-Westfalen

== Buildings ==
Interesting sights include St. Vitus church, a castle and a historic sawmill.

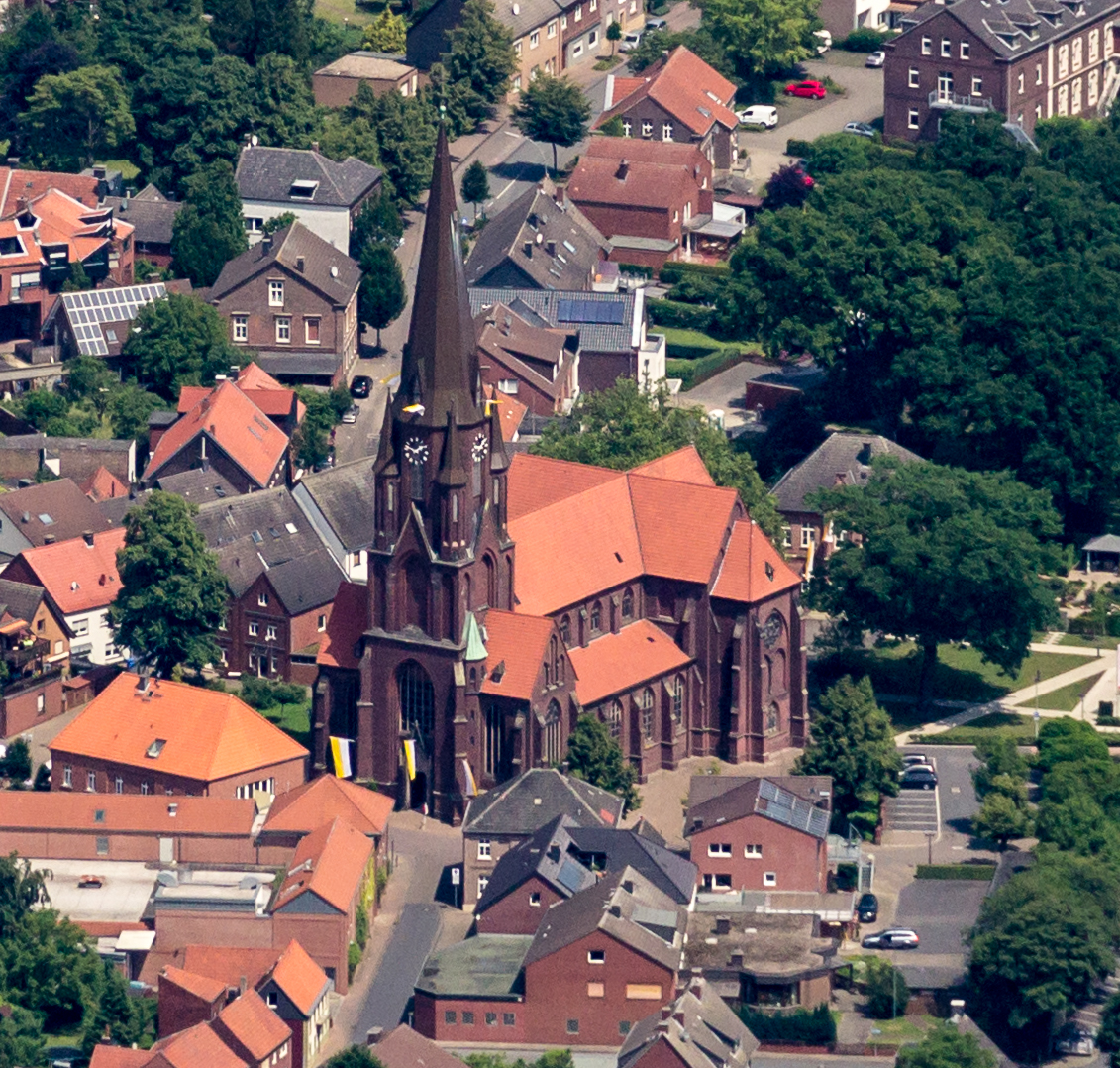
Olfen, St. Vitus church

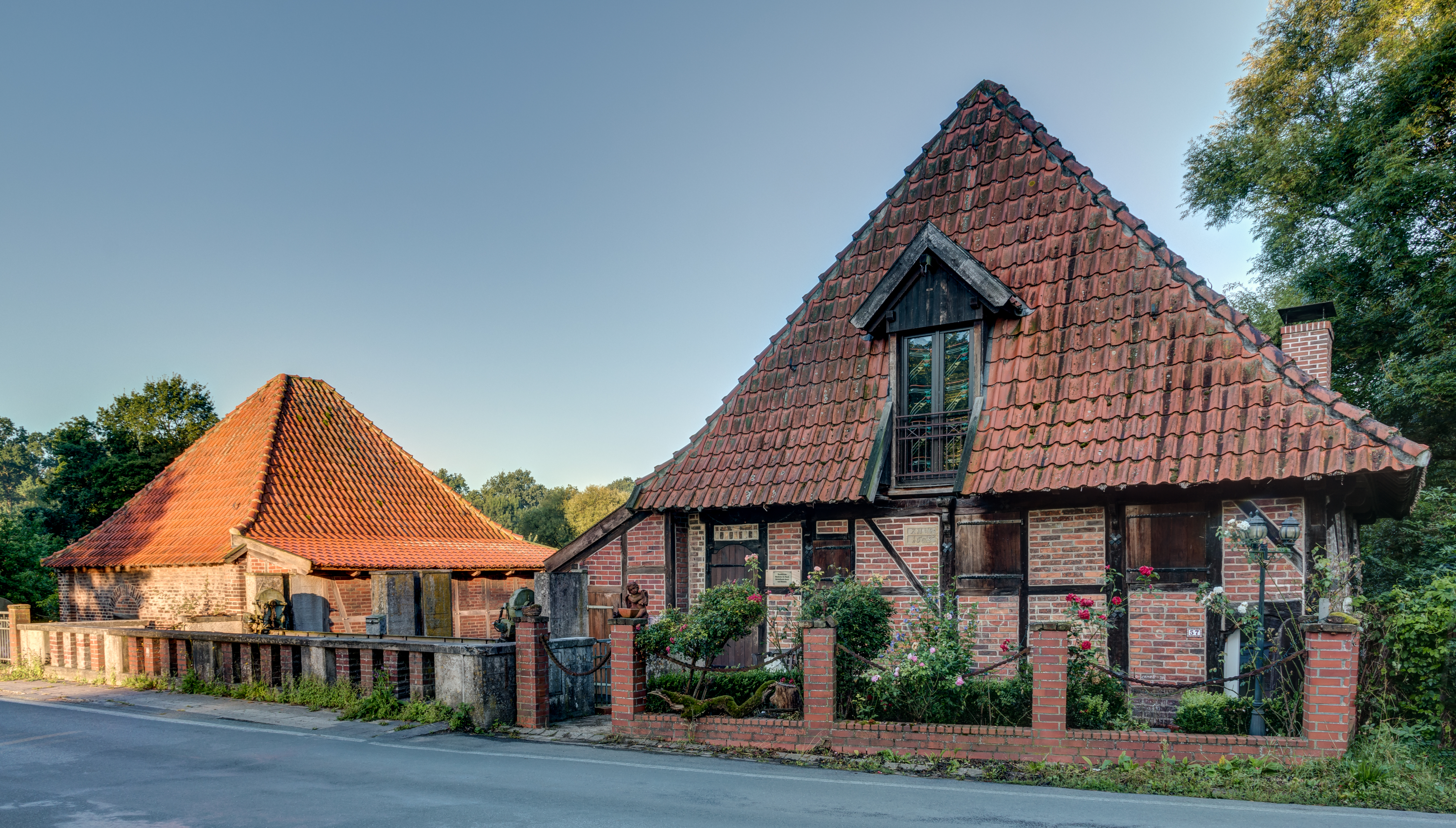
Olfen, Füchteln mill

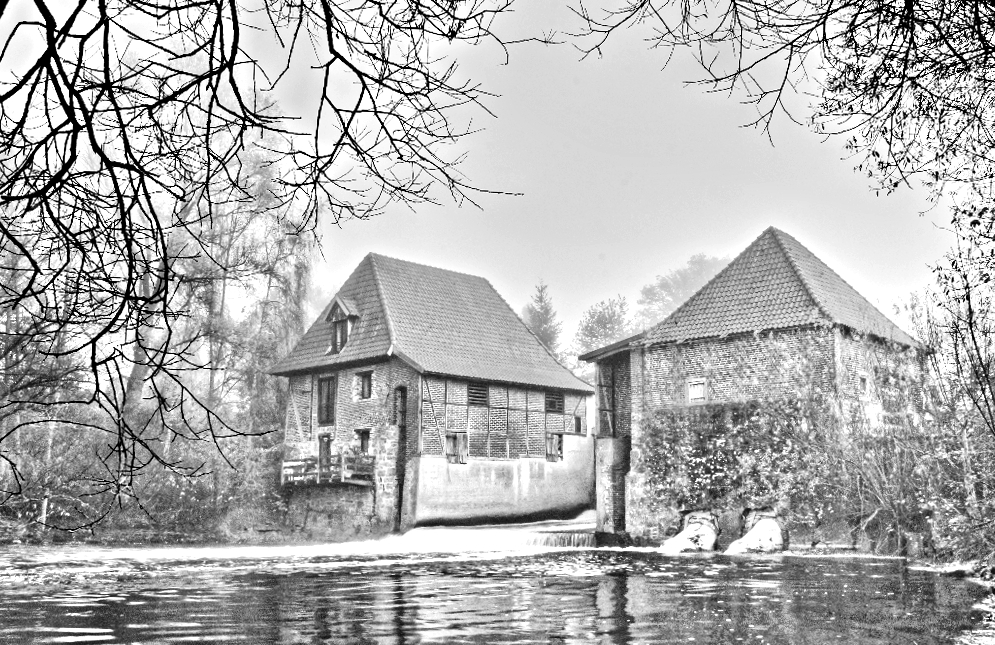
Füchteln mill on a foggy day (art project)

== Politics ==
Wilhelm Sendermann (CDU) was elected for mayor in September 2015 with 87.4% of the vote. He was re-elected in 2020.

== Notable people ==
- Thomas Hoof (born 1948), founder of Manufactum
- Günter Schlierkamp (born 1970), professional bodybuilder

== Town partnerships ==
- La Grange, United States
