= Choose life =

Choose life may refer to:

== Music ==
- Choose Life, an album by Sandie Shaw, 1983
- Choose Life (Debby Boone album), 1985
- Choose Life, a song by Tzant under the name of PF Project featuring Ewan McGregor, released on Trainspotting #2: Music from the Motion Picture, Vol. #2, 1997
- Choose Life, a song by Big Tent Revival, 1999
- Choose Life, Uvacharta Bachayim, a oratorio, 2011
  - Choose Life, Uvacharta Bachayim, a studio album recording of the oratorio, 2011

== Other ==
- "Choose life", a slogan of the suicide prevention movement
- Choose Life: A Dialogue a 1976 book coauthored by Daisaku Ikeda and British historian Arnold J. Toynbee
- CHOOSE LIFE, a message t-shirt created by Katharine Hamnett worn by various musicians
- Choose Life license plates, available in 32 U.S. states to express an anti-abortion message
