= Mona Lyn Reese =

American composer (born 1951)

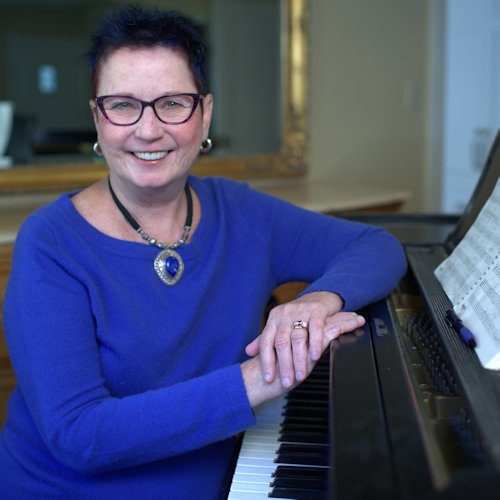
- Composer Mona Lyn Reese
- Born: August 24, 1951 (age 75); Morris, Minnesota
- Occupation: Composer
- Writing career
- Language: English
- Website: www.monareese.com

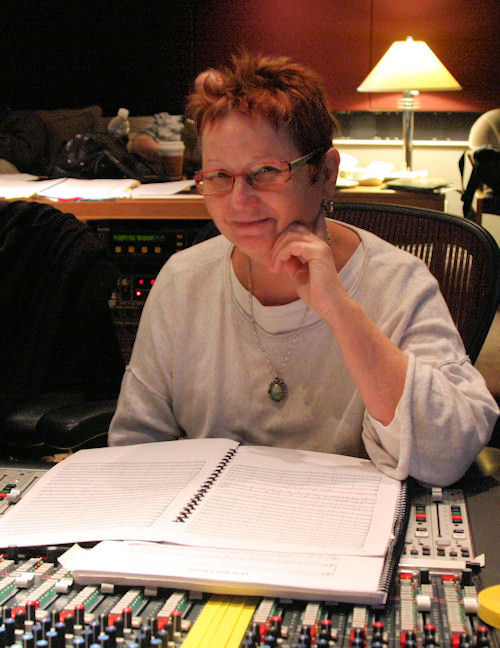
Mona Lyn Reese at Skywalker Sound in Marin County, California.

Mona Lyn Reese (born August 24, 1951) is an American composer, best known for her operas and choral music. Her work is melodic and accessible with an emphasis on driving or complex rhythms, movement, and contrasting textures. Her music communicates and expresses emotions traditionally or experimentally without allowing a prevailing fashion to dictate style, form, or harmony.

== Biography ==
Reese was born in Morris, Minnesota, and began piano lessons at age six, flute lessons at age eight, and taught herself guitar at age 13. She attended the University of Minnesota, Morris, (BA), where she also studied flute performance, composition and French. She continued at the University of Kansas (MM Composition), writing Love Songs to the Moon and Piano Moods. She began composing professionally in 1975, with music for woodwind quintet and percussion to a documentary film on Kansas. Reese was Composer in residence at the Minnesota Opera from 1991 to 1999, where she arranged works for the Minnesota Opera touring company and conducted educational residencies to help students write and produce original operas.

In 1993, Reese was awarded a Faith Partners Residency sponsored by the American Composers Forum and the Otto Bremer Foundation. During this residency, she collaborated with librettist Delores Dufner OSB, on the dramatic oratorio Choose Life, Uvacharta Bachayim which premiered at the Basilica of Saint Mary, Minneapolis (Teri Larson, Music Director) in 1994. The following year, the Otto Bremer Foundation gave Reese an additional grant to write a symphonic version which was nominated for a Pulitzer Prize in 1995. The symphonic version was performed by the Billings Symphony Orchestra & Chorale (Uri Barnea, Music Director) in 1996, and was also performed by the Basilica of Saint Mary, Minneapolis (Teri Larson, Music Director), as part of the “Basilica 2000” series. In 2011, the San José Chamber Orchestra and Chorus released Choose Life, Uvacharta Bachayim (album), recorded at Skywalker Sound in Marin County, California. In 2014, the San José Chamber Orchestra and Chorus performed a suite from Choose Life, Uvacharta Bachayim in the San José City Hall Rotunda.

Reese received a Continental Harmony commission in 2000, created by the American Composers Forum and the National Endowment for the Arts to enable small to mid-size communities in each state to commission new pieces for the millennium. Continental Harmony was an official partner of the White House Millennium Council. Reese composed Suite Carroll County for the Carroll County Orchestra and Chorale in Carrollton, Ohio.

Reese's opera The Three Fat Women of Antibes received its premier performance with orchestra in May 2009 by the San José State University Opera Workshop (Michel Singher, Music Director, Daniel Helfgot, Director). The opera, written with her husband and librettist Thomas Hassing, is a humorous chamber opera for four singers based on the W. Somerset Maugham short story of the same name. The opera premiered in Minneapolis, Minnesota, in 1998. Other performances include the University of Kansas Opera Studio (2002), Goat Hall Productions (San Francisco, California, 2003, selections), and Gregory Weist (Munich, Germany, 2005, selections).

In 2003, Reese was selected as a Studium Scholar-in-Residence at Saint Benedict's Monastery (St. Joseph, MN). During her time there, Reese planned the chamber orchestra composition Little Pieces from My Heart, commissioned by the San José Chamber Orchestra.

Reese’s orchestral works have been performed by orchestras throughout the United States including the Minnesota Orchestra, the Livingston Symphony Orchestra (Livingston, New Jersey), the Atlanta Symphony, the Minnesota Sinfonia, and the San José Chamber Orchestra. She had her first European performance with the Czech Radio Symphony in 1997.

== Selected works ==
- Stevens County Fair for symphony orchestra (1983)
- The Mitten for orchestra ensemble and narrator (1986)
- Tombeau for Michael Collins for harpsichord (1987)
  Tombeau for Michael Collins by Mona Lyn Reese, performed by Barbara Day Turner.
- Choose Life, Uvacharta Bachayim dramatic oratorio (1994)
- From My Heart Springs A Song for SSA choir (1994)
- Prince for symphony orchestra (1994)
- Suite Carrol County for SATB choir and chamber orchestra (2000)
- Winter Melodies for string orchestra (2001)
- Little Pieces From My Heart for string orchestra, flute, piano and percussion (2004)
- Arise and Shine for SATB choir, organ and brass ensemble (2005)
- Toboggan for SATB choir and flute (2005)
- Land of Rest arranged for SSAA choir (2013)

== See also ==
- List of American composers
