= Choose Life, Uvacharta Bachayim =

20th-century oratorio

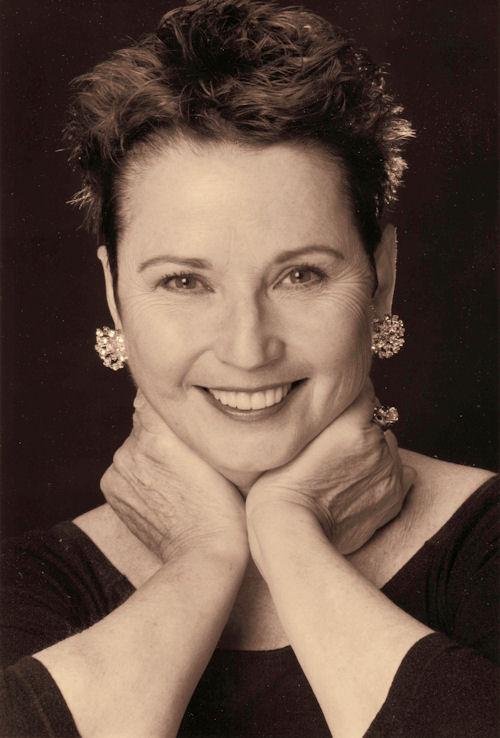
Mona Lyn Reese, composer

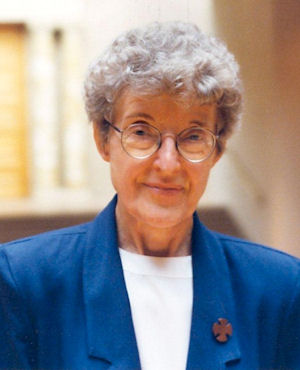
Delores Dufner OSB, librettist

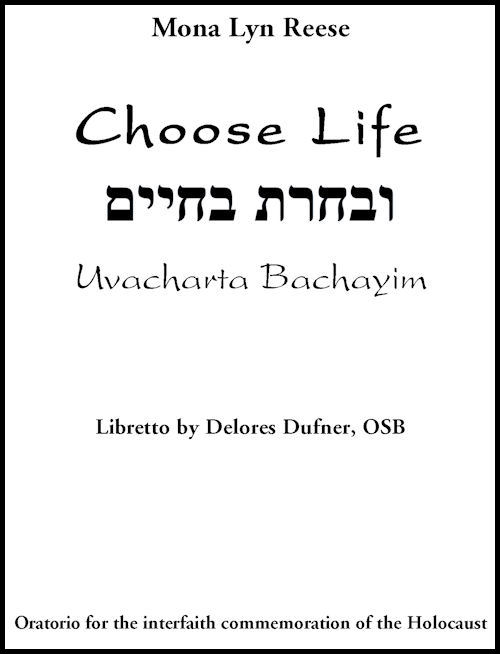
Title page from the score of Choose Life, Uvacharta Bachayim.

Choose Life, Uvacharta Bachayim, is a dramatic oratorio by composer Mona Lyn Reese and librettist Delores Dufner OSB, that draws on Jewish and Christian music and scripture, as well as the writings of Holocaust survivors, to create an interfaith commemoration of the Holocaust. It was composed during Reese's 1993-94 Faith Partners Residency sponsored by the American Composers' Forum and the Otto Bremer Foundation. Choose Life, Uvacharta Bachayim, has received national acclaim.

== Overview ==
Choose Life, Uvacharta Bachayim, is staged with costumes, scenery, and lighting; several numbers have also been choreographed for dance.

Many musical styles and sounds combine in the score. There are frequent musical references to Jewish tradition: The processional hymn and overture “O Holy One All-Wise”, uses the melody Leoni from the hymn “Yigdal”. The score includes the Jewish melody “Ani Ma'amin” in several places. The music of Adonai (God of Israel) and Lazar includes traditional Jewish modes and hymnody, recitative, and Klezmer music. Music in the Christian tradition such as Gregorian chant, polyphonic motets, Anglican Verse and Choral anthems also appear in the work.

Music and text express bitterness, anguish, and anger with God who permits tragedy, sorrow and need for comfort, the will to overcome evil, and determination to choose life over death. The six readings, found in Siddur Sim Shalom and Gates of Prayer, are taken from memoirs, diaries, and reflections on the experience of the holocaust.

Several pieces in Choose Life, Uvacharta Bachayim are based on the Jewish text and melody “Ani Ma'amin”, a prayer for the dying. The Angel Choir sings both text and melody during the first reading (#4). The Angel Choir sings the text in “How Could I Forget You” (#14). Lazar sings the “Ani Ma'amin” melody in “In Your Likeness” (#16).

The text for “Stay With Me, God”, (#13) is from Poems from the Desert, 1944; it was written by an anonymous member of the Eighth Army (United Kingdom).

The text of “How Could I Forget You”, and “Adonai” (#14 and #15) illustrates two Yom Kippur texts:

“To look away from evil: Is this not the sin of all ‘good’ people?” and “Let there be no forgetfulness before the Throne of Glory; let there be remembrance within the human heart.”

The following sung texts are direct quotations or paraphrases from the Hebrew Bible:

- Hear Me, My People (#1)

Isaiah 55:8-9 and Deuteronomy 30:11-14, 15-20

- O God of Israel (#3)

Psalm 22:2-2, 4-5

- A Voice Is Heard in Ramah (#5)

Jeremiah 31:15

- Tender God, Have Mercy (#9)

Psalm 51:1-2, 7, 10

- All Ye Who Pass By (#11)

Lamentations 1:12-13

- How Could I Forget You? (#14)

Isaiah 49:15 and Psalm 116:15

- I Shall Not Die (#20)

Psalm 118:14, 17, 116

== Dramatis Personae ==
- Adonai, mezzo-soprano – The transcendent God of Jews and Christians.
- Lazar, tenor – A Jewish survivor of the holocaust who lost most of his family and friends to the Nazis.
- Franziska, soprano – The widow of Franz Jägerstätter, an Austrian Christian peasant farmer and conscientious objector beheaded by the Nazis.
- Dives, bass – An indifferent citizen of the world, preoccupied with his own well-being, who was blind and deaf to the slaughter of the Jews.
- Adam, tenor – A repentant Everyman, who acknowledges his share of responsibility for the holocaust and begs Adonai for mercy.
- Jacob, soprano – A frightened Jewish child.
- Hebrew Chorus, SATB choir – People of faith who draw on the Hebrew scriptures to comment on world events.
- Angel Choir, Gregorian chant choir– Messengers of Adonai who pray for the dead and console the mourners.
- Repentant Nations, TTBB choir – Peoples of the world who acknowledge their share of responsibility for the holocaust and beg Adonai for mercy.
- Rivka, reader – A dramatic teller of stories from written accounts of holocaust survivors.

== Structure ==
1. Overture: O Holy One All Wise, Hear Me, My People
2. Holy One Beyond the Stars
3. O God of Israel
4. Reading 1 and Chant Ani Maamin
5. A Voice Is Heard in Ramah
6. The Death of Franz
7. Reading 2 and Chant In Paradisum
8. I Was Absent
9. Tender God, Have Mercy
10. Reading 3 and Chant Libera Me
11. All Ye Who Pass By
12. Reading 4
13. Stay With Me, God
14. How Could I Forget You?
  Holy One, You Remained With Me Through Death
  You are Precious In My Eyes
15. Reading 5
16. In Your Likeness
17. I Will Not Forget
  Adonai
18. Reading 6
19. Choose Life
20. I Shall Not Die

== Instrumentation ==
The oratorio is scored for the following orchestra and voices.

Woodwinds
Piccolo (double flute 2)
Flute
Oboe
Clarinet in A and B flat
Bassoon

Brass
2 Horns
2 Trumpets in C
Trombone (tenor)
Trombone (bass)
Tuba

Percussion
Timpani
2 Percussion
Harp
Keyboard (synthesizer or piano)

Voices
2 Soprano soloists (one adult, one child)
Mezzo-soprano solo
2 Tenor soloists
Bass solo
SATB Choir
Gregorian chant Choir (men or women)

Strings
Violins I, II
Violas
Cellos
Contra basses

== Notable performances and recordings ==
Choose Life, Uvacharta Bachayim premiered at the Basilica of Saint Mary, Minneapolis (Teri Larson, music director) in 1994. The following year, the Otto Bremer Foundation gave Reese an additional grant to write a symphonic version which was nominated for a Pulitzer Prize in 1995. The symphonic version was performed by the Billings Symphony Orchestra & Chorale (Uri Barnea, music director) in 1996, and was also performed by the Basilica of Saint Mary, Minneapolis (Teri Larson, music director), as part of the “Basilica 2000” series.

In 2011, the San José Chamber Orchestra and Chorus released Choose Life, Uvacharta Bachayim (album), recorded at Skywalker Sound in Marin County, California.

In 2014, the San José Chamber Orchestra and Chorus performed a suite from Choose Life, Uvacharta Bachayim in the San José City Hall Rotunda.
