= Choose Life, Uvacharta Bachayim (album) =

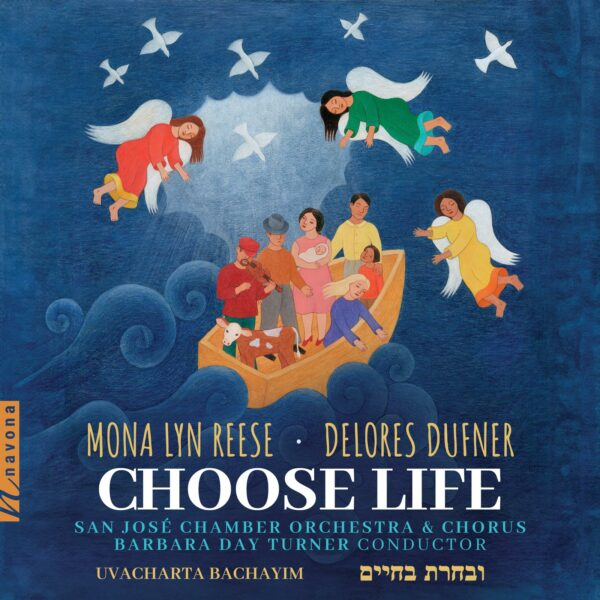

Studio album by The San José Chamber Orchestra and Chorus
- Released: April 4, 2025
- Recorded: August 18–19, 2008, and October 18, 2010, at Skywalker Sound
- Genre: Dramatic Oratorio
- Length: 49:06
- Label: Navona Records
- Producer: Barbara Christmann

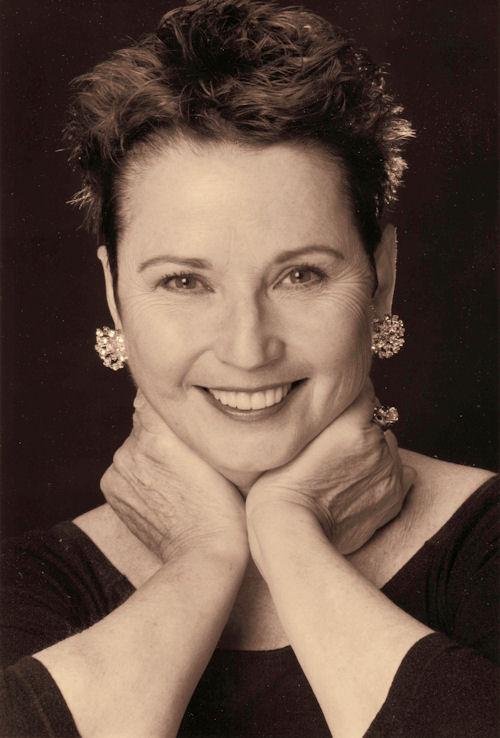
Mona Lyn Reese, composer

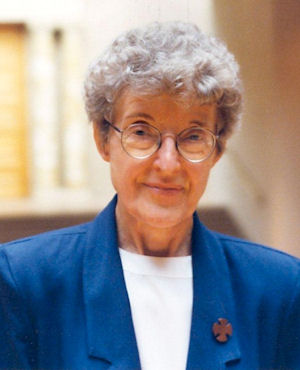
Delores Dufner OSB, librettist

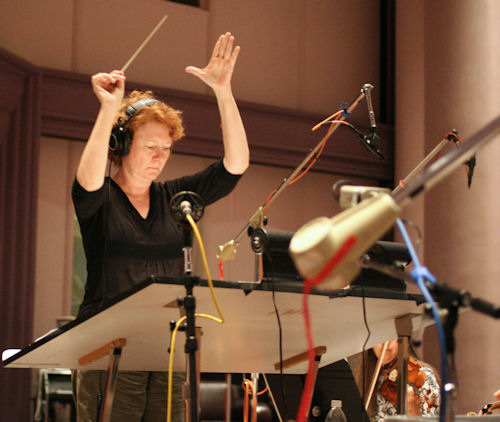
Barbara Day Turner, conductor

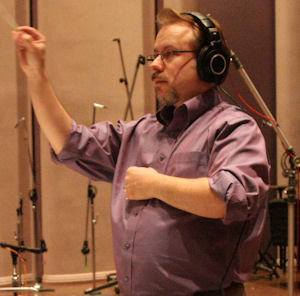
Daniel Hughes, conductor

Choose Life, Uvacharta Bachayim is a studio album of the Choose Life, Uvacharta Bachayim dramatic oratorio by composer Mona Lyn Reese and librettist Delores Dufner OSB, originally released by the San José Chamber Orchestra and Chorus in 2011.

The album was re-released by Navona Records on April 4, 2025, as release NV6696.

== Track listing ==
No.	Title	Length
1.	"Overture: O Holy One All Wise, Hear Me, My People"	6:22
2.	"Holy One Beyond the Stars"	2:11
3.	"O God of Israel"	1:50
4.	"Reading 1 and Chant Ani Maamin"	1:55
5.	"A Voice Is Heard in Ramah"	1:24
6.	"The Death of Franz"	2:10
7.	"Reading 2 and Chant In Paradisum"	1:48
8.	"I Was Absent"	2:44
9.	"Tender God, Have Mercy"	2:38
10.	"Reading 3 and Chant Libera Me"	2:16
11.	"All Ye Who Pass By"	2:02
12.	"Reading 4"	0:46
13.	"Stay With Me, God"	2:22
14.	"How Could I Forget You? Holy One, You Remained With Me Through Death; You are Precious In My Eyes"	4:51
15.	"Reading 5"	0:47
16.	"In Your Likeness"	3:07
17.	"I Will Not Forget; Adonai"	2:23
18.	"Reading 6"	1:12
19.	"Choose Life"	3:09
20.	"I Shall Not Die"	2:41
Total length:		49:06

== Cast ==
- Layna Chianakas, mezzo-soprano – Adonai
- Stephen Guggenheim, tenor – Lazar
- Allison Charney, soprano – Franziska
- Kevin Nakatani, bass – Dives
- Jordan Bluth, tenor – Adam
- Michael Riskin, soprano – Jacob
- SJCO Chorus – Hebrew Chorus
- St. Benedict’s Schola and Members of The Choral Project – Angel Choir
- The Choral Project – Repentant Nations
- Isabell Monk O’Connor – Rivka

== Production ==
- Ken Lee – Mastering Engineer
- Myron Dove – Mix Engineer, Editor
- Barbara Day Turner – Executive Producer
- Mona Lyn Reese – Executive Producer
- Barbara Christmann – Producer
- Thomas Hassing – Photography
- Gabriela Martínez, Texto – Art Direction
- Marie Olofsdotter – Cover illustration Choose Life
- Recorded by Leslie Ann Jones on The Scoring Stage at Skywalker Sound, assisted by Dann Thompson and Robert Gatley.
- Schola recorded by Rockhouse Productions, St. Joseph, MN.

== Artistic ==
- Mona Lyn Reese – Composer
- Delores Dufner OSB – Librettist
- Barbara Day Turner – Conductor
- Daniel Hughes – Conductor
- Teri Larson – Chorus Master
- Daniel Hughes – Chorus Master
- Keiko Kagawa-Hamilton – Choral Preparation
- Christine Manderfeld, OSB – Schola Conductor
- The San José Chamber Orchestra – Orchestra
- Choristers from The Choral Project, Choral Cosmo, and Prince of Peace Lutheran Church – Choir
- Michael Touchi – Accompanist
