= Filippos Selkos =

Greek footballer

Personal information
- Date of birth: 11 August 1999 (age 27)
- Place of birth: Castrop-Rauxel, Germany
- Height: 1.86 m (6 ft 1 in)
- Position: Forward

Team information
- Current team: BSV Schüren

Youth career
- –2017: Hombrucher SV
- 2017–2018: SC Paderborn

Senior career*
Years	Team	Apps	(Gls)
2018–2019	SC Paderborn II	10	(4)
2019–2021	Panionios	0	(0)
2021–2023	ASC 09 Dortmund	17	(3)
2023	Lüner SV	0	(0)
2023–	BSV Schüren	0	(0)
- * Club domestic league appearances and goals as of 24 February 2019

Filippos Selkos (Greek: Φίλιππος Σέλκος; born 11 August 1999) is a Greek professional footballer who plays as a forward for BSV Schüren.
