= The Choral Project =

American choir

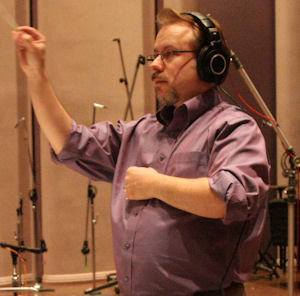
Daniel Hughes, conductor

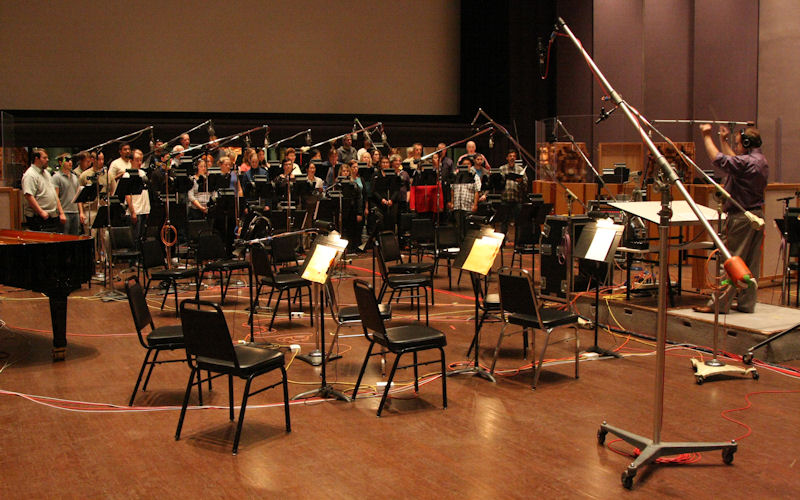
Conductor Daniel Hughes and The Choral Project recording at Skywalker Sound

The Choral Project is a mixed-voice choir founded in 1996 by artistic director and conductor Daniel D. Hughes and based in San Jose, California. The group's vision is "to heal our world through music and words," while their mission is "to connect to one another through choral theater, education and musical excellence."

The Choral Project's repertoire is broad and diverse, ranging from Bach, Debussy, and Brahms to modern composers like Kirke Mechem, Rene Clausen, Michael Ostrzyga, Stephen Jackson and Eric Whitacre. They have performed in Washington, D.C.'s National Cathedral, San Francisco's Mission Dolores Basilica, Mission Santa Clara de Asís, Santa Cruz' Holy Cross Church, and multiple venues in England, Scotland, Wales, Costa Rica, and Mexico. During their 2001 tour, The Choral Project appeared live on Mexican National Radio. In 2004, the ensemble competed in the Mixed Choir division of the Llangollen International Eisteddfod in Wales, coming away with a second-place finish. In 2007, while competing against six choirs from around the world at the California International Choral Festival & Competition in San Luis Obispo, California, the group placed in all three categories - 1st place in the Choir's Choice category, 2nd place in the Required Music category and 3rd in the Folk Music category.

Every season, The Choral Project uses one concert to focus on an important social issue. For example, in February 2017 the choir performed Street Requiem with mezzo soprano Frederica von Stade to highlight the issue of homelessness. The Santa Cruz Sentinel wrote, "The piece, said the 53-voice Choral Project’s artistic director Daniel Hughes, addresses issues of what it’s like to live on the streets and assumes the voice of the homeless in confronting the audience, 'Why do you ignore me when you leave the concert hall?'"

To date, The Choral Project has released eight albums: The Cycle of Life, Of Christmastide, Americana, Water & Light (the group’s #1 best seller on the Clarion label), Winter, One is the All, Tell the World, and most recently Yuletide, a festive collection of holiday favorites.

The Choral Project also performs on the San José Chamber Orchestra recording of the dramatic oratorio Choose Life, Uvacharta Bachayim, by composer Mona Lyn Reese and librettist Delores Dufner, OSB.

The Choral Project is also a 501(c)(3) non-profit organization involved in community outreach, including a choral mentorship program for local high school students, joint performances with visiting choirs and an annual Choral Composition Contest for high school students and undergraduates.
