= Otto Bremer =

German American banker and philanthropist

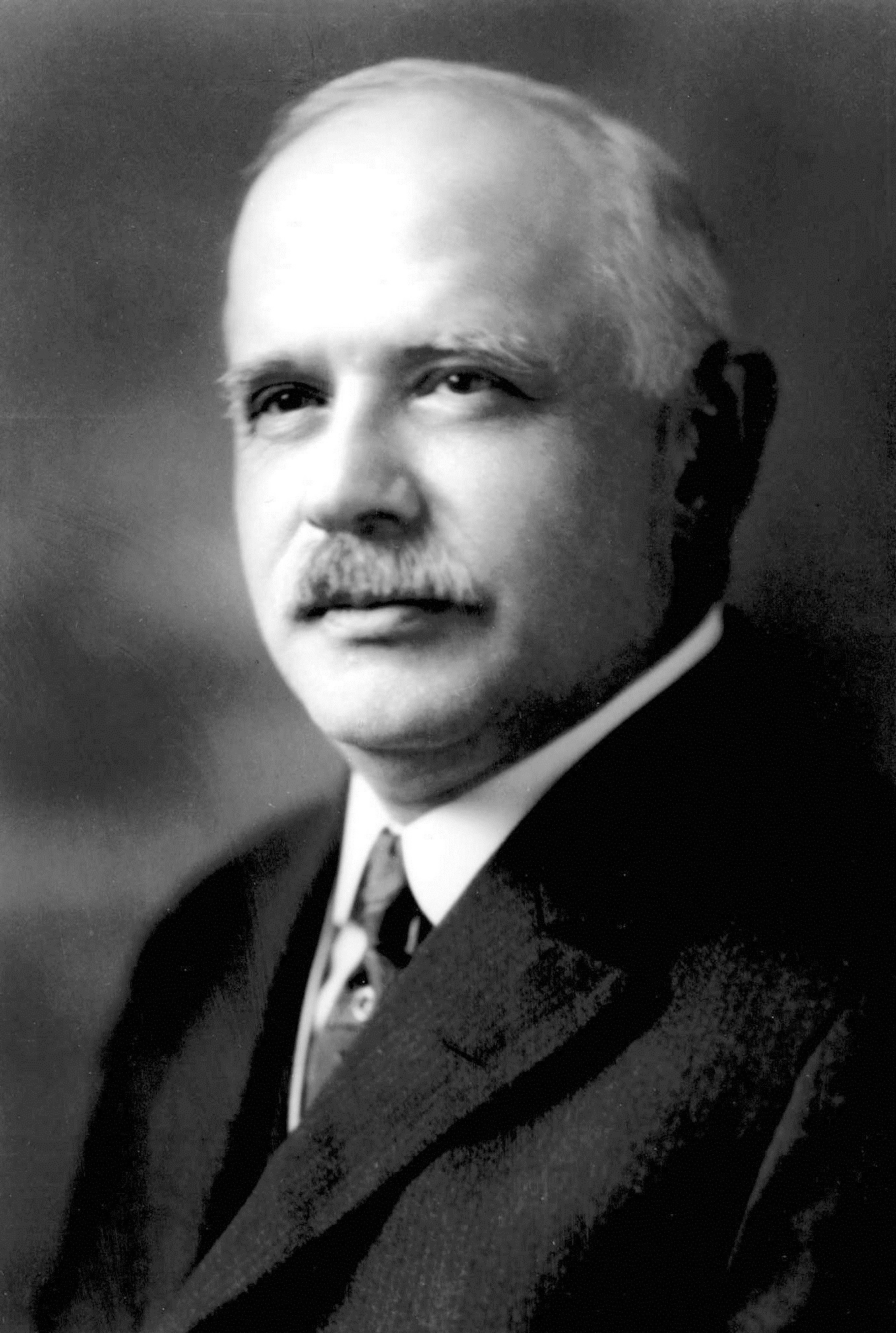
- Born: October 22, 1867; Seesen, Germany
- Died: February 18, 1951 (aged 83)
- Occupations: Banker, philanthropist
- Known for: Founding Bremer Bank and the Otto Bremer Foundation

Otto Bremer (October 22, 1867 – February 18, 1951) was a German American banker and philanthropist. He founded Bremer Bank and the Otto Bremer Foundation, which grants funds for use in the communities where the banks operate.

== Immigration, banking and beer ==
Bremer was born on October 22, 1867, in Seesen, Germany, son of a banker father. He immigrated to the United States, arriving in November 1886 with his brother Adolf. He worked as a stock clerk for a St. Paul, Minnesota, wholesale hardware company before he took a position as a bookkeeper at the National German American Bank in 1887. During the next decades, he was promoted to higher positions, and became a major stockholder in the bank. In 1921, he became Chairman of the new American National Bank, and continued as chair for 20 years.

Adolf and Otto Bremer owned 25 percent of Schmidt's Brewery stock by 1901.

Following the death of Jacob Schmidt in 1911, Schmidt's son-in-law and Bremer's brother Adolf assumed control of the Schmidt brewery. Both Bremer brothers were active in politics, having lobbied against the Minnesota County Option Law in the 1890s, a law that would have allowed counties to institute alcohol prohibition. Following Adolf's death in 1939, Otto served as President of Schmidt's Brewery.

During the Great Depression, from 1929 through the 1930s, Bremer invested money in many small-town banks in the area, often showing up with a satchel of cash to save the local bank from failing. By the mid -1930s, he held stock in 55 banks in the area. He had also risked the full capital value of the bank, and had to be rescued by his brother Adolf, who pledged the shares in Schmidt Brewing Company held by him and his wife (Marie Schmidt Bremer, the daughter of brewery founder Jacob Schmidt). With his brother Adolph, Bremer ran the Jacob Schmidt Brewing Company.

In 1943, Otto created the Otto Bremer Company as a holding corporation to consolidate his interests in these banks (by this time, he was the major or sole owner of most of them). He also created the Otto Bremer Foundation in 1944, as a charitable organization to grant funds for public purposes in the small towns where there was a Bremer bank. The Foundation was funded from the profits of the Bremer bank holding company. As of 2009, the Foundation donates about $25 million each year. In addition, bank employees are strongly encouraged to volunteer in local town activities. Each year, these employees donate more than 100,000 volunteer hours.

Bremer served as treasurer of the city of St. Paul for over 10 years and was advisor to presidents Woodrow Wilson and Franklin D. Roosevelt. He was subsequently appointed by Roosevelt to manage the Federal Home Owner's Loan Corporation of Minnesota.

=== Kidnapping of Edward Bremer ===
In 1934, Edward Bremer, a banker and nephew of Otto, was kidnapped by the Karpis-Barker gang in broad daylight, as he was dropping off his daughter at the Summit School in St. Paul. This kidnapping, together with that of brewing heir William Hamm, Jr., brought an end to the O'Connor agreement, whereby St. Paul Police Chief John O'Connor allowed such gangsters to use St. Paul as a safe haven, provided they committed no crimes within the city. The Bremer family paid a ransom of $200,000; audaciously doubling the ransom of $100,000 paid by the Hamm family. Both victims were released unharmed, after about a week.

== Legacy ==
When Otto Bremer died in 1951, he left most of his fortune and his stock in the Otto Bremer Bank Company to the Otto Bremer Trust. The Trust remains the major owner of the Bremer Bank Company, holding about 92% of the stock. The remaining stock is owned by employees or retired employees of the company.

== Bremer Bank ==
Bremer Bank is the name of the banks owned by the Bremer Financial Corporation, a bank holding company founded by Otto Bremer in 1943. They operate bank branches in Minnesota, Wisconsin, and North Dakota, with a financial capitalization of about $1 billion and total assets of $12.3 billion. With headquarters in St. Paul, Minnesota, the company is completely owned by employees and the Otto Bremer Trust.
