= Castrop-Rauxel =

- Town
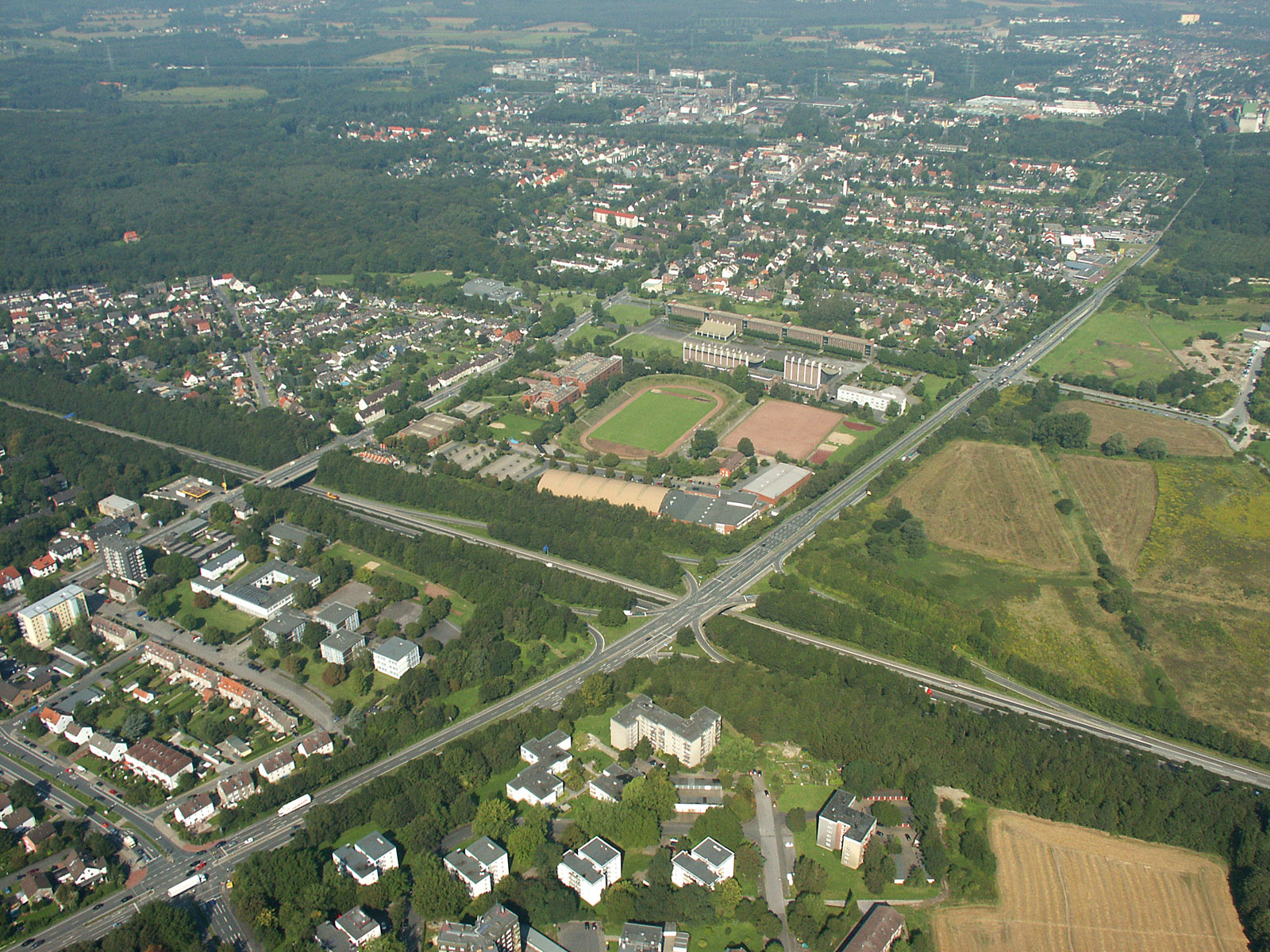

- Coat of arms

- Location of Castrop-Rauxel within Recklinghausen district
- Interactive map of Castrop-Rauxel
- Location within Germany Location within North Rhine-Westphalia
- Coordinates: 51°33′N 7°19′E
- Country: Germany
- State: North Rhine-Westphalia
- Admin. region: Münster
- District: Recklinghausen
- Subdivisions: 15

Government
  - Mayor (2020–25): Rajko Kravanja (SPD)

Area
  - Total: 51.68 km^{2} (19.95 sq mi)
- Elevation: 98 m (322 ft)

Population (2025-12-31)
  - Total: 72,353
  - Density: 1,400/km^{2} (3,626/sq mi)
- Time zone: UTC+01:00 (CET)
  - Summer (DST): UTC+02:00 (CEST)
- Postal codes: 44575–44581
- Dialling codes: 02305, 02367 (Henrichenburg)
- Vehicle registration: RE, CAS, GLA
- Website: www.castrop-rauxel.de

Castrop-Rauxel (German pronunciation: [ˌkastʁɔpˈʁaʊksl̩]), often simply referred to as Castrop by locals, is a former coal mining city in the eastern part of the Ruhr Area within the state of North Rhine-Westphalia in Germany.

== Geography ==
Castrop-Rauxel is located in Germany between Dortmund to the southeast, Bochum to the southwest, Herne to the west, Recklinghausen to the northwest, Datteln to the north and Waltrop to the northeast.

=== Urban area ===
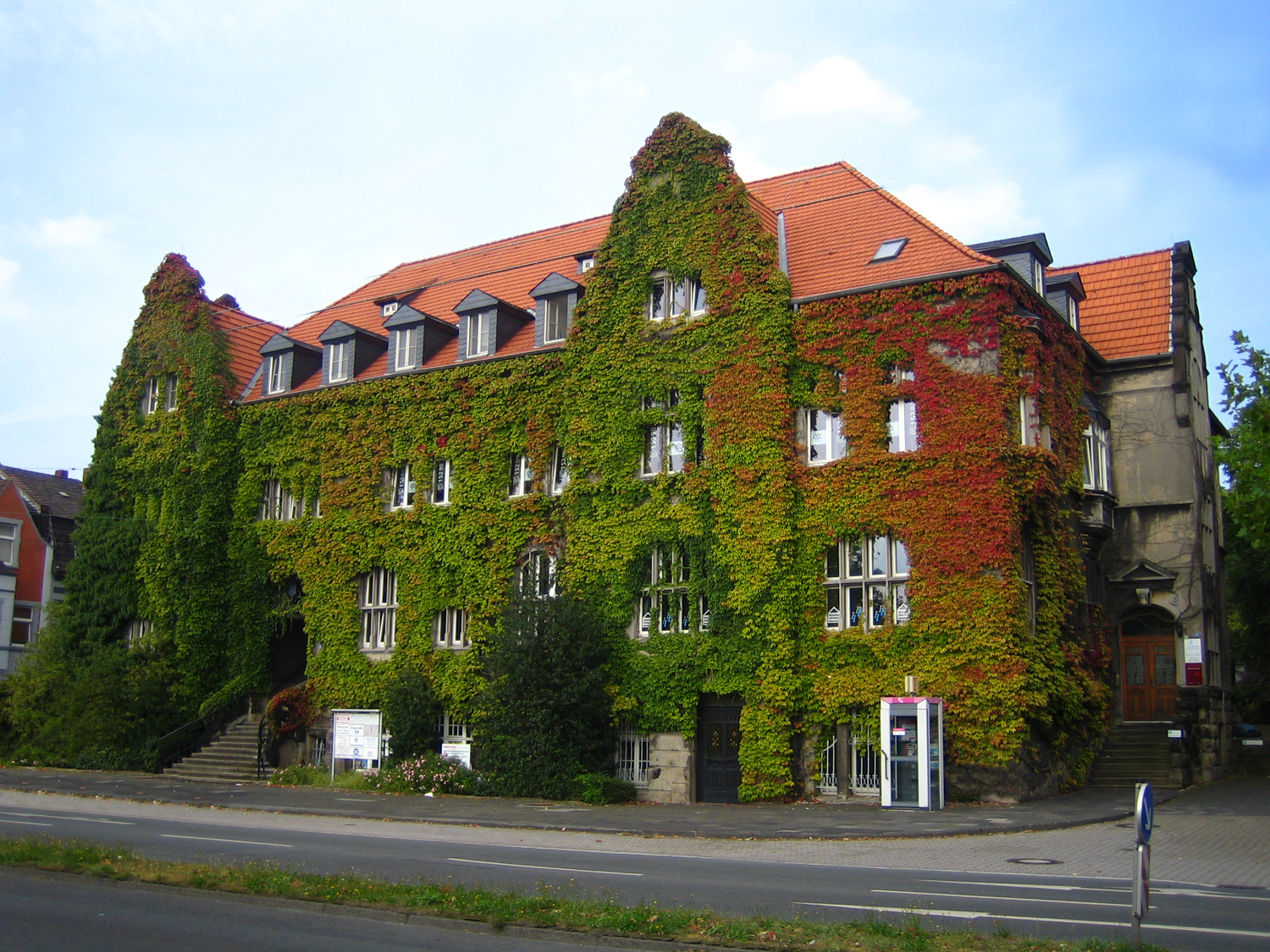
Old town hall

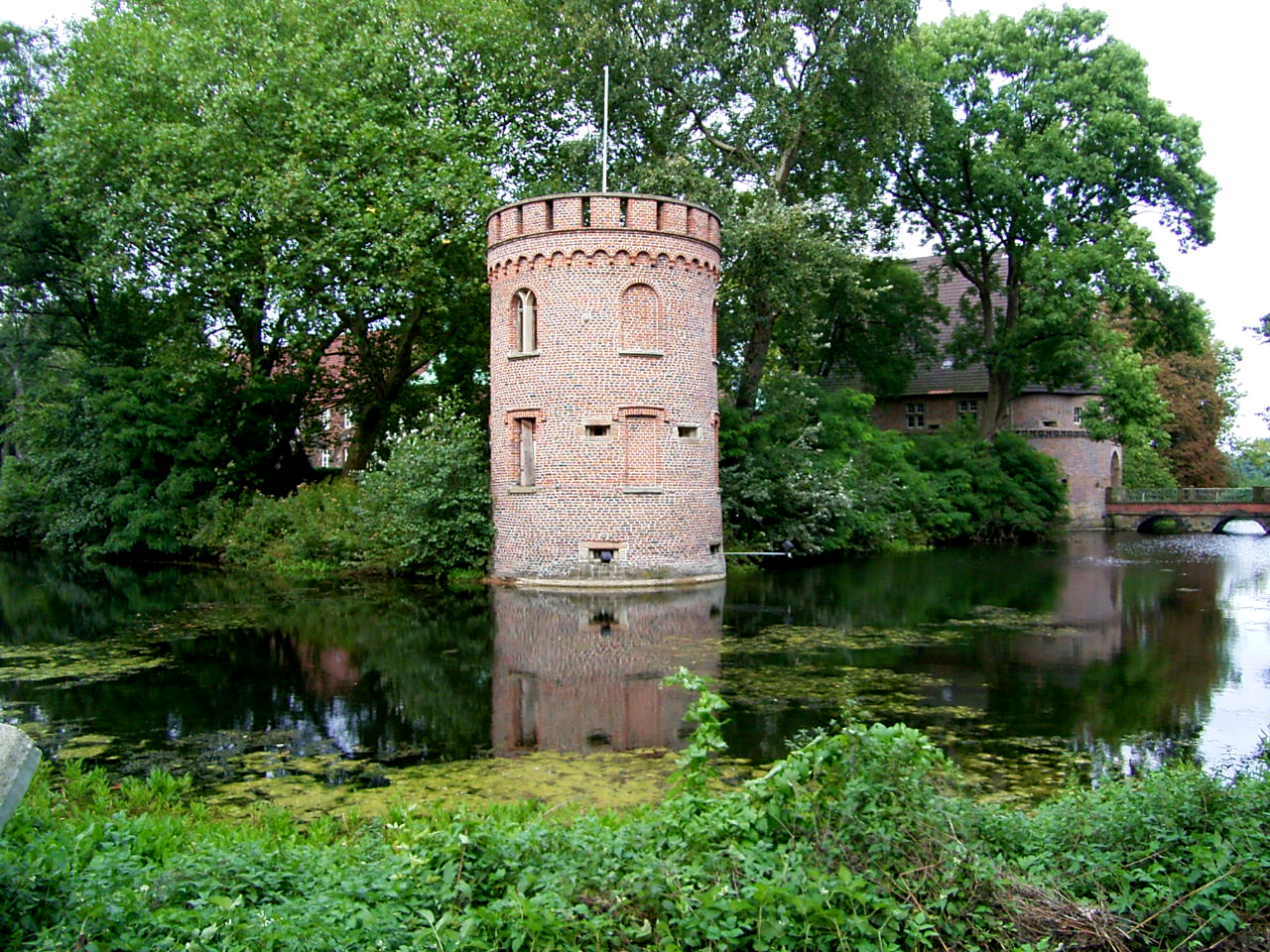
Bladenhorst Castle

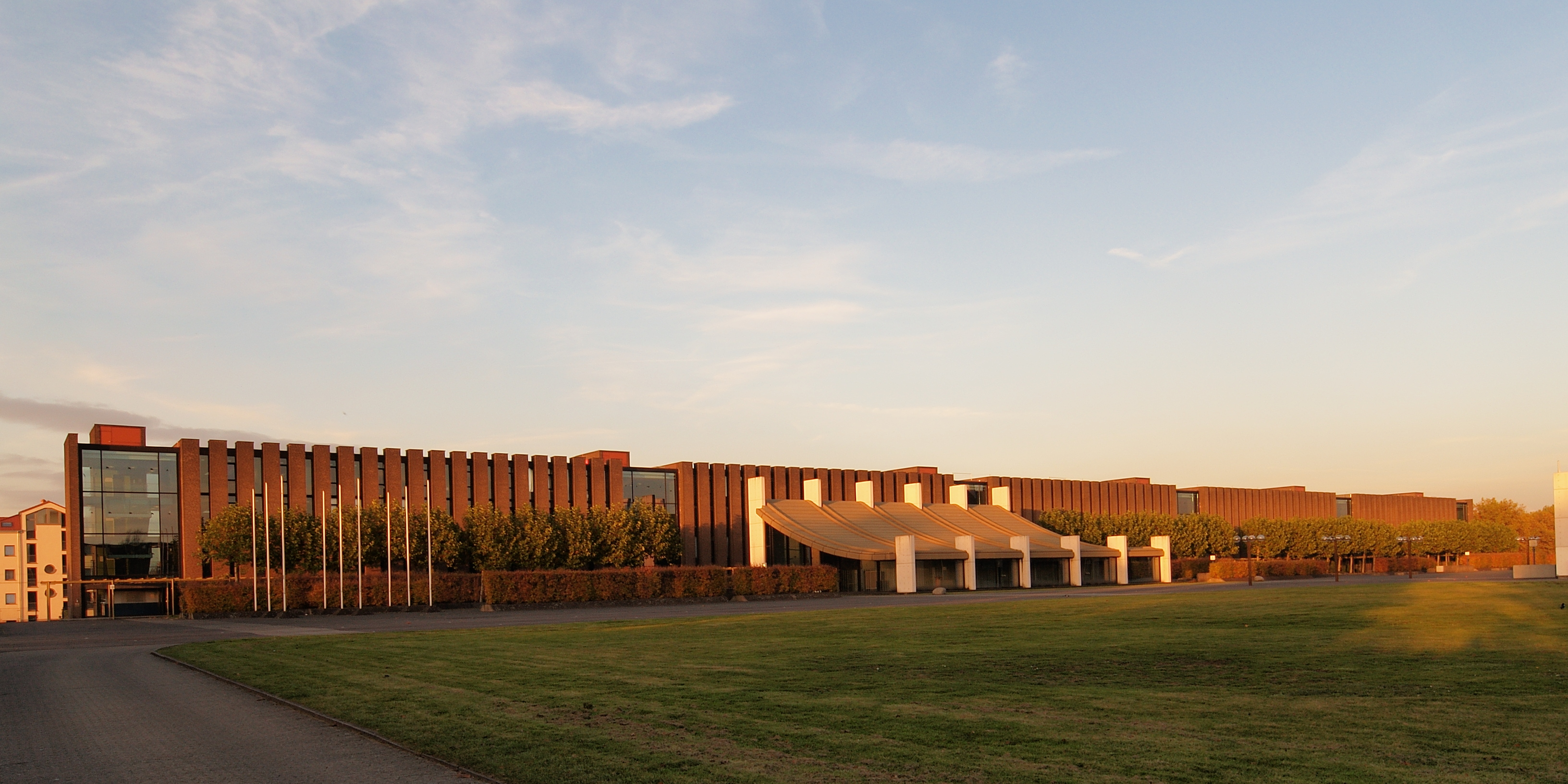
Castrop-Rauxel town hall

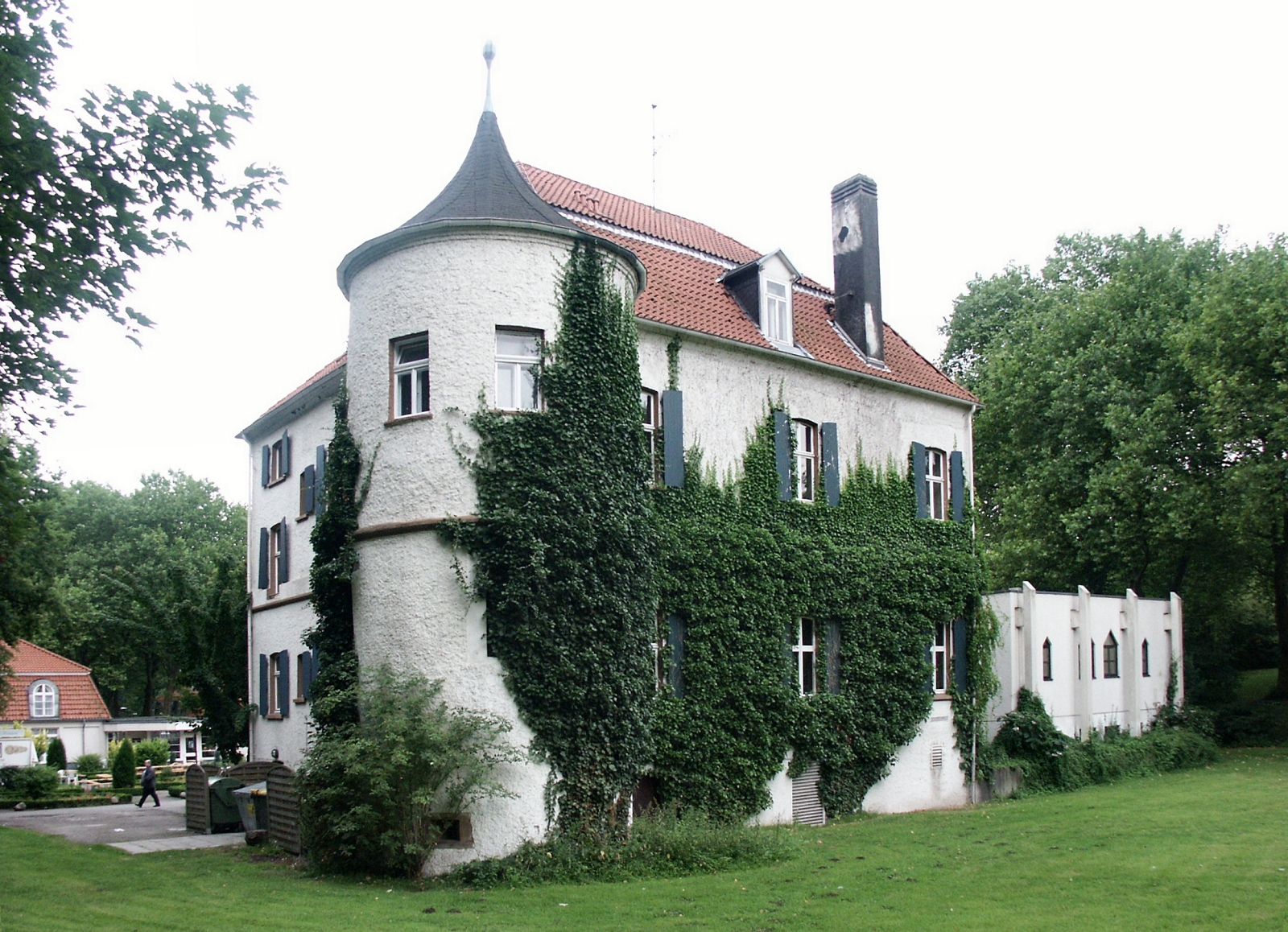
Haus Goldschmieding

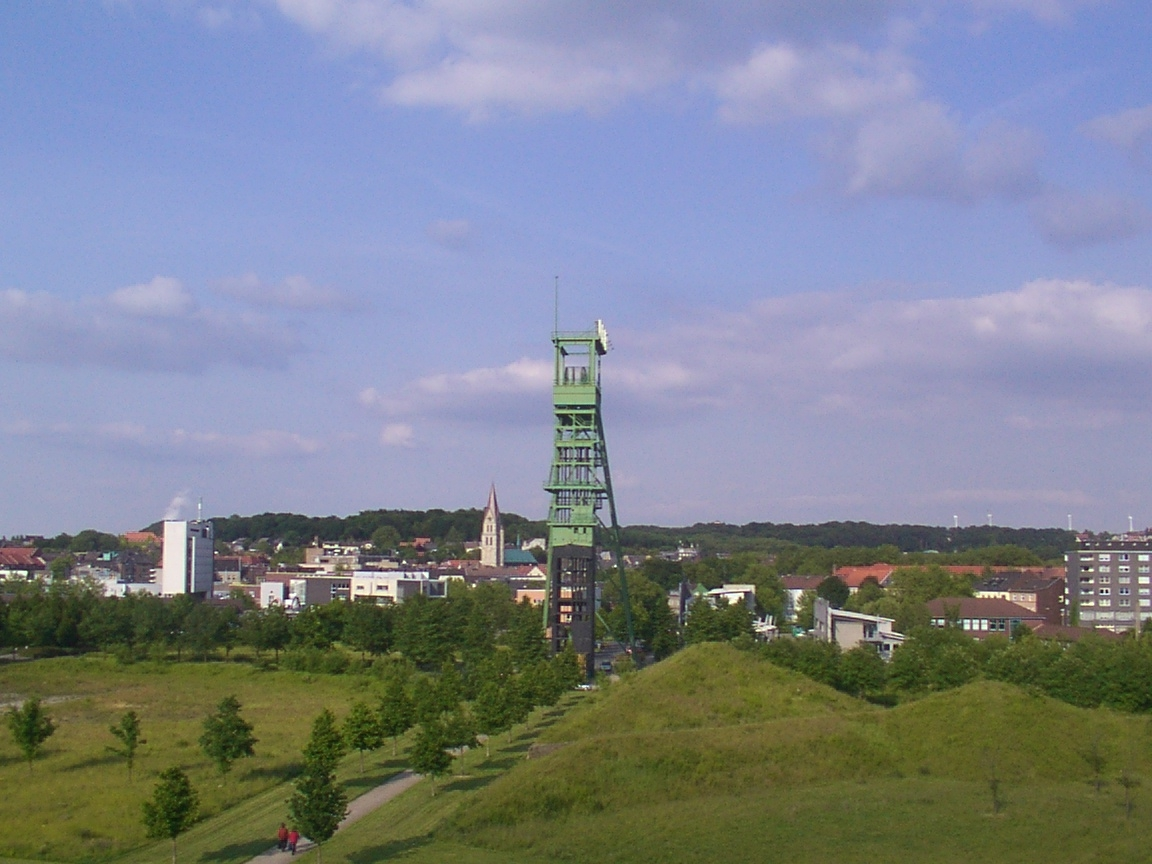
Former coal mine Zeche Erin

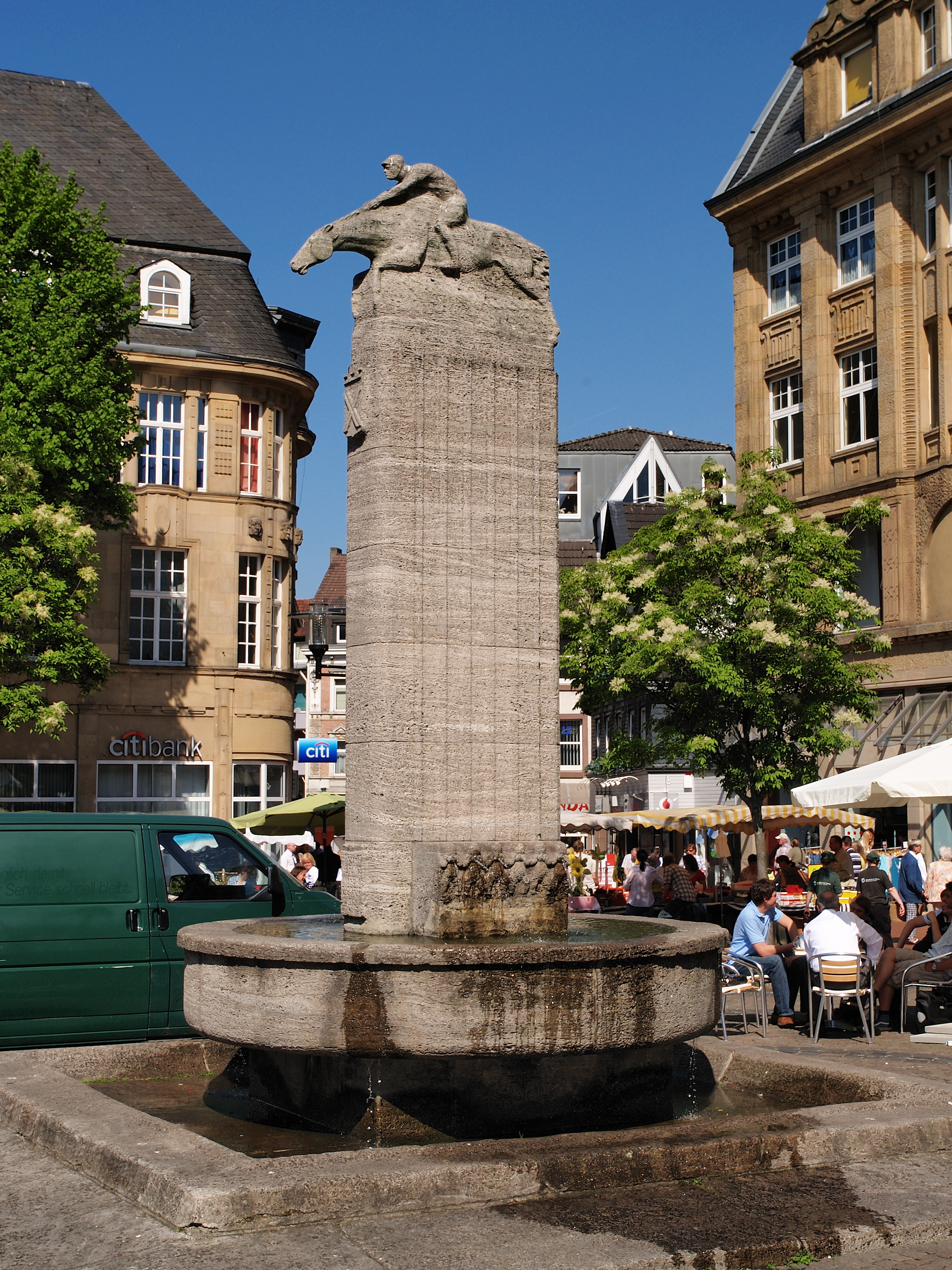
Memorial at Altstadtmarkt

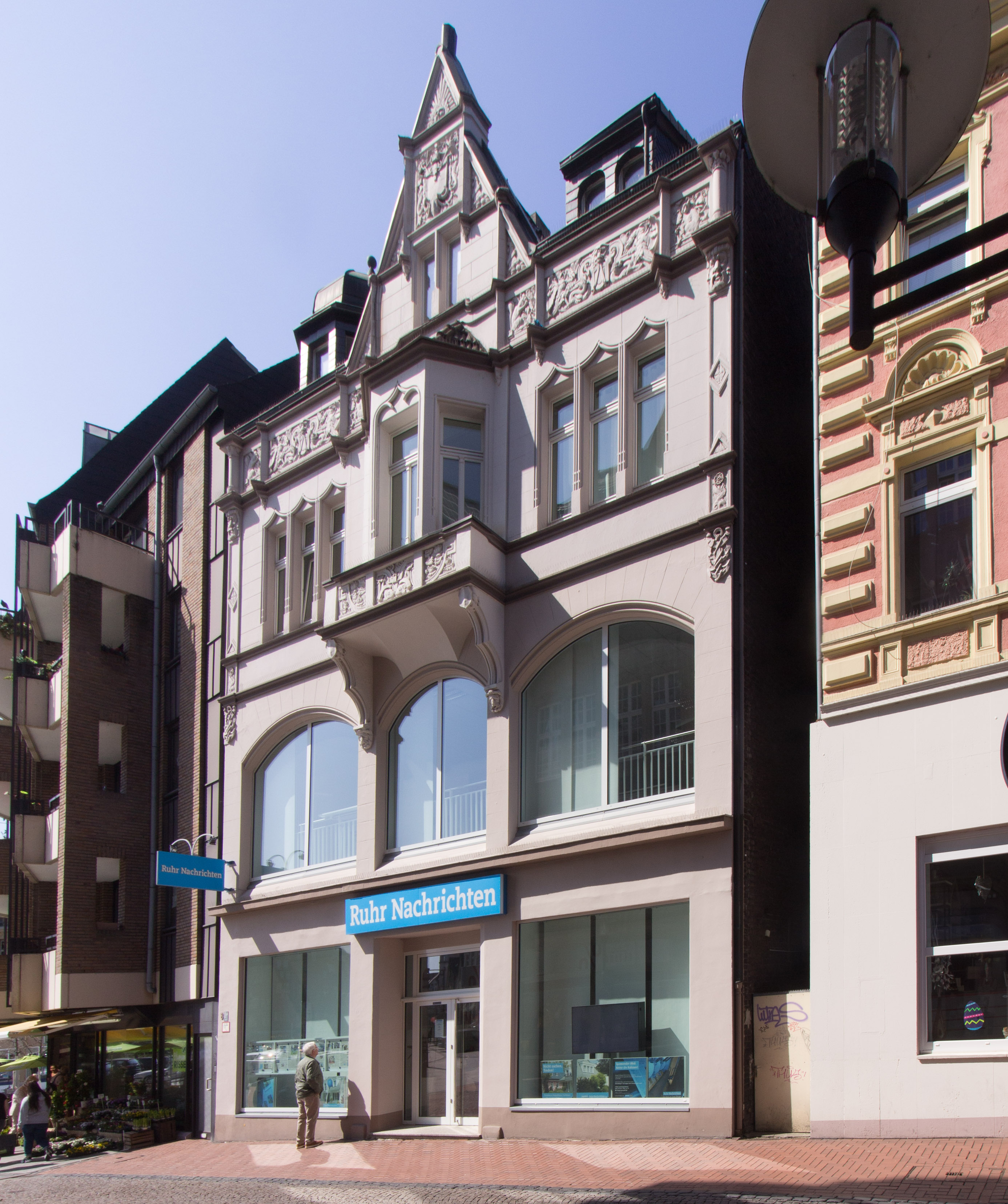
Market Place (Altstadtmarkt)

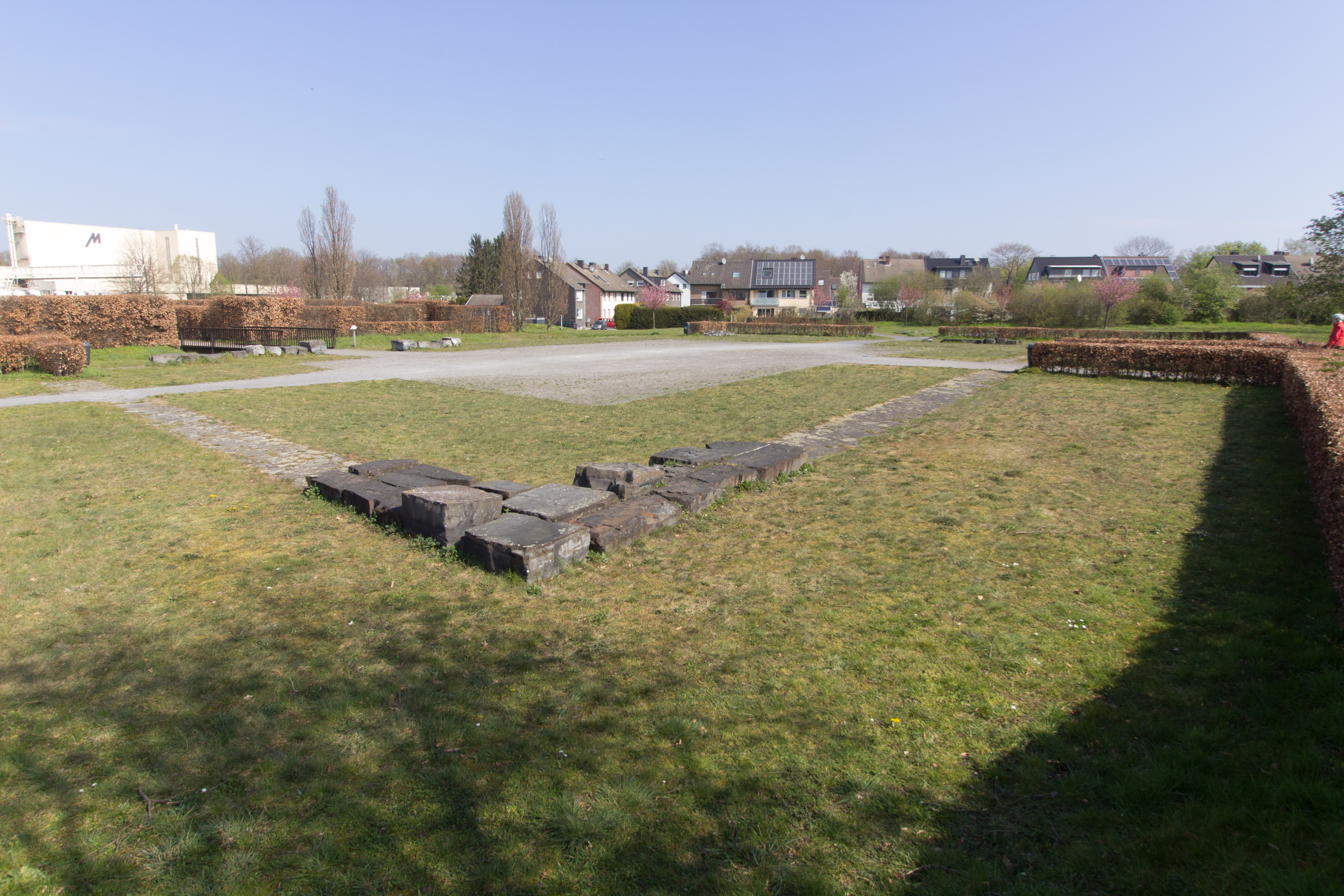
Park Henrichenburg

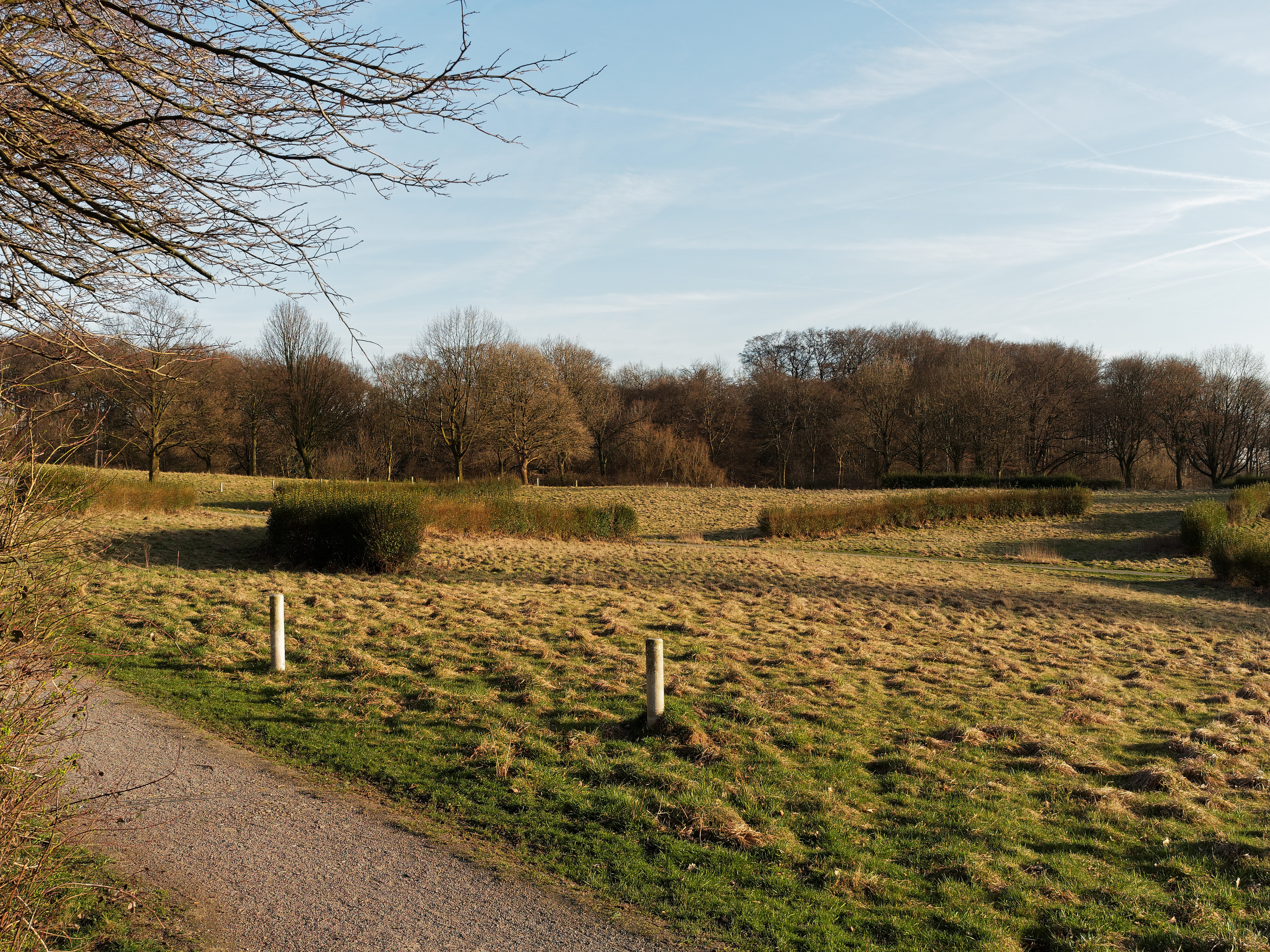
Former race course

The city covers an area of 51.67 km^{2} (19.95 sq mi). The Halde Schwerin (slag heap in the Schwerin district) is marked as the point of highest elevation at 147 m (482.3 ft) above sea level. The lowest point is located on Pöppinghauser Straße (Poppinghausen Street), besides house number 264, with an elevation of 50.2 m (164.7 ft) above sea level.

The city is divided into 15 districts, from north to south and within one line from west (southwest) to east (northeast):

- Henrichenburg (Becklem)
- Pöppinghausen, Habinghorst, Ickern
- Bladenhorst, Rauxel, Deininghausen
- Behringhausen, Castrop, Dingen
- Obercastrop, Schwerin
- Bövinghausen, Merklinde, Frohlinde

The total area of the city divided into different uses (31 December 2010):

Surface	in m^{2}	in %
Buildings and open spaces	16,384,832	31.7%
Operating area	1,497,843	2.9%
Recreation area	2,835,924	5.5%
Traffic area	6,191,789	12.0%
Agricultural land	14,116,843	27.3%
Forest land	7,938,248	15.4%
Water surface	1,941,522	3.8%
Other uses	758,372	1.5%
Total area	51,665,373	100%

Population figures for the individual districts (Stand: 2005):

Districts	Population
Henrichenburg	5,333
Ickern	16,650
Habinghorst, Pöppinghausen	9,970
Deininghausen, Dingen, Rauxel	10,056
Bladenhorst, Rauxel-Nord	6,065
Schwerin	6,672
Behringhausen, Castrop, Obercastrop	16,743
Frohlinde	3,509
Merklinde	2,621

== History ==
Castrop-Rauxel was first mentioned in 834 as "Villa Castorpe",. The name could be derived from the Germanic words trop meaning "village" and kast meaning "barn" or "depot". Rauxel is the name of the northern part of the city. Rauxel was a village which was integrated into the city in 1926. It was first mentioned as "Rouksele" in 1266. This name might be derived from the Germanic words rouk meaning "crow" and sel meaning "meadow".

In 1847 the railway line from Cologne to Minden was opened and a railway station was built in the north of the village Castrop. The railway proved to be very useful for the economical development of the village. The first coal mine (Zeche Erin) was inaugurated by William Thomas Mulvany, an Irish industrialist living in Germany, close to the village in 1869. Another six coal mines were founded around Castrop soon afterwards. Between 1874 and 1878 another railway line was built between Duisburg and Dortmund with two train stations in the south of Castrop which developed into a mining town at the end of the 19th century.

Castrop merged with two other municipalities (Obercastrop and Behringhausen) and attained municipal status in 1902 with 13, 917 inhabitants. On April 1, 1926 Castrop-Rauxel was formed when Castrop merged with 10 other municipalities the biggest of which was Rauxel with 19,800 inhabitants. The number of inhabitants of Castrop-Rauxel amounted to 53,399 in 1926.

During World War II, a plant at Castrop-Rauxel used the Bergius process to produce synthetic (German: Ersatz) oil products. During World War II Castrop-Rauxel suffered 35 air raids and 24% of the city was destroyed by bombs. In 1961 Castrop-Rauxel had 87,910 inhabitants, its maximum in history. In 1975, the village of Henrichenburg was annexed and Castrop-Rauxel became part of the Recklinghausen (district). In 1984 the last of 7 coal mines at Castrop-Rauxel ("Erin") closed. As a consequence, the number of inhabitants declined.

== Population ==
Historical population

Year	Pop.	±% p.a.
1965	90,667	—
1970	88,403	−0.50%
1975	82,378	−1.40%
1980	78,885	−0.86%
1985	76,436	−0.63%
1990	79,037	+0.67%
1995	79,160	+0.03%

Year	Pop.	±% p.a.
2000	78,608	−0.14%
2005	77,619	−0.25%
2010	75,408	−0.58%
2015	74,220	−0.32%
2020	73,126	−0.30%
2025	72,353	−0.21%

Source: Landesdatabank Nordrhein-Westfalen

== Sights ==
Bladenhorst Castle (Wasserschloss Bladenhorst) was built in the 16th century. Saint Lambert Church, the oldest church in Castrop-Rauxel, stems from the 12th century. Another Saint Lambert Church built around 1450 in a late gothic style can be visited in Henrichenburg which became a part of Castrop-Rauxel in 1975. Goldschmieding Castle (Haus Goldschmieding) which was built in the 16th century was transformed into a hotel with a restaurant. The Town Hall was built from 1971 to 1975. The area of the former coal mine Zeche Erin was transformed into a park.

Around the Market Place Altstadtmarkt several houses built in the typical style of Gründerzeit can be seen. During this period Castrop-Rauxel was a flourishing mining town. Mulvany, the industrialist who founded the first coal mine, had a race course laid out in Castrop in 1874. In 1912, a memorial was erected with a memorial fountain (Reiterbrunnen) referring to the horse races which were held until 1970.

== Parks ==
Stadtgarten Park was laid out in the south of the centre in 1931. In the north of Castrop-Rauxel, Landschaftsarchäologischer Park Henrichenburg is worth a visit. It was laid out around the foundations of a castle which had been first mentioned in 1263 and dismantled in 1787. The foundations were rediscovered by chance during construction works in 1994. Ceramics, tiles and weapons were unearthened before the foundations were covered with earth again. Hedges were planted on the foundations to give an impression of the dimensions of the castle.

== Politics ==
The current mayor of Castrop-Rauxel is Rajko Kravanja of the Social Democratic Party (SPD) since 2015. The most recent mayoral election was held on 13 September 2020, with a runoff held on 27 September, and the results were as follows:

Candidate	Party	First round		Second round	
Candidate	Party	Votes	%	Votes	%
Rajko Kravanja	Social Democratic Party	13,101	49.3	11,640	66.7
Oliver Lind	Christian Democratic Union	6,674	25.1	5,823	33.3
Manfred Fiedler	The Greens/FWI/The Left	4,422	16.6		
Mario Rommel	Independent	1,213	4.6		
Nils Bettinger	Free Democratic Party	1,160	4.4		
Valid votes		26,570	98.7	17,463	98.8
Invalid votes		359	1.3	210	1.2
Total		26,929	100.0	17,673	100.0
Electorate/voter turnout		60,039	44.9	60,007	29.5
Source: City of Castrop-Rauxel (1st round, 2nd round)

=== List of mayors ===
Lord Mayors

- 1926–1933: Mende, Centre Party (Germany) (Mayor, from 1928 Lord Mayor)
- 1933–1945: Richard Anton, NSDAP
- 1945–1946: Arnold Boerboom
- 1946–1948: Hubert Krehe, CDU
- 1948–1971: Wilhelm Kauermann, SPD
- 1971–1975: Hugo Paulikat, SPD

Mayors

- 1975–1989: Hugo Paulikat, SPD
- 1989–1999: Hans Ettrich, SPD
- 1999–2004: Nils Kruse, CDU
- 2004–2015: Johannes Beisenherz, SPD
- 2015–2025: Rajko Kravanja, SPD

=== City council ===
Results of the 2020 city council election.

The Castrop-Rauxel city council governs the city alongside the Mayor. The most recent city council election was held on 13 September 2020, and the results were as follows:

Party	Votes	%	+/-	Seats	+/-
Social Democratic Party (SPD)	10,256	38.9	▼1.3	20	±0
Christian Democratic Union (CDU)	7,059	26.8	▼3.9	14	▼1
Alliance 90/The Greens (Grüne)	3,988	15.1	▲7.1	8	▲4
Independent Citizens' Party (UBP)	1,146	4.3	▲0.3	2	±0
Free Voter Initiative (FWI)	1,132	4.3	▼3.2	2	▼2
The Left (Die Linke)	1,021	3.9	▼1.4	2	▼1
Free Democratic Party (FDP)	1,014	3.8	▼0.5	2	±0
Die PARTEI	775	2.9	New	2	New
Valid votes	26,391	98.2			
Invalid votes	486	1.8			
Total	26,877	100.0		52	▲2
Electorate/voter turnout	60,039	44.8	▲2.5		
Source: City of Castrop-Rauxel

== Transport ==
Castrop-Rauxel has access to three major highways, the Emscherschnellweg A 42, the Sauerlandlinie A 45 and the A 2.
There are 3 railway stations within the city. The central station (Castrop-Rauxel Hauptbahnhof) on the Cologne-Minden Railway is located in the suburb of Rauxel. Connecting Castrop-Rauxel to the western Ruhr cities like Duisburg, Oberhausen, Essen, Gelsenkirchen, Herne and in the east to Dortmund and Hamm. The unmanned stations of Castrop-Rauxel South (Castrop-Rauxel Süd) and Castrop-Rauxel Merklinde on the Duisburg-Ruhrort–Dortmund railway have hourly services with trains to Dortmund, Herne and Dorsten. Located in the city centre is the central bus station Muensterplatz. From here passengers can travel to almost all suburbs and to neighboring cities like Herne, Dortmund and Bochum.
The Rhine-Herne Canal runs right through Castrop-Rauxel; Castrop-Rauxel also has a small Yacht club on this body of water.

== Twin towns – sister cities ==
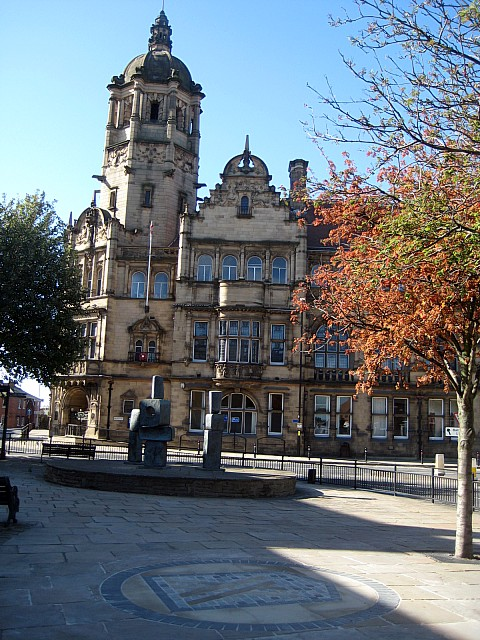
Castrop Rauxel Square, Wakefield, named after its twin town

Castrop-Rauxel is twinned with:

- Wakefield, England, United Kingdom (1949)
- Vincennes, France (1961)
- Kuopio, Finland (1965)
- Zehdenick, Germany (1990)
- Nowa Ruda, Poland (1991)
- Trikala, Greece (2013)
- Zonguldak, Turkey (2013)

== Economy ==
Castrop-Rauxel has been attempting to change from a former mining city to a city with a modern lifestyle, high recreational value, new economy companies, a 27-hole golf course, and various cultural events. Despite those efforts, the town has one of the lowest median incomes per capita in North Rhine-Westphalia.

Metalworking and electronics are the key manufacturing sectors.

== Culture ==
The WLT (Westphalian State Theater) is the oldest and most relevant source of theatrical entertainment in Castrop-Rauxel. There is one cinema with two screens in Castrop. Castrop’s history is closely connected to horse racing, the Reiterbrunnen in the very center of Castrop’s market square is a reminder of the race days on the Naturhindernisbahn, now part of the Goldschmieding Park.

== Notable people ==
- Hedwig Kiesekamp (1844–1919), singer and writer
- Heinrich Haslinde (1878–1938), local poet
- Josef Hermann Dufhues (1908–1971), politician CDU) Member of Landtag North Rhine-Westphalia, NRW Interior Minister and President of the Parliament
- Wilhelm Specht (1910–1986) entrepreneur, businessman and association official
- Heinz Ballensiefen (1912–?), historian and Nazi functionary who used to investigate the "Jewish question"
- Hermann Paschasius Rettler (1915–2004), bishop of Bacabal (Brazil)
- Alfred Niepieklo (1927–2014), German Football Champion in 1956 and 1957
- Josef Reding (born 1929), writer
- Erwin Weiss (1934–2008), singer
- Friedhelm Wentzke (born 1935), canoeist
- Dietrich Berke (1938–2010), musicologist and publishing editor
- Paul Reding (born 1939), painter, sculptor and writer
- Werner Trzmiel (born 1942), athlete
- Friedhelm Ost (born 1942), journalist and politician
- Klaus Fichtel (born 1944), footballer
- Gabriele Sikora (born 1950), politician (SPD), 1995–2010 Member of the Landtag of North Rhine-Westphalia
- Lawrence Schlieker (born 1951), abbot of Benedictine Gerleve
- Udo Helmbrecht (born 1955), former President of the BSI (Federal Office for Information Security) and Managing Director ENISA (European Network and Information Security Agency)
- Mathias Schipper (born 1957), footballer
- Hans-Peter Villis (born 1958), manager
- Inge Blask (born 1959), politician (SPD), since 2012 Member of Parliament
- Wolfram Wuttke (1961–2015), football player
- Dieter Hecking (born 1964), football coach
- Bernd "Bernie" Blume (born 1964), tech entrepreneur
- Michael Ostrzyga (born 1975), composer and conductor
- Marcel Sieberg (born 1982), cyclist
- Christian Mamerow (born 1985), racing driver
- Barış Özbek (born 1986), footballer
- Marc-André Kruska (born 1987), footballer
- Semih Güler (born 1994), footballer
- Rana Tokmak (born 1996) rhythmic gymnast
- Electric Callboy, electronicore band formed in 2010. 5 out of 6 members reside in Castrop
- Chris Führich (born 1998), footballer
- Gökhan Gül (born 1998), footballer
