= Michael Ostrzyga =

Michael Ostrzyga is a German composer and conductor based in Cologne. He is known for his choral music in particular, being commissioned by festivals like the Schleswig-Holstein Musik Festival and performers like The Chamber Choir of Asia, the Finnish YL Male Voice Choir (Ylioppilaskunnan Laulajat), the Vienna Chamber Choir, Latvian Youth Choir "Kamēr..." and Chamber Choir Consono, among others. His works are performed by ensembles like the Raschèr Saxophone Quartet, New Dublin Voices, the Australian Chamber Choir, Rheinisches Klavierduo, Swedish choirs Kammarkören Pro Musica and Allmänna Sången Neues Rheinisches Kammerorchester, The Choral Project (California) and SFA A Cappella Choir (Texas).

The premier of his a cappella work IUPPITER was awarded the Carl-Orff Prize during the International Chamber Choir Competition Marktoberdorf in 2007. In 2009, IUPPITER was also repertoire at the Swedish choral conducting competition ERIC ERICSON AWARD. His internationally acclaimed collection of piano miniatures, “Der singende Wind”, published by Breitkopf & Härtel in 2010, received the award “Best Edition 2011.”

Besides, he is the music director at University of Cologne, where he currently leads the Collegium Musicum, an organization housing the university’s major musical ensembles. Serving as conductor of the Symphony Orchestra, Choir, and Chamber Choir, he has appeared in concerts in the Cologne area, as well as abroad (in Prague, Boston, New York City for example) and in several national and international festivals.

As a guest conductor, he collaborated with ensembles like Neue Philharmonie Westfalen, Kölner Vokalsolisten and appears in festivals like AchtBrücken. As a formerly active pianist, he co-founded the chamber music ensemble Sforzato presenting extraordinary concerts combining music of all eras and regions. Throughout all of these various positions, he has also regularly commissioned and premiered numerous new works by composers such as Jan Masanetz, Friedrich Jaecker, Martin Gees and Martin Herchenröder.

Ostrzyga was born in Castrop-Rauxel, North Rhine-Westphalia in Germany, where he was initially trained in piano, organ, and choral activities by Bruno Zaremba before studying conducting with renowned conductor Marcus Creed, composition with Friedrich Jaecker, and piano with Peter Degenhardt.

== List of compositions (not complete) ==
- Im-Puls-ar Toccata for piano (2008/2009)
- Harmonia for Chorus a cappella (commissioned by Schleswig Holstein Musik Festival 2009)
- Chant for Chorus a cappella, 2009 (commissioned by LandesJugendChores Rheinland-Pfalz)
- Sieben letzte (und erste) Worte, 2009 (commissioned by Cologne Vocal Soloists)
- Trinity - Tripelvariationen (Image) for Organ, 2009/2010 (commissioned by Ev. Kirchenberband Koeln und Region)
- On Leaving for Vocal-Soloists, Violin and Doublebass
- e n d l i c h for Percussion
- Virgen de las Nieves for Chorus a cappella, 2010 (commissioned by International New Music Festival Streams)
- Mercurius for Chorus a cappella, 2010 (commissioned by Chamber Choir Consono)
- Sieben letzte (und erste) Worte, 2011 - version for Vocal-Quartet, Early Music Instruments and Tamtam (commissioned by Cologne Vocal Soloists)
- Drift for Chorus a cappella, 2011/2012 (commissioned by Neuer Chor Berlin to celebrate their 25. anniversary)
- Resounds for Vocal-Quartet, Chorus und Early-Music-Instruments, 2012 (commissioned by via-nova-chors München)
- Pied Beauty for chorus a cappella 2011/2012 (commissioned by The Chamber Choir of Asia)
- fern for Sopran Solo and piano 2012
- Kaladu for chorus a cappella 2013 (commissioned by "Kamēr...")
- Stabat mater for chorus a cappella 2014 (commissioned by Vienna Chamber Choir)
- Saturn for chorus a cappella 2013/2014 commissioned by via-nova-chor Munich for the opening concert of Deutscher Chorwettbewerb in Weimar
- Laudate eum omnes stellae luminis for women's chorus and Saxophon-Quartet (commissioned by Freiburger Dommusik, premiered by Mädchenchor am Freiburger Münster and Raschèr Saxophone Quartet conducted by Martina van Lengerich on Oktober 19th 2014 as part of "Musical Innovations" in the Freiburger Münster)
- Aerobatics for Saxophonquartett (commissioned by Freiburger Dommusik, premiered by Raschèr Saxophone Quartet on Oktober 19th 2014 as part of "Musical Innovations" in the Freiburger Münster)
- Deus in adjutorium, Dixit Dominus, Lauda Jerusalem, 2014 (commissioned by Bayerischer Landesjugendchores, premiered on November 16, 2014 in Grosser Konzertsaal der Hochschule für Musik und Theater München with the Bayerischen Landesjugendchor and conductor Gerd Guglhör)
- Fraktal I - Elf Permutationen for Soli, Oberton-Soli und Chor, composed for University of Cologne Chamber Choir and the Cologne Vokal Soloists, premiered on January 21, 2015 in the concert series GegenSätze in the Cologne Trinitatiskirche. Conductor was Walter L. Mik, part of the singers was Overtonesinger Lothar Berger.

== General references ==
- Universität zu Köln
