= Ani Ma'amin =

Jewish prayer

Ani Ma'amin (Hebrew: אֲנִי מַאֲמִין, lit. 'I believe') is a prosaic rendition of Maimonides's thirteen-point version of the Jewish principles of faith. It is based on his Mishnah commentary to tractate Sanhedrin. The popular version of Ani Ma'amin is of a later date and has some significant differences with Maimonides's original version. It is of unknown authorship. Both Ani Ma'amin and a poetic version, Yigdal, form part of the prayers of Jews and have inspired varied settings to music.

== Form ==
The recitation consists of thirteen lines, each beginning with the phrase "Ani ma'am be-emunah shelema" ("I believe with full faith"). It follows the same order as Maimonides's enumeration.

== In prayer ==
Many religious Jews recite Ani Ma'amin at the conclusion of Shacharit, the Jewish morning prayer service. The poetic version, Yigdal, is more commonly recited at the beginning of the prayers. In some communities, Yigdal is also recited on Shabbat and after the evening service (Arvit) on Jewish holidays.

== Culture ==
The penultimate line refers to the essential Jewish belief in the coming of the Mashiach. As such, this line has become a popular source of lyrics for Jewish songs.

One version of the lyrics, set to a "haunting melody", is attributed to Azriel David Fastag, a Modzitzer Hasid whose compositions were regularly sung in the court of the Modzitzer Rebbe, Rabbi Shaul Yedidya Elazar. He reportedly composed the tune in a cattle car while being taken to Treblinka. Fastag announced that he would give half of his share of the World to Come to whoever would bring the tune to the Modzitzer Rebbe, who had escaped Europe in 1940. Two men took him up on his offer and leaped from the moving train. One died from the fall, but the other survived and eventually brought the tune to the Rebbe's son in Israel, who sent his father the musical score. However, this attribution has been questioned, as there is evidence that rather than being deported to Treblinka, Fastag fled Warsaw for Vilna and found sanctuary in Shanghai. Nevertheless, the melody's wartime origins and connection to Warsaw are undisputed.

The tune was sung by dozens of Jews as they marched to the gas chambers in the Nazi death camps. This tune is still frequently sung at Holocaust Remembrance Day services. Some also sing it at the Passover Seder, in memory of the Warsaw Ghetto Uprising, which began on the first night of Passover in 1943.

Another tune to the words of Ani Ma'amin is used as a positive song included at happy events, mainly weddings. The words are the same, but a much happier tune is used. The popular Chabad-Lubavitch singer Avraham Fried has recorded a version of this song that has gained popularity, reflecting the Chabad-Lubavitch's emphasis on the imminent coming of the Messiah.

Ani Ma'amin was sung by the choir during Pope John Paul II's historic visit to the Synagogue of Rome on April 13, 1986.

Other popular versions of Ani Ma'amin were composed by Shlomo Carlebach and Moshe Goldman.
