= Otto Bremer Trust =

American private charitable trust

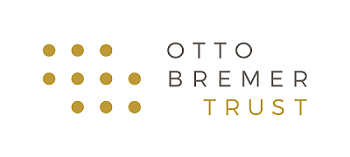
- Formation: 1944
- Type: Charitable trust
- Headquarters: Saint Paul, MN, United States
- Key people: Charlotte S. Johnson; Daniel C. Reardon
- Revenue: $69,637,257 (2020)
- Expenses: $87,084,604 (2020)
- Website: www.ottobremer.org

The Otto Bremer Trust is a private charitable trust located in St. Paul, Minnesota. It was founded by Otto Bremer in 1944 and owns 92 percent of Bremer Bank which was sold for $1.4 billion to Old National Bank in 2024. The bank's sale will be finalized in 2025. In 2016, the Trust made a record $47 million in grants and program-related investments.

The trust makes grants and program-related investments in Minnesota, North Dakota, and western Wisconsin in communities where there are Bremer banks. The organization changed its name from Otto Bremer Foundation in 2015.

== History ==
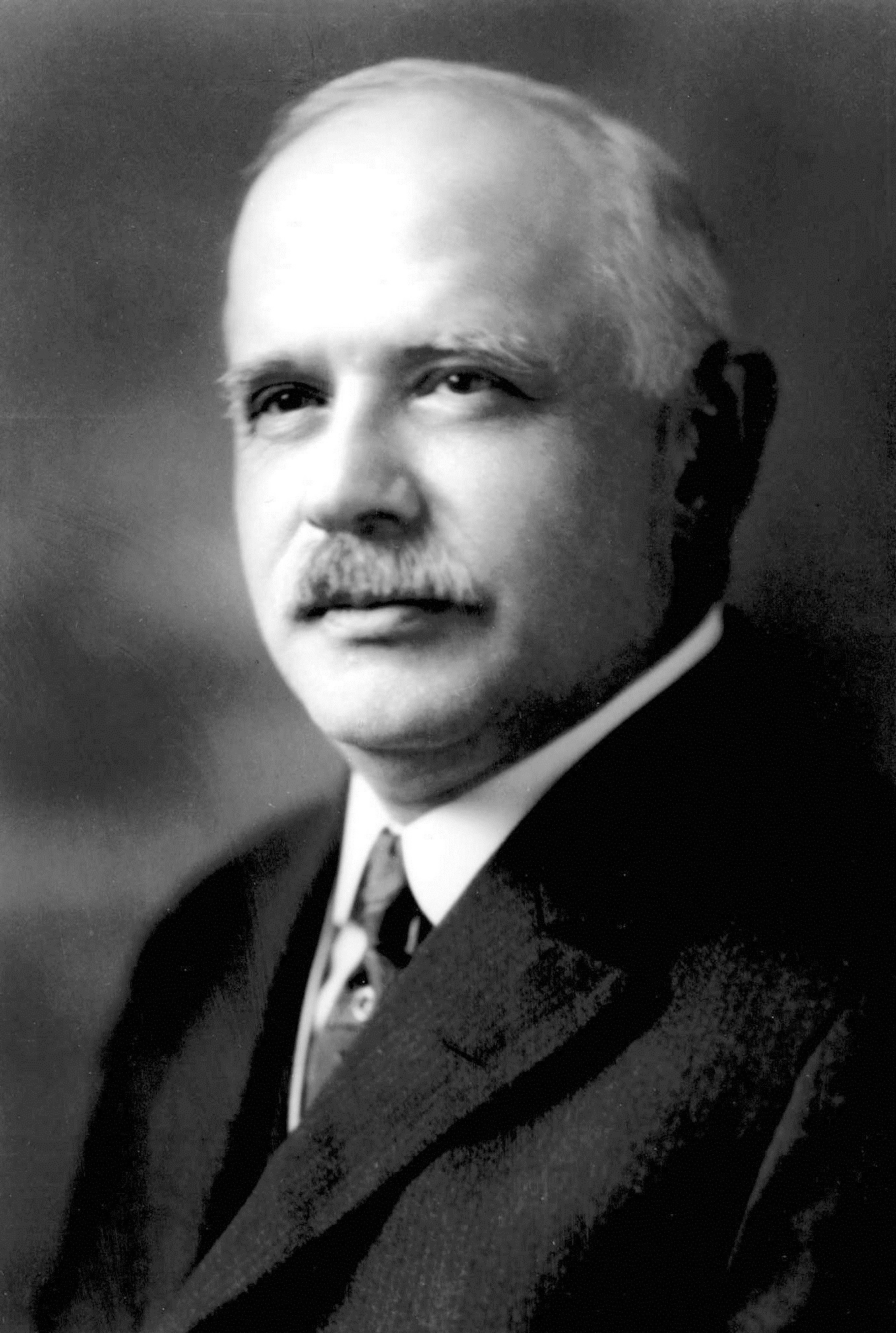
Portrait of Otto Bremer

Otto Bremer was a German-American immigrant who came to the United States in 1886. He worked in several jobs before becoming a bookkeeper at the German American National Bank, where over the next 36 years he rose to become chairman of the American National Bank. He was an investor in independent rural banks throughout the Upper Midwest and during the Great Depression used his own assets to help support many of these banks.

He partnered with his brother Adolph in the ownership and management of the Jacob Schmidt Brewing Company, St. Paul, Minnesota. He served as treasurer of the City of St. Paul for more than a decade and became an advisor to Presidents Woodrow Wilson and Franklin D. Roosevelt.

Bremer established the Trust to perpetuate Bremer banks and help support the communities in which they are located.

== Mission ==
The Trust invests in people, places and opportunities in the Upper Midwest.

== Grantmaking ==
The Trust accepts grant applications from organizations located in communities where there are Bremer banks. Priority is given to opportunities with the potential to move a community forward in meaningful and broad-based ways. This broadness of vision is intentional in order to encourage innovative responses to community opportunities and challenges.

Since its founding, the Trust has made over $700 million in grants and program-related investments to organizations in the Upper Midwest.

== Governance ==
The Trust is managed by two full-time co-CEOs and trustees. In addition to oversight of the Trust's grant making and program-related investments. The Trustee position is not merit-based; rather, it is passed down from parents to children, with no job interview or search for qualified candidates. This is an issue which was mentioned by Paul Olson in an Op-Ed apropos the pushing out of its Executive Director in 2014.

Not unlike other private charities created by their founders, trustees are often individuals who are either family members or close business confidants. Trustees have the authority to name a successor.

According to the Trust's 990-PF for 2017 (its tax return), the trustees have grown the Trust's resources since 2014, increasing annual distributions from $42,296,824 in 2014 to $50,212,684 in 2018, while keeping expenses at 11.24 percent, well below the level of its peers.

== Organizational Realignment ==
In 2014, the Trust embarked on a realignment that more effectively structured the organization for the future. As part of the changes, the Trust realigned its philanthropic leadership into seven regions spanning Minnesota, North Dakota and western Wisconsin, with a dedicated staff member serving as each region's point of contact.

== Strategic Options for Bremer Financial Corporation ==
On Oct. 28, 2019, the Otto Bremer Trust announced that it had “commenced a process to explore strategic options for BFC,” which could lead to a sale or merger of Bremer Financial Corp. (BFC), parent of Bremer Bank. OBT is the 86 percent owner of BFC.

According to a press release issued by OBT, “the organization believe[s] it is necessary to fulfill our legal obligations and is in the best interests of the individuals and communities that OBT serves. A successful transaction would enable an incredibly significant increase in OBT’s philanthropy and allow us to expand our work in Minnesota, North Dakota, Wisconsin, and Montana.”

Financial analysts estimated that BFC could be worth in excess of $2.2 billion. At that value, OBT's 5 percent annual payout as required by the IRS would double from $50 million per year to $100 million per year.

== Litigation in 2019-2023 ==
On Nov. 19, 2019, Bremer Financial Corporation (BFC) filed a lawsuit in response to the Trust's Oct. 28, 2019, announcement to explore strategic options, accusing the three trustees of the Otto Bremer Trust of acting in a "disloyal scheme."

The 165-page complaint contends that, among other things, the disloyal scheme included actions such as hiring an investment banker to solicit offers for the bank and sharing confidential information without approval.

The Trust said that it was disappointed that the bank has "chosen a path of obstruction and conflict in this matter. In doing so, they are acting in a manner that seems certain to hurt the bank and its employees, to waste the resources of the company and to hurt the people Otto Bremer dedicated his life and fortune to helping. The allegations in the lawsuit are false and without merit.”

The trustees filed their answer and counterclaim in the lawsuit on December 9, 2019.

The issue was effectively resolved in 2022 (and affirmed in 2023) when a judge ruled that a now-former trustee of the trust, Brian Lipschultz, could not get back onto the board after it was found that he was using the trust's employees "to staff his own side business" as well as to perform his own personal business, as the St. Paul Pioneer Press reported; an Appeals Court affirmed in January 2023 that Lipschultz would not be allowed back on the board. The other two trustees of the board at the time, Daniel Reardon and Charlotte Johnson, were allowed to remain on the board despite Minnesota's attorney general seeking to have them removed after Reardon and Lipschultz had attempted to sell Bremer Bank to hedge funds.

== Criticism ==
In July 2014, the executive director of the trust was abruptly "pushed out in a restructuring of the organization." The three trustees subsequently became co-CEOs, creating a title that allowed for their uncharacteristically large salaries; according to the National Committee for Responsive Philanthropy, "In 2013 alone, the trustees received more than $1.2 million from the foundation, compared to the $24,000 median trustee compensation among the country's largest foundations." Furthermore, the trustees' total salaries grew rapidly over the course of a decade, increasing from $124,500 in 2004 to over $1.2 million in 2013 alone, a 1000 percent increase.

This led Aaron Dorfman, the executive director of the National Committee for Responsive Philanthropy to "detail his organization's findings in a letter to Tamera Ripperda, IRS director for exempt organizations . . . A further examination of IRS tax records by NCRP showed this ousting was only the latest in a series of troubling decisions, inducing the watchdog group to call for an investigation by the Minnesota Attorney General." Dorfman also speculated about the increase in legal fees apparent from the Foundation's tax forms, writing "Given the millions involved, another question begs to be answered: Are the trustees diverting other foundation assets for personal enrichment?". According to the National Committee for Responsive Philanthropy, "In 2013 alone, the trustees received more than $1.2 million from the foundation, compared to the $24,000 median trustee compensation among the country's largest foundations." Furthermore, the trustees' total salaries grew rapidly over the course of a decade, increasing from $124,500 in 2004 to over $1.2 million in 2013 alone, a 1000 percent increase.

Another response came from Paul Olson, who wrote an Op-Ed in the Star Tribune, in which he observed that "At Bremer, the criticisms include excessive trustee compensation of more than half a million dollars annually (after a 1,000-percent increase over 9 years); concentrating the roles of CEO, chairman and treasurer with the trustees; and firing the foundation’s executive director to justify the increased salaries." Olson continued his Op-Ed by drawing parallels between the Blandin Foundation's 1977 scandal: "Frankly, it’s out of the same playbook of self-interest dressed up as charity. The lawyers who wrote the playbook in each case were from the same law firm." Olson further notes the similarity between the trustee's salaries and those of the presidents of Minnesota's higher education systems, allowing him to sharply contrast the qualifications and workload required for the respective positions: "But the academic leaders got their appointments on the basis of a national search, not from their fathers. They have Ph.Ds and are nationally ranked scholars. They manage budgets in the billions, employ thousands, and report to public boards as well as to the governor and the Legislature." Olson concludes his Op-Ed with the imperative that "... Bremer trustees should tear up the pre-1969 tax-dodging, self-perpetuating private-bank, nepotism-driven trust arrangement and get on with philanthropy in the best Minnesota tradition." and stating that "The judge and the AG should demand that Bremer reform, and the Minnesota Council on Foundations should provide guidance. Voluntary compliance is better than coercion."

Trustees have served as the co-chief executives of the Trust since 1944. Critics have alleged that the trustees face no oversight in setting their compensation plans. Those plans are developed by professional compensation consultants and reflect the guidelines set by the Trust's founder, Otto Bremer. The plans are presented for approval to the Ramsey County District Court and were approved most recently in a court order dated December 26, 2017.

== Assets ==
As of December 31, 2018, the Otto Bremer Trust had assets of $1,031,098,556

=== Funding details ===
Funding details as of December 31, 2018:
Revenue and support as of 2018: $77,572,930
1. Interest from investments (0.01%)
2. Dividends from investments (93.9%)
3. Net gain on sale of investments (3.00%)
4. Other income (3.10%)
Expenses as of 2018: $56,834,339
1. Operations and administration (10.3%)
2. Taxes (1.30%)
3. Grants and program-related investments (88.3%)
