= Delores Dufner =

American music composer

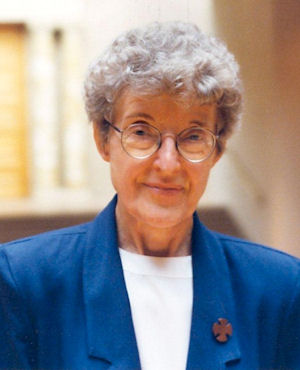
Delores Dufner OSB

Delores Dufner is an American sacred music composer, librettist, and organist whose works have been included in Catholic hymnals in the United States, Canada, the United Kingdom and Australia. Dufner is a nun of the Order of Saint Benedict at Saint Benedict's Monastery in Saint Joseph, Minnesota. She is on the faculty of Saint Benedict's College and Saint John's University, Collegeville, Minnesota. In 1994, Dufner was commissioned to write the libretto for the oratorio Choose Life, Uvacharta Bachayim. "One of the best-known hymn writers in the church today. More than twenty different publishers have included her texts in their hymnals and hymn collections. In 2017 Dufner received the Christus Rex (“Christ the King”) award from the Lutheran Valparaiso University.
