= Billings Symphony Orchestra =

Montana orchestra

The Billings Symphony Orchestra is an American orchestra based in Billings, Montana.

The symphony was founded in 1950, and the chorale was founded in 1955. The Billings Symphony serves South Central Montana, Eastern Montana and Northern Wyoming as the only symphony and chorale in the region. The Billings Symphony Orchestra regularly performs at the Alberta Bair Theater.

== Conductors ==
- 1950 to 1955 - Robert Staffanson
- 1955 to 1984 - George Perkins
- 1984 to 2004 - Uri Barnea (First full-time music director & Conductor.)
- 2005 to Present - Anne Harrigan
