= North Rhine-Westphalia =

State in Germany

North Rhine-Westphalia Nordrhein-Westfalen (German) Noordryn-Westfaulen (Low German)
- State
- Flag Coat of arms

- Location in Germany
- Coordinates: 51°28′N 7°33′E
- Country: Germany
- Founded: 23 August 1946
- Capital: Düsseldorf
- Largest city: Cologne

Government
  - Body: Landtag of North Rhine-Westphalia
  - Minister-President: Hendrik Wüst (CDU)
  - Governing parties: CDU / Greens
  - Bundesrat votes: 6 (of 69)
  - Bundestag seats: 136 (of 630) (as of 2025)

Area
  - Total: 34,112.72 km^{2} (13,170.99 sq mi)

Population (2023-06-30)
  - Total: 18,152,449
  - Rank: 1st in Germany
  - Density: 532.1314/km^{2} (1,378.214/sq mi)

GDP
  - Total: €909.411 billion (2025)
  - Per capita: €49,682 (2025)
- Time zone: UTC+1 (CET)
  - Summer (DST): UTC+2 (CEST)
- ISO 3166 code: DE-NW
- NUTS Region: DEA
- HDI (2023): 0.955 very high · 7th of 16
- Website: land.nrw/english

North Rhine-Westphalia or North-Rhine/Westphalia (German: Nordrhein-Westfalen [ˌnɔɐtʁaɪn vɛstˈfaːlən]), (Note: Limburgish: Noordrien-Wesfale [ˈnoːʀtʀiːn wæsˈfaːlə]; Low German: Noordryn-Westfaulen or Noordrhien-Westfalen) commonly shortened to NRW, (Note: German: [ɛnʔɛɐˈveː]) is a landlocked state (Land) in Western Germany. With more than 18 million inhabitants, it is the most populous state in Germany. Apart from the city-states (Berlin, Hamburg and Bremen), it is also the most densely populated state in Germany. Covering an area of 34,084 km^{2} (13,160 sq mi), it is the fourth-largest German state by size.

North Rhine-Westphalia features 30 of the 81 German municipalities with over 100,000 inhabitants, including Cologne (over 1 million), the state capital Düsseldorf (630,000), Dortmund and Essen (about 590,000 inhabitants each) and other cities predominantly located in the Rhine-Ruhr metropolitan area, the largest urban area in Germany and the fourth-largest on the European continent. The location of the Rhine-Ruhr at the heart of the European Blue Banana makes it well connected to other major European cities and metropolitan areas like the Randstad, the Flemish Diamond and the Frankfurt Rhine-Main Region.

North Rhine-Westphalia was established in 1946 after World War II from the Prussian provinces of Westphalia and the northern part of Rhine Province (North Rhine), and the Free State of Lippe by the British military administration in Allied-occupied Germany and became a state of the Federal Republic of Germany in 1949. The city of Bonn served as the federal capital until the reunification of Germany in 1990 and as the seat of government until 1999.

Culturally, North Rhine-Westphalia is not a uniform area; there are significant differences, especially in traditional customs, between the Rhineland region on the one hand and the regions of Westphalia and Lippe on the other. The state's economy is the largest among the German states by GRDP, although it ranks below the national average in GRDP per capita.

== History ==
=== Creation ===
The state of North Rhine-Westphalia was established by the British military administration's "Operation Marriage" on 23 August 1946 by merging the province of Westphalia and the northern parts of the Rhine Province, both being political divisions of the former state of Prussia within the German Reich. On 21 January 1947, the former state of Lippe was merged with North Rhine-Westphalia. The constitution of North Rhine-Westphalia was then ratified through a referendum.

=== Rhineland ===
The first written account of the area was by its conqueror, Julius Caesar, the territories west of the Rhine were occupied by the Eburones and east of the Rhine he reported the Ubii (across from Cologne) and the Sugambri to their north. The Ubii and some other Germanic tribes such as the Cugerni were later settled on the west side of the Rhine in the Roman province of Germania Inferior. Julius Caesar conquered the tribes on the left bank, and Augustus established numerous fortified posts on the Rhine, but the Romans never succeeded in gaining a firm footing on the right bank, where the Sugambri neighboured several other tribes including the Tencteri and Usipetes. North of the Sigambri and the Rhine region were the Bructeri.

As the power of the Roman Empire declined, many of these tribes came to be seen collectively as Ripuarian Franks and they pushed forward along both banks of the Rhine, and by the end of the fifth century had conquered all the lands that had formerly been under Roman influence. By the eighth century, the Frankish dominion was firmly established in western Germany and northern Gaul, but at the same time, to the north, Westphalia was being taken over by Saxons pushing south.

The Merovingian and Carolingian Franks eventually built an empire which controlled first their Ripuarian kin, and then the Saxons. On the division of the Carolingian Empire at the Treaty of Verdun, the part of the province to the east of the river fell to East Francia, while that to the west remained with the kingdom of Lotharingia.

By the time of Otto I (d. 973), both banks of the Rhine had become part of the Holy Roman Empire, and the Rhenish territory was divided between the duchies of Upper Lorraine on the Moselle and Lower Lorraine on the Meuse. The Ottonian dynasty had both Saxon and Frankish ancestry.

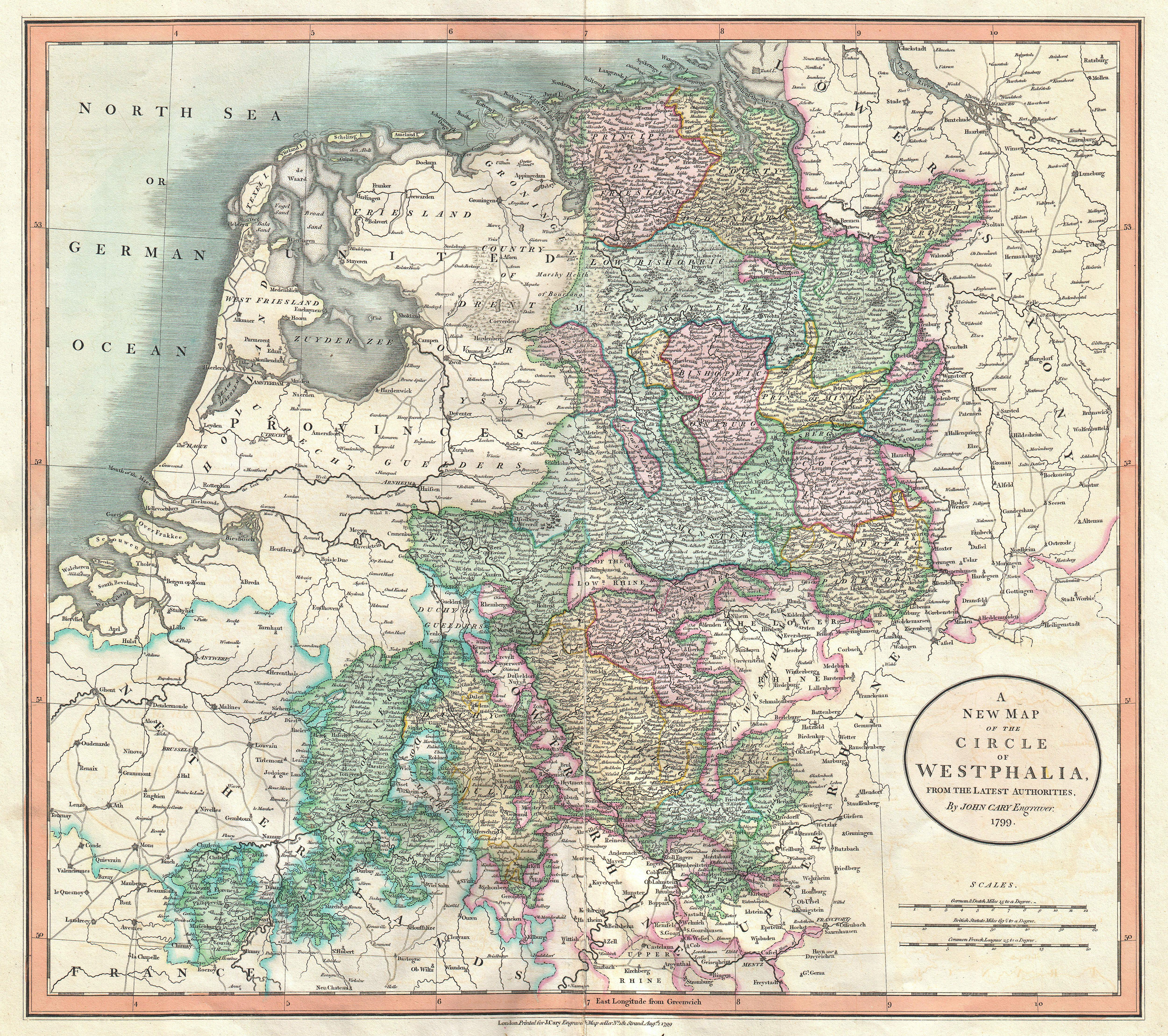
Map of the Lower Rhenish–Westphalian Circle in 1799 by John Cary

As the central power of the Holy Roman Emperor weakened, the Rhineland split into numerous small, independent, separate vicissitudes and special chronicles. The old Lotharingian divisions became obsolete, although the name survives for example in Lorraine in France, and throughout the Middle Ages and even into modern times, the nobility of these areas often sought to preserve the idea of a preeminent duke within Lotharingia, something claimed by the Dukes of Limburg, and the Dukes of Brabant. Such struggles as the War of the Limburg Succession therefore continued to create military and political links between what is now Rhineland-Westphalia and neighbouring Belgium and the Netherlands.

In spite of its dismembered condition and the sufferings it underwent at the hands of its French neighbours in various periods of warfare, the Rhenish territory prospered greatly and stood in the foremost rank of German culture and progress. Aachen was the place of coronation of the German emperors, and the ecclesiastical principalities of the Rhine bulked largely in German history.

Prussia first set foot on the Rhine in 1609 by the occupation of the Duchy of Cleves and about a century later Upper Guelders and Moers also became Prussian. At the Peace of Basel in 1795, the whole of the left bank of the Rhine was resigned to France, and in 1806, the Rhenish princes all joined the Confederation of the Rhine.

After the Congress of Vienna, Prussia was awarded the entire Rhineland, which included the Grand Duchy of Berg, the ecclesiastic electorates of Trier and Cologne, the free cities of Aachen and Cologne, and nearly a hundred small lordships and abbeys. The Prussian Rhine province was formed in 1822 and Prussia had the tact to leave the lower Rhenish districts in undisturbed possession of the liberal institutions to which they had become accustomed under the republican rule of the French. In 1920, the districts of Eupen and Malmedy were transferred to Belgium (see German-speaking Community of Belgium).

=== Westphalia ===
Around AD 1, numerous incursions occurred through Westphalia and perhaps even some permanent Roman or Romanized settlements. The Battle of Teutoburg Forest took place near Osnabrück and some of the Germanic tribes who fought at this battle came from the area of Westphalia. Charlemagne is thought to have spent considerable time in Paderborn and nearby parts. His Saxon Wars also partly took place in what is thought of as Westphalia today. Popular legends link his adversary Widukind to places near Detmold, Bielefeld, Lemgo, Osnabrück, and other places in Westphalia. Widukind was buried in Enger, which is also a subject of a legend.

Along with Angria, Eastphalia, and Nordalbingia, Westphalia (Westfalahi) was originally a district of the Duchy of Saxony. In 1180, Westphalia was elevated to the rank of a duchy by Emperor Barbarossa. The Duchy of Westphalia comprised only a small area south of the Lippe River.

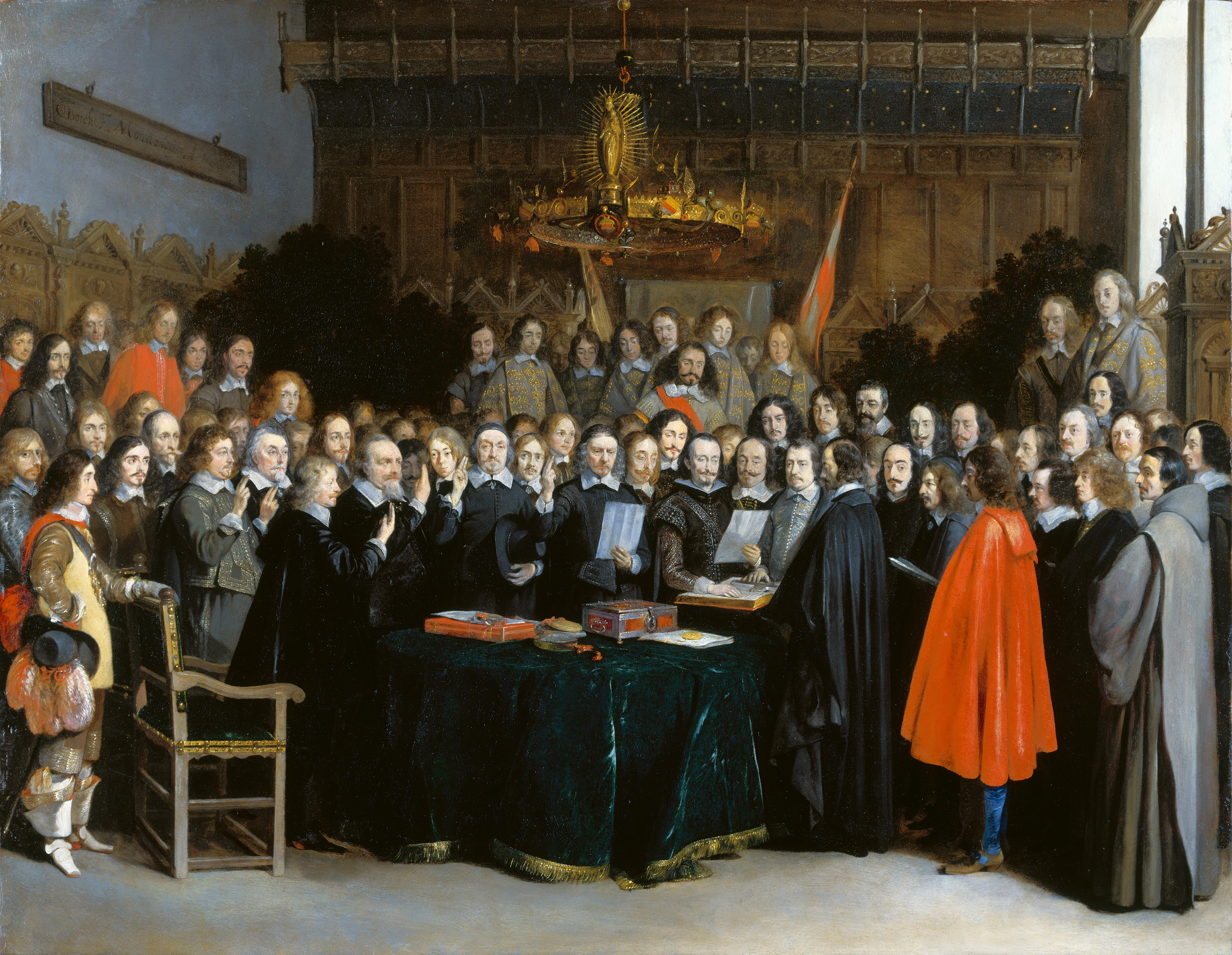
Ratification of the Peace of Westphalia of 1648 in Münster by Gerard Terborch

Parts of Westphalia came under Brandenburg-Prussian control during the 17th and 18th centuries, but most of it remained divided duchies and other feudal areas of power. The Peace of Westphalia of 1648, signed in Münster and Osnabrück, ended the Thirty Years' War. The concept of nation-state sovereignty resulting from the treaty became known as "Westphalian sovereignty".

As a result of the Protestant Reformation, there is no dominant religion in Westphalia. Catholicism and Lutheranism are on relatively equal footing. Lutheranism is strong in the eastern and northern parts with numerous free churches. Münster and especially Paderborn are thought of as Catholic. Osnabrück is divided almost equally between Catholicism and Protestantism.

After the defeat of the Prussian Army at the Battle of Jena-Auerstedt, the Treaty of Tilsit in 1807 made the Westphalian territories part of the Kingdom of Westphalia from 1807 to 1813. It was founded by Napoleon and was a French vassal state. This state only shared the name with the historical region; it contained only a relatively small part of Westphalia, consisting instead mostly of Hessian and Eastphalian regions.

After the Congress of Vienna, the Kingdom of Prussia received a large amount of territory in the Westphalian region and created the province of Westphalia in 1815. The northernmost portions of the former kingdom, including the town of Osnabrück, had become part of the states of Hanover and Oldenburg.

== Flags and coat of arms ==
The flag of North Rhine-Westphalia is green-white-red with the combined coats of arms of the Rhineland (white line before green background, symbolizing the river Rhine), Westfalen (the white horse) and Lippe (the red rose). After the establishment of North Rhine-Westphalia in 1946, the tricolor was first introduced in 1948, but was not formally adopted until 1953. The plain variant of the tricolor is considered the civil flag and state ensign, while government authorities use the state flag (Landesdienstflagge) which is defaced with the state's coat of arms. The state ensign can easily be mistaken for a distressed flag of Hungary, as well as the former national flag of Iran (1964–1980). The same flag was used by the Rhenish Republic (1923–1924) as a symbol of independence and freedom.

The horse on the coat of arms is a reference to the Saxon Steed, a heraldic motif associated with both Westphalia and Lower Saxony. The horse first featured in the 15th century coat of arms of the Duchy of Westphalia, before being inherited by the Prussian province of Westphalia and finally the modern state of North Rhine-Westphalia.

== Geography ==
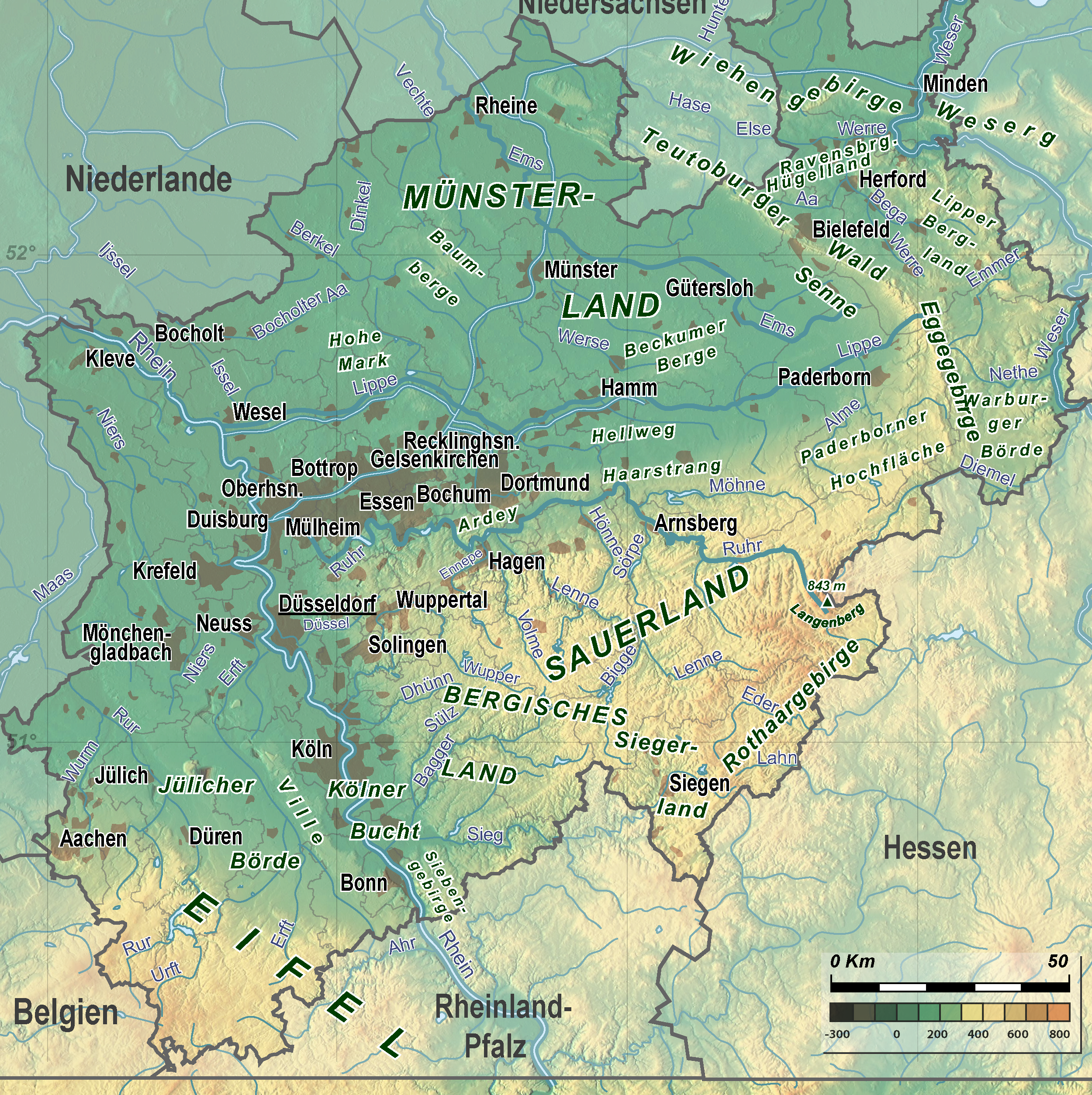
Geographic map of North Rhine-Westphalia

North Rhine-Westphalia encompasses the plains of the Lower Rhine region and parts of the Central Uplands (die Mittelgebirge) up to the gorge of Porta Westfalica. The state covers an area of 34,083 km^{2} (13,160 sq mi) and shares borders with Belgium (Wallonia) in the southwest and the Netherlands (Limburg, Gelderland and Overijssel) in the west and northwest. It has borders with the German states of Lower Saxony to the north and northeast, Rhineland-Palatinate to the south and Hesse to the southeast.

Approximately half of the state is located in the relative low-lying terrain of the Westphalian Lowland and the Rhineland, both extending broadly into the North German Plain. A few isolated hill ranges are located within these lowlands, among them the Hohe Mark, the Beckum Hills, the Baumberge and the Stemmer Berge. The terrain rises towards the south and in the east of the state into parts of Germany's Central Uplands. These hill ranges are the Weser Uplands – including the Egge Hills, the Wiehen Hills, the Wesergebirge and the Teutoburg Forest in the east, the Sauerland, the Bergisches Land, the Siegerland and the Siebengebirge in the south, as well as the left-Rhenish Eifel in the southwest of the state. The Rothaargebirge in the border region with Hesse rises to height of about 800 m above sea level. The highest of these mountains are the Langenberg, at 843.2 m above sea level, the Kahler Asten (840.7 m) and the Clemensberg (839.2 m).

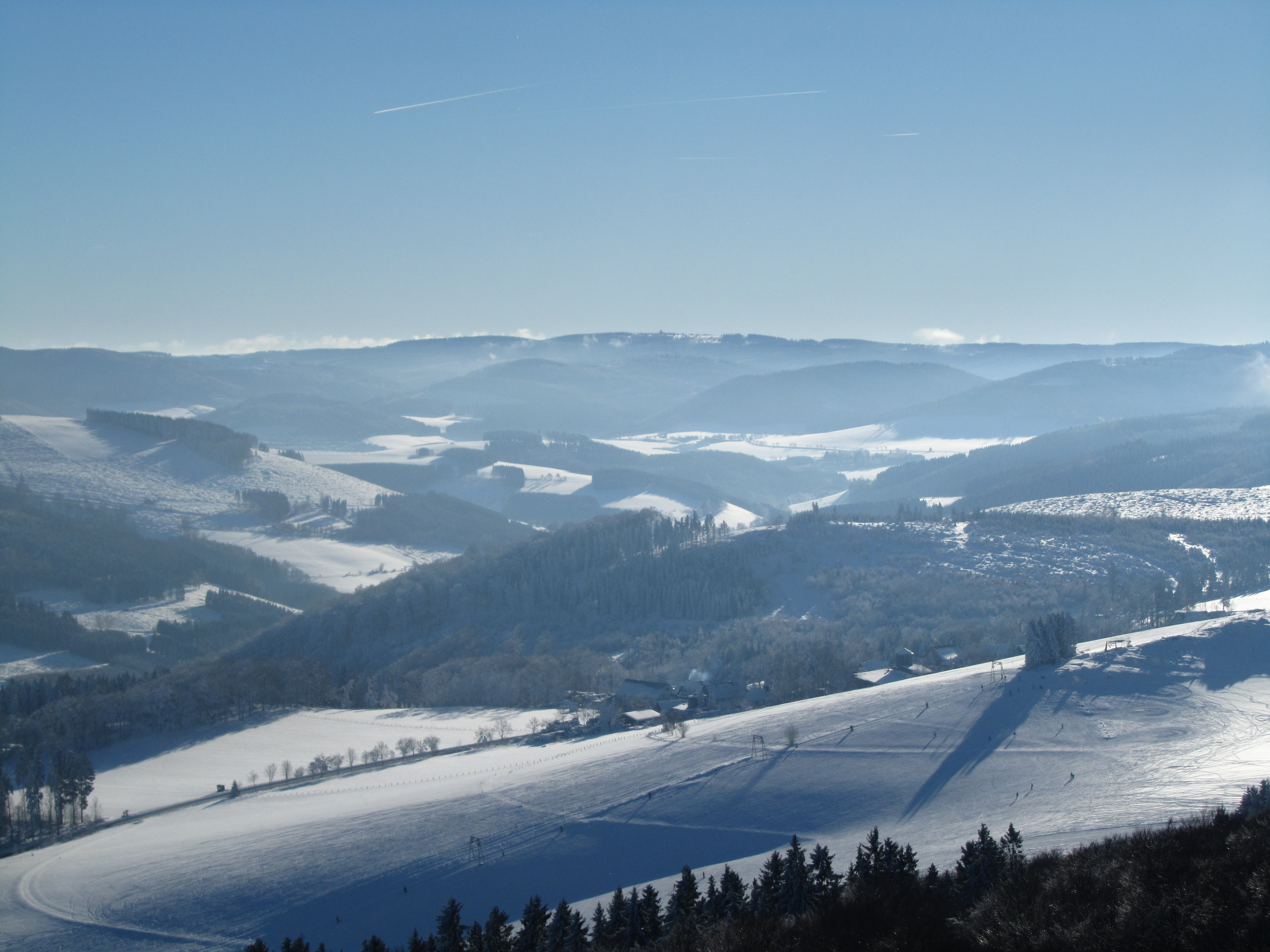
The highest peaks in North Rhine-Westphalia are located in the Rothaar Mountains.

The planimetrically determined centre of North Rhine-Westphalia is located in the south of Dortmund-Aplerbeck in the Aplerbecker Mark (51° 28' N, 7° 33' Ö). Its westernmost point is situated near Selfkant close to the Dutch border, the easternmost near Höxter on the Weser. The southernmost point lies near Hellenthal in the Eifel region. The northernmost point is the NRW-Nordpunkt near Rahden in the northeast of the state. The Nordpunkt has located the only 100 km to the south of the North Sea coast. The deepest natural dip is arranged in the district Zyfflich in the city of Kranenburg with 9.2 m above sea level in the northwest of the state. Though, the deepest point overground results from mining. The open-pit Hambach reaches at Niederzier a deep of 293 m below sea level. At the same time, this is the deepest human-made dip in Germany.

The most important rivers flowing at least partially through North Rhine-Westphalia include: the Rhine, the Ruhr, the Ems, the Lippe, and the Weser. The Rhine is by far the most important river in North Rhine-Westphalia: it enters the state as Middle Rhine near Bad Honnef, where still being part of the Mittelrhein wine region. It changes into the Lower Rhine near Bad Godesberg and leaves North Rhine-Westphalia near Emmerich at a width of 730 metres. Almost immediately after entering the Netherlands, the Rhine splits into many branches.

The Pader, which flows entirely within the city of Paderborn, is considered Germany's shortest river.

For many, North Rhine-Westphalia is synonymous with industrial areas and urban agglomerations. However, the largest part of the state is used for agriculture (almost 52%) and forests (25%).

=== Subdivisions ===
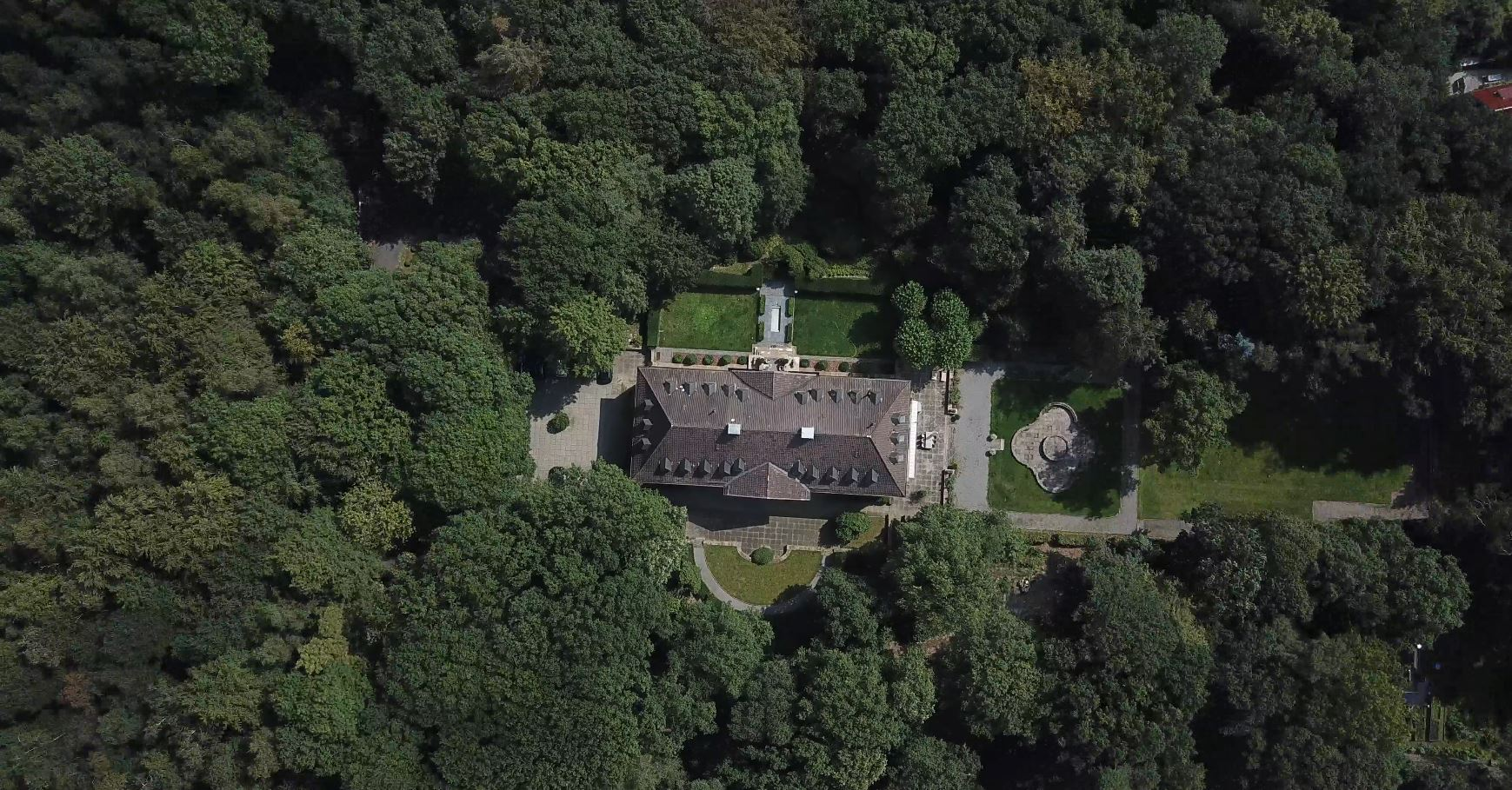
Haus Höhe, Briller Viertel, Wuppertal

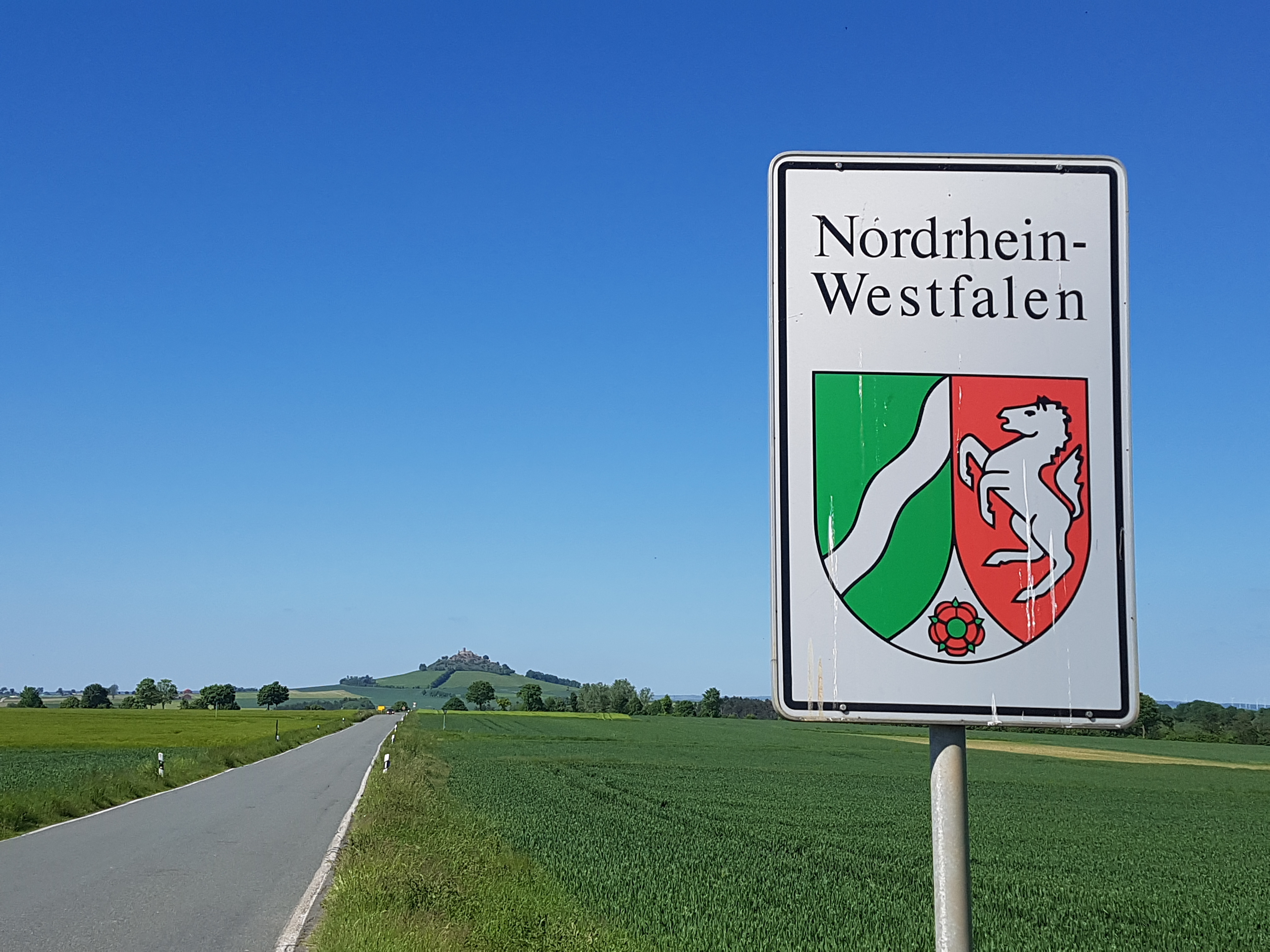
State border with North Rhine-Westphalia near Warburg; in the background the Desenberg, with 345 m landmark and highest point in the Warburger Börde near the border triangle NRW - Hesse - Lower Saxony

The state consists of five government regions (Regierungsbezirke), divided into 31 districts (Kreise) and 23 urban districts (kreisfreie Städte). In total, North Rhine-Westphalia has 396 municipalities (1997), including the urban districts, which are municipalities by themselves. The government regions have an assembly elected by the districts and municipalities, while the Landschaftsverband has a directly elected assembly.

The five government regions of North Rhine-Westphalia each belong to one of the two Landschaftsverbände:

Landschaftsverband Rhineland			Landschaftsverband Westfalen-Lippe			The regional authorities Rhineland (green) and Westphalia-Lippe (red)
Government districts (Regierungsbezirke)		historical regions	Government districts (Regierungsbezirke)		historical regions	The regional authorities Rhineland (green) and Westphalia-Lippe (red)
Düsseldorf	Regierungsbezirk Düsseldorf	Rhineland; Bergisches Land; Eifel; Aachen; Lower Rhine; Rheinschiene; Cologne/Bonn	Arnsberg	Regierungsbezirk Arnsberg	Westphalia; Münsterland; Minden-Ravensberg; Prince-Bishopric Paderborn; Sauerland; Siegerland; Tecklenburger Land; Lippe; Lipper Land, the region of the ancient free state	The regional authorities Rhineland (green) and Westphalia-Lippe (red)
Köln	Regierungsbezirk Köln	Rhineland; Bergisches Land; Eifel; Aachen; Lower Rhine; Rheinschiene; Cologne/Bonn	Detmold	Regierungsbezirk Detmold	Westphalia; Münsterland; Minden-Ravensberg; Prince-Bishopric Paderborn; Sauerland; Siegerland; Tecklenburger Land; Lippe; Lipper Land, the region of the ancient free state	The regional authorities Rhineland (green) and Westphalia-Lippe (red)
		Rhineland; Bergisches Land; Eifel; Aachen; Lower Rhine; Rheinschiene; Cologne/Bonn	Münster	Regierungsbezirk Münster	Westphalia; Münsterland; Minden-Ravensberg; Prince-Bishopric Paderborn; Sauerland; Siegerland; Tecklenburger Land; Lippe; Lipper Land, the region of the ancient free state	The regional authorities Rhineland (green) and Westphalia-Lippe (red)

Rural Districts (Kreise)	Urban Districts (Kreisfreie Städte)
1. Aachen Städteregion; 2. Borken; 3. Coesfeld; 4. Düren; 5. Ennepe-Ruhr-Kreis; 6. Rhein-Erft-Kreis; 7. Euskirchen; 8. Gütersloh; 9. Heinsberg; 10. Herford; 11. Hochsauerlandkreis; 12. Höxter; 13. Kleve; 14. Lippe; 15. Märkischer Kreis; 16. Mettmann; 17. Minden-Lübbecke; 18. Rhein-Kreis Neuss; 19. Oberbergischer Kreis; 20. Olpe; 21. Paderborn; 22. Recklinghausen; 23. Rheinisch-Bergischer Kreis; 24. Rhein-Sieg-Kreis; 25. Siegen-Wittgenstein; 26. Soest; 27. Steinfurt; 28. Unna; 29. Viersen; 30. Warendorf; 31. Wesel	1. Aachen; 2. Bielefeld; 3. Bochum; 4. Bonn; 5. Bottrop; 6. Dortmund; 7. Duisburg; 8. Düsseldorf; 9. Essen; 10. Gelsenkirchen; 11. Hagen; 12. Hamm; 13. Herne; 14. Cologne / Köln; 15. Krefeld; 16. Leverkusen; 17. Mönchengladbach; 18. Mülheim; 19. Münster; 20. Oberhausen; 21. Remscheid; 22. Solingen; 23. Wuppertal

=== Borders ===
The state's area covers a maximum distance of 291 km from north to south, and 266 km from east to west. The total length of the state's borders is 1,645 km. The following countries and states have a border with North Rhine-Westphalia:

- Belgium (99 km)
- Netherlands (387 km)
- Lower Saxony (583 km)
- Hesse (269 km)
- Rhineland-Palatinate (307 km)

== Demographics ==
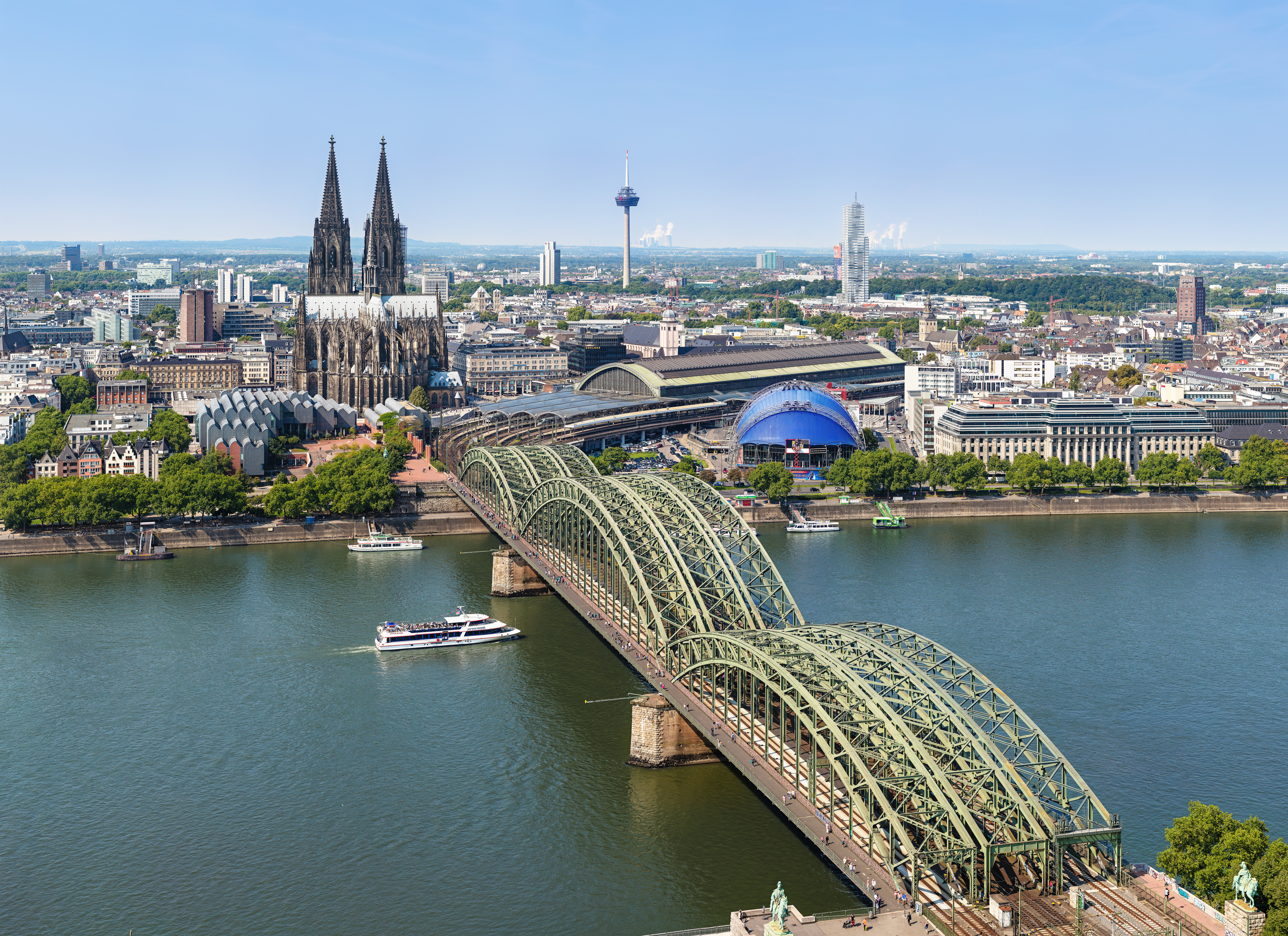
Cologne

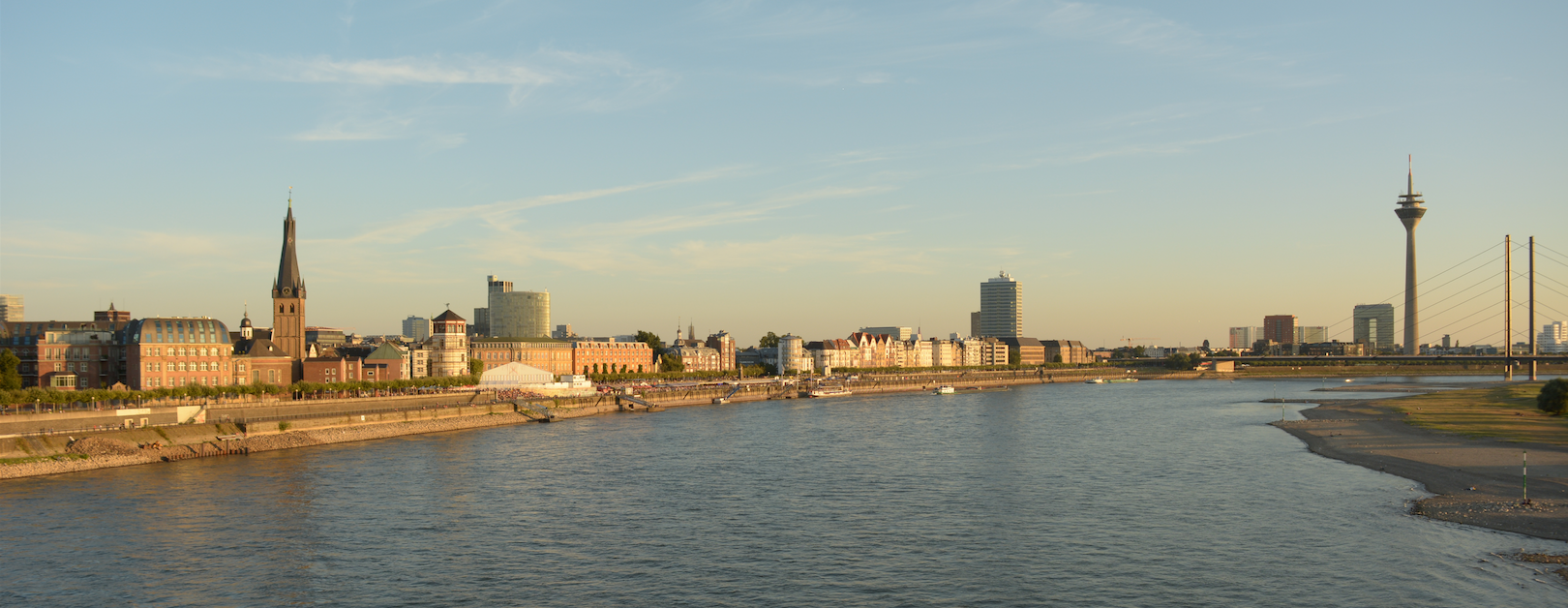
Düsseldorf

North Rhine-Westphalia has a population of approximately 18.1 million inhabitants and is centred around the polycentric Rhine-Ruhr metropolitan region, which includes the industrial Ruhr region with the largest city of Dortmund and the Rhenish cities of Bonn, Cologne and Düsseldorf. 30 of the 80 largest cities in Germany are located within North Rhine-Westphalia. The state's capital is Düsseldorf; the state's largest city is Cologne. In 2022, there were 164,496 births and 234,176 deaths.

Significant foreign resident populations
Nationality	Population (2022)	Population (2023)
Turkey	487,145	492,460
Syria	271,275	286,035
Ukraine	243,150	251,195
Poland	221,530	222,360
Romania	164,480	168,710
Italy	143,165	141,135
Bulgaria	97,615	106,165
Greece	102,425	98,225
Iraq	94,385	94,420
Serbia	68,590	70,195
Afghanistan	62,375	69,335
Netherlands	70,315	68,760
Kosovo	65,580	68,570
Russia	52,735	59,070
Spain	56,180	58,010
Croatia	58,635	57,070
Bosnia and Herzegovina	45,305	46,925
Morocco	42,695	44,115

The following table shows the ten largest cities of North Rhine-Westphalia:

Pos.	Name	Pop. 2020	Area (km^{2})	Pop. per km^{2}	Map
1	Cologne	1,083,498	405.15	2,668	
2	Düsseldorf	620,523	217.01	2,839	
3	Dortmund	587,696	280.37	2,090	
4	Essen	582,415	210.38	2,774	
5	Duisburg	495,885	232.81	2,140	
6	Bochum	364,454	145.43	2,509	
7	Wuppertal	355,004	168.37	2,100	
8	Bielefeld	333,509	257.83	1,285	
9	Bonn	330,579	141.22	2,307	
10	Münster	316,403	302.91	1,034	

=== Historical population ===
The following table shows the population of the state since 1930. The values until 1960 are the average of the yearly population, from 1965 the population at year end is used.

Historical population

Year	Pop.	±% p.a.
1930	11,407,000	—
1940	12,059,000	+0.56%
1950	12,926,000	+0.70%
1955	14,442,000	+2.24%
1960	15,694,000	+1.68%

Year	Pop.	±% p.a.
1965	16,619,450	+1.15%
1970	17,033,651	+0.49%
1975	17,429,200	+0.46%
1980	18,057,488	+0.71%
1985	17,474,001	−0.65%

Year	Pop.	±% p.a.
1990	17,849,651	+0.43%
1995	18,393,045	+0.60%
2001	19,152,092	+0.68%
2011	19,538,251	+0.20%
2022	19,890,489	+0.16%

=== Vital statistics ===
- Births from January–September 2016 = ▲130,025
- Births from January–September 2017 = ▲130,088
- Deaths from January–September 2016 = ▼150,018
- Deaths from January–September 2017 = ▲153,435
- Natural growth from January–September 2016 = ▲ −19,993
- Natural growth from January–September 2017 = ▼ −23,347

Source: Statistische Ämter des Bundes Und der Länder

=== Religion ===
Religion in North Rhine-Westphalia – 2025
Religion	Percent
None or other	49.1%
Roman Catholicism	31.2%
EKD Protestantism	19.7%

As of 2025, 31.2% of the population of the state adhered to the Roman Catholic Church, 19.7% to the Protestant Church in Germany, and 49.1% of the population was irreligious or adhered to other denominations or religions. North Rhine-Westphalia ranks first in population among German states for both Roman Catholics and Protestants.

In 2016, the interior ministry of North Rhine-Westphalia reported that the number of mosques with a Salafist influence had increased from three to nine, which indicated both an actual increase and improved reporting. According to German authorities, Salafism is incompatible with the principles codified in the Constitution of the Federal Republic of Germany, in particular: democracy, the rule of law, and political order based on human rights.

== Politics ==
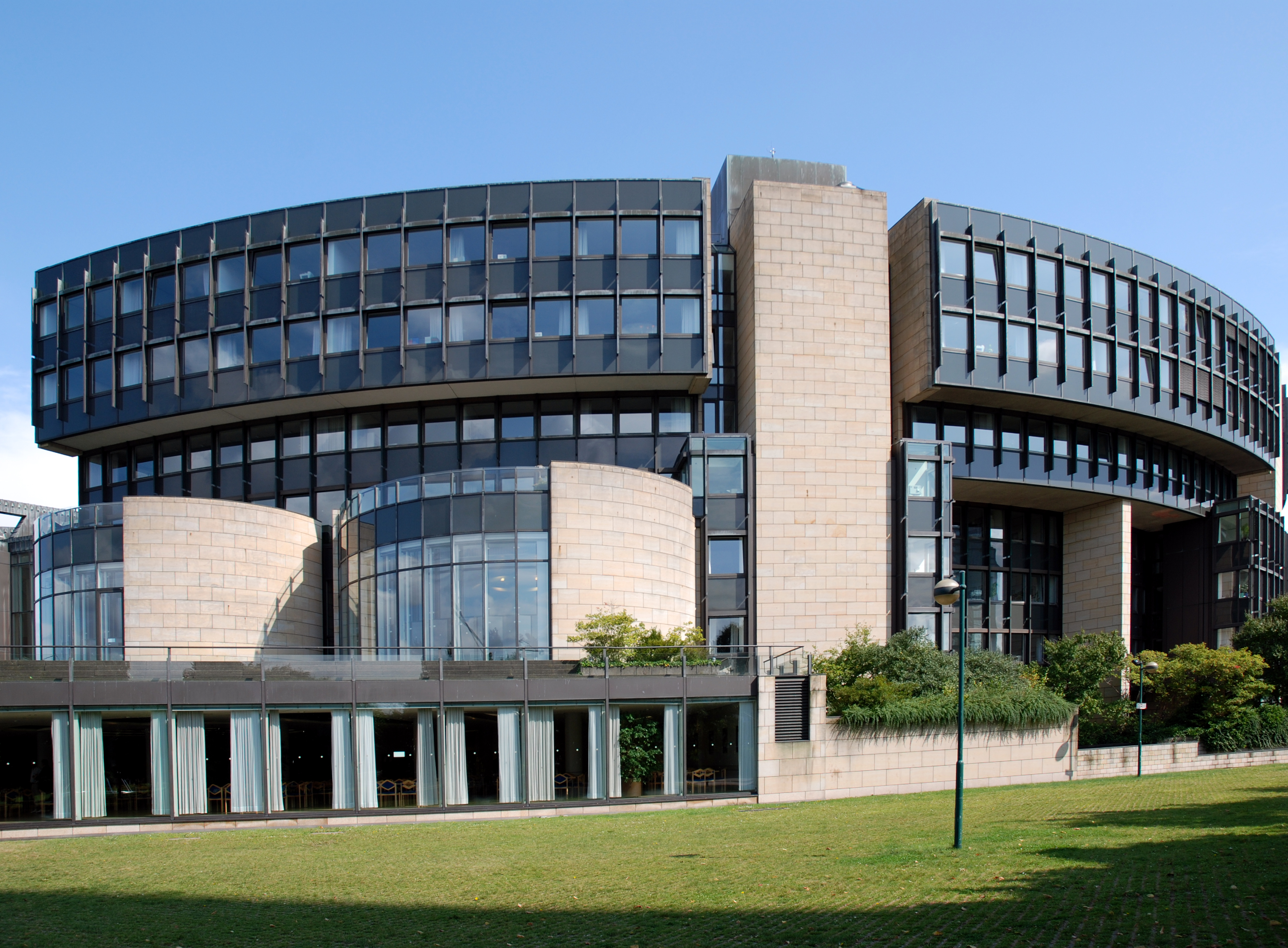
Landtag in Düsseldorf

The politics of North Rhine-Westphalia takes place within a framework of a federal parliamentary representative democratic republic. The two main parties are, as on the federal level, the centre-right Christian Democratic Union and the centre-left Social Democratic Party. From 1966 to 2005, North Rhine-Westphalia was continuously governed by the Social Democrats or SPD-led governments.

The state's legislative body is the Landtag ("state parliament house"). It may pass laws within the competency of the state, e.g. cultural matters, the education system, matters of internal security, i.e. the police, building supervision, health supervision and the media; as opposed to matters that are reserved to Federal law.

North Rhine-Westphalia uses the same electoral system as the Federal level in Germany: "Personalized proportional representation". Every five years the citizens of North Rhine-Westphalia vote in a general election to elect at least 181 members of the Landtag. Only parties who win at least 5% of the votes cast may be represented in parliament.

The Landtag, the parliamentary parties and groups consisting of at least 7 members of parliament have the right to table legal proposals to the Landtag for deliberation. The law that is passed by the Landtag is delivered to the Minister-President, who, together with the ministers involved, is required to sign it and announce it in the Law and Ordinance Gazette.

=== Landtag after 2022 Election ===
Party	Seats	+/–
Christian Democratic Union of Germany (CDU)	76	▲4
Social Democratic Party of Germany (SPD)	56	▼13
Alliance 90/The Greens (GRÜNE)	39	▲25
Free Democratic Party (FDP)	12	▼16
Alternative for Germany (AfD)	12	▼4
Total	195	

The vote was held on 15 May 2022. In the aftermath of the 2022 election, the Christian Democrats (CDU) and the Social Democratic Party (SPD) both had talks with the Greens. An alliance between the Greens and the SPD would have required the help of the Free Democratic Party (FDP) to gain a majority, but the FDP did not take part in these conversations. Rather, its top candidate believed that a Green/CDU alliance was the most likely outcome. All mainstream parties tend to refuse to cooperate with the right-wing Alternative for Germany (AfD). Ultimately, the CDU/Green alliance was the one that prevailed. The new coalition reelected Hendrik Wüst, who had been the Minister President of North Rhine-Westphalia during the last portion of the previous CDU/FDP coalition on 28 June 2022.

=== List of minister-presidents ===
These are the minister-presidents of North Rhine-Westphalia:

Minister-presidents of North Rhine-Westphalia
No.	Name	Image	Born-Died	Party affiliation	Start of tenure	End of tenure
1	Rudolf Amelunxen		1888–1969	Centre Party	1946	1947
2	Karl Arnold		1901–1958	CDU	1947	1956
3	Fritz Steinhoff		1897–1969	SPD	1956	1958
4	Franz Meyers		1908–2002	CDU	1958	1966
5	Heinz Kühn		1912–1992	SPD	1966	1978
6	Johannes Rau		1931–2006	SPD	1978	1998
7	Wolfgang Clement		1940–2020	SPD	1998	2002
8	Peer Steinbrück		*1947	SPD	2002	2005
9	Jürgen Rüttgers		*1951	CDU	2005	2010
10	Hannelore Kraft		*1961	SPD	2010	2017
11	Armin Laschet		*1961	CDU	2017	2021
12	Hendrik Wüst		*1975	CDU	2021	Current

For further information on the current state government, see Wüst cabinet.

== Culture ==
=== Architecture and building monuments ===
- The state is known for the most castles and fortresses in Germany.
- North Rhine-Westphalia has a high concentration of museums, cultural centres, concert halls and theatres.

==== Historic monuments ====
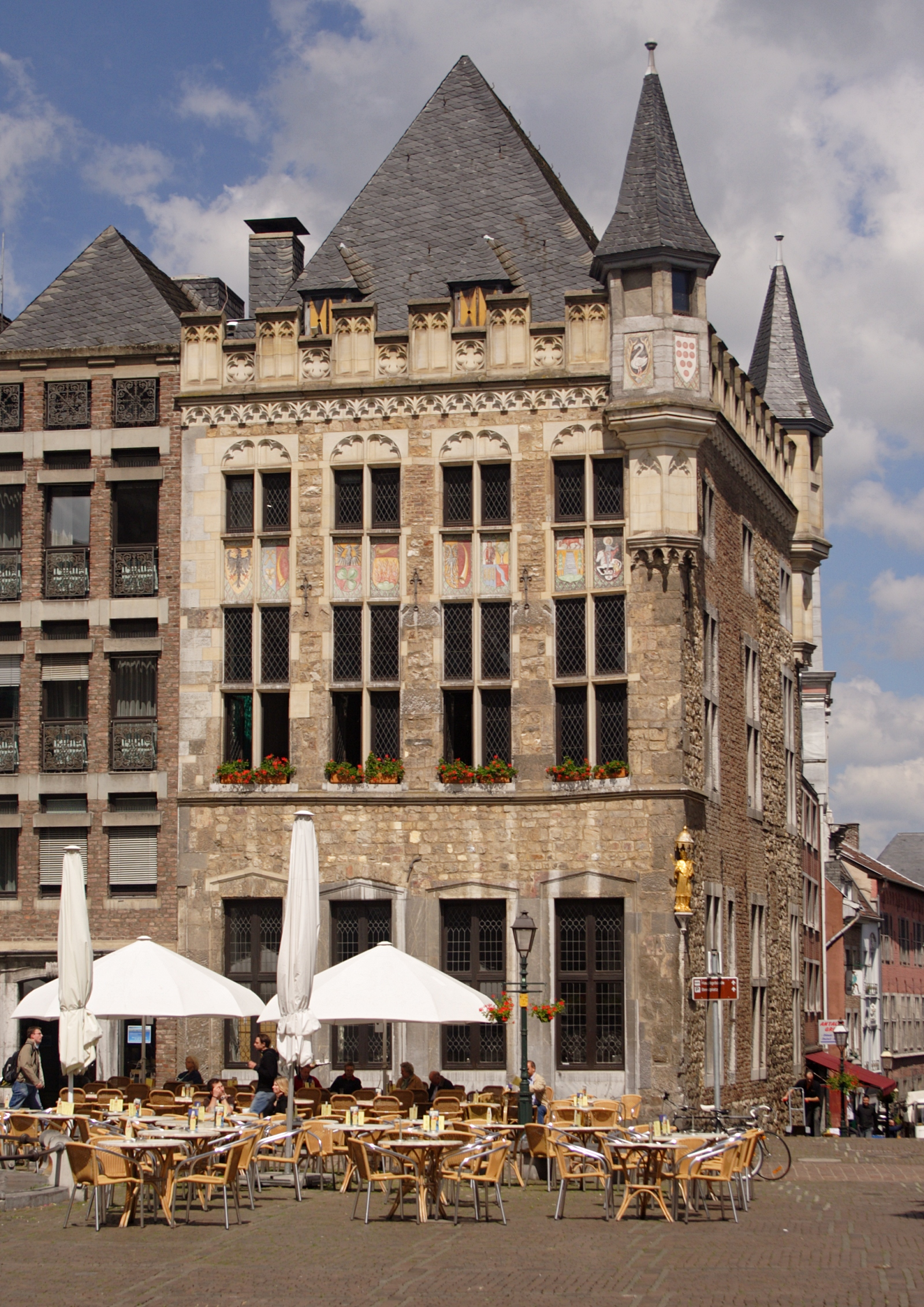
Medieval architecture in Aachen

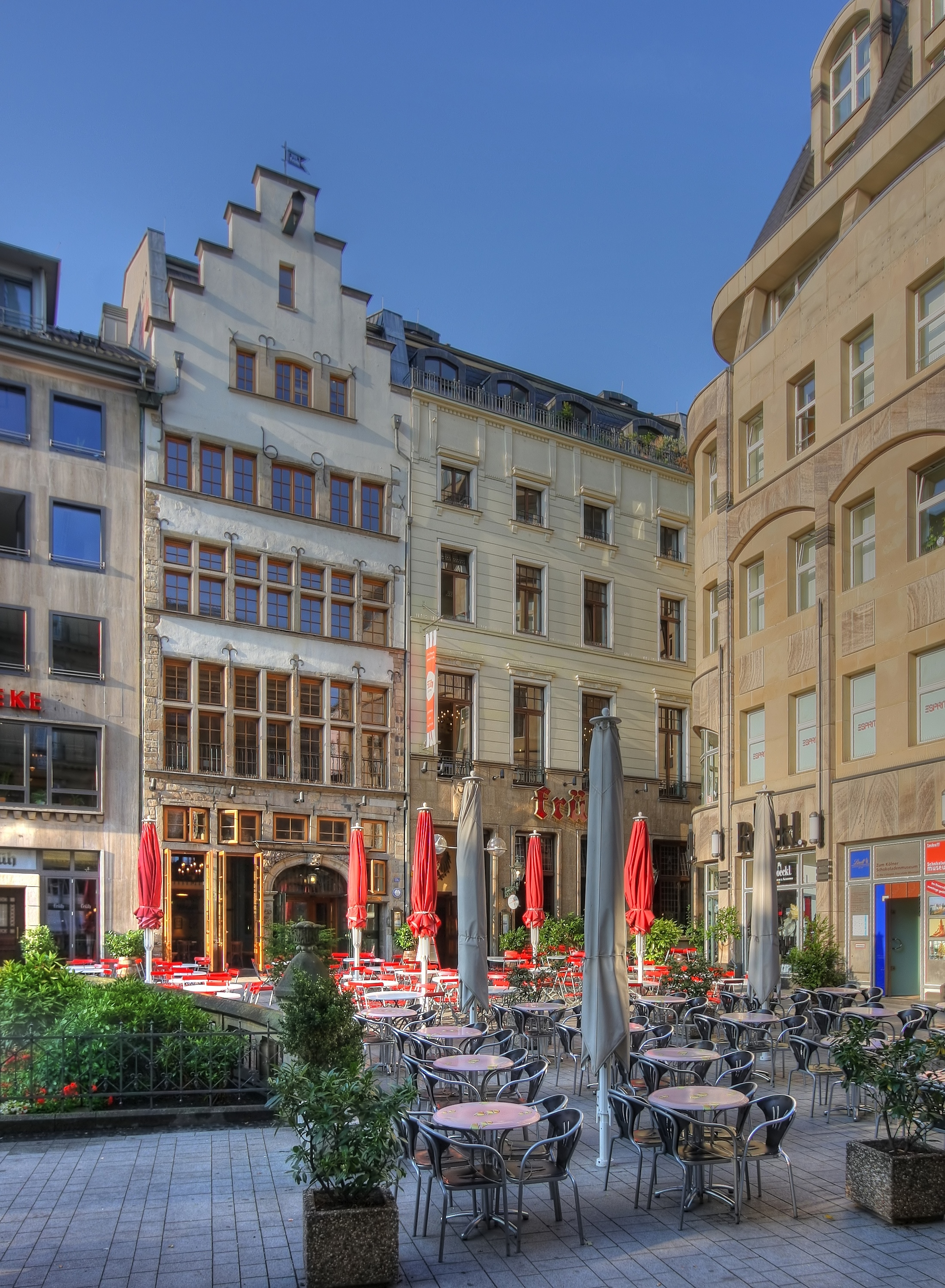
Cölner Hofbräu Früh in Cologne

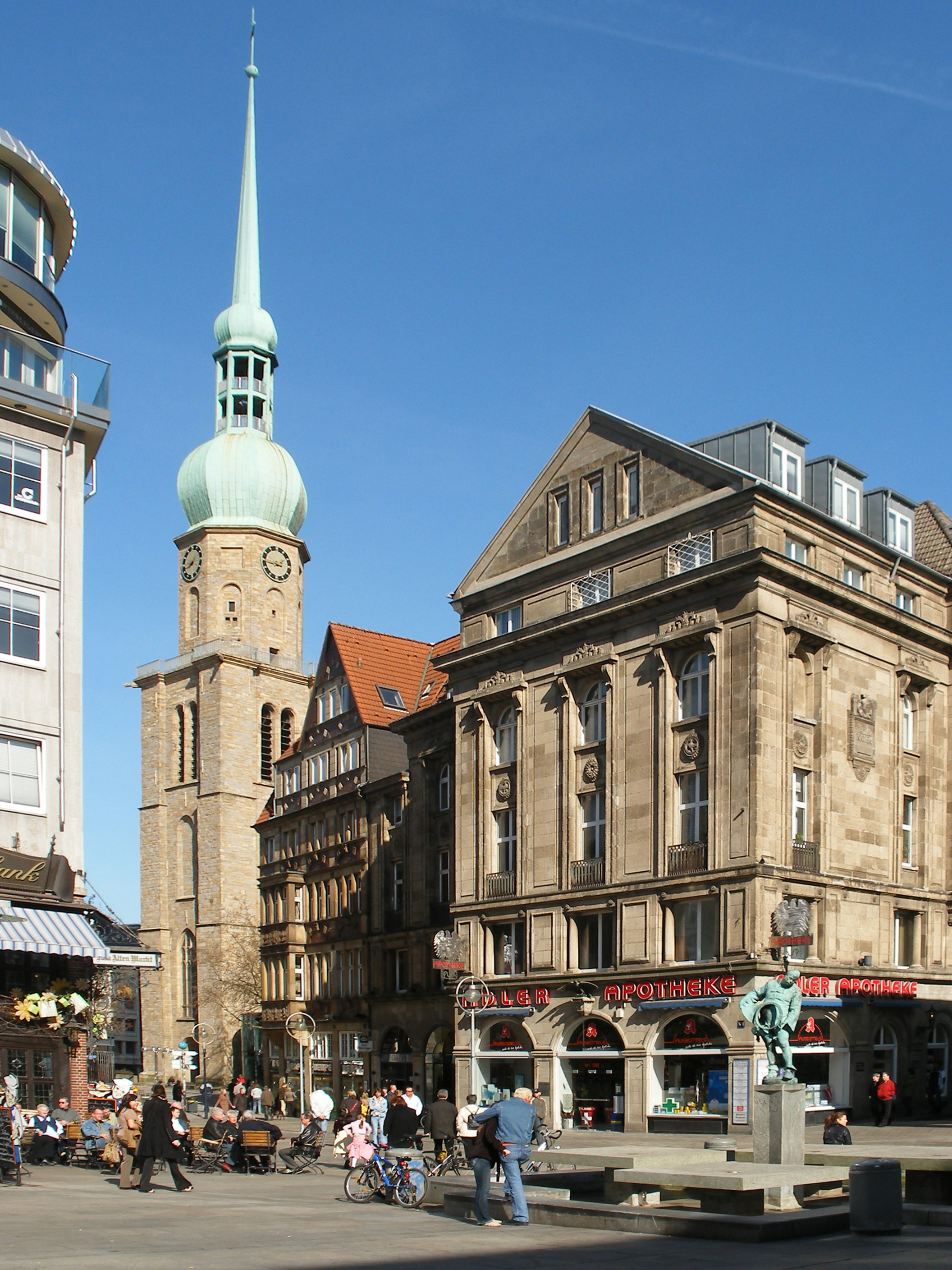
Reinoldikirche and Alter Markt in Dortmund

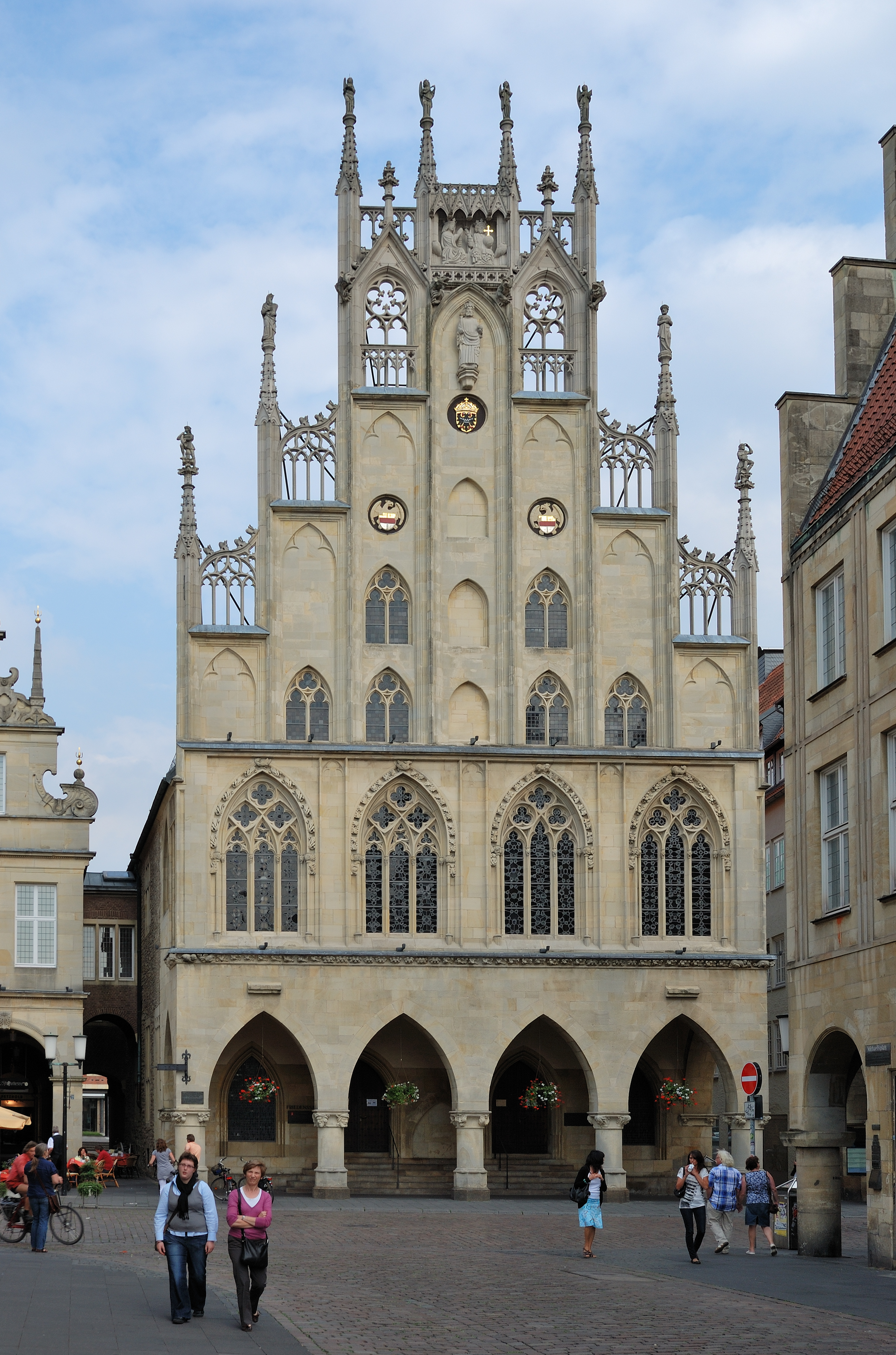
The Historical City Hall in Münster

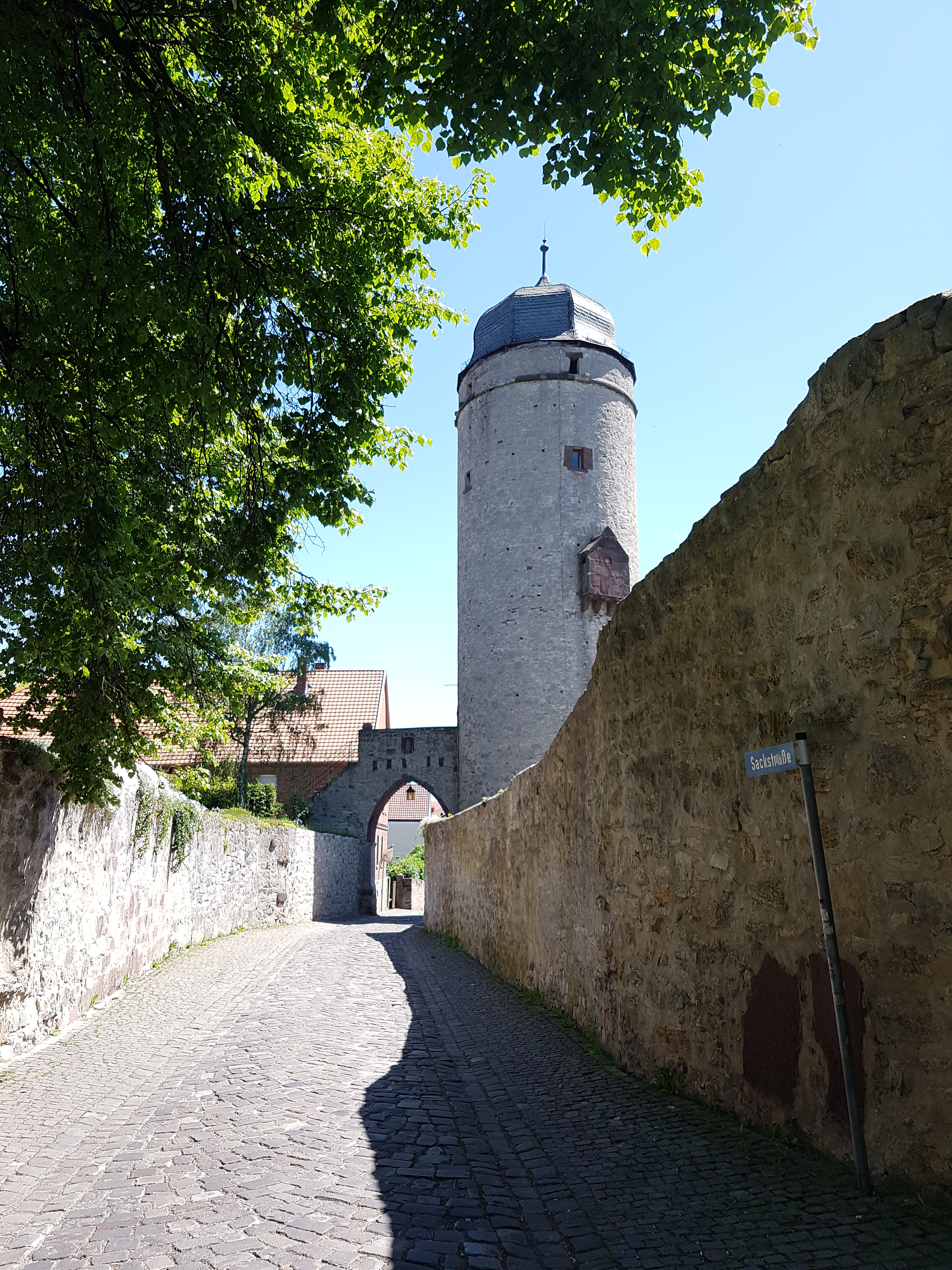
Gate and Tower of the medieval town-fortification in Warburg

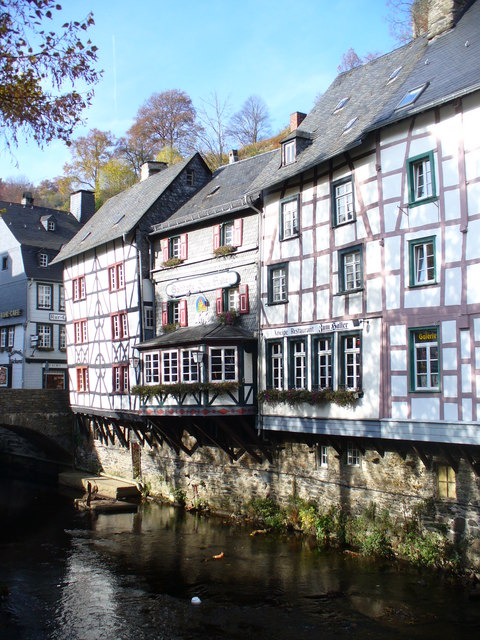
Timber framing in Monschau

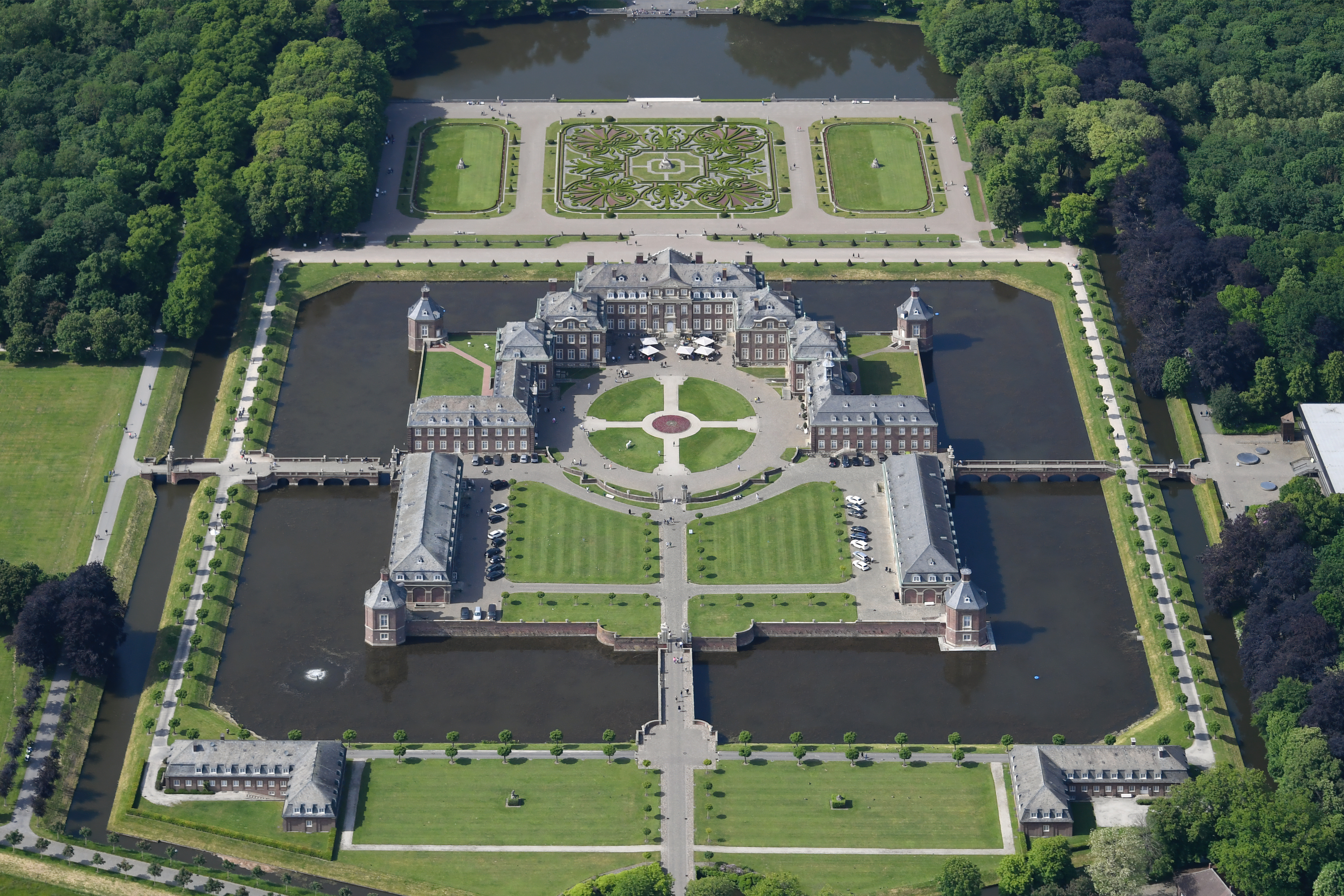
Schloss Nordkirchen

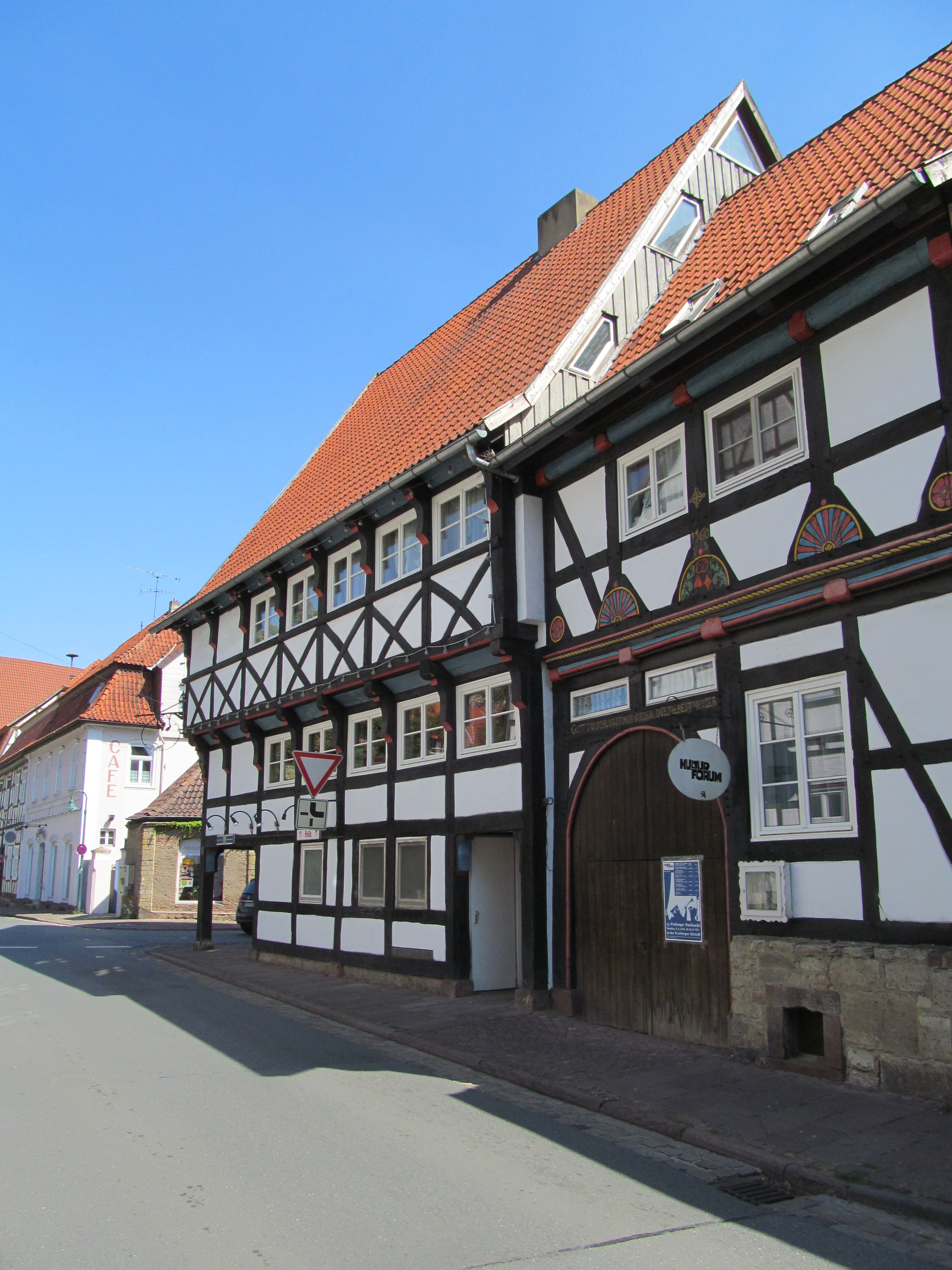
Eckmaenneken-House in Warburg; eldest-dated timber-framed-house of Westphalia

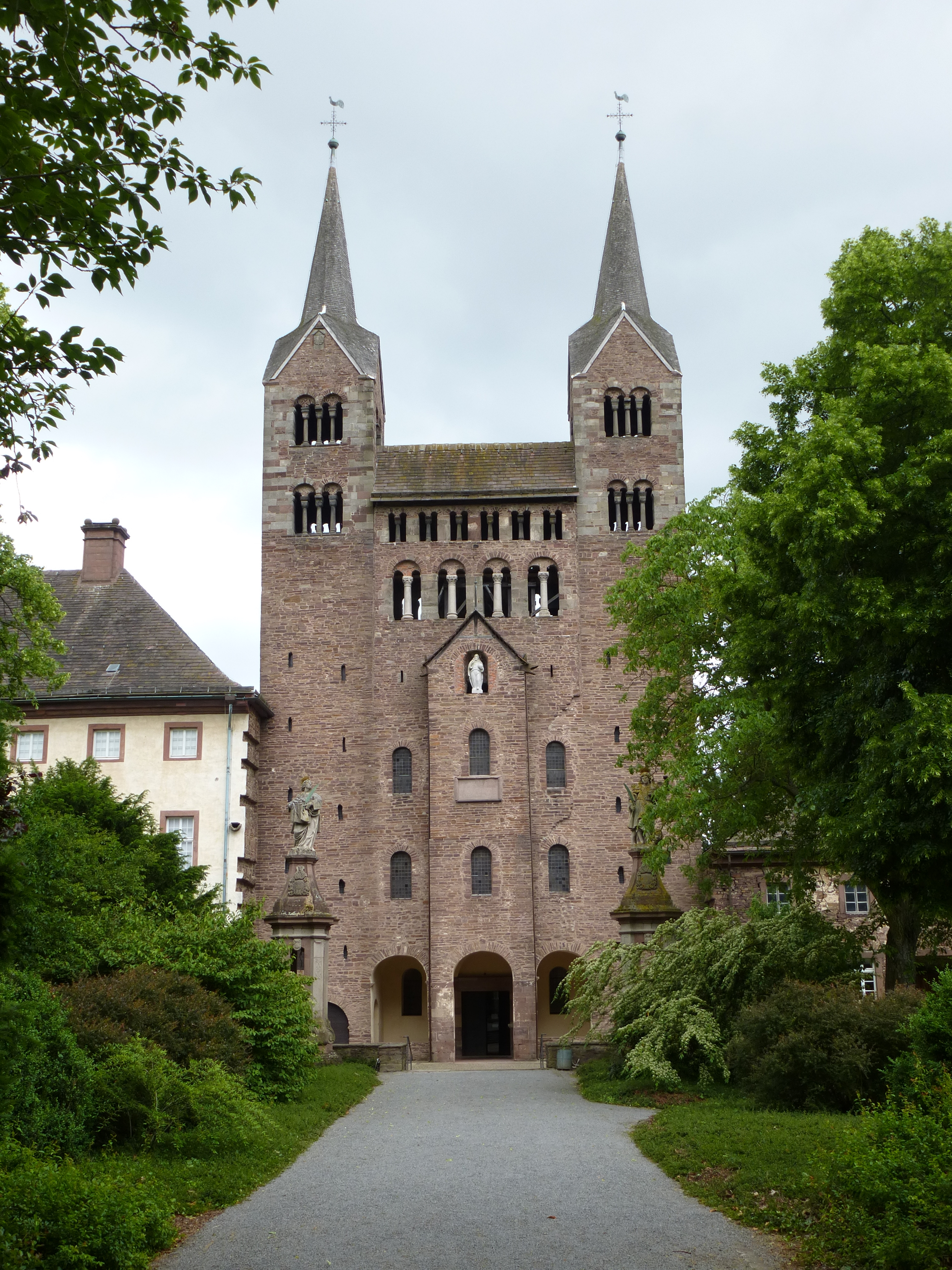
Princely Abbey of Corvey nearby City of Höxter

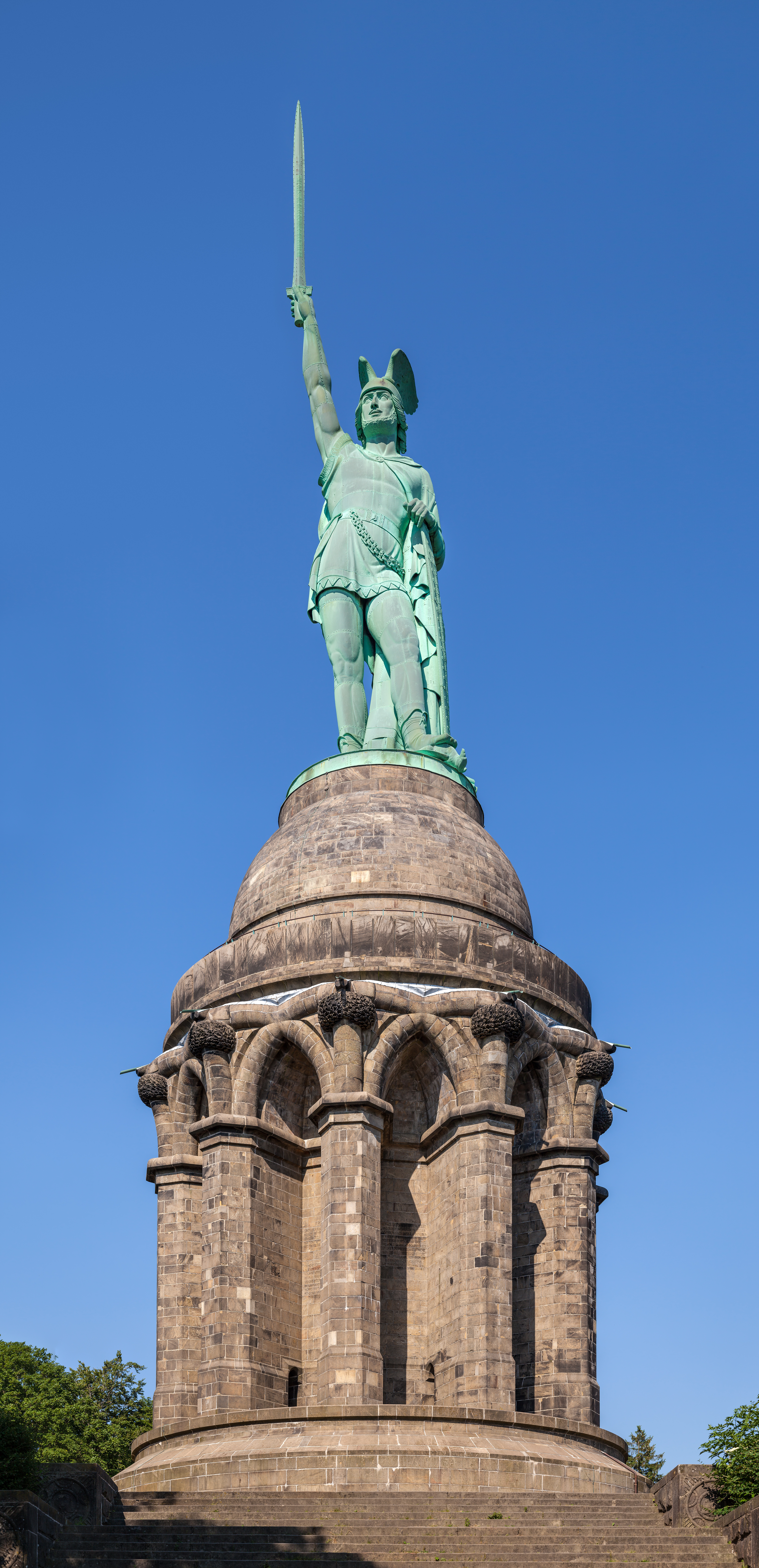
Hermann's Monument nearby Detmold

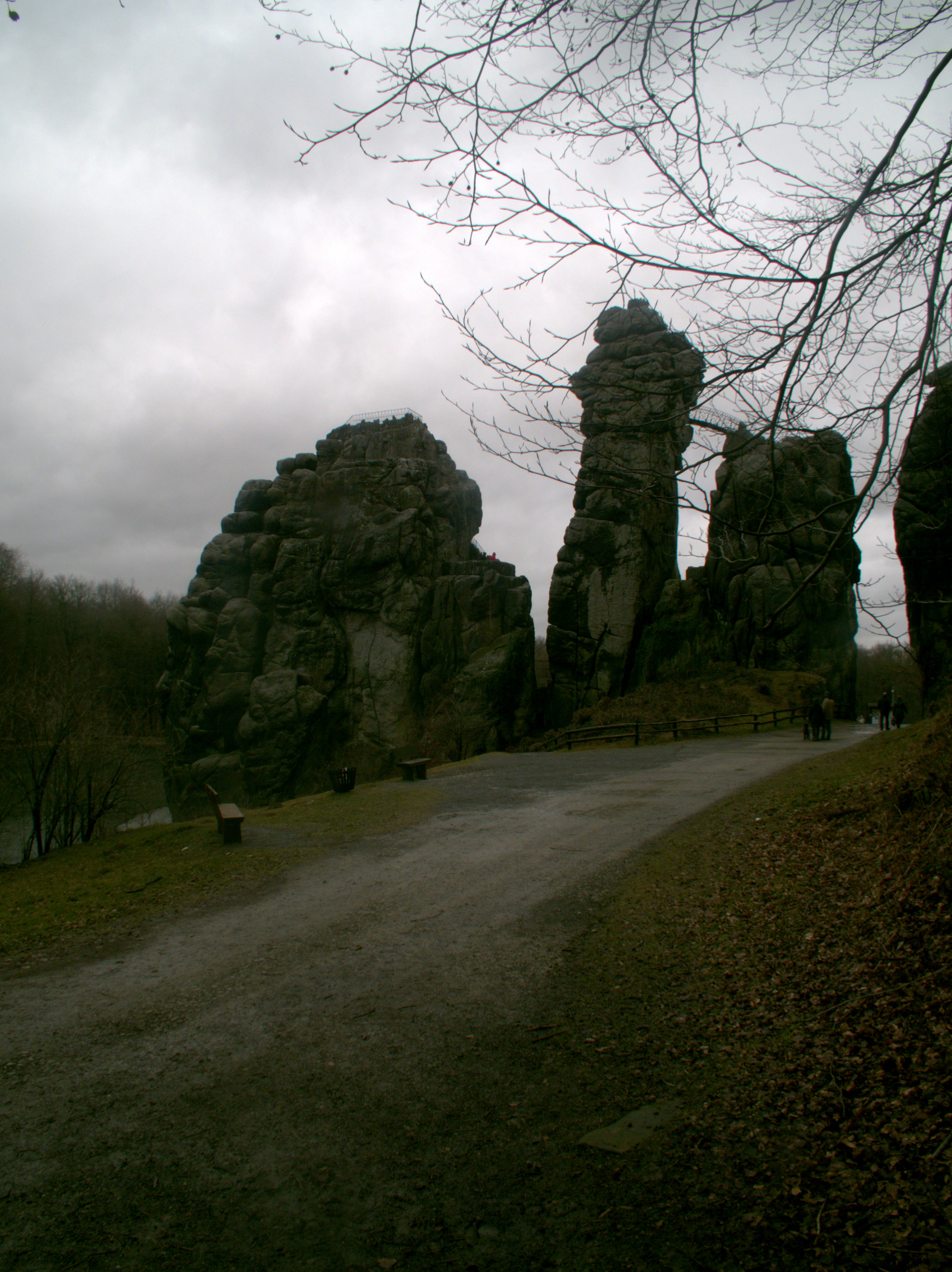
Externsteine

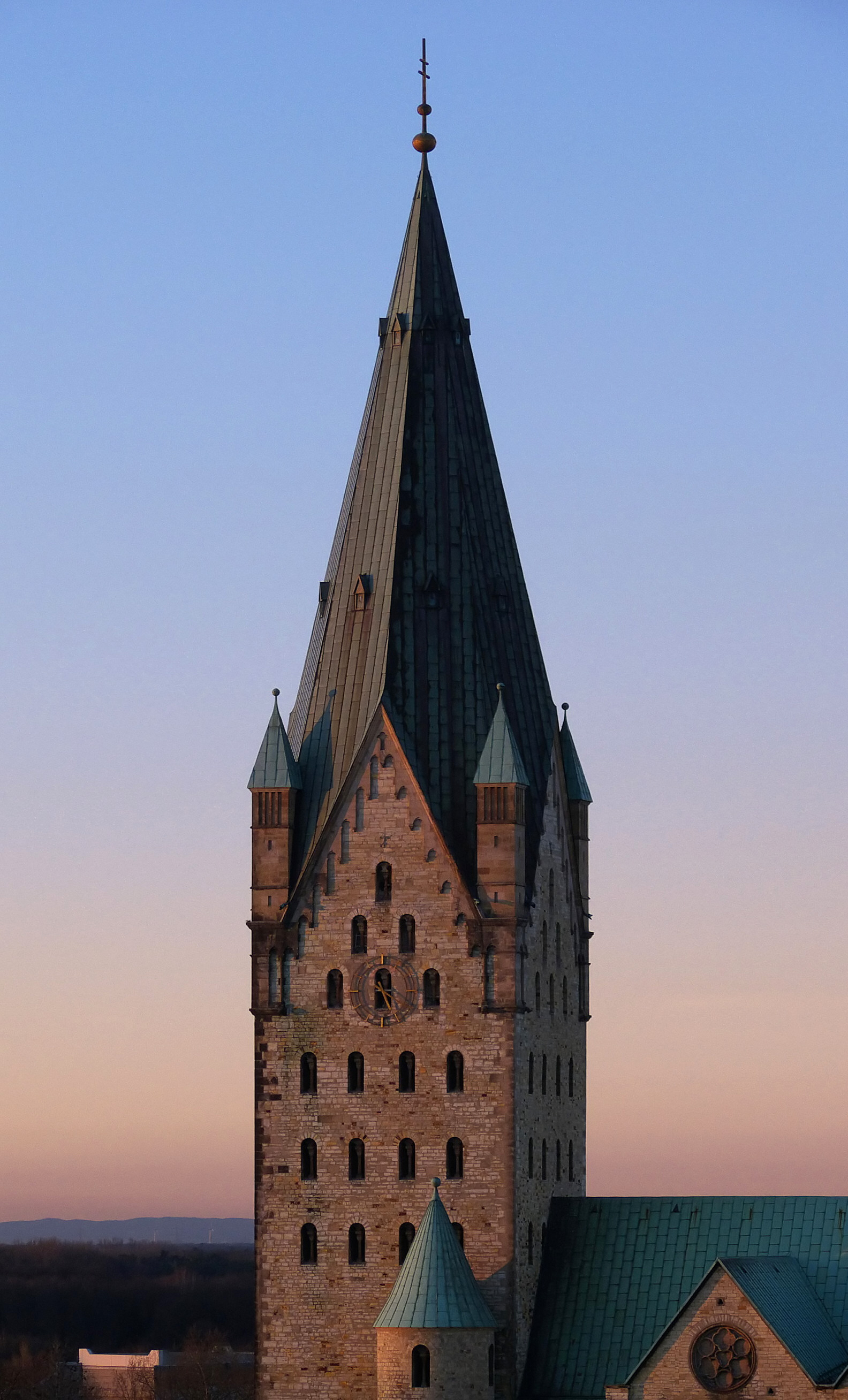
Paderborn Cathedral

==== Modern architecture ====
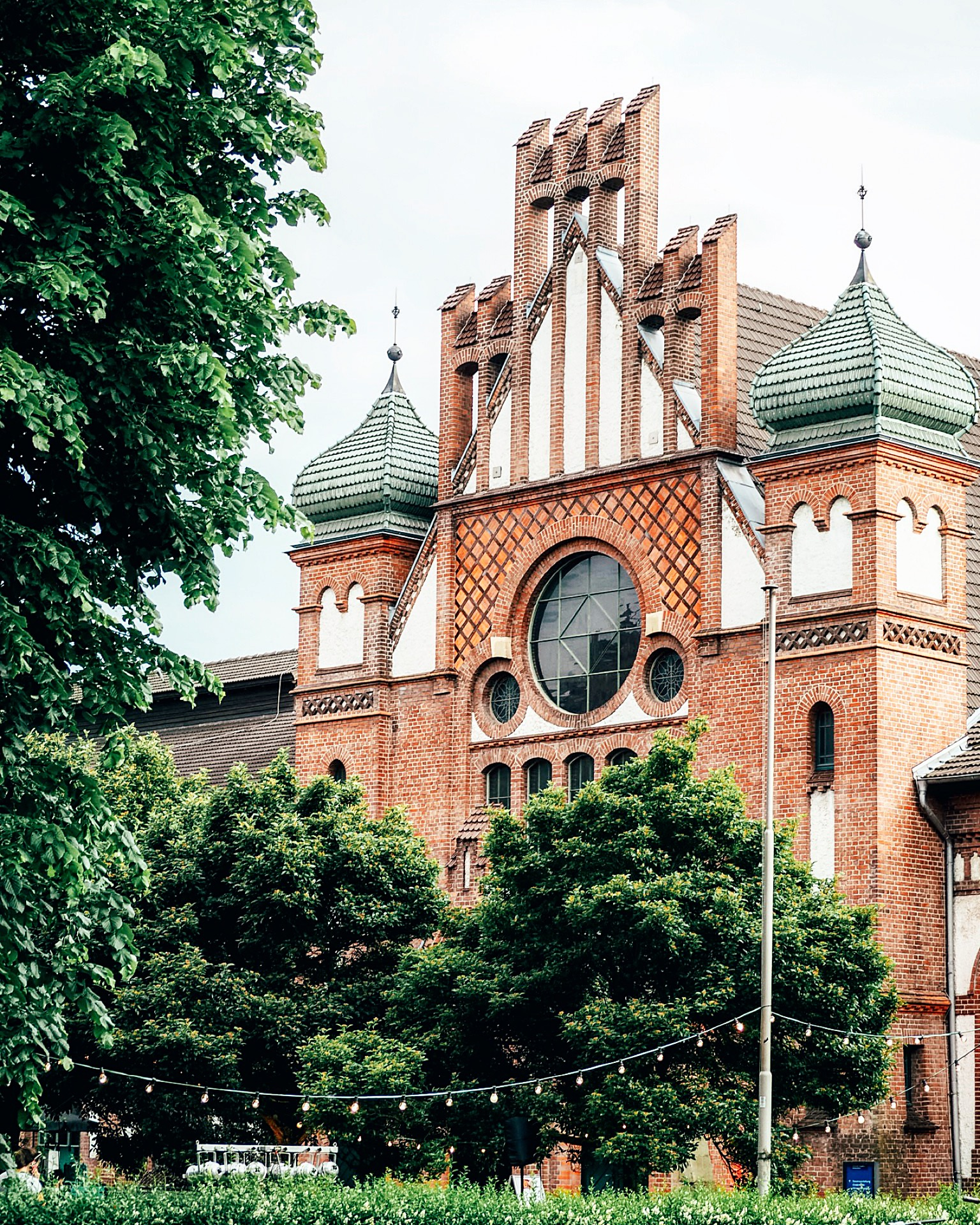
The Zeche Zollern in Dortmund

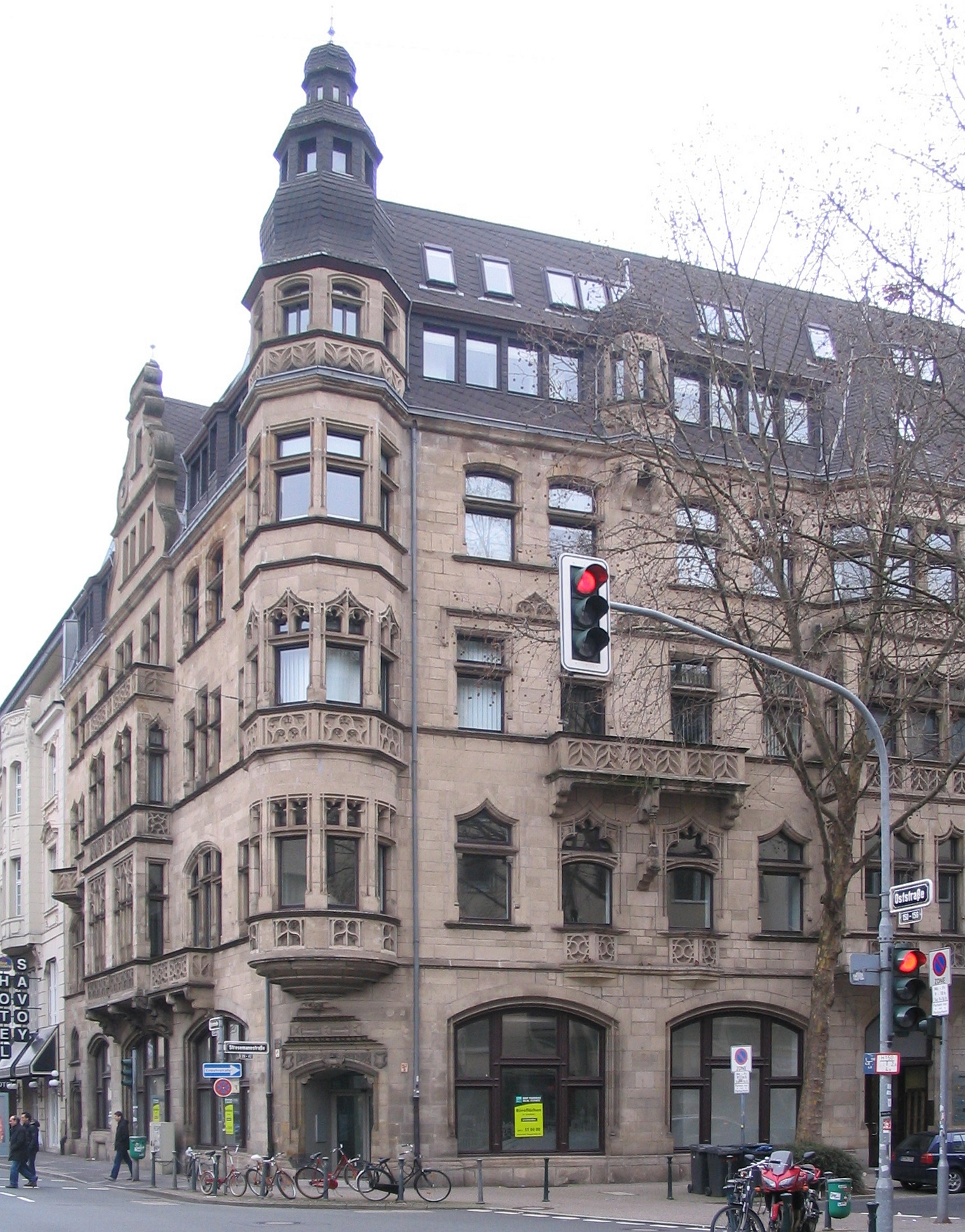
Hotel Römischer Kaiser in Düsseldorf

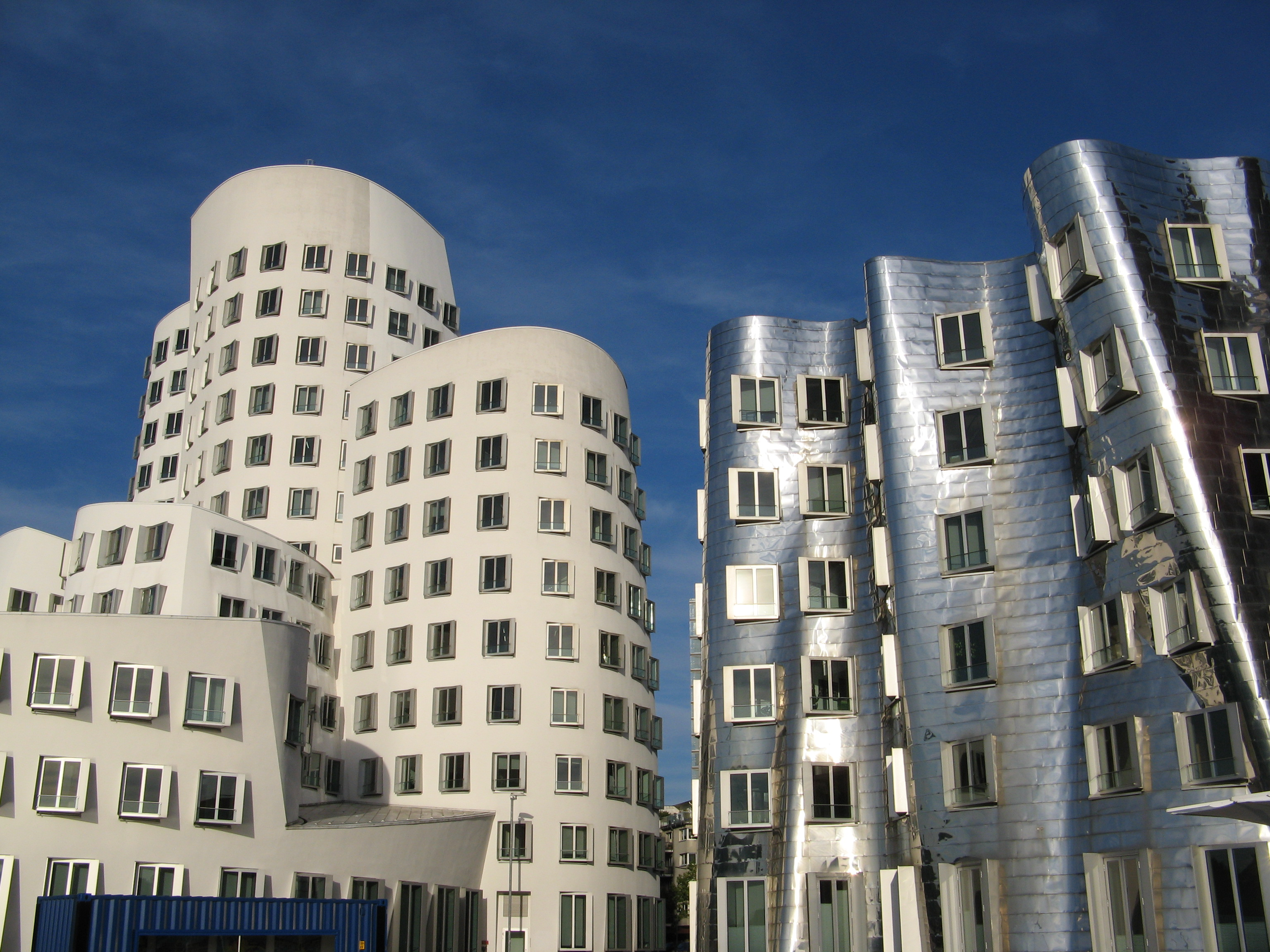
Neuer Zollhof in Düsseldorf

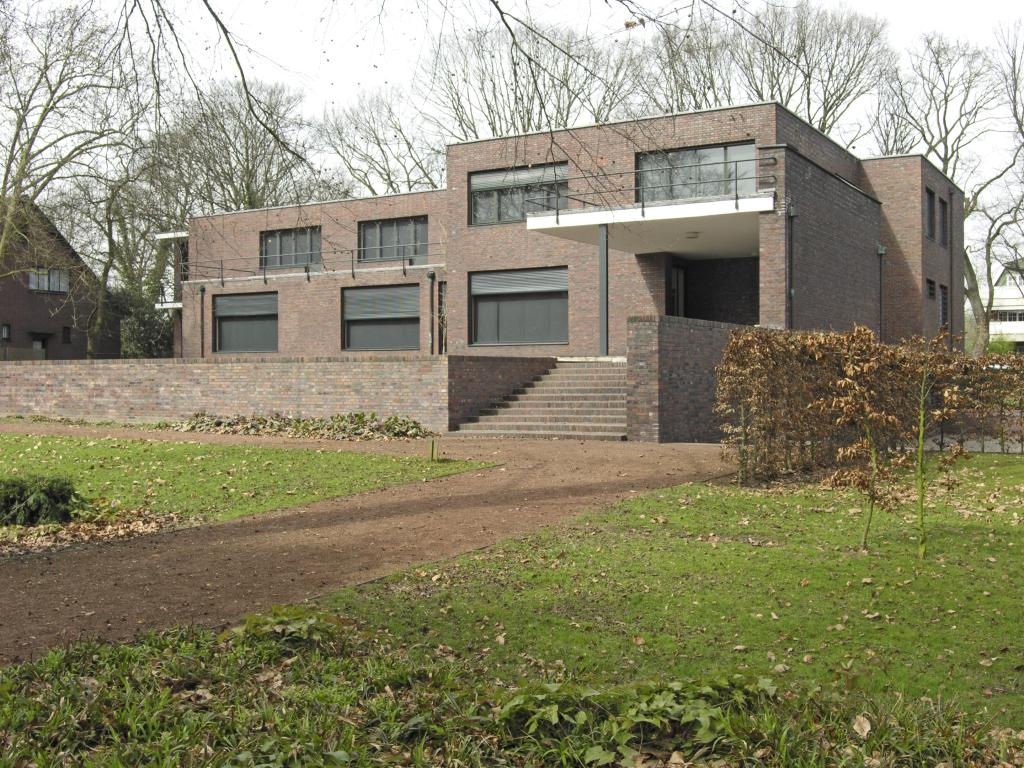
Haus Lange and Haus Esters in Krefeld

The Langen Foundation in Neuss

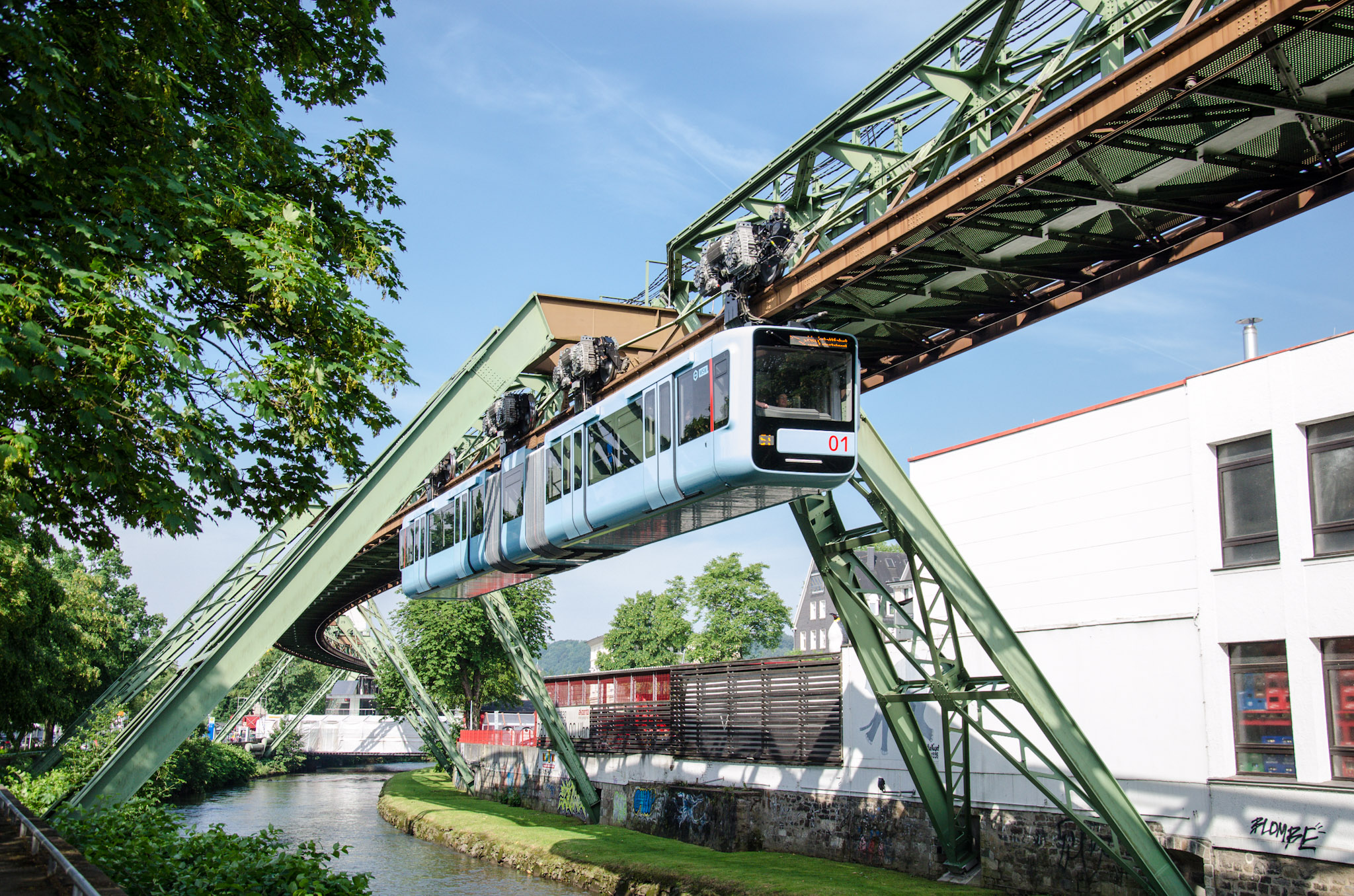
The Schwebebahn in Wuppertal

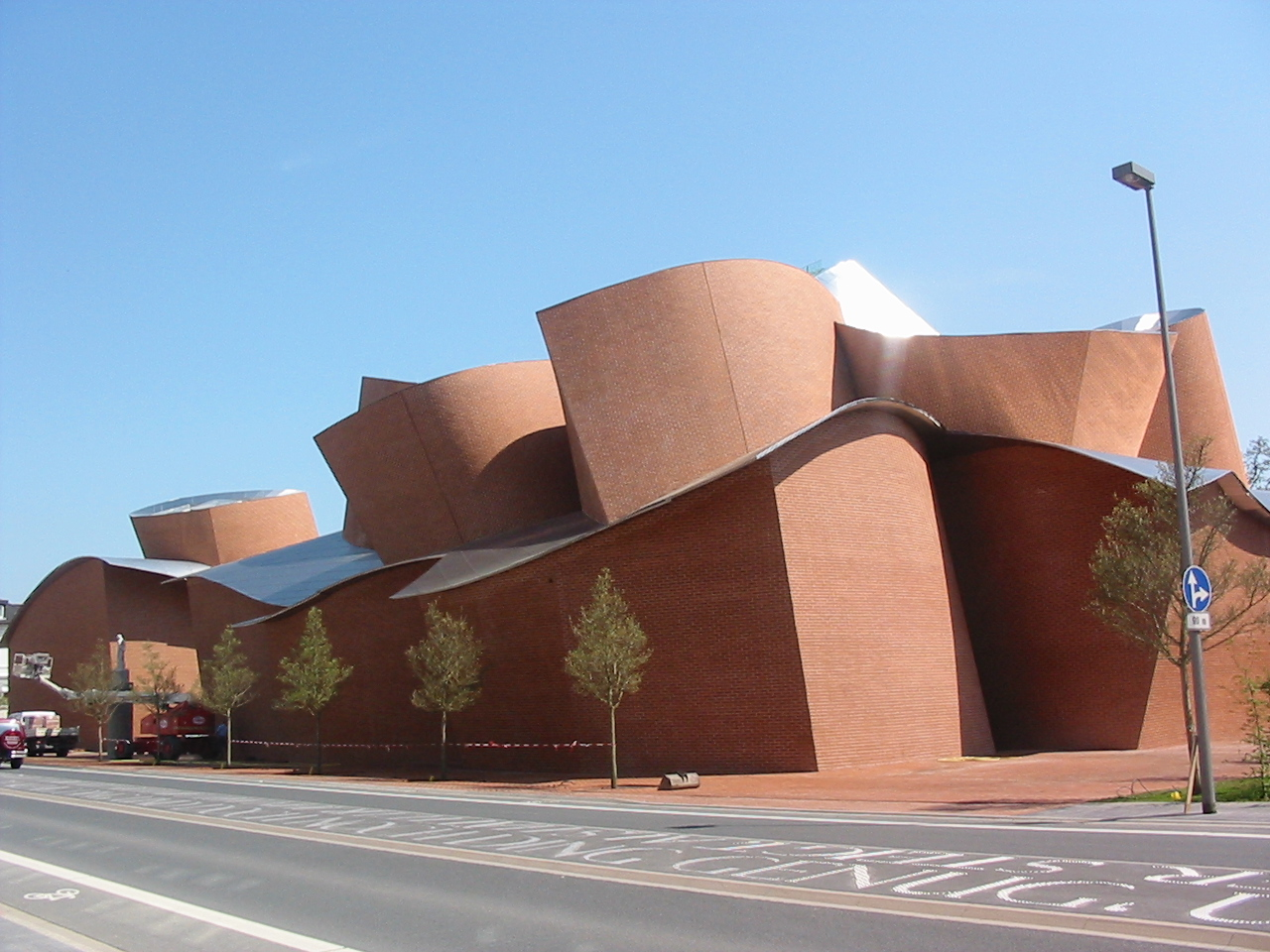
MARTa Herford

==== World Heritage Sites ====
The state has Aachen Cathedral, the Cologne Cathedral, the Zeche Zollverein in Essen, the Augustusburg Palace in Brühl and the Imperial Abbey of Corvey in Höxter which are all World Heritage Sites.

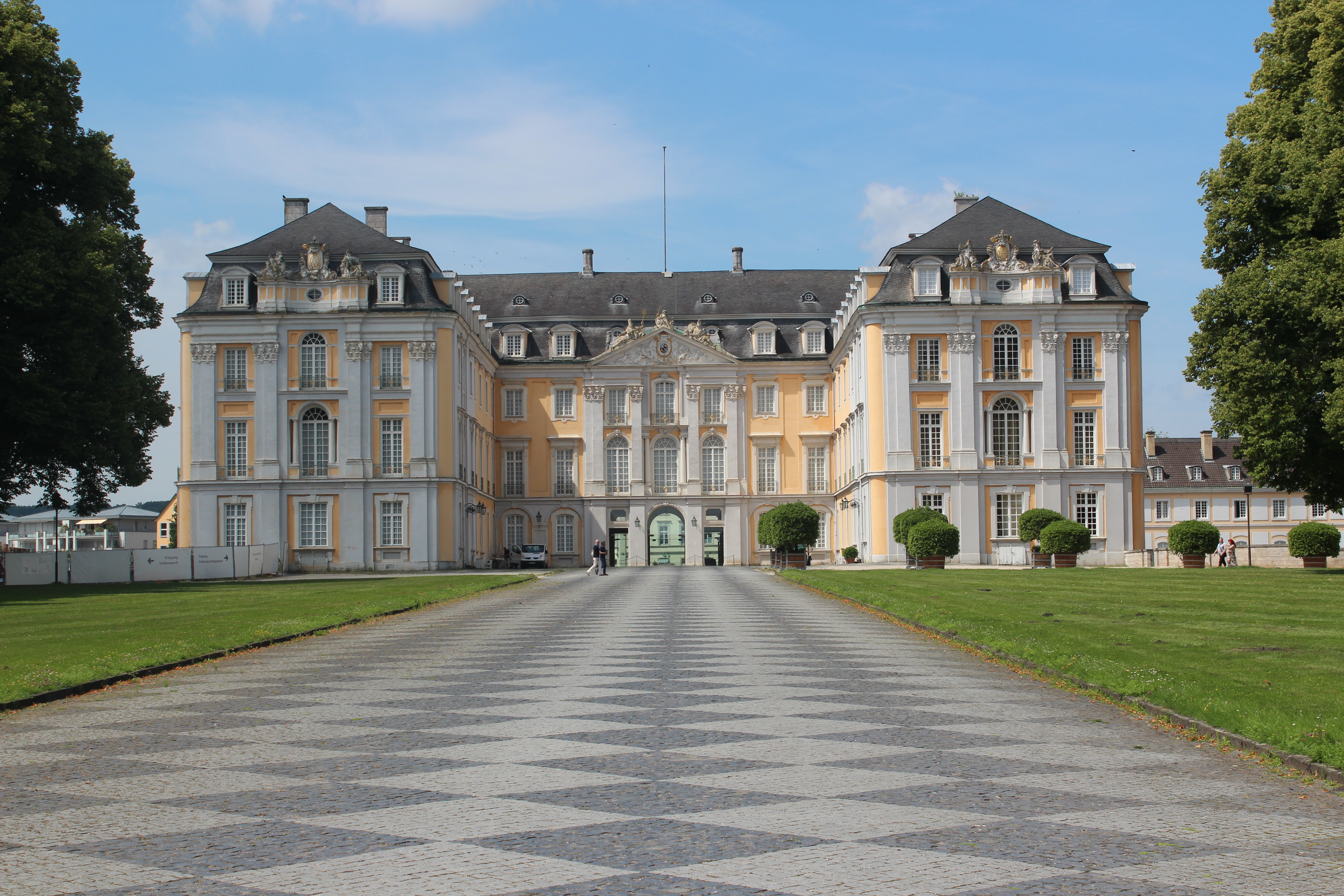
Augustusburg and Falkenlust

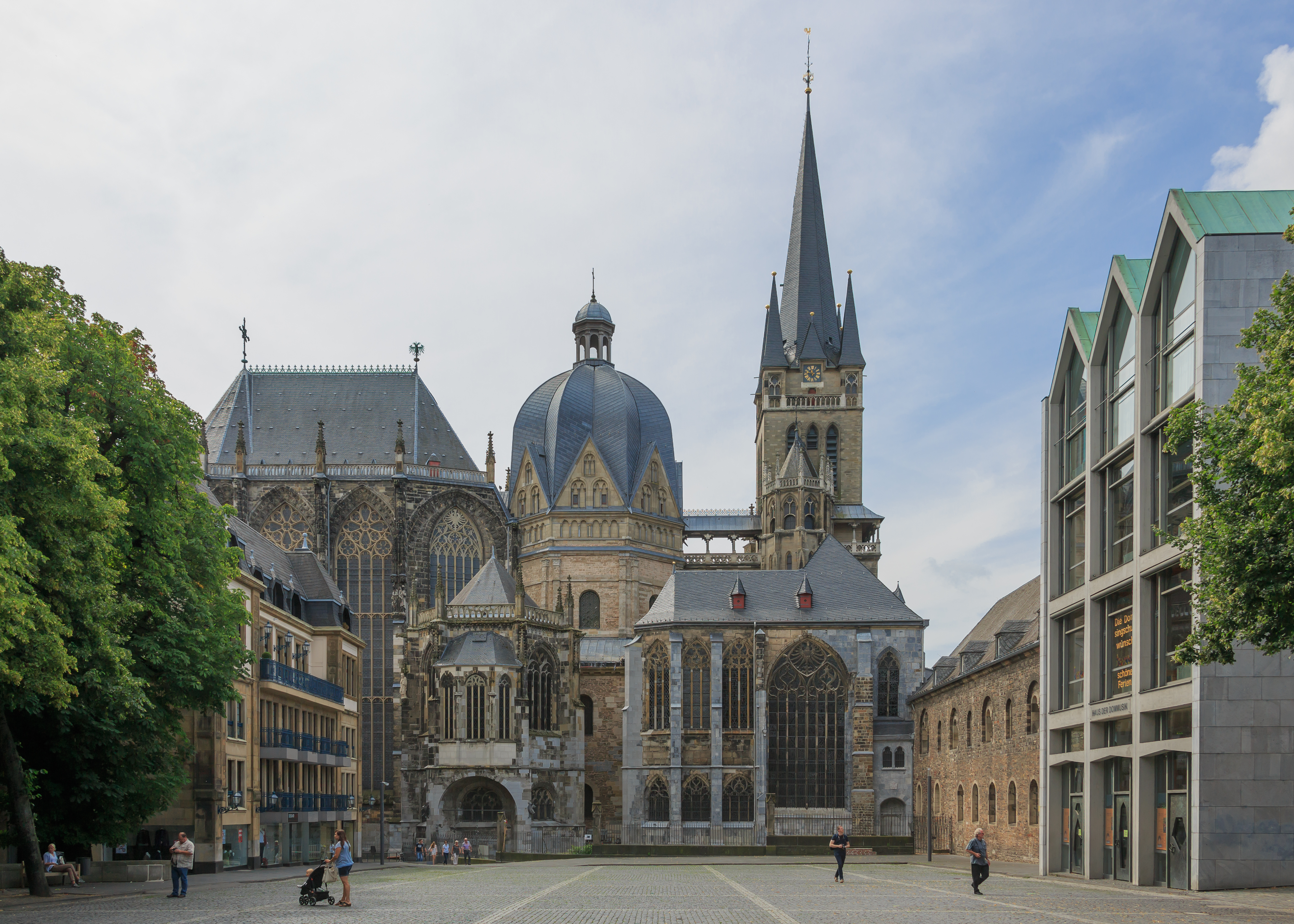
Aachen Cathedral

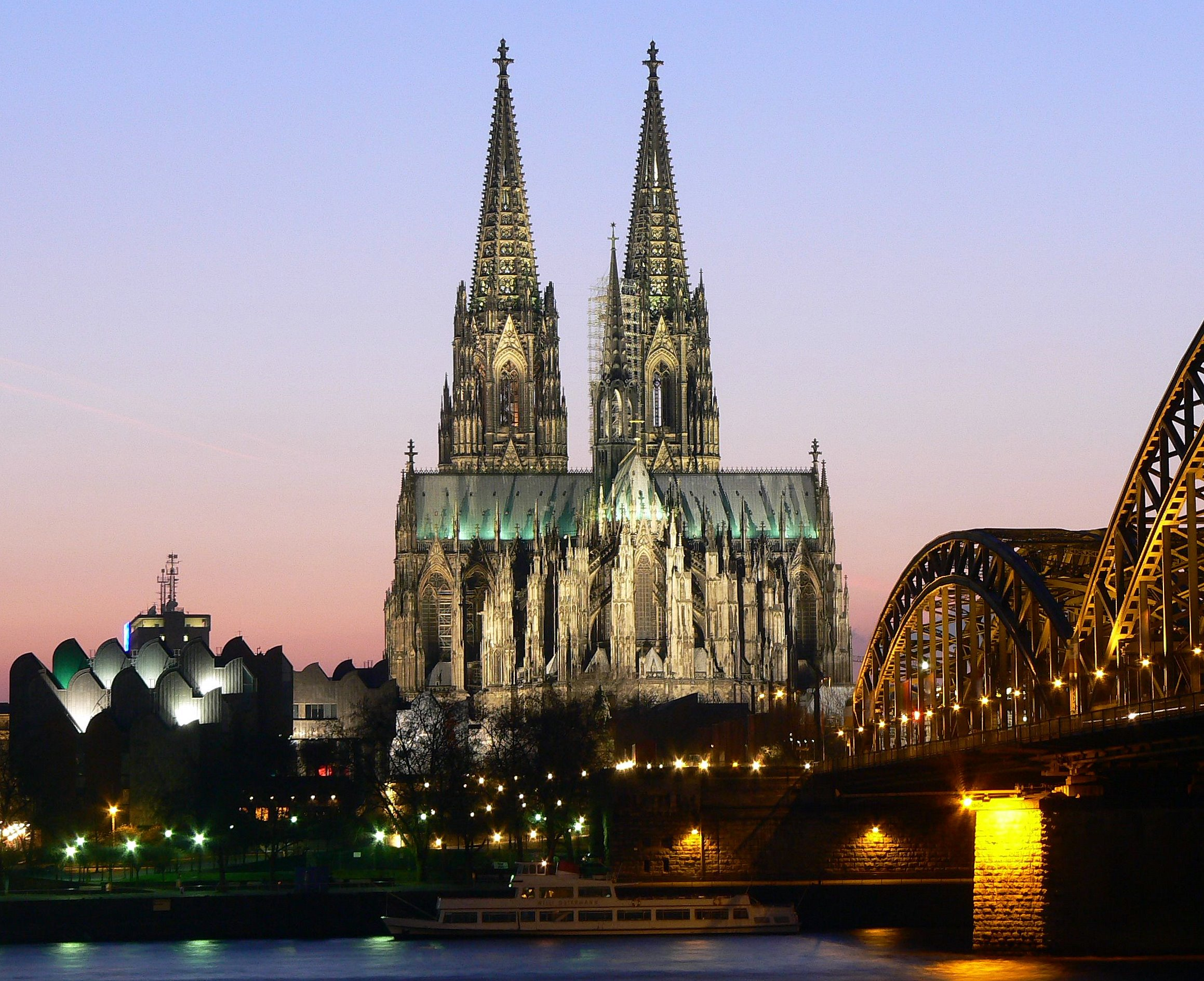
Cologne Cathedral

The Zollverein Coal Mine

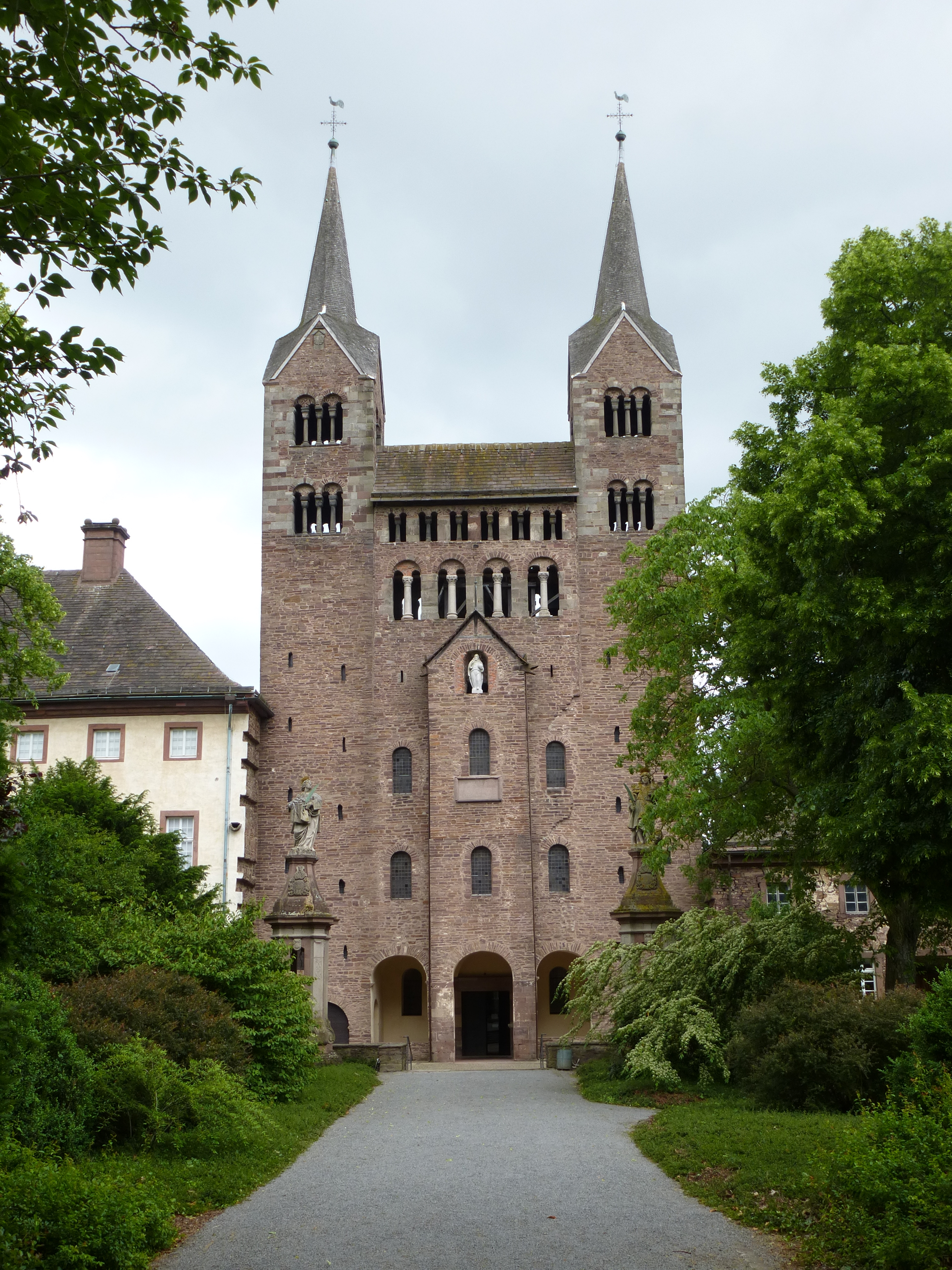
The Imperial Abbey of Corvey

=== Cuisine ===
Food native to North Rhine-Westphalia
Pumpernickel bread one of the most famous German breads. It is made from a dark rye, and has a unique and subtly sweet flavor. It has been baked for centuries and has acquired its popular name when it was used as army rations. It means flatulence and bad spirits.

==== Drinks ====
- Kölsch is a local beer speciality brewed in Cologne.
- Alt is a local beer speciality brewed in Düsseldorf and the Lower Rhine Region.
- Dortmunder Export is a local pale lager beer speciality brewed in Dortmund.

=== Festivals ===
North Rhine-Westphalia hosts film festivals in Cologne, Bonn, Dortmund, Duisburg, Münster, Oberhausen and Lünen.

Other large festivals include Rhenish carnivals, Ruhrtriennale.

Every year Gamescom is hosted in Cologne. It is the largest video game convention in Europe.

=== Music ===
- The composer Ludwig van Beethoven was born in Bonn in 1770.
- A regional anthem is the Lied für NRW (Song for NRW).
- North Rhine-Westphalia is home to many of Germany's best-known heavy metal, speed metal and thrash metal bands: Accept, Angel Dust, Blind Guardian, Doro (formerly of Warlock), Grave Digger, Holy Moses, Kreator, Rage, Scanner and Sodom.
- North Rhine-Westphalia is home to electronic music pioneers Karlheinz Stockhausen and the band Kraftwerk.

== Economy ==
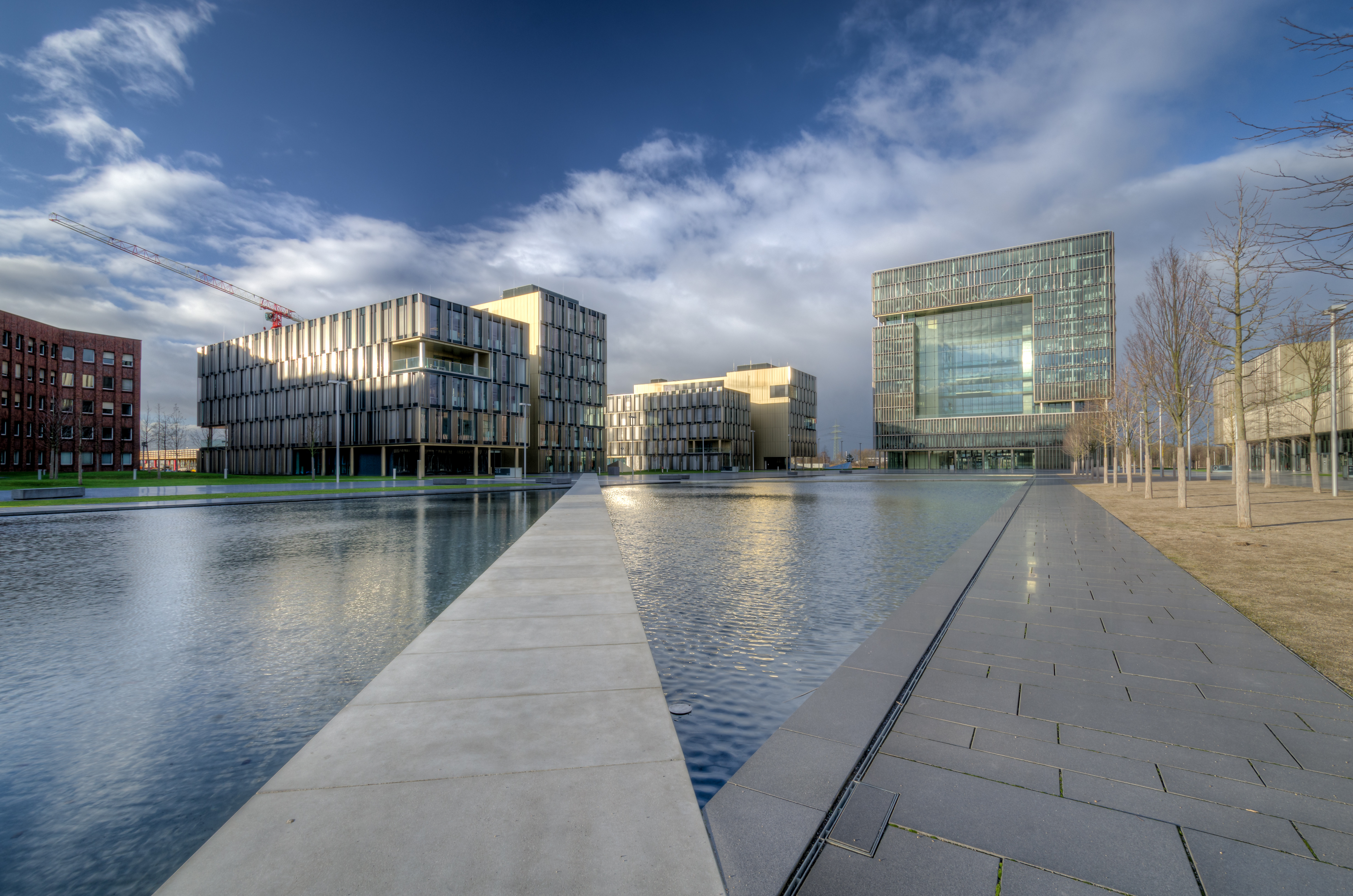
ThyssenKrupp headquarters in Essen

NRW has consistently been Germany's economic powerhouse, with the largest economy among the German states by GDP figures. In 2024, NRW was the first state to exceed a nominal GDP of US$1.0 trillion.

In the post-World War II recovery, the Ruhr region was one of the most important industrial regions in Western Europe, and contributed to the German Wirtschaftswunder. In 1958, a decade long Kohlekrise began: the amount of hard coal mined exceeded demand. One reason was the low oil price. Around 1967, also a steel crisis began. Until then, NRW had been known as Land von Kohle und Stahl (Land of Coal and Steel).

Producing sectors, particularly in mechanical engineering and metal and iron working industry, experienced substantial growth. Despite this structural change and an economic growth which was under national average, the 2024 GDP of €872 billion (1/5 of the total German GDP) made NRW the economically strongest state of Germany by GDP figures, as well as one of the most important economical areas in the world. On a per capita base, however, Rhine-Westphalia remained (as of 2007) one of the weaker among the Western German states. Of Germany’s top 100 corporations, 37 are based in North Rhine-Westphalia.

NRW has attracted companies from both Germany and abroad. In 2009, NRW had the most foreign direct investments (FDI) anywhere in Germany.

At the end of 2018, the last coal mine in NRW closed (de:Bergwerk Prosper-Haniel). There have been many changes in NRW's economy. I.e., employment in the creative industries has grown. Industrial heritage sites are now workplaces for designers, artists and the advertising industry. The Ruhr region has – since the 1960s – undergone a significant structural change away from coal mining and steel industry. Many rural parts of Eastern Westphalia, Bergisches Land and the Lower Rhine ground their economy on "Hidden Champions" in various sectors.

As of June 2014, the unemployment rate was 8.2%, second highest among all western German states. In October 2018 the unemployment rate stood at 6.4%, higher than the national average.

Year	2000	2001	2002	2003	2004	2005	2006	2007	2008	2009	2010	2011	2012	2013	2014	2015	2016	2017	2018
Unemployment rate in %	9.2	8.8	9.2	10.0	10.2	12.0	11.4	9.5	8.5	8.9	8.7	8.1	8.1	8.3	8.2	8.0	7.7	7.4	6.8

== Transport ==
With its central location in the most important European economic area, high population density, strong urbanization and numerous business locations, North Rhine-Westphalia has one of the densest transport networks in the world.

=== Regional rail network ===
Rail transport infrastructure map of North Rhine-Westphalia

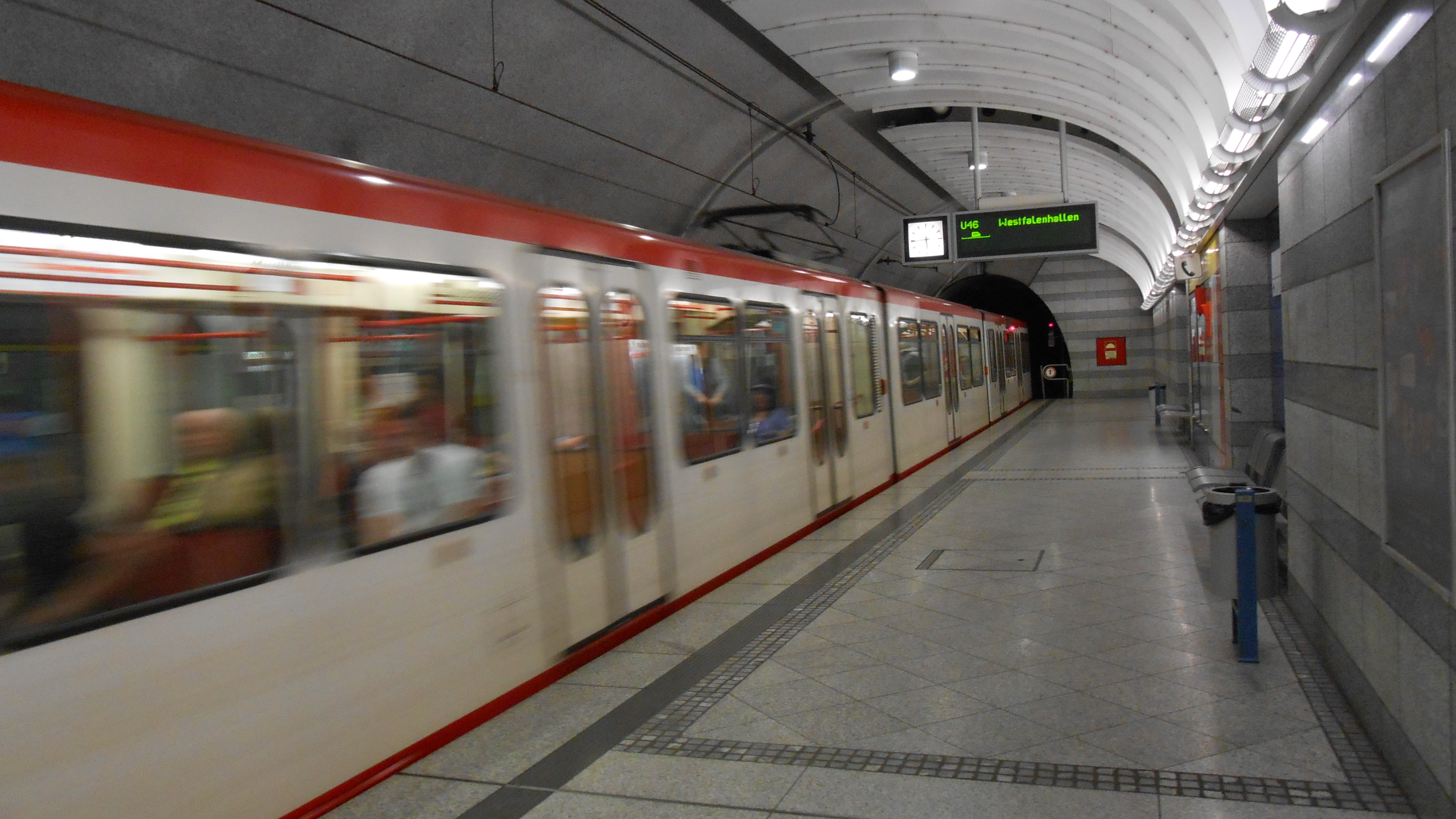
Stadtbahn in Dortmund

The regional rail network is organised around the big cities on the Rhine and Ruhr such as Cologne, Düsseldorf and Dortmund. The public transport companies in the Ruhr area and Düsseldorf are run under the umbrella of the Verkehrsverbund Rhein-Ruhr, which provides a uniform ticket system valid for the area. The region of Cologne and Bonn is run under the Verkehrsverbund Rhein-Sieg. There is also a ticketing system called NRW-Tarif which offers tickets between all the regions of North Rhine-Westphalia. The state is well-integrated into the national rail system, the Deutsche Bahn, for both passenger and goods services, each city in the region has at least one or more train stations. The bigger central stations have frequent direct connections to most bigger German cities and European cities such as Amsterdam, Brussels, Paris and Basel. Some direct trains run to Vienna and Zürich.

The Rhein-Ruhr area also contains some of the longest tram system in the world, with tram and Stadtbahn services from Witten to Krefeld in the VRR zone and Cologne to Bad Honnef and Siegburg via Bonn within the VRS zone. Besides the local public transportation there is an interconnected commuter rail network, with the Rhine-Ruhr S-Bahn network serving the Ruhr area as well as Düsseldorf and the S-Bahn Köln serving the area around Cologne.

As of 2012, the VRR network alone consists of 978 lines, of which there are:

- in regional rail transit
  - 11 S-Bahn lines (see: Rhine-Ruhr S-Bahn)
  - 15 RegionalExpress lines (see: List of regional railway lines in North Rhine-Westphalia)
  - 24 RegionalBahn lines (see: List of regional railway lines in North Rhine-Westphalia)
- in local rail transit
  - 19 Stadtbahn light rail lines (see: Rhine-Ruhr Stadtbahn)
  - 45 tram (Straßenbahn) lines
  - 1 Schwebebahn line (in Wuppertal)
  - 2 H-Bahn peoplemover systems made up of three lines (two H-Bahn lines in Dortmund, and the Düsseldorf SkyTrain at Düsseldorf airport)
- in bus transit
  - 906 bus lines, including
    - 33 express bus lines (Schnellbus, SB)
    - 18 semi-fast bus lines (CityExpress, CE)
  - 6 trolleybus lines (in Solingen)
- 15,300 km of route network (bus, light rail, and train)
- 11,500 transit stops

In 2022 the VRS and AVV area contains

- in regional rail transit
  - 7 S-Bahn lines (with 4 being part of the Rhein-Ruhr S-Bahn)
  - 11 RegionalExpress lines (6 conntected to VRR)
  - 18 RegionalBahn services
- in local rail transit
  - 16 Stadtbahn lines (see: Cologne Stadtbahn and Bonn Stadtbahn)
  - 3 streetcar (Straßenbahn) lines within the city of Bonn

=== Road ===
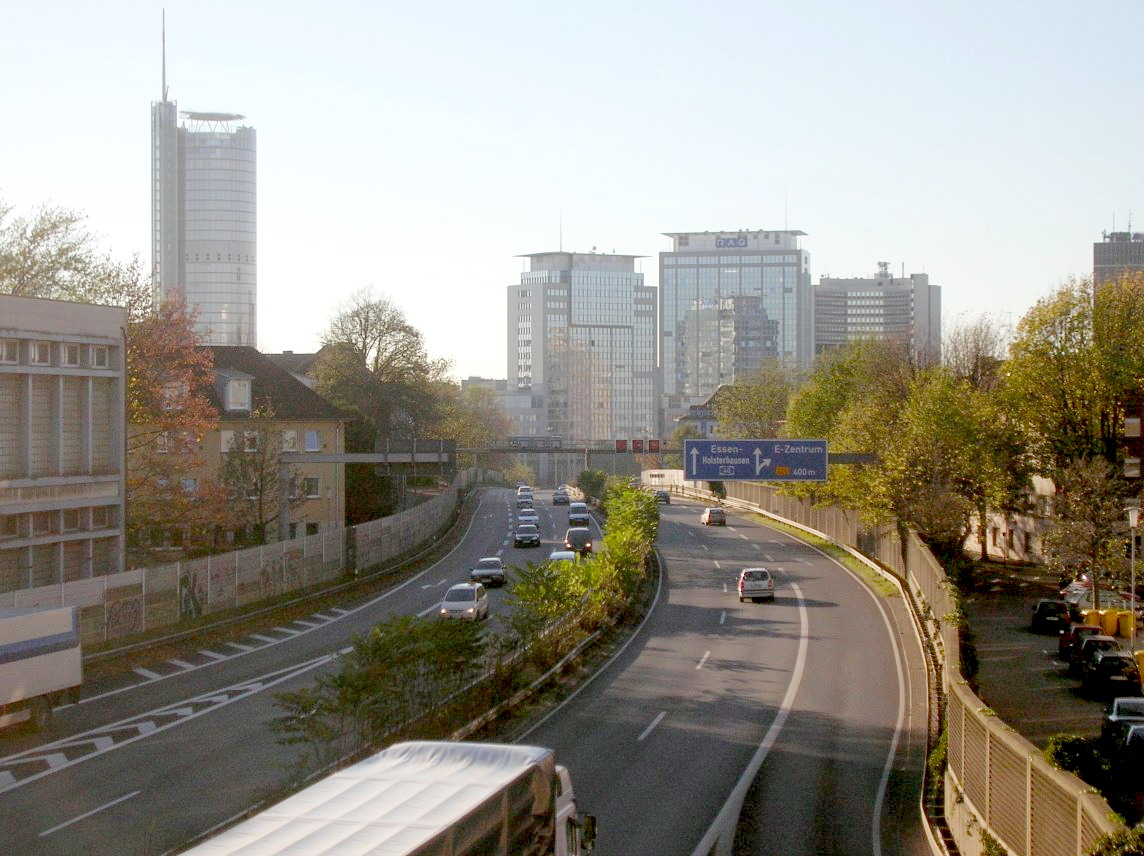
Autobahn A40 in Essen

North Rhine-Westphalia has the densest network of Autobahns in Germany and similar Schnellstraßen (expressways). The Autobahn network is built in a grid network, with six east–west (A2, A4, A40, A42, A44, A46) and eight north–south (A1, A3, A43, A45, A52, A57, A59, A61) routes. The A1, A2, A3, A4 and A61 are mostly used by through traffic, while the other autobahns have a more regional function.

Both the A44 and the A52 have several missing links, in various stages of planning. Some missing sections are currently in construction or planned to be constructed in the near future.

Additional expressways serve as bypasses and local routes, especially around Dortmund and Bochum. Due to the density of the autobahns and expressways, Bundesstraßen are less important for intercity traffic. The first Autobahns in the Region opened during the mid-1930s. Due to the density of the network, and the number of alternative routes, traffic volumes are generally lower than other major metropolitan areas in Europe. Traffic congestion is an everyday occurrence, but far less so than in the Randstad in the Netherlands, another polycentric urban area. Most important Autobahns have six lanes.

=== Airports ===
The region benefits from the presence of several airport infrastructure. The main airport is Düsseldorf Airport, world class, which hosted 25.5 million passengers in 2019 and offers flights to various international destinations. Düsseldorf is the fourth-largest airport in Germany after Frankfurt, Munich and Berlin and serves as a hub for Eurowings and as focus city for several more airlines. The airport has three passenger terminals and two runways and can handle wide-body aircraft up to the Airbus A380.

The second airport is Cologne Bonn Airport serving Germany's fourth-largest city Cologne, and also serves Bonn, former capital of West Germany. With around 10 million passengers passing through it in 2023, it is the sixth-largest passenger airport in Germany and the third-largest in terms of cargo operations. It is also a hub for Eurowings, but also for some cargo airlines. By traffic units, which combines cargo and passengers, the airport is in fifth position in Germany. As of March 2015, Cologne Bonn Airport had services to 115 passenger destinations in 35 countries. It is named after Konrad Adenauer, a Cologne native and the first post-war Chancellor of West Germany.

Third airport in the region, Dortmund Airport is a minor international airport located 10 km (6.2 mi) east of Dortmund. It serves the eastern Rhine-Ruhr area, the largest urban agglomeration in Germany, and is mainly used for low-cost and leisure charter flights. In 2019 the airport served 2,719,563 passengers.

There are three more minor airports within the state: Münster Osnabrück Airport, Airport Weeze and Paderborn Lippstadt Airport.

=== Waterways ===
The Rhine flows through North Rhine-Westphalia. Its banks are usually heavily populated and industrialized, in particular the agglomerations Cologne, Düsseldorf and Ruhr area. Here the Rhine flows through the largest conurbation in Germany, the Rhine-Ruhr region. Duisburg Inner Harbour (Duisport) and Dortmund Port are large industrial inland ports and serve as hubs along the Rhine and the German inland water transport system. The country is crossed by many canals like Rhine–Herne Canal (RHK), der Wesel-Datteln-Kanal (WDK), der Datteln-Hamm-Kanal (DHK) and Dortmund-Ems-Kanal (DEK) an important role for inland navigation.

== Education ==
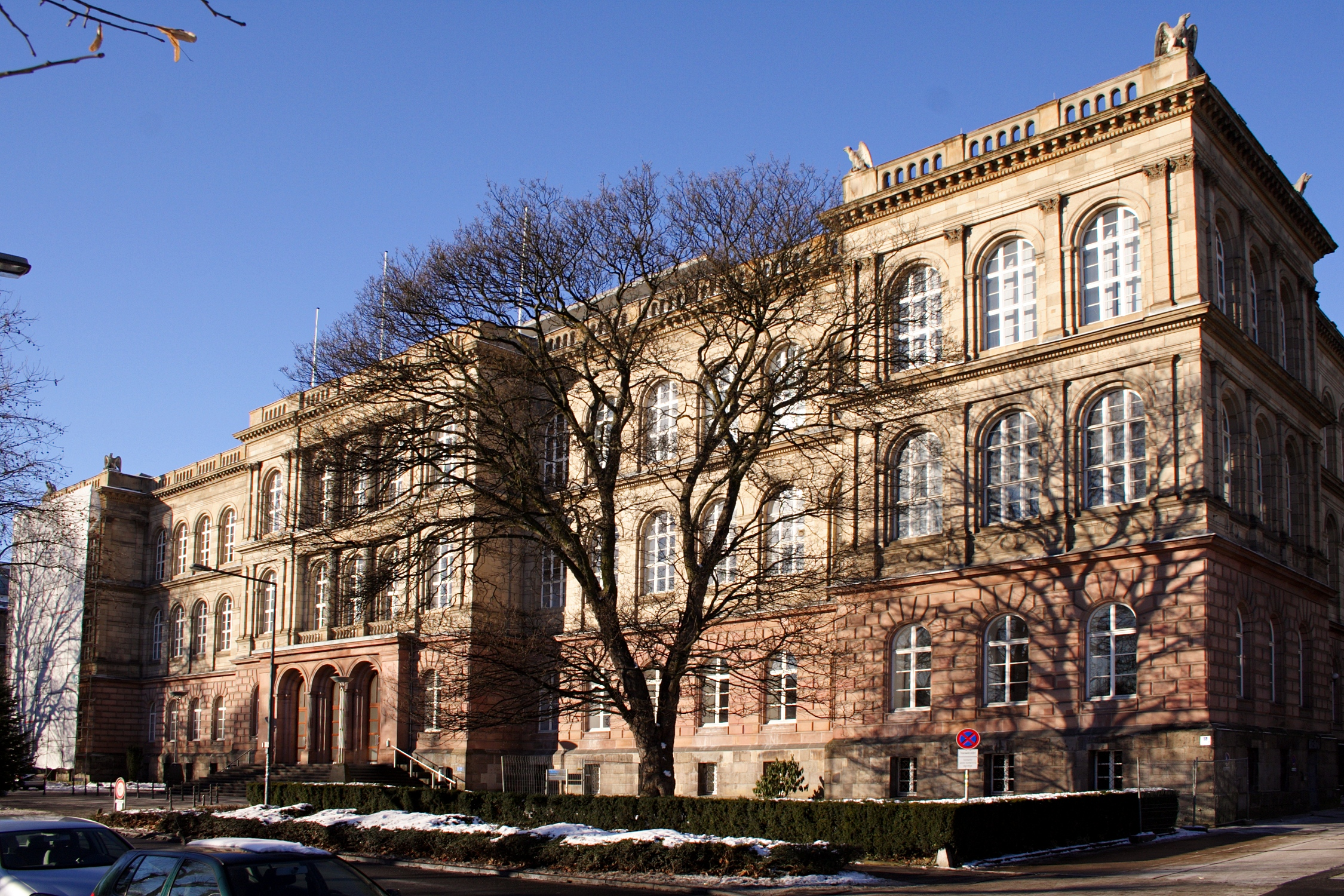
RWTH Aachen

RWTH Aachen is one of Germany's leading universities of technology and was chosen by DFG as one of the German Universities of Excellence in 2007, 2012 and again in 2019. North Rhine-Westphalia is home to 14 universities and over 50 partly postgraduate colleges, with a total of over 742,000 students. Largest and oldest university is the University of Cologne (Universität zu Köln), founded in 1388 AD, since 2012 also one of Germany's eleven Universities of Excellence. University of Duisburg-Essen (Universität Duisburg-Essen), is also well known and is one of the largest universities in Germany.

== Sports ==
=== Football ===
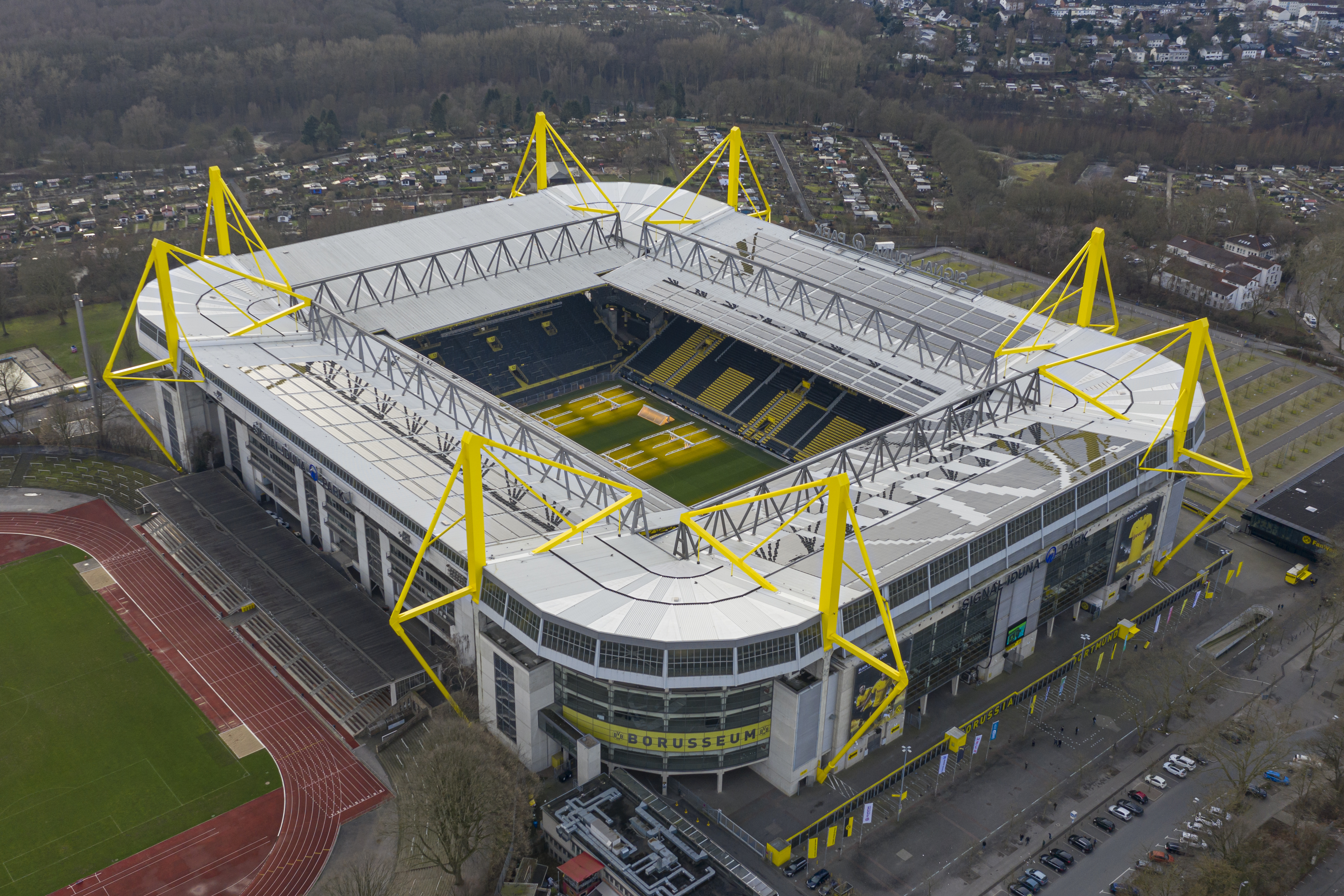
Signal Iduna Park, the stadium of Bundesliga club Borussia Dortmund, is the largest stadium in Germany.

NRW is home to several football clubs of the Bundesliga including Bayer 04 Leverkusen, Borussia Dortmund, Borussia Mönchengladbach, 1. FC Köln and FC Schalke 04 and the 2. Bundesliga including Fortuna Düsseldorf, SC Paderborn 07 and VfL Bochum and the 3. Liga including Arminia Bielefeld, MSV Duisburg, Rot-Weiß Essen, Preußen Münster, Rot-Weiß Oberhausen, FC Viktoria Köln and SC Verl. Since the formal establishment of the German Bundesliga in 1963, Borussia Dortmund and Borussia Mönchengladbach have been the most successful teams in the state, with both winning five titles. 1. FC Köln won two titles, including the first in 1963. Before the league's establishment, North Rhine-Westfalian teams competed for the title of Deutscher Fußballmeister (German Football Champion). Here, FC Schalke 04 brought home seven titles, while Dortmund and Köln won an additional three and one title(s), respectively. Fortuna Düsseldorf and Rot-Weiß Essen have each been German Champion once. North Rhine-Westphalia has been a very successful footballing state having a combined total of 25 championships, fewer only than Bavaria.

=== Basketball ===
The state is also home to several professional basketball teams that currently either compete in the Basketball Bundesliga or ProA or have competed there in the past. These teams include Telekom Baskets Bonn, Bayer Giants Leverkusen, Paderborn Baskets, Uni Baskets Münster, VfL SparkassenStars Bochum, Phoenix Hagen and Alemannia Aachen.

=== Ice hockey ===
North Rhine-Westphalia is home to current and former DEL teams Düsseldorfer EG, Kölner Haie, Krefeld Pinguine, and Iserlohn Roosters.

== See also ==
- Beckrath
- Kunstsammlung Nordrhein-Westfalen
- Kunststiftung NRW
- NRW Forum
- Outline of Germany
- List of rivers of North Rhine-Westphalia
- List of lakes in North Rhine-Westphalia
