= Beckrath =

Coordinates: 51°07′N 6°23′E

Beckrath is a small rural village in North Rhine-Westphalia, Germany, 507 kilometres (315 mi) west of Berlin and 9.9 kilometres (6.2 mi) south of Mönchengladbach.

== History and religion ==
The village of Beckrath was one of the few Reformed villages in the region. In addition, in 1918 the village had 41 Jewish residents who belonged to the Wickrathberg synagogue community.

== Clubs ==
- Beckrath Monument Preservation and Local History Association, founded in 1921
- Beckrath Gymnastics Club e. V. 1898
- Volunteer fire department Beckrath, founded in 1880
- Men's Choir „Einigkeit“ Beckrath, founded in 1879
- Women's Aid Beckrath, founded in 1925

== People of note ==
- Wilhelm Wickop (1824–1908), trade school teacher and architect of historicism
