= Limburg-Stirum =

German noble family

- Mediatized German family
- Coat of Arms of Limburg-Stirum
- Parent house: Ezzonids → Berg
- Country: Holy Roman Empire
- Founded: 11th century as Counts of Berg
- Founder: Adolf I, Count of Berg
- Current head: Franz von Limburg Stirum
- Titles: Imperial Count
- Estates: County of Berg, Altena, Isenberg, County of Limburg, Gemen, Styrum, Wisch, Bronkhorst and Borculo, Oberstein, etc.

The House of Limburg-Stirum (or Limburg-Styrum), which adopted its name in the 12th century from the immediate county of Limburg an der Lenne in what is now Germany, is one of the oldest families in Europe. It is the eldest and only surviving branch of the House of Berg, which was among the most powerful dynasties in the region of the lower Rhine during the Middle Ages. Some historians link them to an even older dynasty, the Ezzonids, going back to the 9th century.

The Limburg-Stirum were imperial counts within the Holy Roman Empire, until they were mediatised in 1806 by the Confederation of the Rhine. Although undisputedly a mediatised comital family, having enjoyed a dynastic status for over 600 years until the collapse of the Empire, they were omitted from the Almanach de Gotha because the branches of the family possessing mediatised lands were extinct by the time (1815) that the Congress of Vienna established the German Confederation's obligation to recognise their dynastic status.

Since the 9th century, the family counted five Counts Palatine of Lotharingia, several Dukes of Westphalia, Bavaria, Carinthia and Swabia, seven Archbishops of Cologne, one Prince-Bishop of Speyer, more than ten bishops in the Holy Roman Empire, and at least two saints of the Catholic Church (Saint Richenza, celebrated on 21 March, and Saint Engelbert of Cologne, celebrated on 7 November).

The territorial authority of the family, counts of Berg since 1077, counts of Altena and Isenberg, then counts of Limburg since 1246, was significantly reduced following the opposition of Frederick II, Count of Isenberg to the aggression of his cousin, the Archbishop of Cologne, Engelbert II of Berg, leading to the murder of the latter. A cadet branch, the Counts van den Marck, later rose in importance as dukes of Cleves, Jülich and Berg, dukes of Nevers and Bouillon, counts of Schleiden, etc.

Today's members are mostly found in Belgium and the Netherlands.

== History ==
=== The Ezzonian dynasty ===
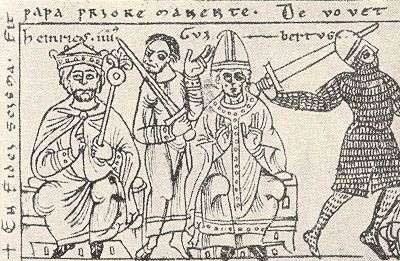
the crowning of Emperor Henry IV (left) by Clement III (center-right). Between them is Count Palatine Hermann II. Chronicle of Otto von Freising, Codex Jenensis Bose q.6 (1157).

The Ezzonen appear in the chronicles with Erenfried I (866–904), count of the Bliesgau, Keldachgau and Bonngau (maybe also count of Charmois). Probably he had Carolingian ancestors, although some historians prefer to link him to former Thuringian kings.

The Ezzonian dynasty (named after Count Palatine Ezzo) were the Counts Palatine of Lotharingia during the 10th and 11th centuries. They were important in governance of the region of the Middle and Lower Rhine. In spite of their military accomplishments in favour of the German emperors, the Ezzonians did not succeed in building a territorial entity in Lotharingia. During a limited period, they were, however, assigned the duchies of Swabia, Bavaria and Carinthia.

Famous members of the dynasty are:

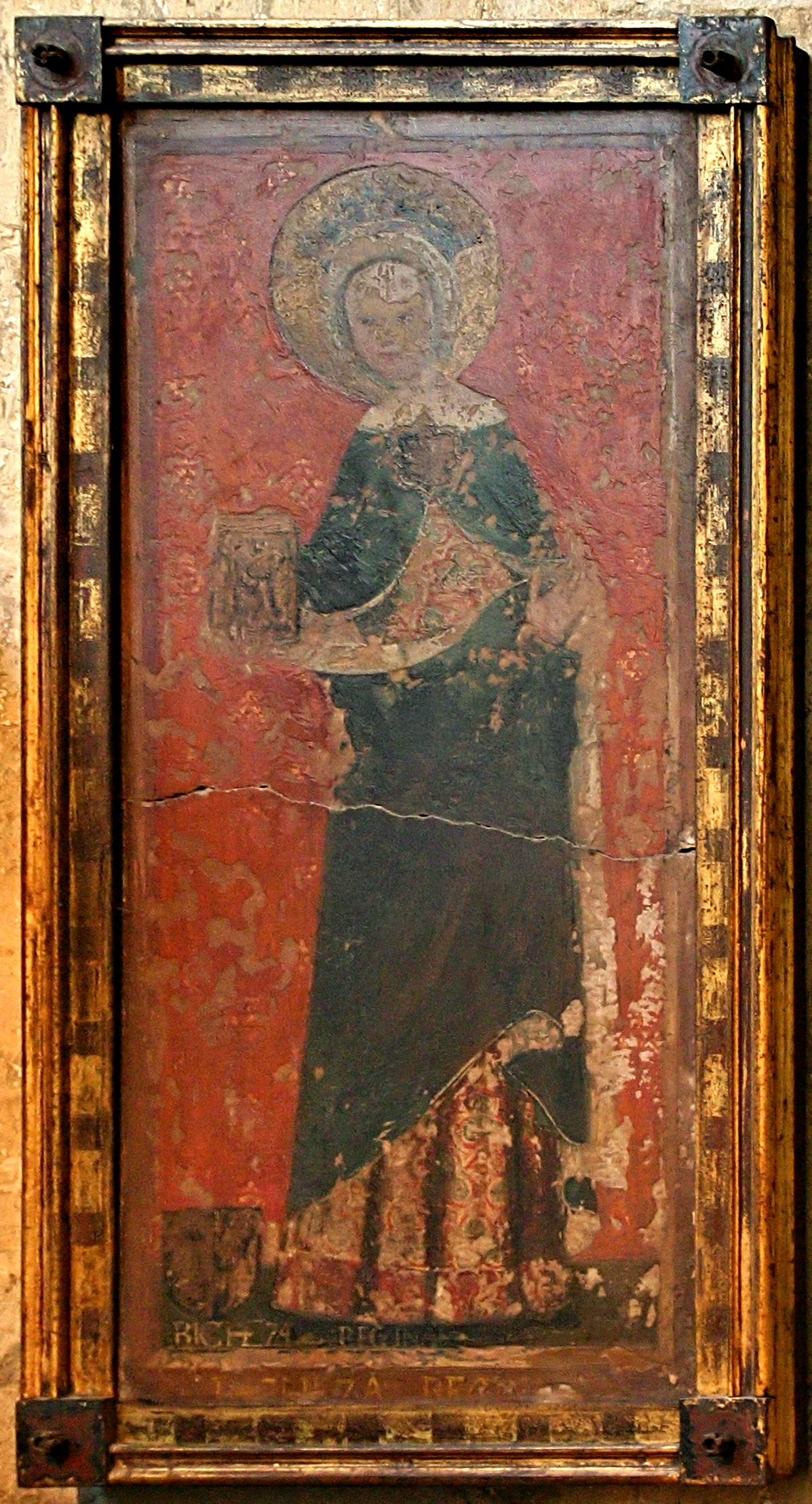
Richeza of Lotharingia, Queen of Poland

- Ezzo, Count Palatine of Lotharingia (1015–1034). According to the Brauweiler chronicle, he failed to succeed in the monarchy after the death of emperor Otto III (983–1002) in a rivalry with duke Heinrich II of Bavaria (1002–1024). The succession war between Ezzo and Heinrich II continued for over ten years. Both parties came to an agreement after a battle in Odernheim (1011). Kaiserswerth, Duisburg and the surrounding imperial territories were granted as a fief to Ezzo for renouncing the throne (after 1016). When the German crown passed from the Ottonian to the Salian (1024), the Ezzonen remained neutral, apparently after an agreement between Ezzo and Konrad II (1024–1039). The Annales Hildesheimenses record that "Hezo Palatinus comes" died after catching pox from his concubine.
- Otto I, Count Palatine of Lotharingia (1035–1045) and Duke of Swabia (1045–1047). After a successful campaign against the rebelling count of Flanders (margrave of Valenciennes and Ename), Otto received the duchy of Swabia in 1045 in exchange for the cities of Kaiserswerth and Duisburg, which went back to the crown. At the same time, the palatinate of Lotharingia was passed to his nephew.
- Heinrich I Furiosus, Count Palatine of Lotharingia from 1045 until 1060. He was elected as successor for the German kingdom during Emperor Heinrich III's illness. Hearing that his wife Mathilde (daughter of Duke Gozelo of Lotharingia, and sister of pope Stephen IX) had a love-affair with one of his relatives, he killed her with an axe. Heinrich then was enclosed into the abbey of Echternach, where he died in 1061.
- Richeza of Lotharingia, Queen of Poland. Her marriage to Mieszko II was decided as part of peace an agreement between King Bolesław I the Brave and Emperor Otto III. After she returned to Germany after the deposition of her husband in 1031, she became later a nun and today is revered as Blessed Richeza of Lotharingia, celebrated on 21 March.
- Conrad I, Duke of Bavaria, heir of Henry III, Holy Roman Emperor. He was deprived of the dukedom in 1053 when the Emperor installed his son as Duke. He died in exile after an attempt to assassinate the Emperor and seize the throne.
- Conrad III, was installed as Duke of Carinthia in 1057. The Annales of Berthold record the death in 1061 of Chounradus... Carantanis ducis.
- Hermann I, Archbishop of Cologne, Chancellor of King Zwentibold of Lotharingia.
- Hermann II, Archbishop of Cologne. He became Archchancellor of Italy and protector of Brauweiler Abbey (1053). He baptised and crowned the German king Henry IV.
- Hermann II, Count Palatine of Lotharingia (1064–1085), count of the Ruhrgau, Zulpichgau and Brabant. Hermann is assumed to be last of the Ezzonians. After his death (in a duel with Albert III of Namur, nearby his castle of Dalhem on 20 September 1085) the Palatinate of Lotharingia was suspended. His widow remarried with the first count palatine of the Rhine, Henry of Laach.

The surviving line of the Ezzonen descends from Adolf I of Lotharingia, son of Hermann I "Pusillus", Count palatine of Lotharingia.

=== Counts of Berg ===
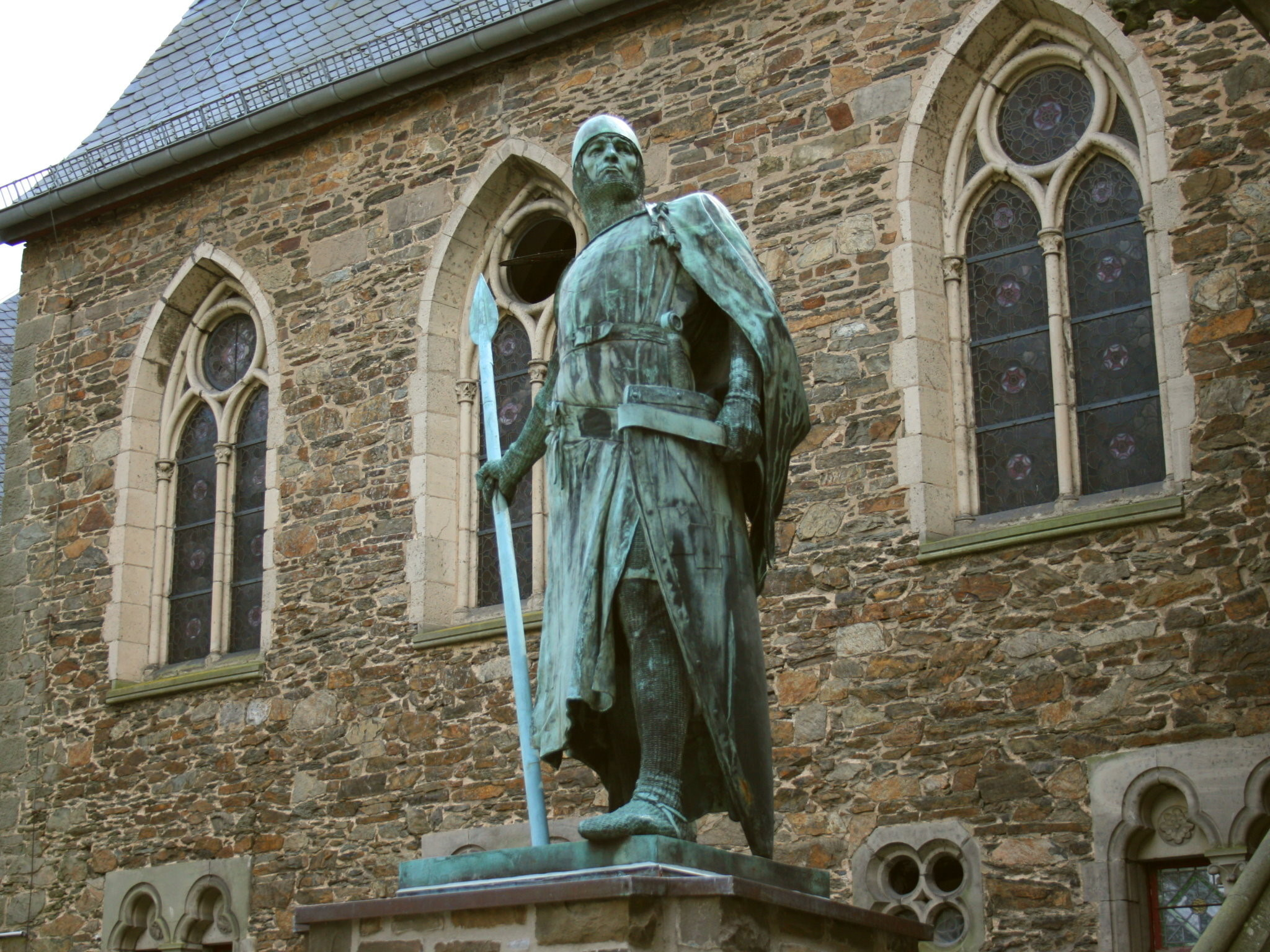
Statue of Adolf I de Monte, first Count of Berg, at Schloss Burg

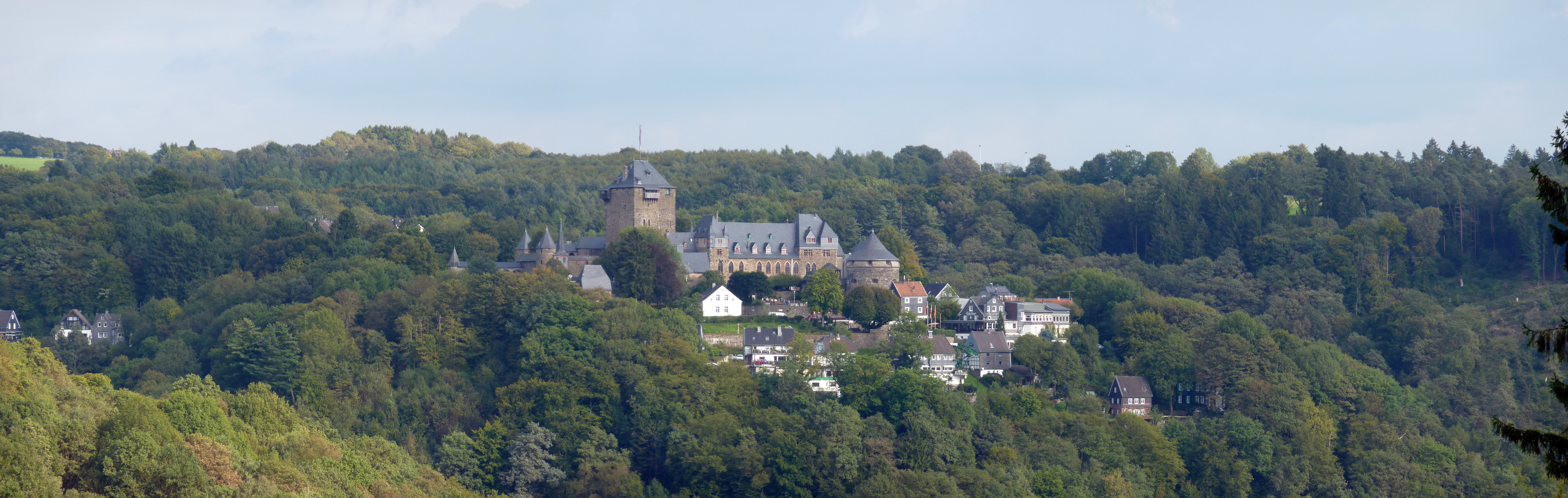
In 1133, count Adolf II built Schloss Burg on a mountain over the river Wupper. It remained the main residence of the counts of Berg until the 14th century. After the Thirty Years' War, in 1648, Imperial troops destroyed the fortifications of the castle.

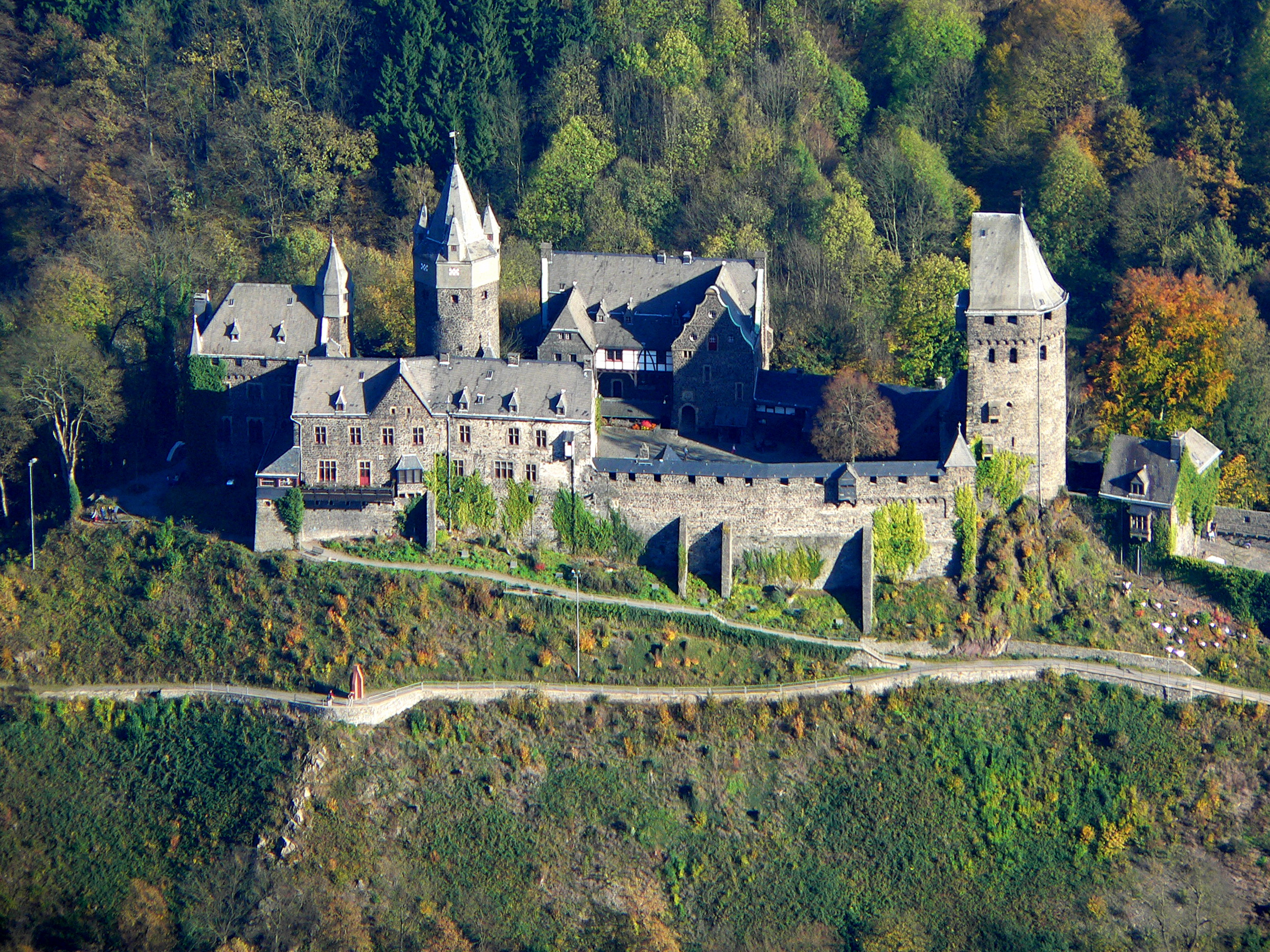
Count Frederick I of Altena purchased Schloss Mark near Hamm from the Edelherren of Rüdenberg and made it the residence of the new Counts of the Mark.

Adolf I of Lotharingia grandson, Adolf I of Berg, Vogt of Werden Abbey, became the first Count of Berg in 1050. The Counts of Berg became the most powerful dynasty in the Rhine region. Early rulers of Berg were:

- Adolf I of Lotharingia, count in Keldachgau, Vogt of Deutz from 1008 until 1018.
- Adolf II of Lotharingia, count in Keldachgau and Vogt of Deutz.
- Adolf I of Berg, 1st Count of Berg from 1077 till 1082, Vogt of Werden, Deutz, Berg and Gerresheim.
- Adolf II of Berg-Hövel (Huvili), Count of Berg from 1082 till 1093. He married in 1035 Adelheid von Laufen, heiress of Hövel, Unna, Telgte, Warendorf, etc. He founded the Altenberg monastery.
- Adolf III, Count of Berg from 1093 till 1132. His son, Eberhard of Berg, 1st Abbot of Georgenthal, convinced his brother Adolf IV to donate the Altenberg monastery to the Cistercian Order. His youngest son, Bruno II, Archbishop of Cologne, died in 1137 in Apulia on campaign with King Lothair of Germany against Roger II of Sicily.
- Adolf IV, Count of Berg from 1132 until 1160 and Count of Altena. He built the Schloss Altena, and built the Altenberg monastery, whose cloister he joined in 1160. He is father of one crusader (Adolf V, killed in Damascus in 1108), two Archbishops of Cologne and Duke of Westfalia and one Prince Bishop of Osnabrück.
- Engelbert I, Count of Berg from 1160 till 1189. He brought stability and prosperity to the county. In July 1189 he was killed on his way to the Holy Land with the Third Crusade.
- Adolf VI, Count of Berg from 1189 till 1218. In 1212 he took part to the Albigensian Crusade against the Cathars. He died in 1218 in combat as commander of the troops in Damiette, in the delta of the Nile, with the Fifth Crusade. He left no son, and Berg passed under the regency of his brother Engelbert II, then to his daughter Irmgard.
- Engelbert II of Berg, Archbishop of Cologne, Regent of Berg from 1218 till 1225, better known as Saint Engelbert of Cologne. He was killed by his cousin Frederick of Isenberg (see below).
- Irmgard, heiress of Berg until 1248, married to Henry IV Duke of Limburg, and future Count of Berg.

=== Counts of Altena and Isenberg ===
Eberhard IV of Berg, son of Adolf IV of Berg and Altena, inherited the eastern territorium of County of Berg. With him, the oldest line of the Counts of Berg takes from 1166 the name and title of Counts of Altena (on the Lenne, Westphalia). Eberhard's territorium was later divided between his two sons. His first son, Arnold of Altena, inherited the north-western territorium of Altena (on the Ruhr, Hattingen) in 1200. He founded the line of the Counts of Isenberg and later Counts of Limburg (see below). Frederick I, the second son, inherited the south-eastern territory of Altena, and founded of the line of the Counts von der Marck, from which descend the dukes of Cleves, Jülich and Berg, the dukes of Nevers and Bouillon, the counts of Schleiden, etc.

=== The murder: from Isenberg to Limburg ===
Frederick II, Count of Isenberg was a leading figure in the opposition of Westphalian nobles to the aggressive power politics of his cousin, the Archbishop of Cologne, Engelbert II of Berg. In 1225 at the Nobles' Assembly in Soest, Frederick met his cousin Engelbert von Berg in order to bring about a peaceful agreement concerning the stewardship (Vogtei) of the Abbey of Essen which Frederick, according to contemporary complaints, was abusing to his own benefit and to the detriment of the abbey. No conclusion was reached. During their return together from Soest to Cologne, Count Frederick arranged an ambush of his cousin, in a sunken lane of the early medieval historic road from Dortmund to Cologne near Gevelsberg late in the afternoon of 7 November 1225: the Archbishop was killed.

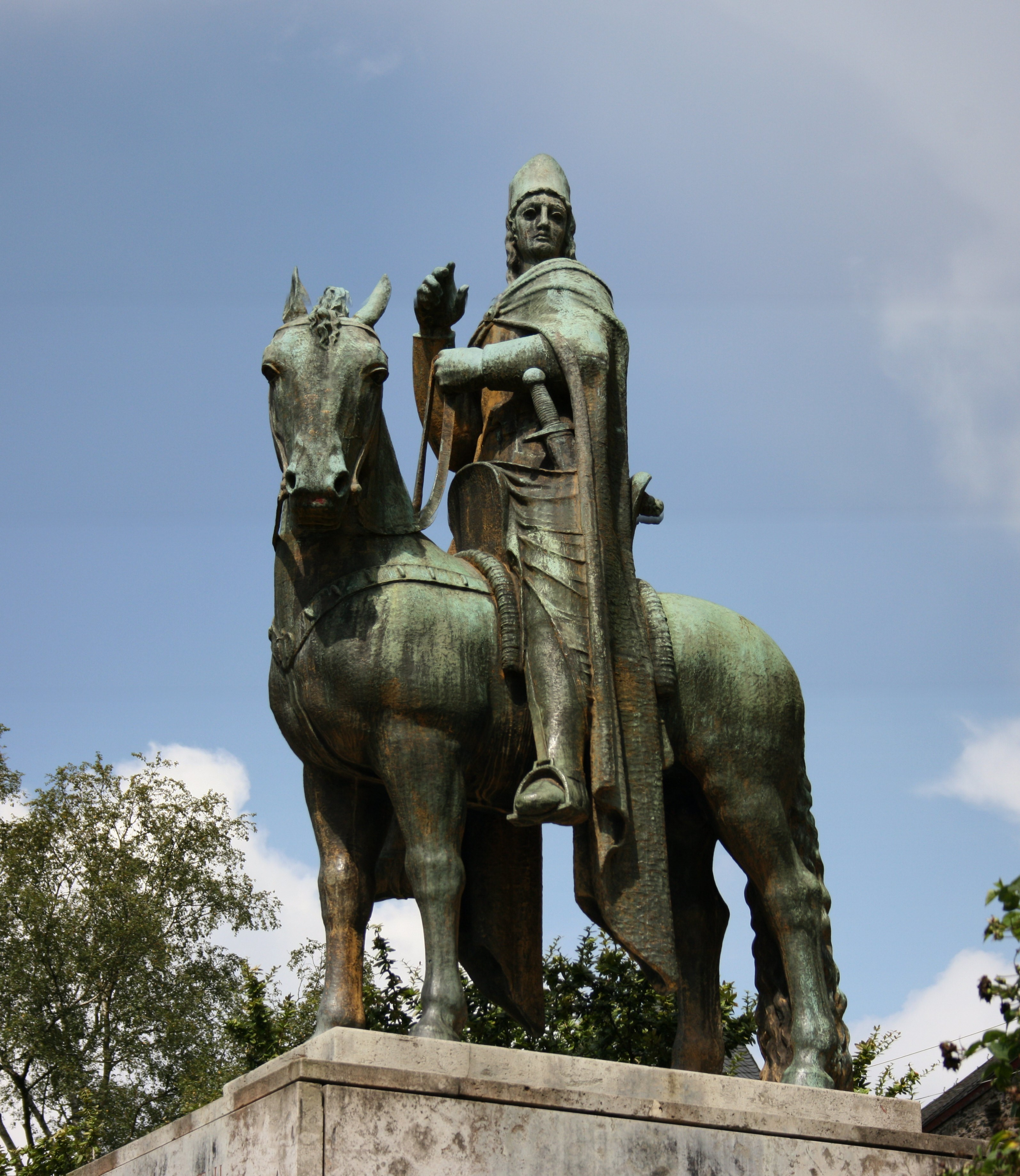
St Englebert II of Berg, Archbishop of Cologne

There is no consensus as to whether it was a deliberately planned murder, or whether the Archbishop was killed in the heat of combat. Current research assumes the latter: Engelbert was intended to have been taken into "knightly detention" so that the political demands of the opposing nobility could be pushed through. This was in accordance with the customs of the medieval feuding ethos.

Frederick of Isenberg was outlawed and excommunicated. He was stripped of all offices and stewardships and his personal wealth was confiscated. In the winter of 1225/1226 the new Archbishop of Cologne, Heinrich von Müllenark, besieged and destroyed his castle. His cousin, Adolf von der Mark, was attributed large portions of Frederick's possessions and as such re-united the former territory of Altena.

Frederick travelled with his brothers Dietrich and Engelbert, bishops of Münster and Osnabrück (both also implicated in the death of the Archbishop), and the notary of Isenberg with the necessary documents to the Curia in Rome, in order to have the excommunication lifted. On the return journey Frederick was taken prisoner at Liège and sold for 2,100 silver marks to the chapter of Cologne cathedral. On 14 November 1226 he was executed in front of the Severin Gate. His arms and legs were smashed and he was broken on the wheel, after which he was displayed on a stone pillar. He did not die until the next day.

His son Count Dietrich I of Isenberg, disinherited of all his territories in the Holy Roman Empire following the execution of his father, later fought with the military support of his uncle the Duke of Limburg, to retrieve his paternal inheritance. On 1 May 1243 a peace agreement was signed between Dietrich and Count Adolf von der Mark. He built the castles of Limburg (Hohenlimburg) and Neu Isenberg (soon lost in favour of the Counts von der Mark) and from 1246 took the title of Count of Limburg. Two of his son's, Johan and Eberhard founded two separate familylines. Johan the eldest died a few years after his marriage. Eberhard inherited after his father's death, the title of count of Limburg, (later on Limburg Broich) taking up residence at the castle Hohenlimburg an der Lenne.Johann acquired Mülheim an der Ruhr and thereby the castle of Styrum, taking up residence there.

=== 16th to 18th century ===
Count Georg of Limburg-Styrum married in 1539 Irmgarde van Wisch, Lady of Wisch op Oud-Wisch, Wildenborch, Overhagen and Lichtenvoorde, hereditary Countess of Bronckhorst. She inherited the possessions of her uncle, the last count of Bronckhorst and Borculo. Her considerable possessions passed to her son Hermann Georg of Limburg, and the family settled in Gelderland. His grandson, Jobst of Limburg-Styrum, married Maria of Holstein-Pinneberg, heiress of the immediate lordship of Gemen and of Illereichen. Gemen remained for two centuries in the possession of the Counts of Limburg Stirum.

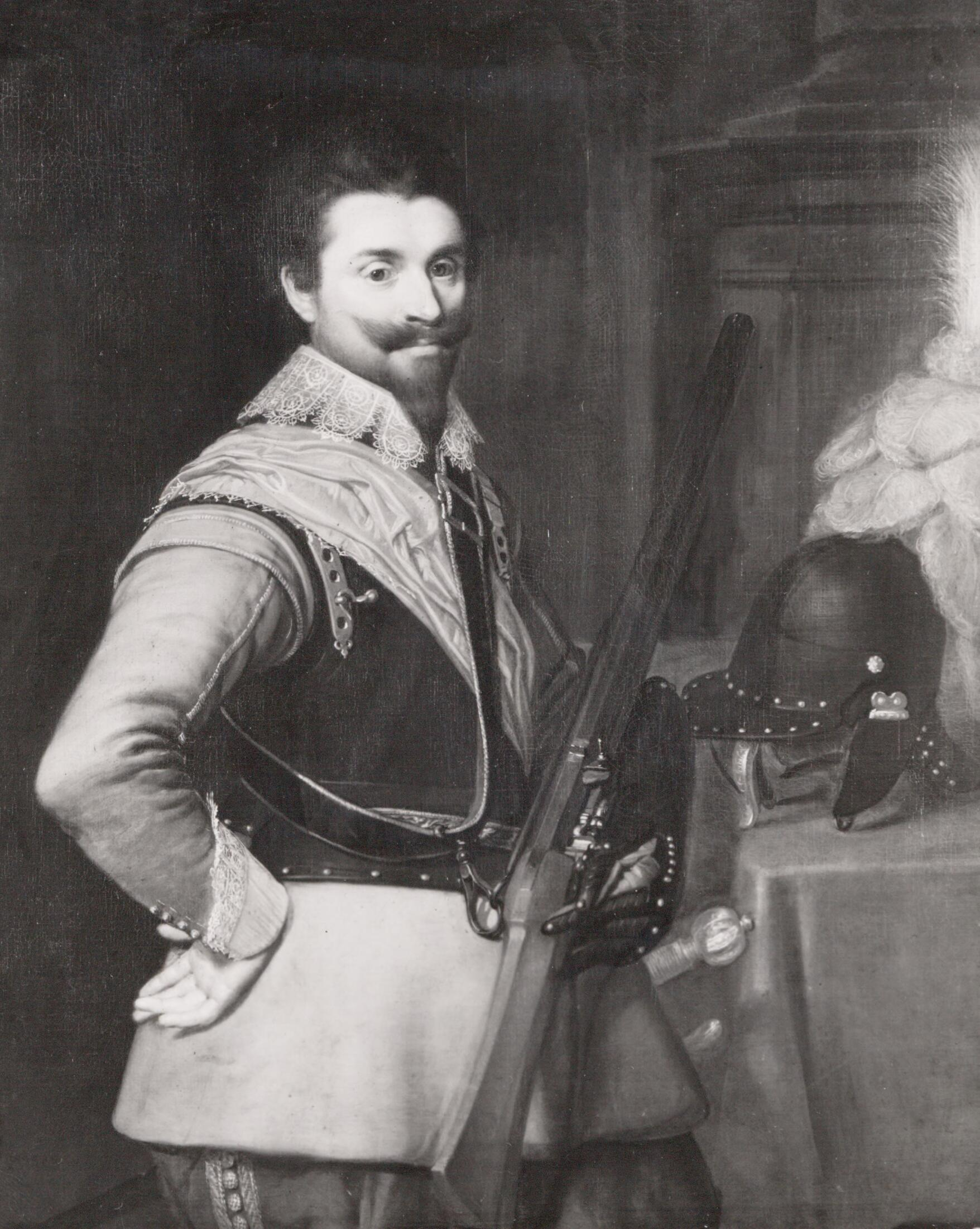
Herman Otto I

His son Herman Otto I, Count of Limburg and Bronckhorst, lord of Gemen, served in the armies of the Dutch Republic. He commanded Christian of Brunswick's rearguard at the Battle of Stadtlohn (1623) and the Dutch cavalry at the Siege of Groenlo (1627).

In 1644, the three sons of Hermann Otto I divided the family possessions among themselves:

==== Limburg Bronckhorst ====
Otto of Limburg obtained the territories of Bronckhorst and Borculo, founding the older line, still flourishing.

In the long conflict (known as the "Borculo question") between the heirs of the last count of Limburg-Bronckhorst, Joost (deceased in 1553 without children), and the Prince-Bishop of Münster over ownership of Borculo, the Court of Gelderland ruled on 20 December 1615 in favour of Count Joost. The ruling was imposed by troops from Zutphen, taking over the castle and city of Lichtenvoorde in December 1615, and the castle and city of Borculo in February 1616 after short combat. Prince Bishop Christoph Bernhard von Galen, tried twice more to keep Borculo under Münster's authority, but without success.

The lordship of Bronckhorst was sold in 1721 by Maria of Limburg Styrum and in 1726 the lordship of Borculo was sold by Count Leopold to the count of Flodorf.

==== Limburg Stirum Gemen ====
Adolf Ernst of Limburg Stirum obtained the immediate lordship of Gemen and Illereichen in the 1644 partition and ruled it until his death in 1657, founding the line of Limburg Stirum Gemen. In 1782, with the extinction of the Gemen branch, Gemen was inherited by the line of Limburg Stirum Iller-Aicheheim

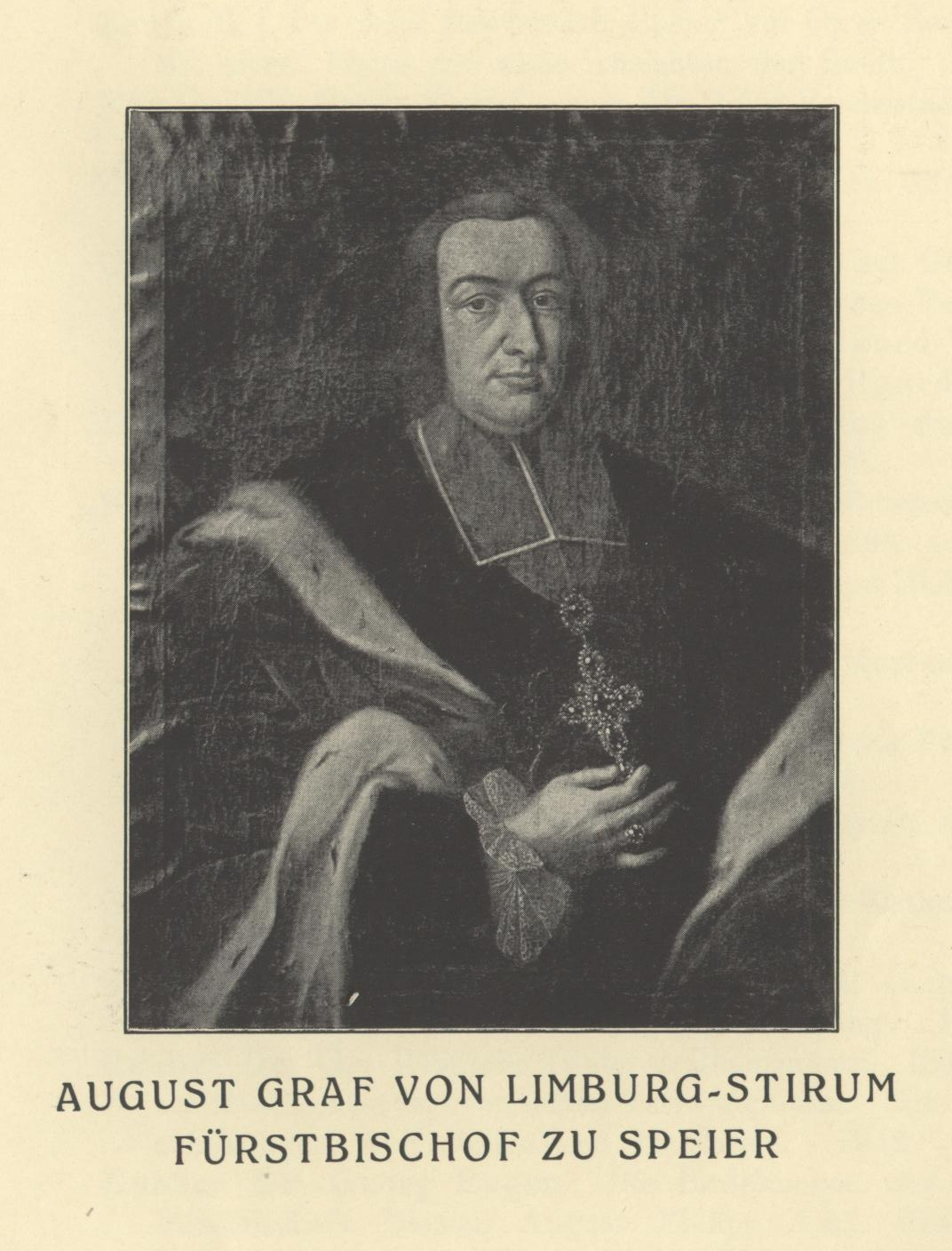
August Philip of Limburg Stirum, was Prince Bishop of Speyer and lord of Gemen.

- 1657–1675 - Countess Maria Isabella von Vehlen und Meggen zu Raesfeld, wife of Adolf Ernst, was regent of Gemen after the death of her husband. The reason for the long regency is not known.
- 1675–1704 - Hermann Otto II of Limburg Stirum and Bronckhorst, lord of Gemen, son of the above. He fought in the War of the Spanish Succession in the service of the Holy Roman Emperor Leopold I against France and Bavaria. In 1703, he lost the Battle of Höchstädt against the French-Bavarian forces. In 1704, he led the second assault on enemy positions in the Battle of Schellenberg and was mortally wounded, dying a few days later;
- 1704–1743 - Otto Leopold of Limburg Stirum and Bronckhorst, lord of Gemen and Raesfeld, inherited Gemen at the death of his father. He also inherited from his grandfather Alexander IV, Count von Velen zu Raesfeld the lordship of Raesfeld;
- 1743–1771 - Friedrich Karl of Limburg Stirum and Bronckhorst, lord of Gemen, son of Otto Leopold. He died in 1771 without descendants and both Gemen and Raesfeld passed to his brother, August Philip;
- 1771–1776 - August Philip, Prince-Bishop of Speyer, Count of Limburg Stirum and Bronckhorst, lord of Gemen, brother of the above;
- 1776–1798 - Karl Josef, Count of Limburg Stirum, lord of Gemen, cousin of the above;
- 1798–1800 - Ferdinand IV, Count of Limburg Stirum zu Illereichen, grandson of the above, was the last lord of Gemen before it passed to the barons von Bomelberg in 1800.

In 1806, Gemen was mediatized to the princes of Salm-Kyrburg. It passed to France in 1810, then to Prussia in 1814.

==== Limburg Styrum ====
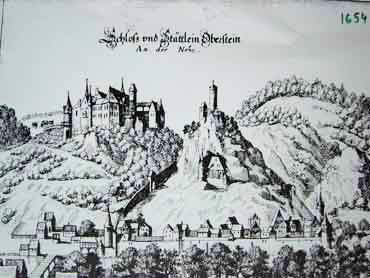
Oberstein passed to the Limburg Styrum in the 18th century, until its mediatization in 1801

Moritz of Limburg-Styrum obtained the ownership of Mülheim an der Ruhr and thereby of the immediate lordship of Styrum, and later Oberstein. Here he founded the line of counts of Limburg-Styrum-Styrum, extinct in 1809. Moritz later also became hereditary banneret of the Principality of Guelders and of the County of Zutphen. He married his cousin Maria Bernhardine of Limburg-Bronckhorst.

In the mediatisation of 1806, Styrum came under control of the Grand Duchy of Berg. The last count of Limburg-Styrum-Styrum, Ernst (deceased on 23 March 1809) left Styrum to the sister of his wife, Maria Margaretha von Humbracht, who sold it in 1825. Oberstein was mediatized at the Treaty of Lunéville in 1801, however Ernst was never compensated by the Final Recess of the Empire in 1803.

==== Mediatisation ====
The Limburg Stirum held seats in the Holy Roman Empire's Imperial Diet until 1800, through their possessions of immediate lordships in Gemen, Oberstein, Styrum, etc.

When the branch of Gemen became extinct in 1800, the branch of Styrum failed to inherit their possessions, and Gemen passed to the barons von Boyneburg-Bömelberg. In 1806 the Confederation of the Rhine occurred and Gemen was mediatised to the Principality of Salm-Kyrburg.

At the same moment Styrum was mediatised to the Grand Duchy of Berg. This branch became extinct three years later, in 1809. Since the Limburg Stirum held no imperial estate when the Holy Roman Empire was dissolved in 1806 (Gemen had been lost in 1800 and it is unclear if the Styrum branch did inherit the dynastic rights associated with Gemen), nor were any Limburg Stirum living in the German Confederation when the Congress of Vienna finalised the distinctions between the sovereign and non-sovereign dynasties of the former Empire (at that time all members were living in the newly created Kingdom of the Netherlands), the House of Limburg Stirum's centuries of previous status as immediate Reichsgrafen was not internationally recognised, nor was their head granted the style of Erlaucht (Illustrious Highness) and they were omitted from Section II of the Almanach de Gotha, which listed therein the other princely and countly families of mediatised dynastic rank. The house of Limburg Stirum is nevertheless considered part of the Standesherren by most authors on the subject.

=== 19th century until today ===
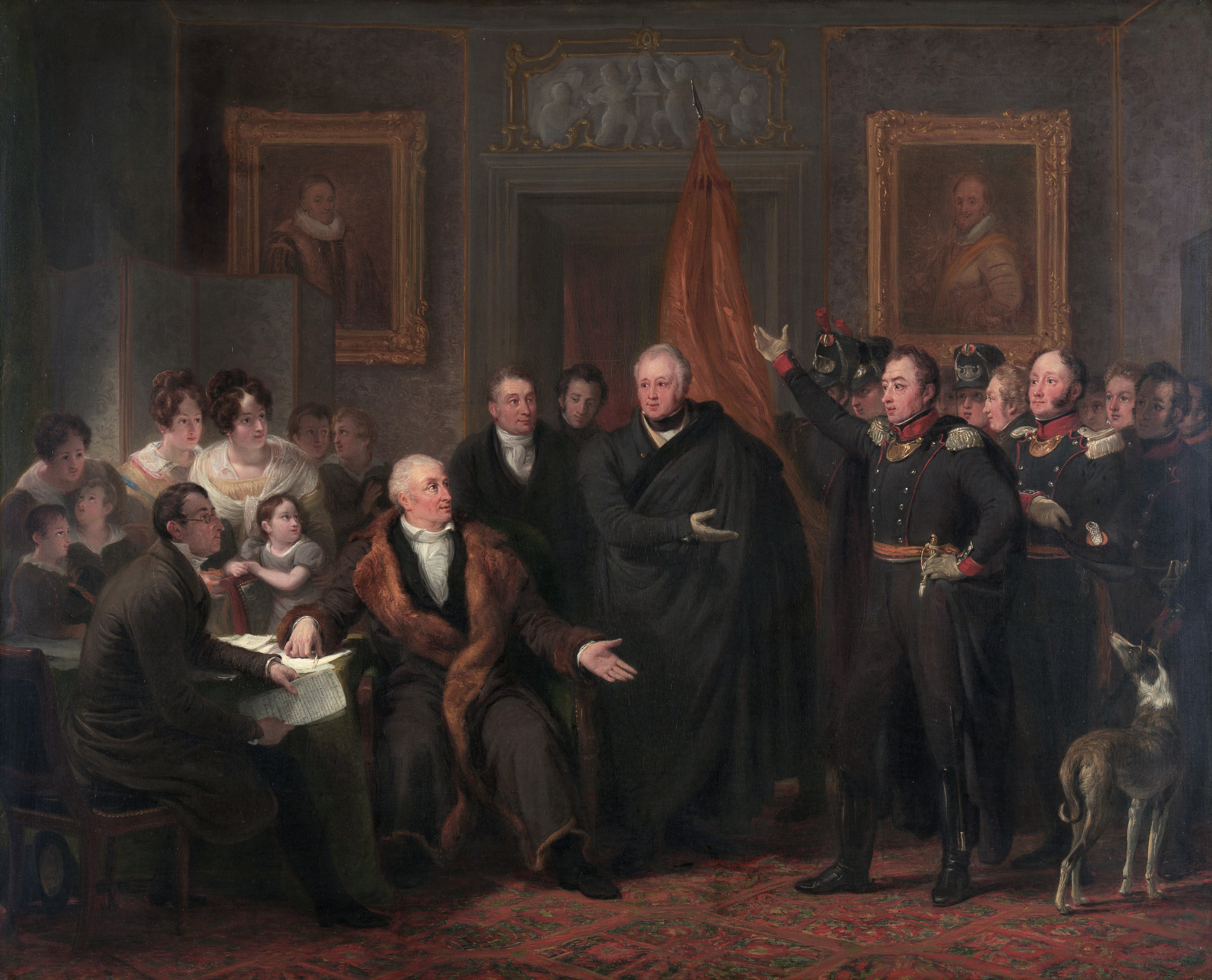
The Triumvirate Assuming Power on Behalf of the Prince of Orange by Jan Willem Pieneman (1828). On Sunday 21 November 1813, Leopold of Limburg Stirum assuming power as part of the triumvirate, in order to re-establish the monarchy in the Netherlands. Painting by Jan Willem Pieneman (1779–1853).

The titles of the House of Limburg Stirum were confirmed in 1812 by Napoleon I and in 1814 the family was recognised in the nobility of the Kingdom of the Netherlands (name: van Limburg Stirum).

Notable figures in recent history are:

- Leopold, Count of Limburg Stirum (1758–1840), Lieutenant General of Dutch Infantry, and member of the Driemanschap, the triumvirate that took power in 1813 in the name of the Prince of Orange-Nassau in order to establish the monarchy in the Netherlands. The three statesmen invited the exiled Prince of Orange, later King William I of the Netherlands, to The Hague to avoid anarchy following the retreat of France's troops, and to avoid possible absorption of the Netherlands by Prussia or England.
- Menno David, Count of Limburg Stirum (1807–1891) was a Dutch general and government minister. He lost his right leg during the Siege of Antwerp (1832). After serving as Dutch minister of war he became aide-de-camp and advisor to King William III of the Netherlands.
- Friedrich zu Limburg-Stirum was a German diplomat and politician who served as foreign minister of Germany in 1880–1881.
- Mathilde van Limburg Stirum (1854–1932), secret fiancée of William, Prince of Orange, son and heir of King William III of the Netherlands, and great-grandmother of Cara Delevingne.
- Johan Paul van Limburg Stirum (1873–1948), Dutch diplomat and reformist Governor-General of the Dutch East Indies. He worked for the economic development, decentralisation and the autonomy of the colony. He would later become ambassador to Berlin where he was known for his critical views on National Socialism, even refusing Nazi officials entry to the Dutch embassy. After leaving Berlin he would serve as Dutch envoy to London.
- Otto Ernst Gelder van Limburg Stirum was a Dutch magistrate and maternal uncle to Audrey Hepburn. As a prominent Dutchman he was taken hostage by the German occupiers and was one of five Dutchmen to be executed in retaliation for resistance activities on 17 April 1942. These five were the first Dutch hostages to suffer this fate.
- Charles de Limburg Stirum (15 September 1906 – 14 June 1989), a Belgian senator, member of the armed resistance during World War II, was later Grand Master of the Royal Households of King Leopold III of Belgium. He became a Knight of the Order of the Golden Fleece (Austrian branch).
- Franz von Limburg Stirum, a claimant to the headship of the House, lives in Finland.

== Others ==
- The Limburg-Styrum Dragoons Regiment fought with six squadrons (500 men) during the battles of Schellenberg and Blenheim in 1704 during the War of the Spanish Succession; and in the Battle of Melle in 1745 during the War of the Austrian Succession. The Styrum Dragoons uniform was a red coat with green facings, white buttons and straw-yellow breeches. It was disbanded in 1748.
- The Counts of Limburg Stirum created two orders of knighthood: the Order of the Four Emperors and the Order of St Philip of the Lion of Limburg. In 1806 the Counts of Limburg Stirum were mediatized and lost their rights on their territories. However the Order of St Philip of the Lion of Limburg was still in use until 1838.
- Limburg Stirum is also the name of a mountain, 2350 meters high, standing in the Belgica Mountains in Antarctic. It was discovered by the Belgian expedition (1957–58) under G. de Gerlache, who named it for Count Charles de Limburg Stirum, a patron of the expedition.
- The Jerusalem Church in Bruges (Belgium) was founded in 1428 by the Adornes family. Anselm Adornes completed this remarkable building after his return from pilgrimage to Jerusalem. It was intended to be a copy of the Church of the Holy Sepulchre in Jerusalem. The Jerusalem Church is still today private property and belongs to the Limburg Stirum as direct descendants of the Adornes.
- In Belgium, Count Evrard de Limburg Stirum (1927–2001), the oldest son of Thierry, Count of Limburg Stirum and Princess Marie-Immaculée de Croÿ, married Princess Hélène d'Orléans (1934–), a daughter of Henri d'Orléans, Comte de Paris, the Orléanist claimant to the throne of France. After several years in Rhodesia, they settled in the Castle of Huldenberg in Belgium.
- Count Alexis de Limburg Stirum married, in the Castle of Ussé (France), Béatrix de Blacas d'Aulps, daughter of the 7th Duke and Prince of Blacas d'Aulps. They live in the castle of Walzin (Belgium).
- Count Rodolphe de Limburg Stirum, son of Count Christian de Limburg Stirum and grandson of Count Thierry, married on 6 December 2008 in Mechelen, Archduchess Marie-Christine of Austria, a niece of Henri, Grand Duke of Luxembourg. She is the great-granddaughter of King Leopold III of Belgium through her mother Archduchess Marie Astrid of Austria, and of Emperor Charles I of Austria through her father Archduke Carl Christian of Austria. They have three sons (Leopold, Constantin and Gabriel).

== Family Tree ==
The House of Limburg-Styrum is a descended from the House of Isenberg and the House of Berg, and so related to the House of la Marck:

Genealogy of the House of Limburg-Stirum

House of Limburg-Styrum

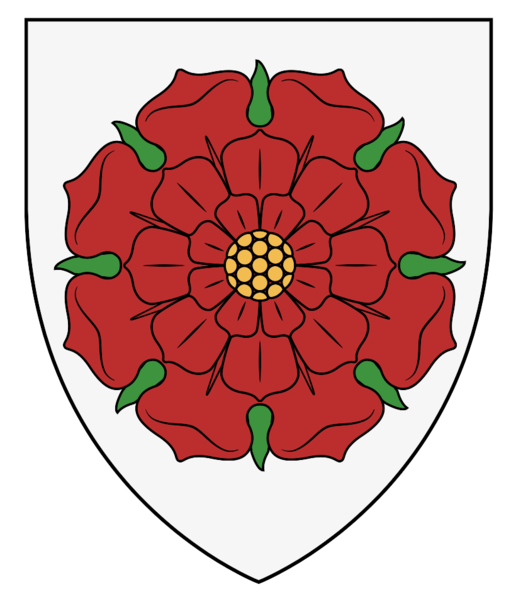
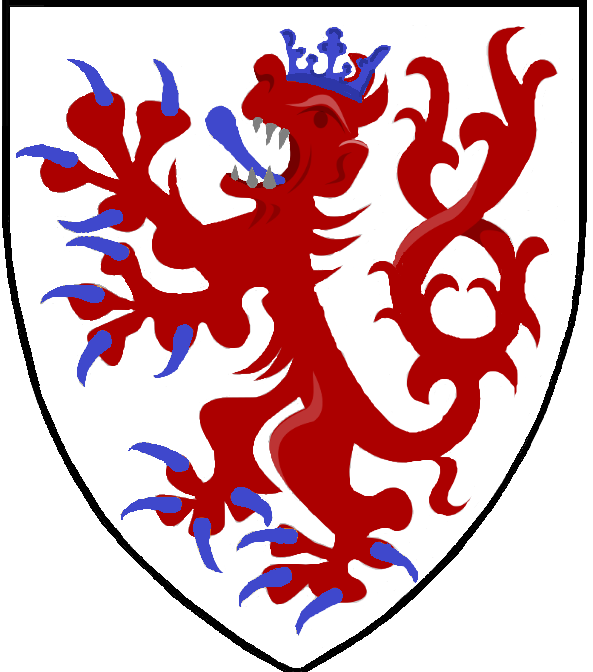
Adolf IV of Berg d. after 1161	Irmgard of Schwarzenberg
Eberhard I of Berg-Altena c.1140–1180	Adelheid of Arnsberg d. c.1200
Arnold of Altena d. c.1209	Mechthild/Mathilde identity disputed in secondary genealogies
Frederick of Isenberg c.1193–1226 attained(see above)	Sophie of Limburg, d. of Waleran III, Duke of Limburg
Dietrich I of Isenberg before 1215–1301; 1st "Count of Limburg" (in fact Counts of Limburg Hohenlimburg and Broich)	Adelheid of Sayn
Heinrich of Limburg (living 1240-1246)	Johann of Isenberg-Limburg before 1246–before 1277	Agnes of Wildenberg	Everhardt I (1253–1308); C. of Limburg-Hohenlimburg
Dietrich II of Isenberg-Limburg & Limburg-Styrum c.1265/70–1328 Lord of Styrum	Bertradis (Berta) of Götterswick	Friedrich, a canon in Cologne (born before 1277, died 1321);	Diederik II count of Limburg Hohenlimburg (1276 - 1364)
Johann of Limburg-Styrum c.1285–1364 Count of Stirum	(1st) Uda von Ravensberg (2nd) Margareta von Ahaus	Dietrich IV of Limburg, count of Stirum	Everhard II van Limburg Hohenlimburg ca. 1298 died 11 November 1344. Married to Jutta of Sayn.	Diederik c. 1299-1338	Hendrik c. 1299-1324
Dietrich III of Limburg-Styrum c.1347–1398	Johanna of Reifferscheid d. c.1384	Johann, a canon at Mülheim an der Ruhr;	Diederik III (1328–1401) count of Limburg Hohenlimburg, and Broich	Johan of Limburg-Hohenlimburg (1373–1459); Lord of Limburg-Hardenberg
Friedrich fl. 1378–97	Johann fl. 1379–96	Eberhard III of Limburg-Styrum c.1380–c.1424/26	Ponzetta of Neuenahr-Dyck/ Saffenberg d. c.1450	Dietrich (fl. 1387);[7] Godert, a canon in Cologne (1432); Gerhard (fl. 1421);	Diederick IV (b. ~1375) Count of Limburg Hohenlimburg Broich	William I (1373–1459) c. of Limburg -Hohenlimburg lord of Broich	Everhart; Lord of Limburg in the territory of Hardenberg; Family branch died out in 1429
Wilhelm I of Limburg-Styrum c.1422–c.1498	Agnes of Limburg c.1425–c.1493 m.1448	Eberhard, a canon in Köln, fl 1450; Hermann, +1489	Wilhelm II count of Limburg Broich (1416-1473), C. of Limburg-Broich,1446 - 1473, married in 1463 Jutta of Runkel	Heinrich count of Limburg Broich 1417-1486, C. of Limburg-Broich,1439 - 1446. married in 1450 Irmgard of Boimelburg died 6 June 1483 (Köln)	Dietrich V c. of Limburg Broich (1419-22 -1478 )unmarried,Amtmann Iserlohn 1461 Eberhard of Limburg 1420-1453 Canon of St. Gereon Köln 1450 Cellar of Abbey Werden John of Limburg-Broich, 1421-1472 Probst zu Werden. Resign from the Abbey. Married approx. 1468 Anna Borckhartz zu Schenkenbush	Johann fl 1411
Adolf of Limburg-Styrum c.1450–1506 C. of Limburg in Styrum	Elisabeth of Reichenstein d.1529 m.1487	John of Limburg-Broich, +1510; C. of Limburg-Broich, 1473 - 1508, m.1492 Elisabeth von Neuenahr
William, C. of Limburg, +before 1522	Georg of Limburg-Styrum c.1500–1552 C. of Limburg in Styrum	Irmgard of Wisch c.1505–1587 m.1539, C. of Bronckhorst, heiress of Borculo, Wisch, Wildenborch, Overhagen and Lichtenvoorde
Hermann Georg of Limburg; 1540–1574; C. of Limburg-Styrum, Bronkhorst, heer in Stirum, Wisch en Borculo	Maria of Hoya; 1534–1612 m.1554
Jobst of Limburg-Styrum; 1560–1621	Maria of Schauenburg and Holstein-Pinneberg; 1559–1616 m.1591	Jan van Stirum (1567-1613), married in 1612 Walburga Anna of Daun, countess of Falkenstein
Hermann Otto I (1592–1644) count of Limburg and Bronckhorst, Lord of Styrum and Gemen; General of Dutch States Army	Anna Magdalene; Spies von Büllesheim c.1595/99–1659 m.1618	Wilhelm Friedrich of Limburg (died 1636);	Johann Adolf of Limburg (died 1624). He married Walpurga Anna von Daun, countess von Falkenstein (d.1618);	Georg Ernst of Limburg Stirum, count of Limburg Stirum, count of Bronckhorst, Lord of Wisch, Lichtenvoorde and Wildenborch (died 1666)	Sophie Margarete of Nassau, d. of Count John VII "the Middle/de Middelste" of Nassau-Siegen (1610-1665)	Bernhard Albrecht of Limburg and Bronckhorst (died 1669);
Otto of Limburg-Styrum; 1620–1679 count of Limburg, Bronckhorst, Wisch and Borculo, hereditary banneret of the Principality of Guelders and of the county of Zutphen; Gen. of Dutch States Army	Elisabeth Charlotte of Dohna-Carwinden; 1625–1691 m.1643	Adolf Ernst, count of Limburg Styrum, Sovereign Lord of Gemen (died 1657), Gemmen Line to 1782	Moritz, count of Limburg and Bronkhorst, Lord of Styrum; line of Lords of Mülheim an der Ruhr & Limburg-Styrum-Styrum, mediatized 1806
Otto Christoffel, who was killed in 1673; Karl, born around 1650: Gustav born around 1655:	Albrecht Georg of Limburg, count of Limburg and Bronckhorst (born 1660, died 1690);	Adolf Gelder, born in 1659 and killed in Mastricht in 1676;	Friedrich Wilhelm of Limburg, count of Limburg and Bronckhorst (1649 -1722)	Lucia van Aylva; 1660–1722 m.1683	Hermann Otto II, count of Limburg Stirum and Bronckhorst, Lord zu Gemen Imperial Field Marshal (1646 - Battle of Schellenberg 1704);	Gottfried Ferdinand of Limburg Stirum, who died in 1677;	Maximilian Wilhelm of Limburg Stirum, died in 1728;	Moritz Hermann of Limburg (1664 – 1703) count of Limburg Stirum at/zu Limburg-Styrum-Styrum
Maria, heiress of the county of Bronckhorst (1689–1759). m. 1714 Landgrave Philipp of Hesse-Philippsthal (died 1717).	Otto II Ernst Gelder van Limburg Stirum (1685–1769)	Anna Lucia van Klinkenberg; 1698–1772 m.1722	Albert Dominicus of Limburg and Bronckhorst (1686 – 1704, in Portugal);	Friedrich Heinrich of Limburg and Bronckhorst (1689–1740);	Leopold of Limburg and Bronckhorst (1694–1728), who married in 1722 Helene de Haze (1681–1753);	Otto Leopold Ernst, count of Limburg Styrum and Bronckhorst, sovereign lord zu Gemen and lord zu Raesfeld (1688 - 1754);	Leopold Otto Johann Wilhelm (1681 - 1726)	Karl Joseph Alois (1685-1738)	12 others, incl. Max. (1686-1705); Alex. (1696-1764); Julius (1699-1732); Ferdinand I, sovereign lord zu Gemen (1701 - 1791)	Christian Otto, count of Limburg Bronkhorst and Stirum (25 March 1694 – 24 February 1749);	(Johann) Philipp Wilhelm, count of Limburg Stirum (22 April 1695 - 1 December 1758)	Bern. Alex. (1698–1758) Karl Moritz (1701–1744); Jo. Ludwig (1702–1706).
Frederik Willem van Limburg Stirum; 1723–1747	Theodora Aurelia van Coehoorn; 1721–1782 m.1746	Albert Dominicus (1725–1776)	Friedrich Karl (1710–1771), the Count of Limburg Styrum and Bronckhorst, Sovereign Lord of Gemen.	August Philipp Karl (1721–1797), Prince-Bishop of Speyer; succ. C. of Limburg Styrum and Bronckhorst, and Sov. Lord of Gemen.	Maximilian Anton (born in 1713, probably died in 1726),	Karl Joseph, count of Limburg Stirum, sovereign lord zu Gemen (died 1798);	Johann, count of Limburg Stirum (born 1726, died 1750)	Karl Joseph August (1727 - 1760): sovereign lord of Oberstein and Styrum, 1749 m. & 1 dau.	Philipp Ferdinand of Limburg-Stirum (1734 - 1794); sov.lord of Oberstein and Styrum, 1760	Ernst Maria Johann Nepomuk; (1736 - 1809) sov. lord of Oberstein, 1794,lost it at the Treaty of Lunéville, 1801. never compensated by the Final Recess of 1803]; m. no des.
Frederik Theodor Ernst van Limburg Stirum; 1747–1808	Johanna Spree; 1750–1779 m.1774	Otto Ernst Gelder (1752 - 1826); 10 children, incl.	Samuel John (1754 - 1824)	Frederik Albert, *17.9.1756, +22.1.1817;	Leopold Karel, Count of Limburg Stirum ( 1758 – 1840); General, Min of War in Triumvirate of 1813, Lieutenant general of the Neth. & Gov. of The Hague, 1815	Willem Bernard (1761 - 1793), many desc. in Belgium (Cleves13)
Frederik Willem van Limburg Stirum; 1774–1858	Elizabeth Richards; 1778–1863 m.1802	Louis Gaspard Adrien,(1802 - 1884) (Cleves12)	Albert Otto Ernst, (1803 - 1858)	Wigbold Albert Willem, (1786-1855)	Otto Jan Herbert, (1789-1851)	Frederik Govert,(1790-k.a.Leipzig 16.10.1813)
Frederik Adriaan van Limburg Stirum; 1804–1874	Johanna Franzisca; Victorine Ebers; 1808–1878 m.1834	Julius Bernard, (1815-1893), descs.	Otto Ernst Gelder, (1828-1879), 1 s. Sjuck Bernhard Walraad, (1867-1954) but no desc.	Martinus (1830-1897), 1s. Louis Gaspard Adrien (1862-1924)	Samuel John (1832- Arnhem,1926); 1s.Louis Gaspard Adrien(1865-Arnheim 1940), 1s. Samuel John(1894-1963);1 s. James (1942-1967) & 1s. James Alexander Roger, (1971-)	Constantijn Willem (1837-Arnheim 1905); sons. Jan Pieter Adolf (Arnheim 1866-1902), sons: Otto Ernst Gelder, (1893- shot as a hostage at Goirle 1942) m. Wilhelmina Cornelia, Bss van Heemstra (1897- +?), aunt of; Audrey Hepburn through her sister Ella van Heemstra: Constantijn Willem(1900,-1976) w/desc.	Leopold (1818-1900)	Frederik Albert Govert (1819-1900)	Willem (1822-1888)	Lodewijk (1823-1882)	Albert (1825-1893)
Friedrich Wilhelm van Limburg Stirum; 1835–1912; German Dipl.	Paula Minette Therese; Nanny Amalie von Meyerinck; 1844–1925 m.1865	Leopold (1882-1943)	Otto Jan Herbert (1855-1909)	Ernst Louis (1857-1899)	Otto Jan Herbert (1862-1937)	Emelius Leopold (1864-1950)	Willem Frederik Hendrik (1867-1925)
Friedrich Wilhelm Richard Paul van Limburg Stirum (1871–1951); German admin.	Lucie von Lieres und Wilkau; 1885–1909 m.1907	Richard Heinrich Kurt (1874-1931)	Menno Johannes Otto Hubert Viktor (1881-1953)	Wigbold Albert Willem (1912-1943)	Frans Willem, *Noordwijk (1915-?)	Willem (1889-1958)	Leopold (1896-1970)	Francis Willem (1898-1951)	Willem Wigbold (1910-1951)
Friedrich Wilhelm Johannes; Richard Guidotto van Limburg Stirum (1909–1979); Sweden	Mary Katharina Heybroek; 1909–1965 m.1937; div.1952	Leopold Franklin, New York (1947-1982)	Frans Frederik(1952- )	Leopold, (*The Hague 1948)	Ronald Onno Leopold Francis, *Soekamandi 4.10.1935	Koenraad Wigbold, *Leiden 30.4.1933
Friedrich Wilhelm BJÖRN Sigurd (1939-1966)	Franz Gisbert Johannes; Graf van Limburg Stirum b.1943 present claimant/head of the house, lives in Finland	Marianne von Julin b.1943 m.1974; div.2011	Tristan Johnson (*New York 1982)	Willem Alexander, (*Edmonton 1984)	Miranda Louisa, *Utrecht 8.7.1963	Rolf Benno Leopold Francis, *Utrecht 27.5.1966	Sjuck Oncko Leopold, *Utrecht 15.6.1969	Digna Leopoldine Wendela, *Utrecht 15.6.1969
Fredrik Wilhelm Jacob; Graf van Limburg Stirum b.1974	Helena Rosenlew b.1982 m.2011; div.2025	Leopold Willem, *Drachten 1.10.1960	Nancy Marianne, *Drachten 12.12.1961	Wendaline Elisabeth, *Oss 18.5.1964	Otto Maarten, *Oss 2.10.1965
Ellen Lovisa Elisabeth; Gravin van Limburg Stirum b.2012	Mary Charlotta Sophie; Gravin van Limburg Stirum b.2013	Otto Fredrik Wilhelm; Graf van Limburg Stirum b.2016

== Gallery ==
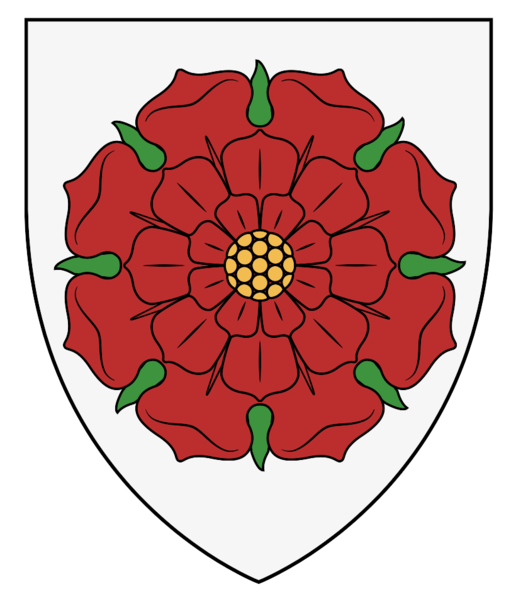
Original Arms of House of Isenberg used for the County of Altena

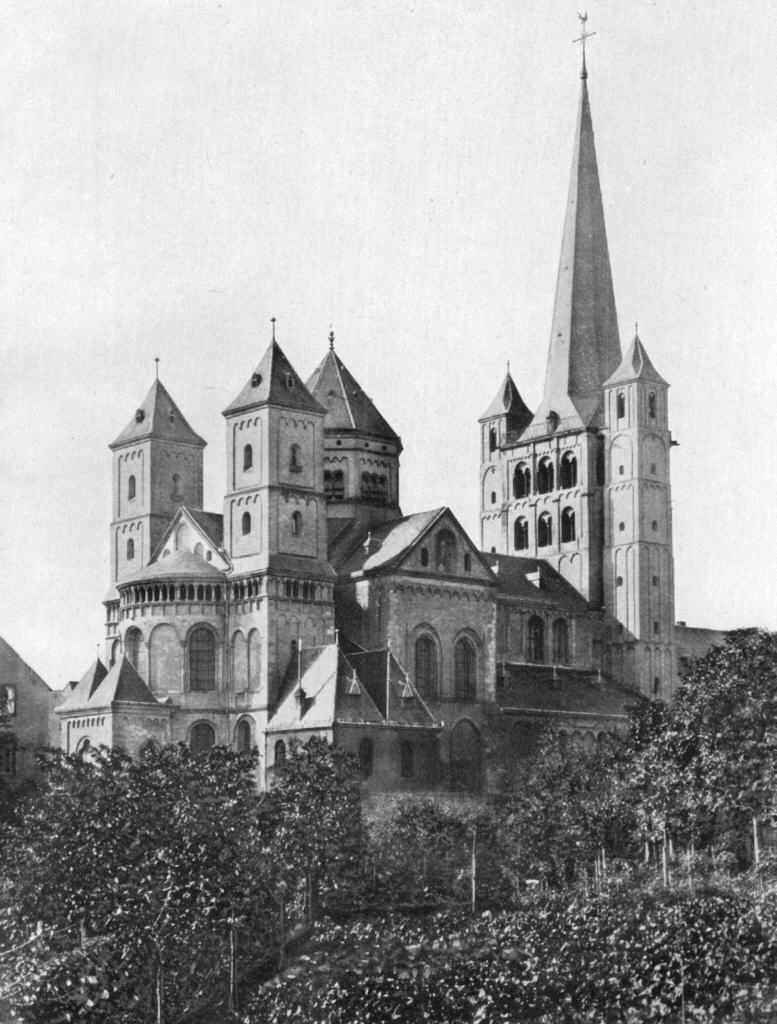
Brauweiler Abbey was founded in the early 11th century by Pfalzgraf Ezzo of Lotharingia and his wife Mathilde, daughter of the German Emperor Otto II, near Cologne, the place where their marriage had been celebrated.

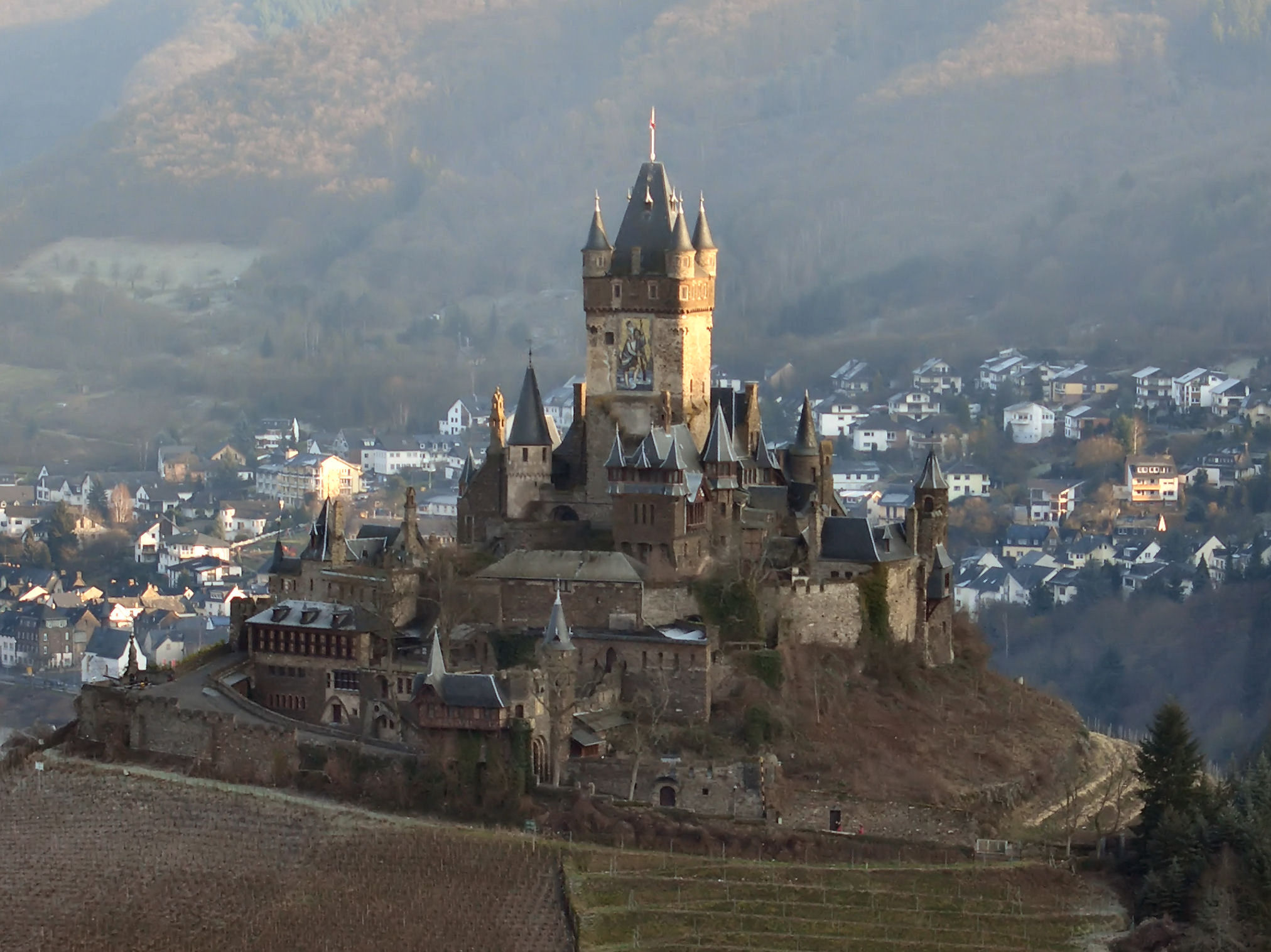
Pfalzgraf Heinrich received the castle Cochem from Queen Richenza of Poland. She wanted to prevent her nephew Conrad I from inheriting it.

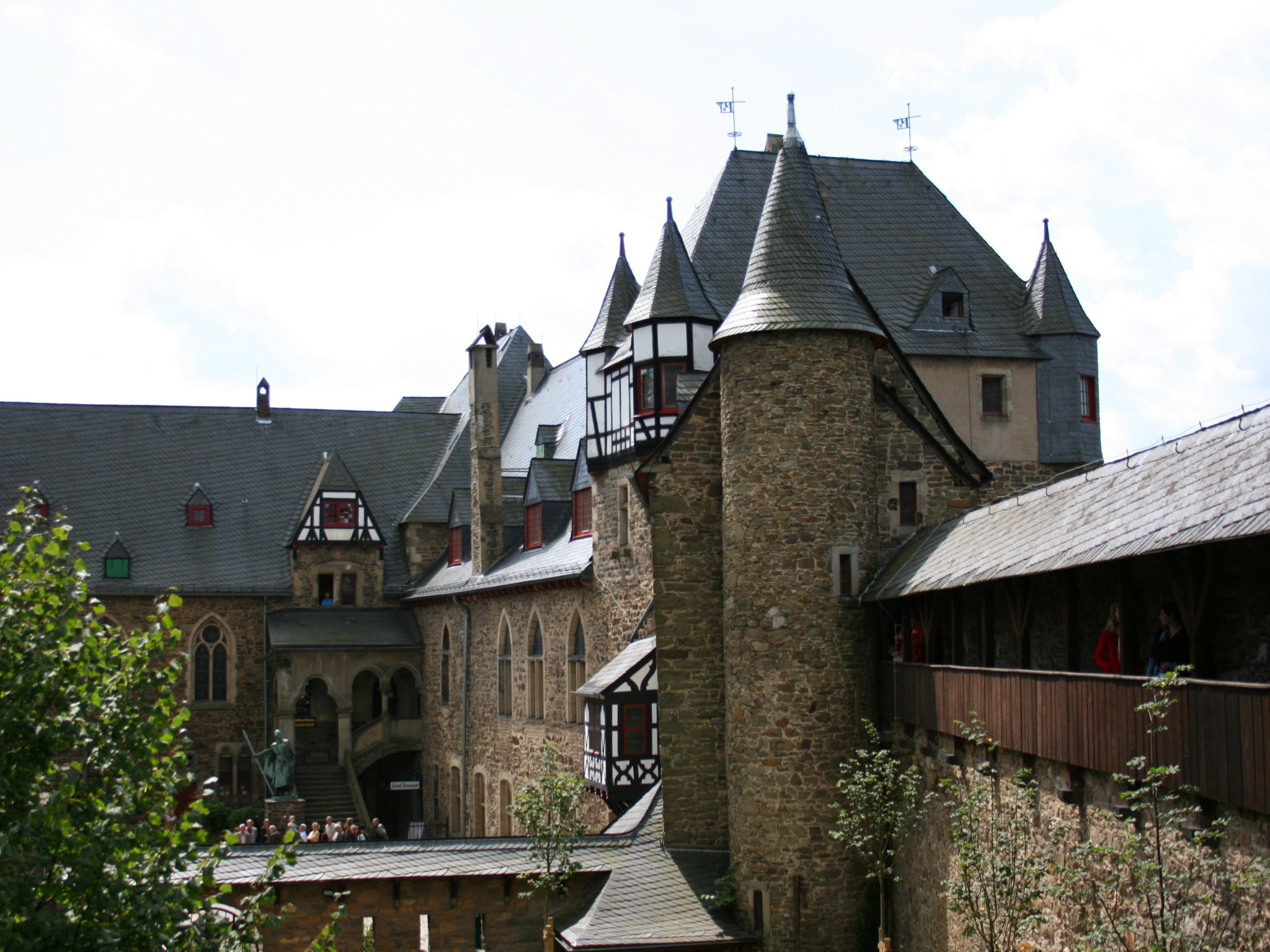
In 1133, Count Adolf II built Schloss Burg on a mountain over the river Wupper. It remained the main residence of the counts of Berg until the 14th century.

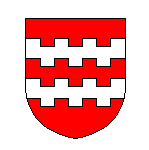
Ancient arms of the Counts of Berg.

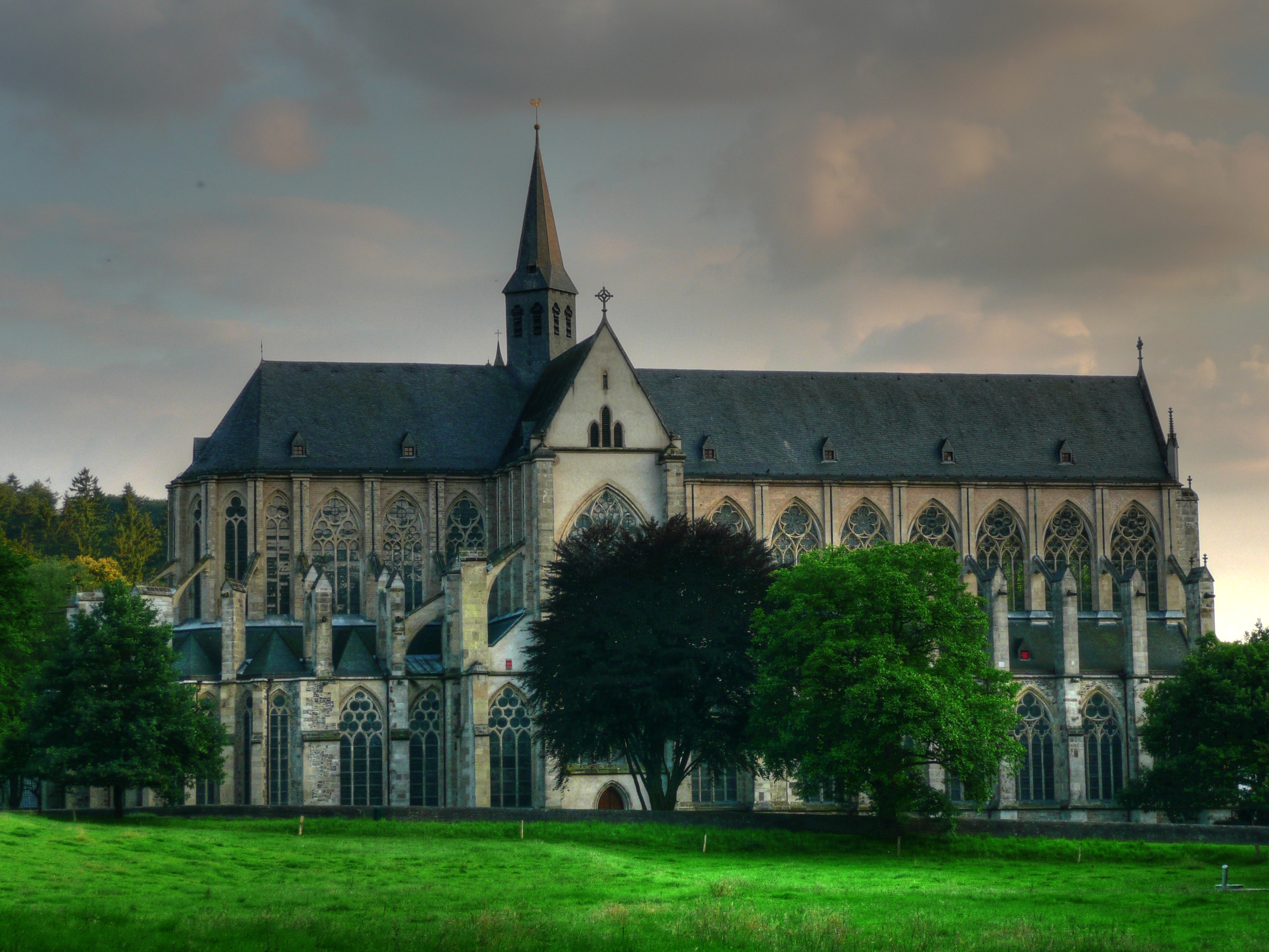
At the beginning of the 12th century Adolf II of Berg donated the site of their old ancestral castle, Schloss Berg, to Cistercian monks from Burgundy. Adolf IV later built the Altenberg Abbey.

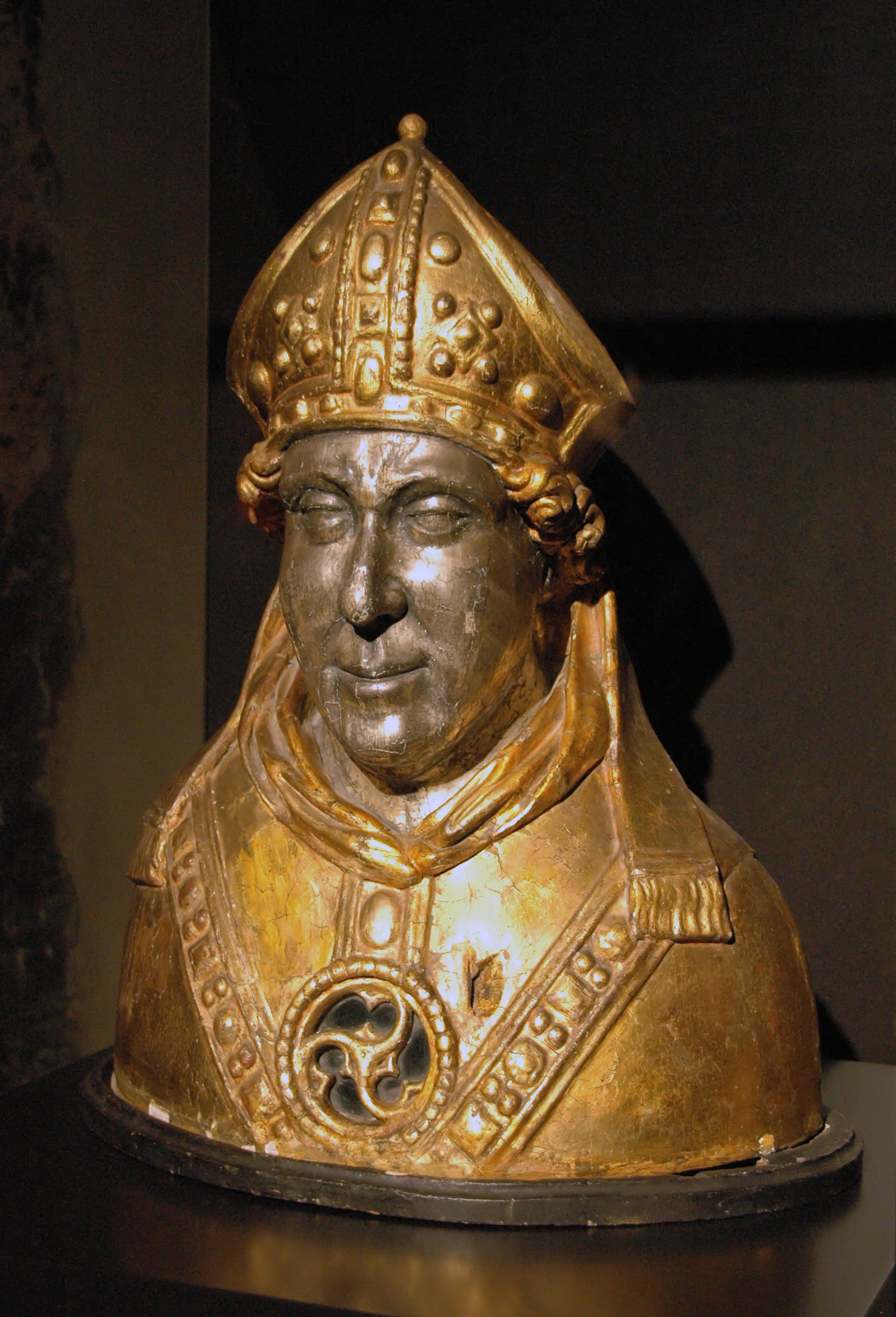
Bust containing the relics of St Engelbert of Cologne, Engelbert II of Berg, Archbishop of Cologne, imperial administrator and guardian of Henry VII of Germany, whom he crowned in 1222 as King of the Romans. It was said that despite his personal piety he was more of a monarch than a churchman.

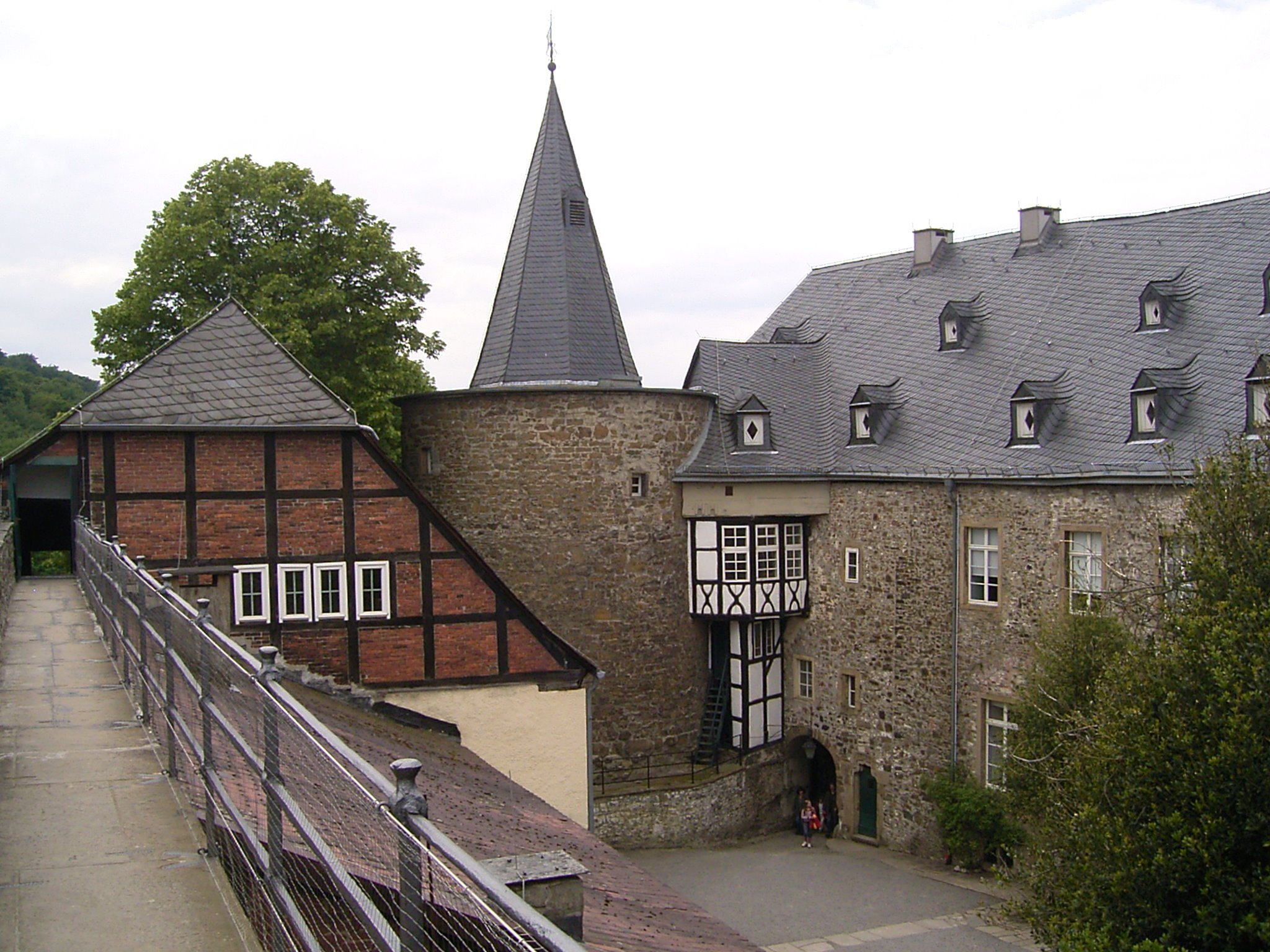
Count Dietrich von Altena-Isenberg, disinherited of all his territories following the execution of his father, fought to retrieve his paternal inheritance and built the castle of Limburg an der Lenne and took the title of Count of Limburg.

Along with the title of counts of Limburg, the Isenberg changed their arms from the rose of Isenberg to the lion of the Duke of Limburg. It is still used today by the Limburg Stirum. It is also present in the coat of arms of the Bentheim as they later took over the rule over the county of Limburg.

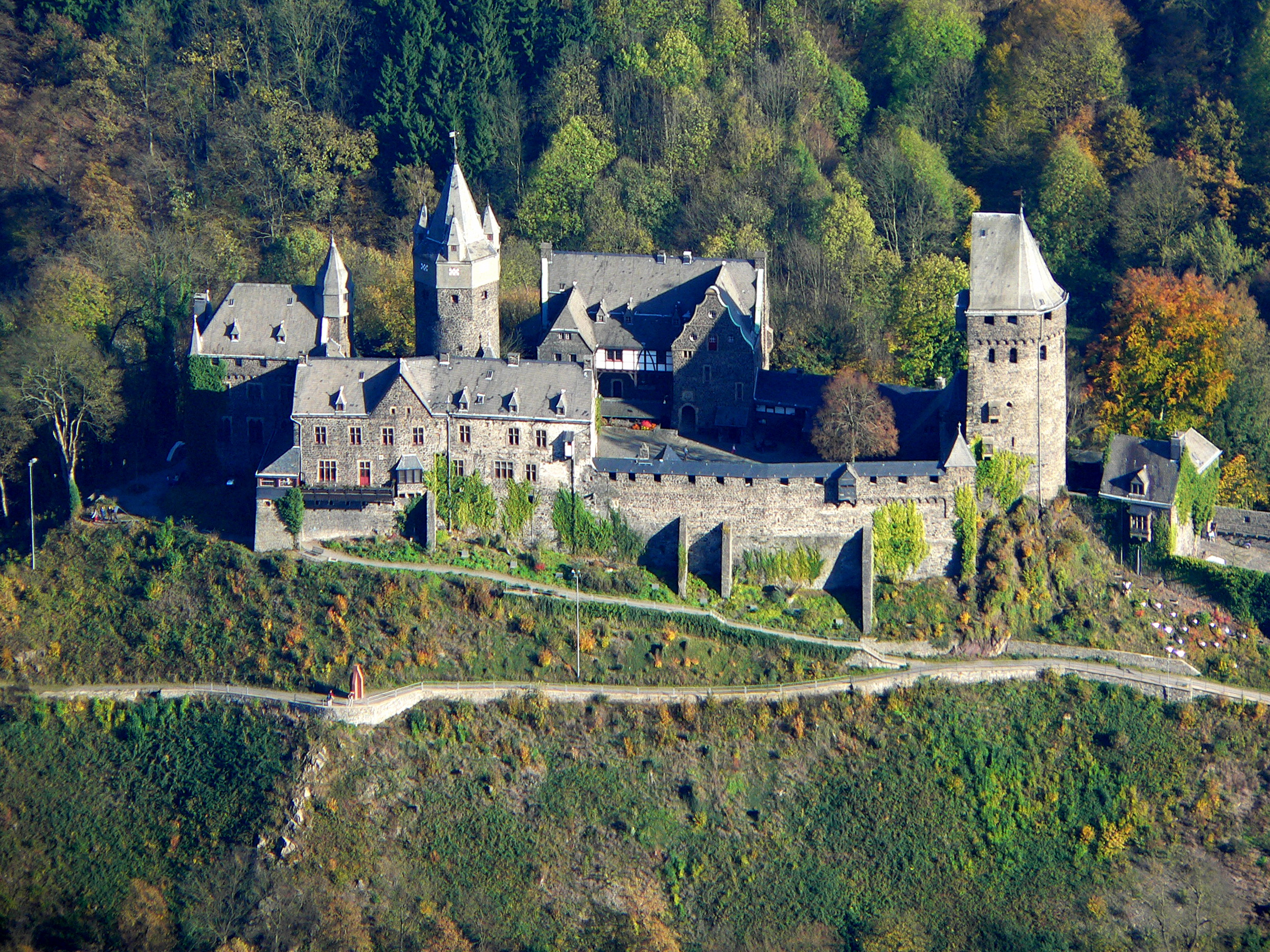
Count Frederick I of Altena purchased Schloss Mark near Hamm from the Edelherren of Rüdenberg and made it the residence of the new Counts of the Mark.

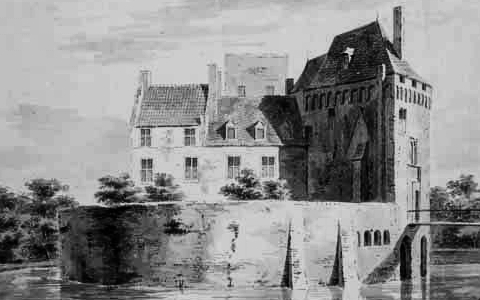
Count Georg of Limburg-Styrum acquired from his wife the county of Bronkhorst in 1539. It was ruled by the family until the 18th century.

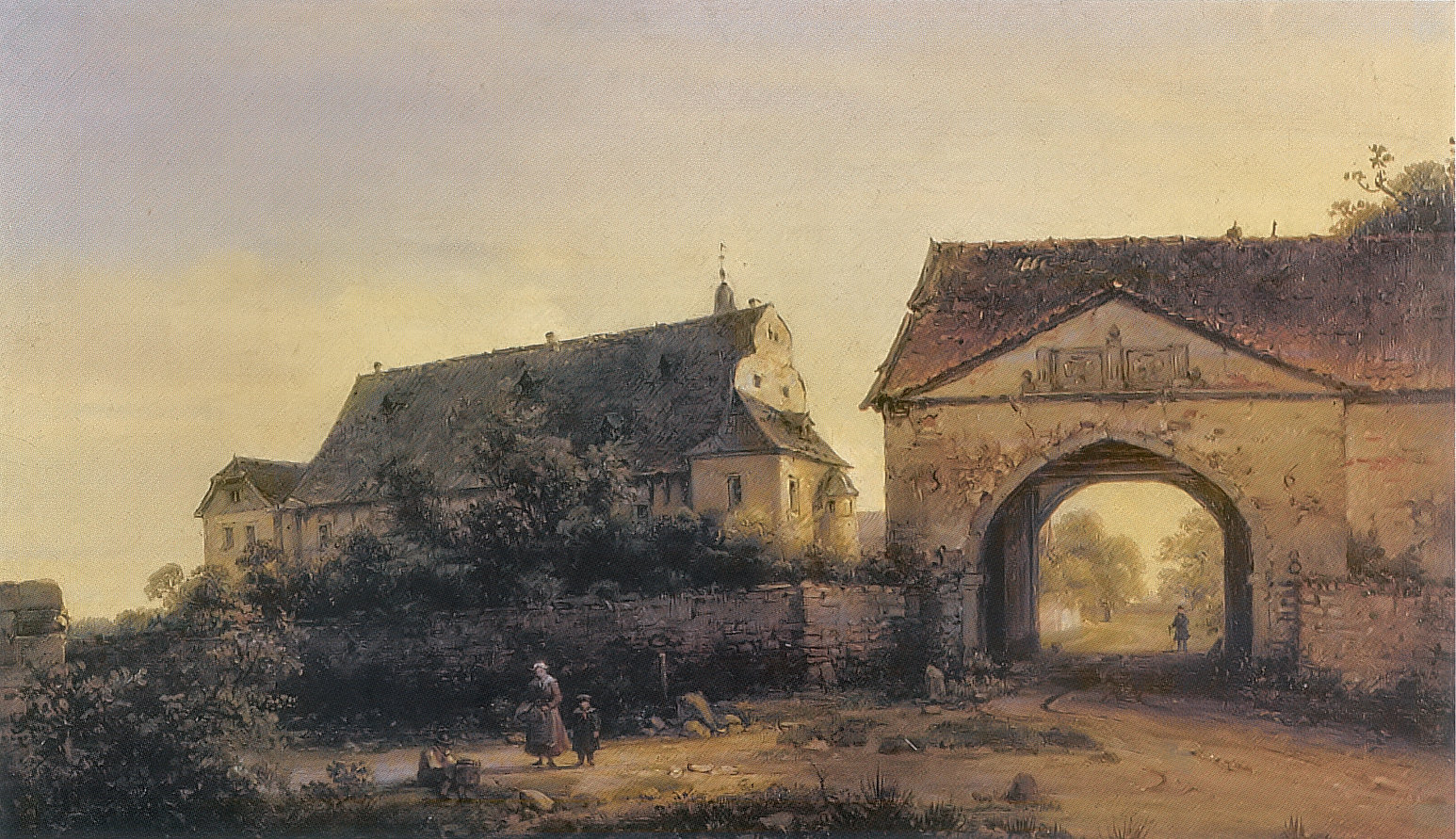
Schloss Styrum around 1840, by Domenico Quaglio the Younger (Städtisches Museum Mülheim an der Ruhr). After the murder of Archbishop Engelbert of Berg, the descendants of Frederick II of Isenberg gained ownership of the castle as Lords of Styrum. They founded the line of Counts of Limburg Styrum.

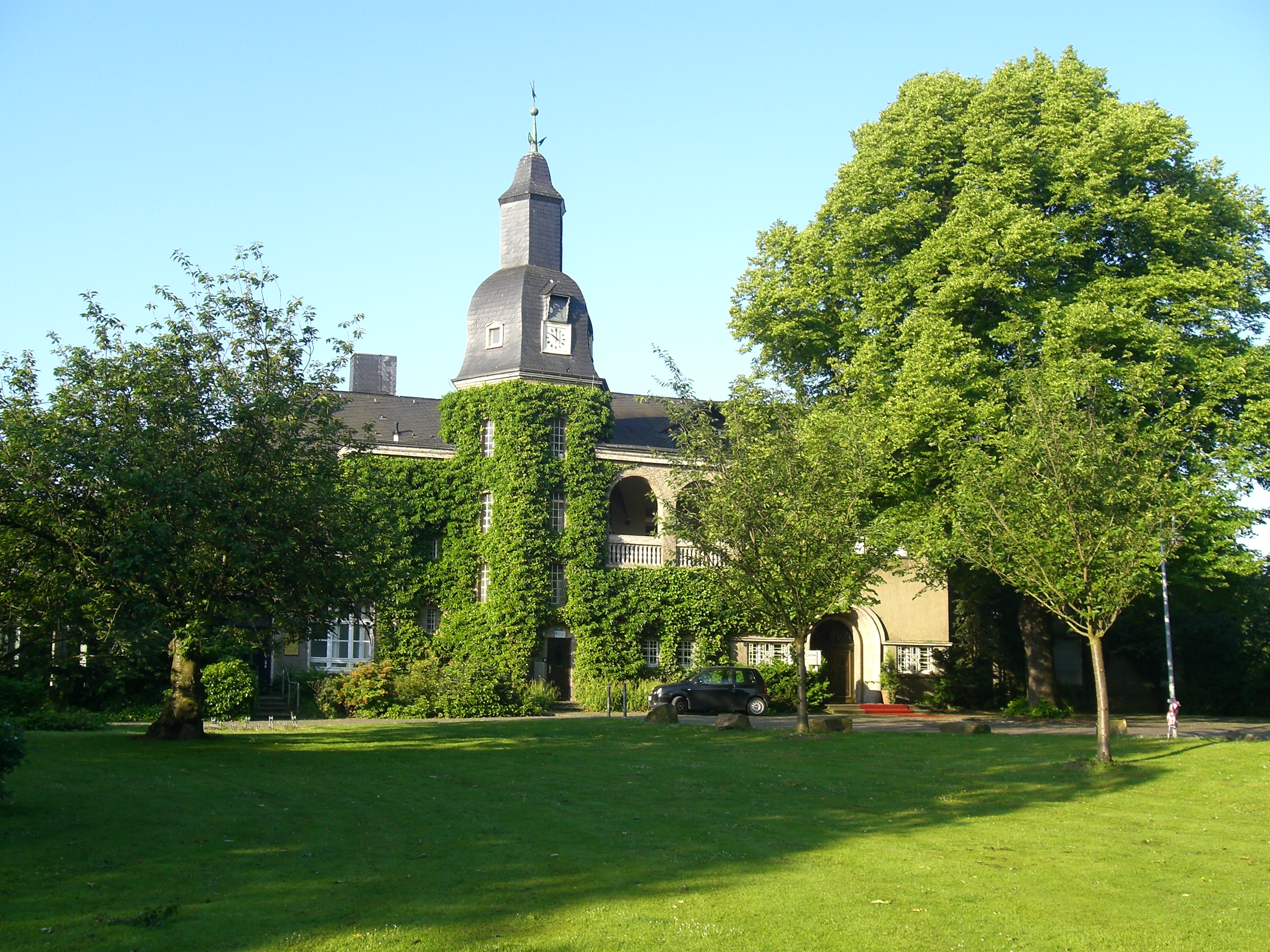
The castle of Styrum today, near Mülheim in Germany.

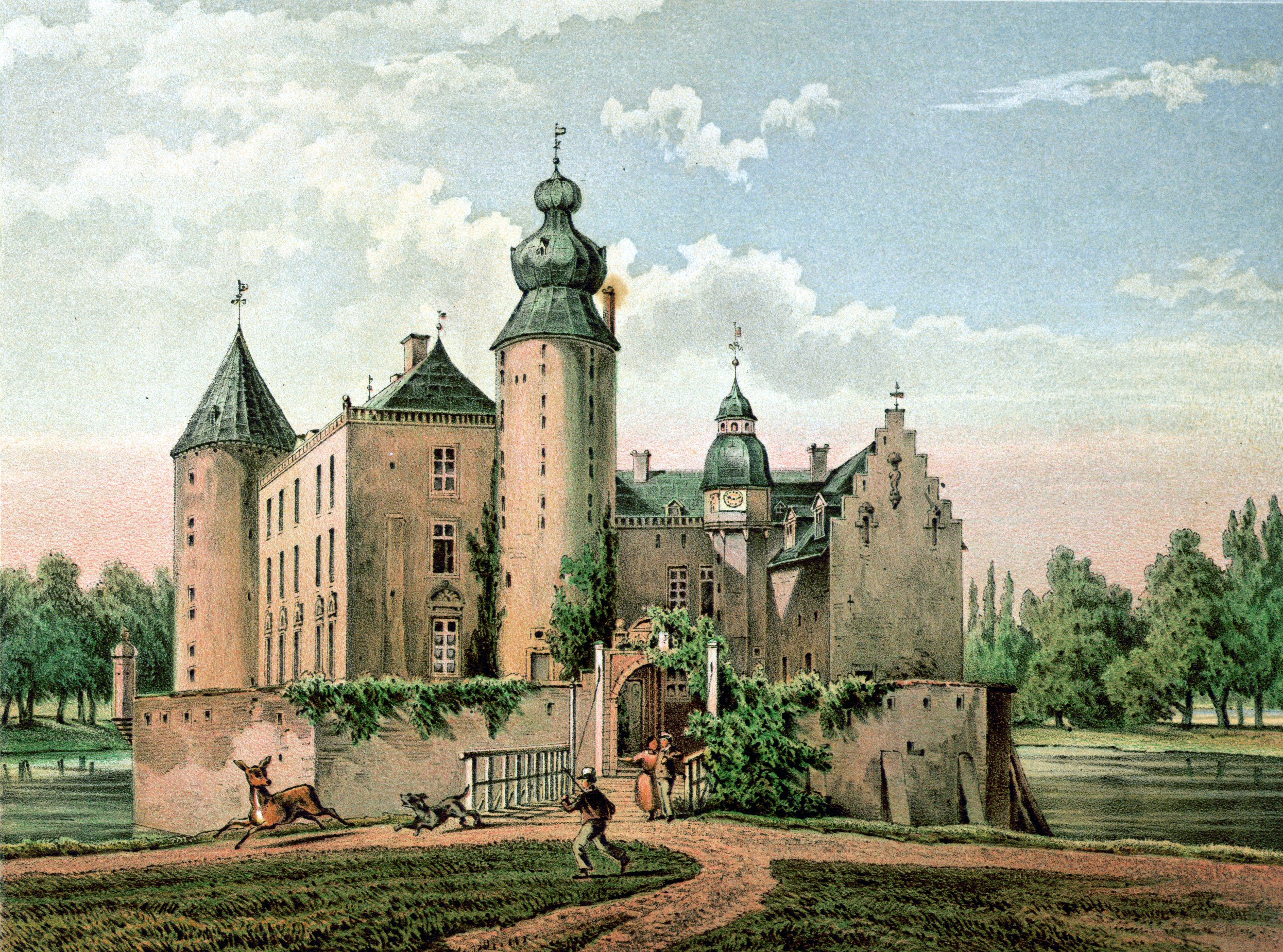
In 1640, the immediate lordship of Gemen passed for two centuries to the Counts of Limburg Stirum. In 1782, with extinction of Gemen branch of the House of Limburg Stirum, Gemen was inherited by the line of Limburg Stirum Iller-Aicheheim.

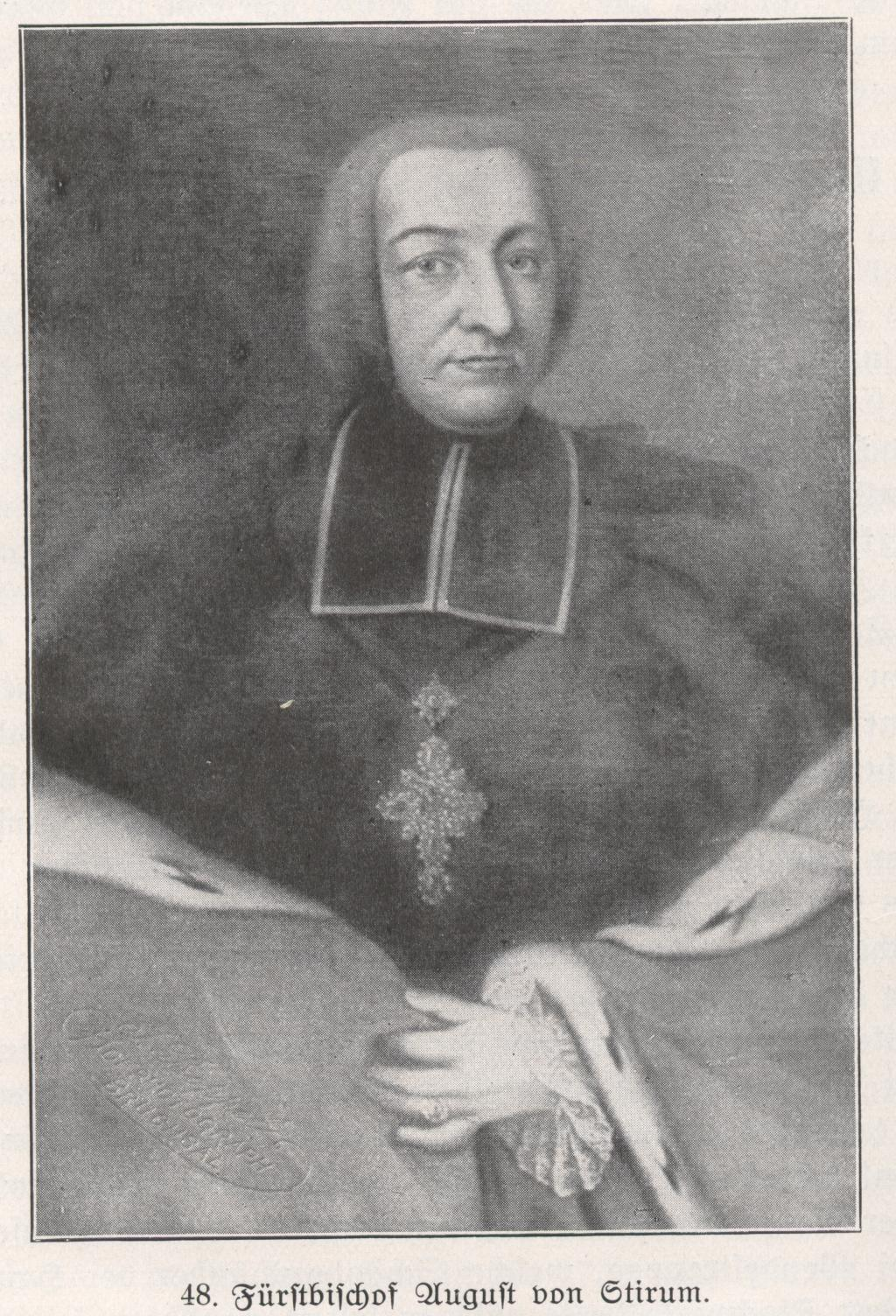
Fürstbischof August von Limburg Stirum was overthrown by the French revolutionary troops and died in exile in Freudenhain castle, near Passau, Germany.

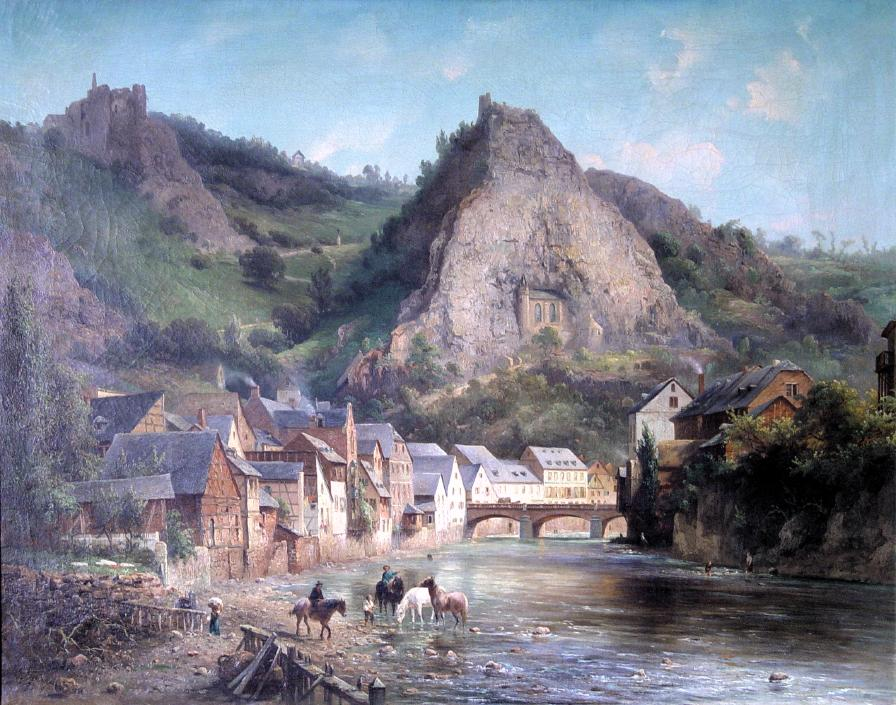
Oberstein was known as a gemstone centre, source for agate and jasper. It belonged to the Limburg Stirum until it was mediatized in 1801.

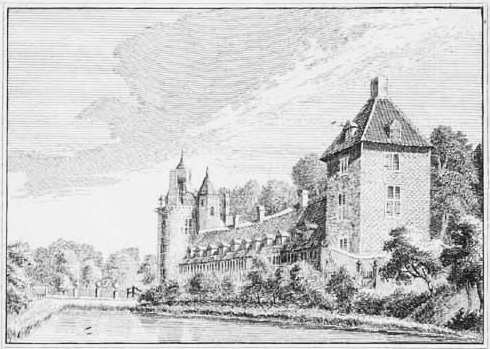
Castle of Wisch, in Gelderland, was inherited by the Limburg Stirum in the 16th century from Irmgard von Wisch, Countess von Bronckhorst.

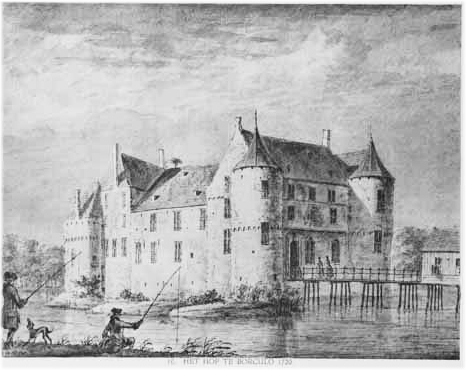
Ending a long succession dispute between the heirs of the last lords of Borculo, the Court of Gelders gave on 20 December 1615 the lordship of Borculo to Count Joost van Limburg and Bronkhorst.

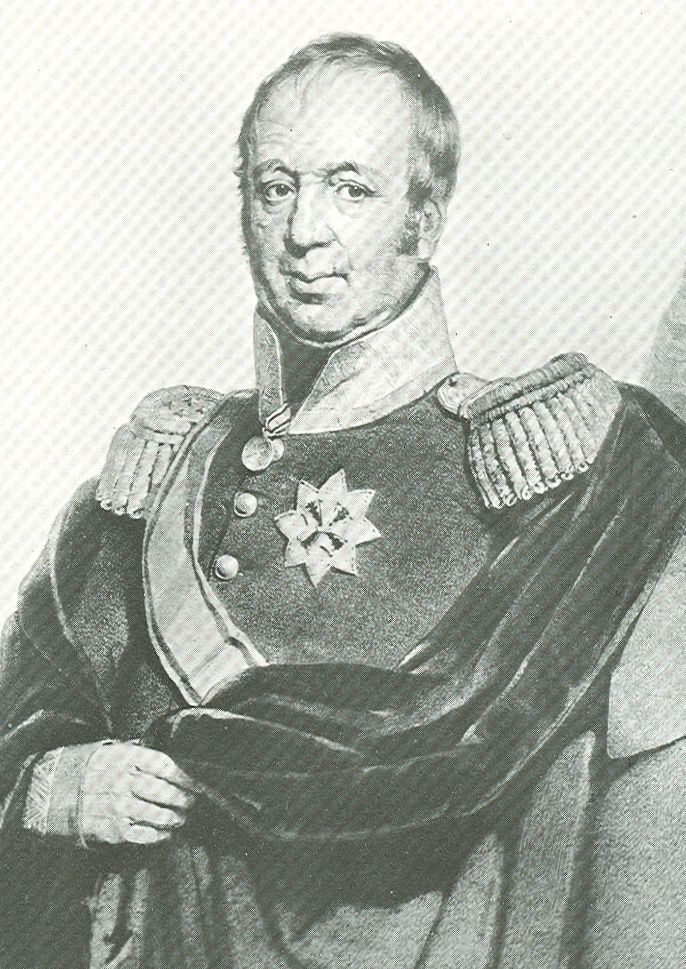
Leopold of Limburg Stirum (1758–1840), member of the Driemanschap of 1813 with Frans van der Duyn van Maasdam and Gijsbert van Hogendorp.

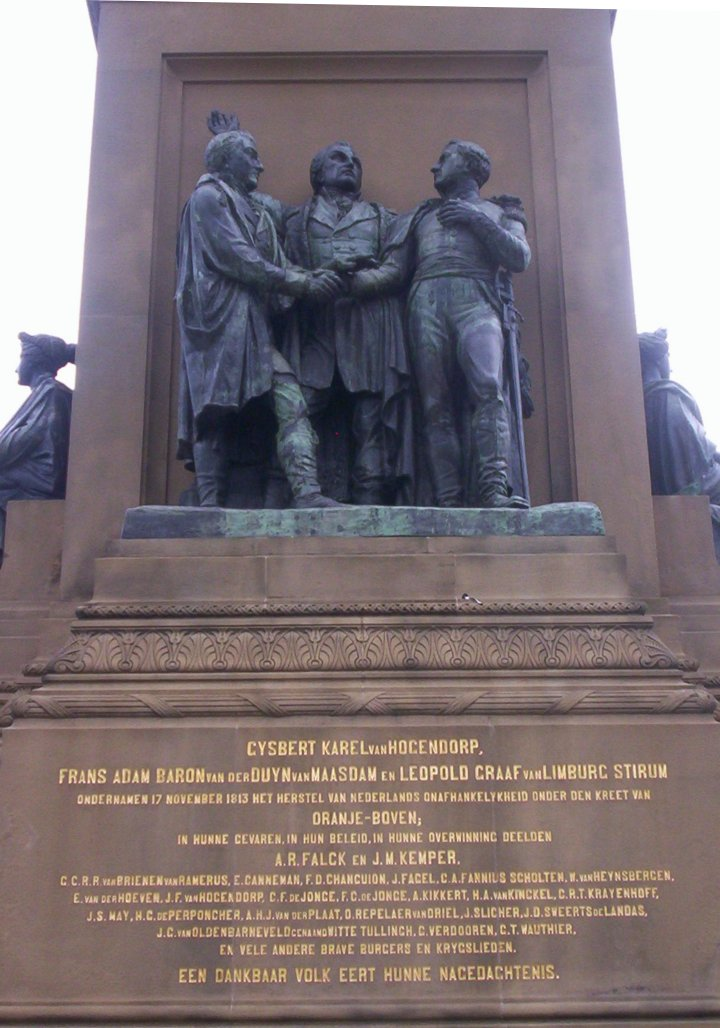
The monument to Leopold of Limburg Stirum, G.K. van Hogendorp and F.A. van der Duyn van Maasdam on the 1813 square in The Hague.

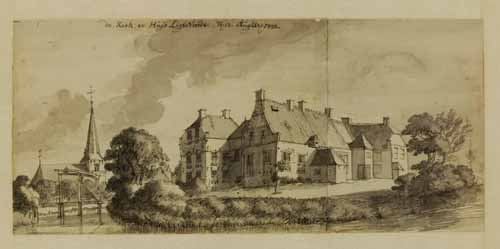
Castle of Lichtenvoorde, in Gelderland, Netherlands

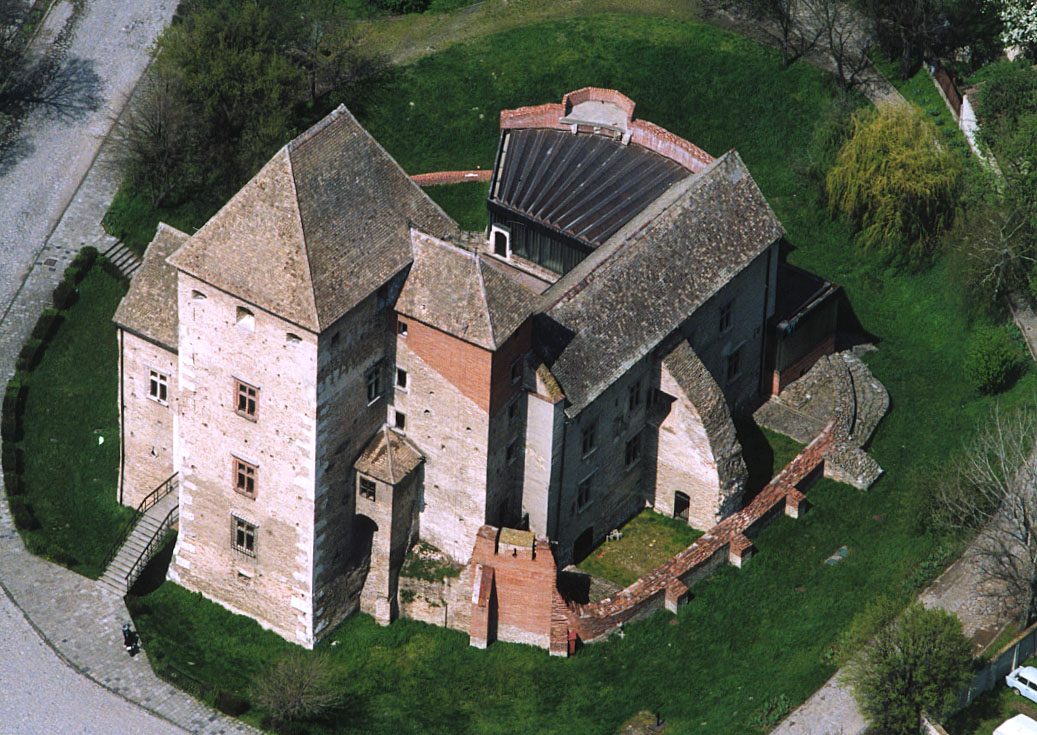
The castle fortress of Simontornya in Hungary was donated in the 1720s to the Limburg Styrum, but soon they built a new a castle, and turned the old one into a barn. The fortress was later inherited by the counts of Esterhazy.

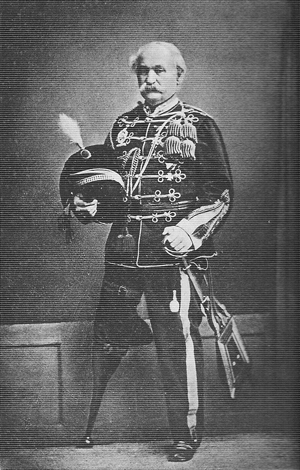
Menno van Limburg Stirum, as Minister of War, defended the suppression of military service in the Netherlands until he was sacked by the King who didn't share his view.

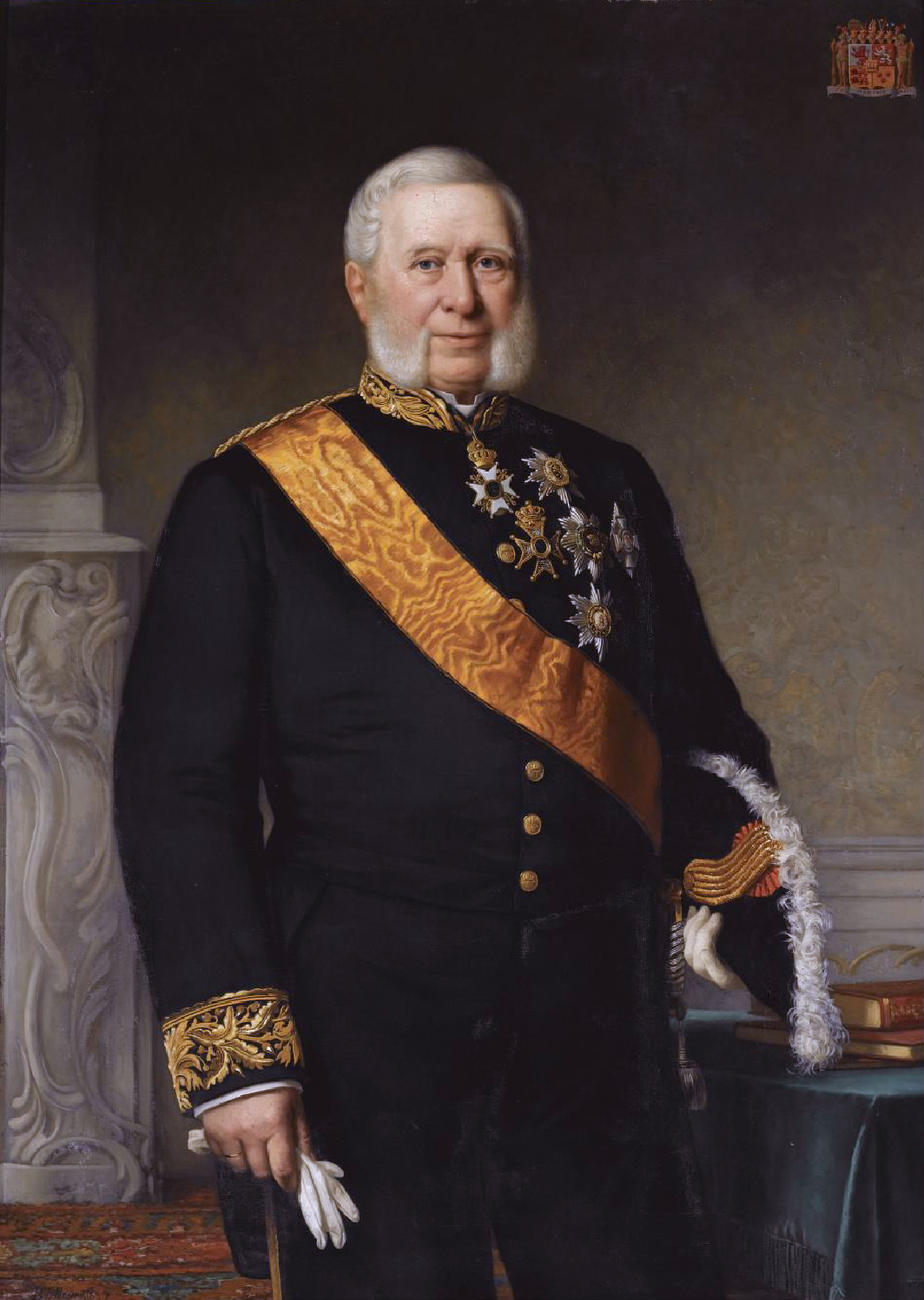
Louis Gaspard Adrien van Limburg Stirum, President of the Dutch Parliament in 1849 and Governor of Groningen and Gelderland.

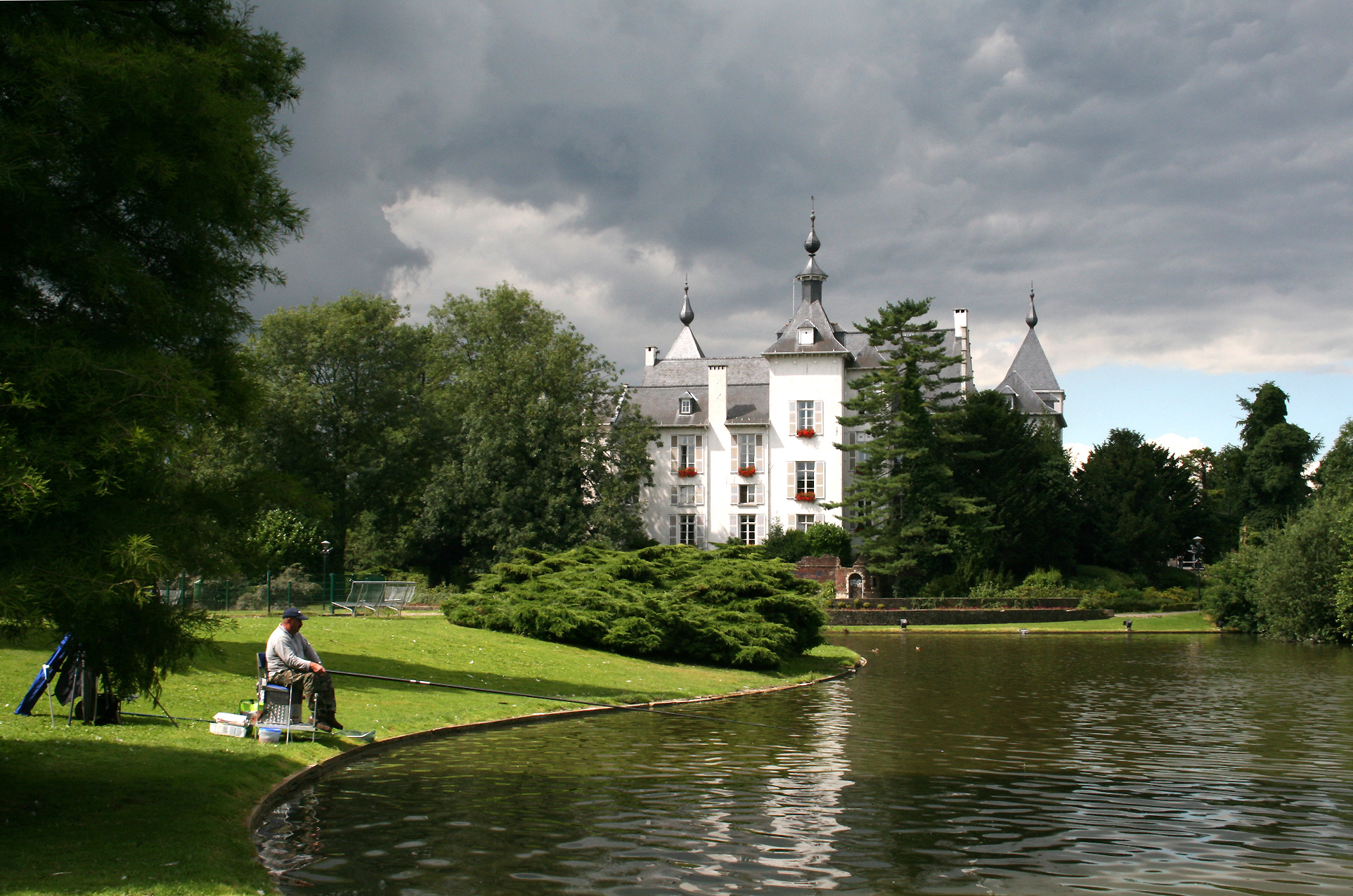
The castle of Wemmel was given by the Limburg Stirum to the municipality, and now serves as town hall.

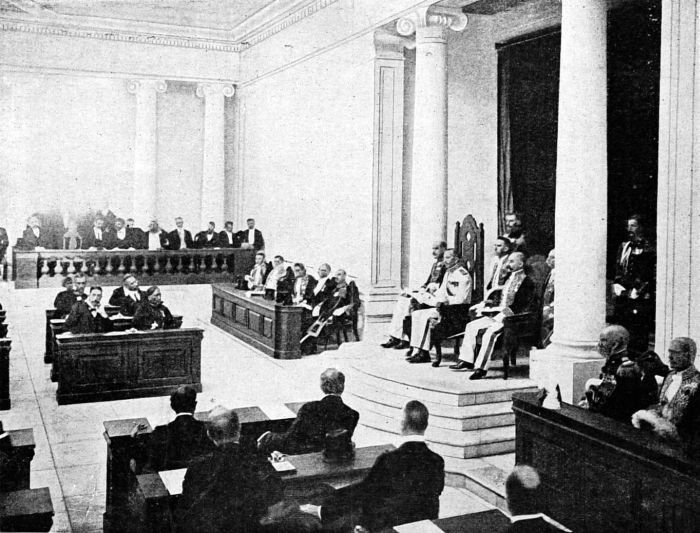
Opening of the Volksraad of the Dutch East Indies by Governor-General J.P. van Limburg Stirum in 1918.

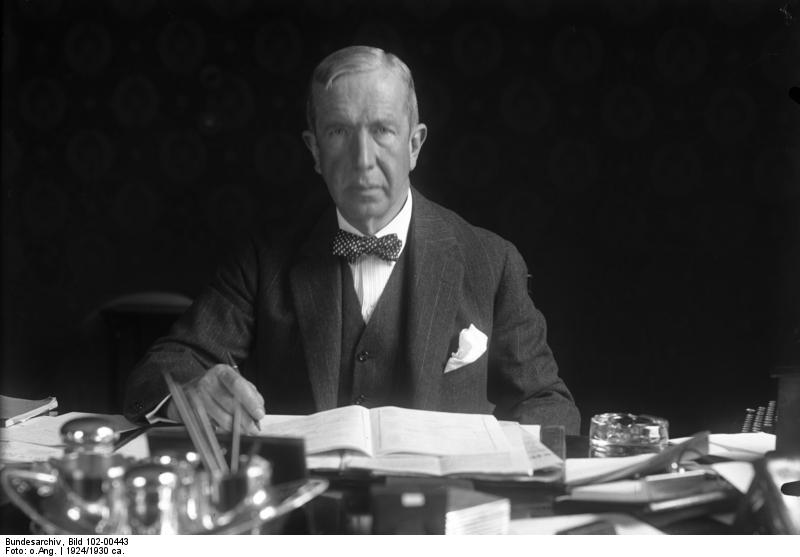
Johan Paul van Limburg Stirum, Dutch Ambassador to Germany in 1924

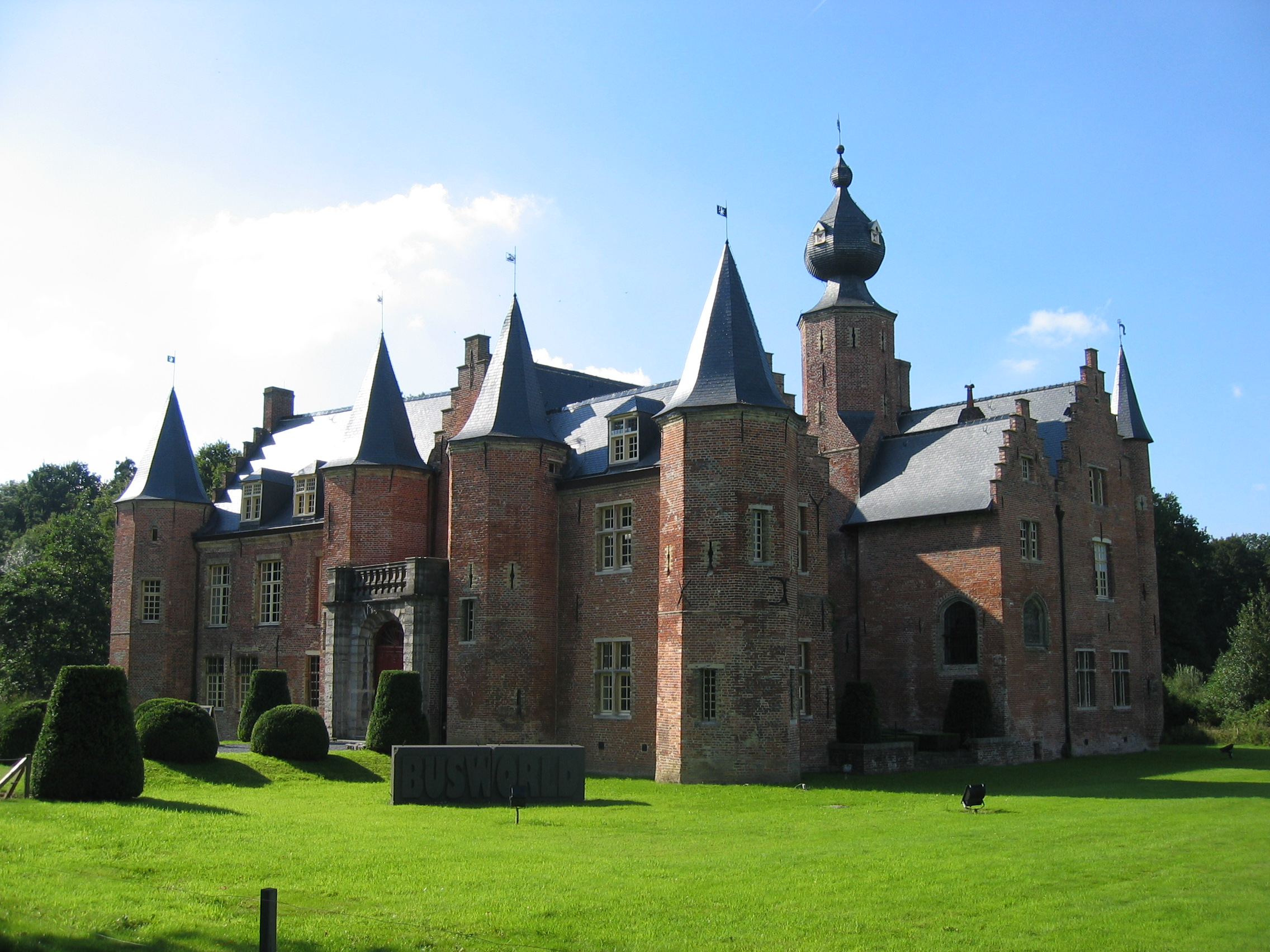
The castle of Rumbeke in Belgium was inherited by the Limburg Stirum from Marie Therese Countess de Thiennes, Leyenburg et de Rumbeke.

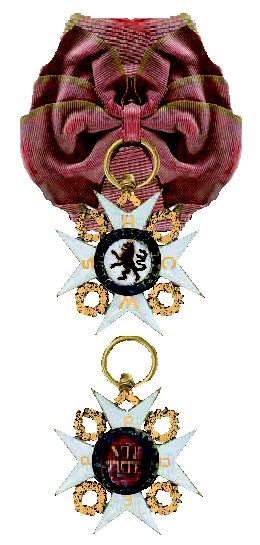
The Order of St Philip of the Lion of Limburg was created by the Limburg Stirum to reward persons of exceptional scientific, artistic or civil virtue.

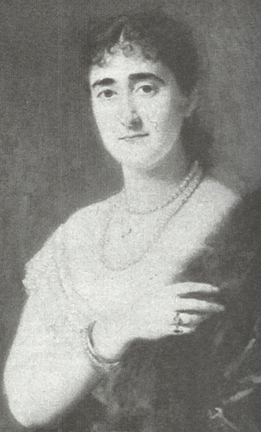
Mathilde of Limburg Stirum was the beloved of William, Prince of Orange. Their marriage was opposed by both King William III and Mathilde's father, Leopold van Limburg Stirum.

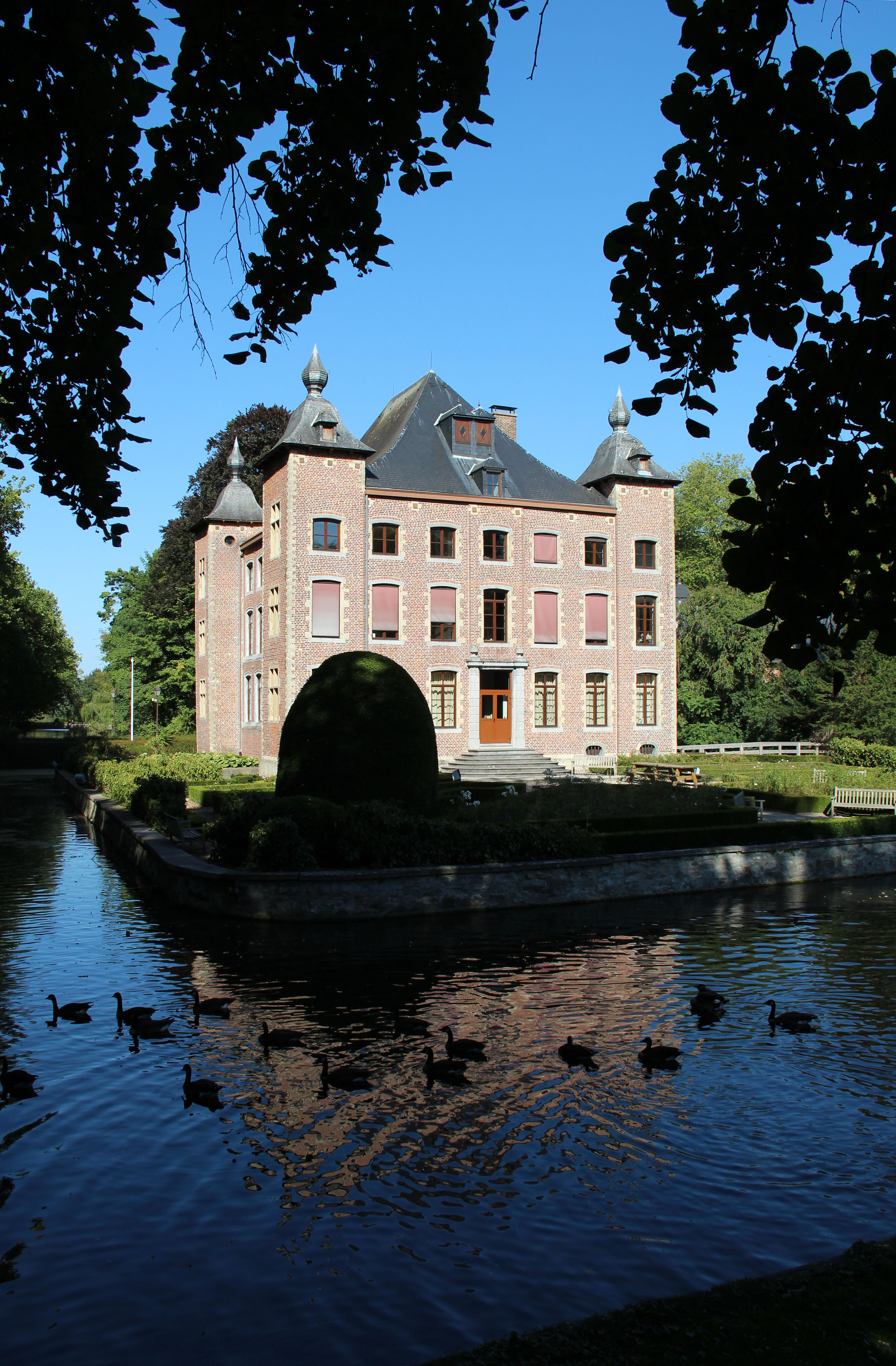
The Coloma castle in Sint-Pieters-Leeuw near Brussels dates from the 17th century. It was inherited by Albert de Limburg Stirum from the van der Dilft de Borghvliet family.

The current arms of the counts of Limburg Stirum display the arms of Berg/Limburg, Bronckhorst, Borculo, Wisch and Gemen.

Coat of arms of Berg, then Limburg. Also used by the provinces of Limburg (Belgium) and Limburg (Netherlands).

Coat of arms of Bronckhorst

Coat of arms of Wisch

Coat of arms of Borculo

Arms of Limburg Stirum

Coat of arms of the immediate lordship of Gemen, mediatized in 1806.

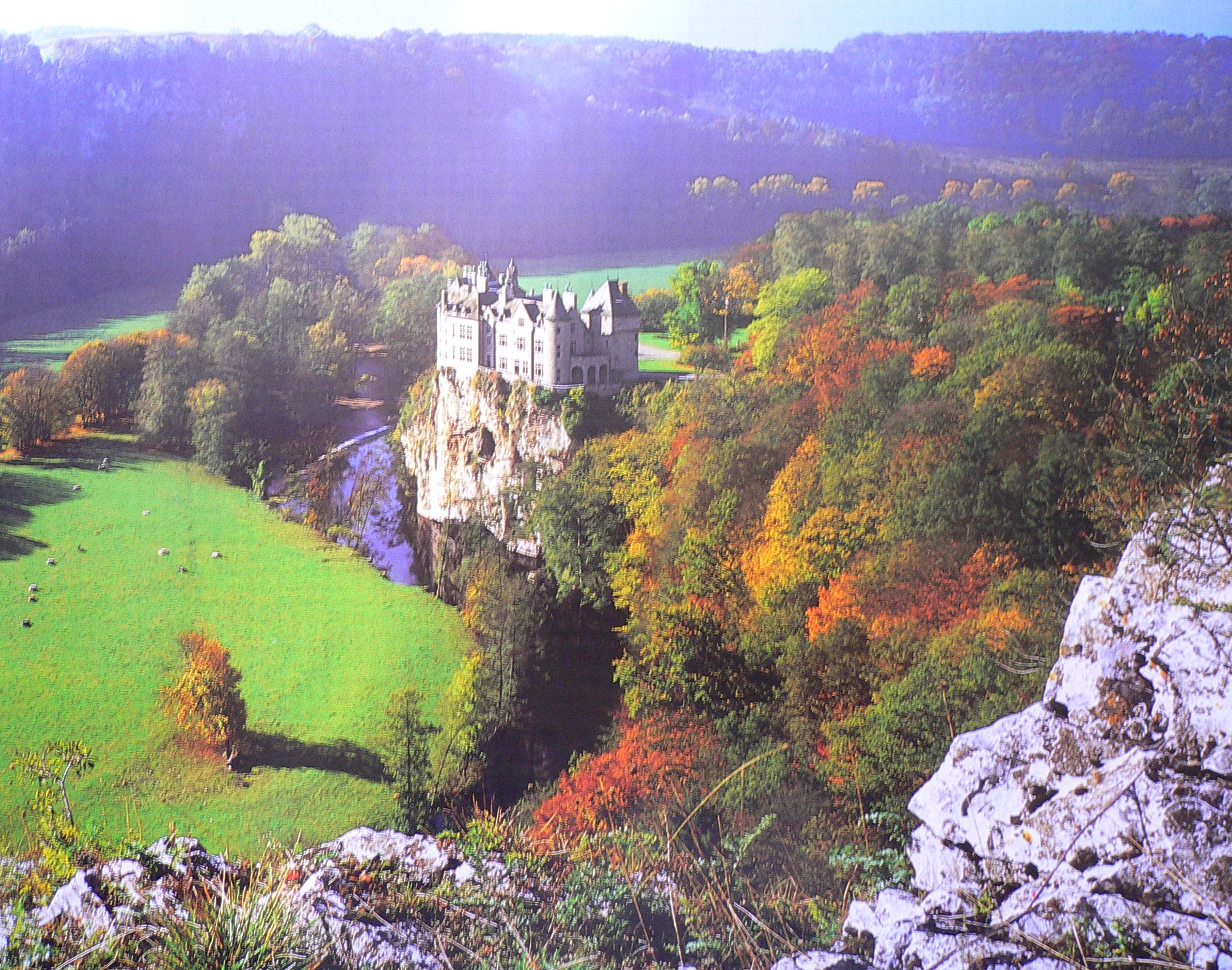
The castle of Walzin in Belgium belongs to Count Alexis de Limburg Stirum.

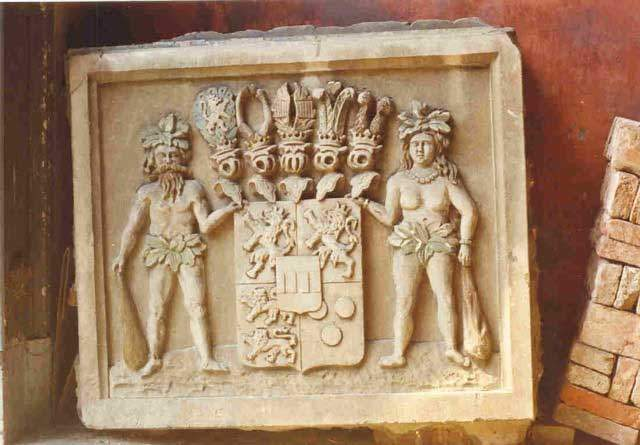
The House's coat of arm, as found in the stable at one of the family's estate in the Netherlands.

== See also ==
- Belgian nobility

== Literature ==
- Genealogische Handbuch des Adels, Gräfliche Häuser A Band II, 1955;
- W. Gf v. Limburg Stirum, "Stamtafel der Graven van Limburg Stirum", 's Gravenhage 1878;
- A.M.H.J. Stokvis, "Manuel d'Histoire, de Genealogie et de Chronologie de tous les États du Globe", Tome III, Leiden 1890–93;
- W. K. Prins v. Isenburg, "Stammtafeln zur Geschichte der Europaischen Staaten", 2. Aufl., Marburg/Lahn, 1953.
