= Adolf II =

Adolf II may refer to:

- Adolf II of Lotharingia (1002–1041)
- Adolf II of Berg (died 1090/1106)
- Adolf II of Holstein (c. 1128–1164)
- Adolf II of Waldeck (c. 1250–1302)
- Adolf II (bishop of Liège) (1288–1344)
- Adolf II of the Marck (died 1347)
- Adolf II von Nassau (c. 1423–1475)
- Adolf II, Duke of Guelders (1438–1477)
- Adolf II, Prince of Schaumburg-Lippe (1883–1936)
- Adolphus Frederick II, Duke of Mecklenburg-Strelitz (1658–1708)
