= Adolf I of Lotharingia =

- Count of Keldachgau
- Other titles: Vogt of Deutz
- Noble family: Ezzonids
- Issue: Hermann III; Adolf II of Lotharingia; Erenfried
- Father: Hermann I

Adolf I of Lotharingia, count of Keldachgau, Vogt of Deutz from 1008 until 1018, was the son of Hermann I "Pusillus" (the Little Pfalzgraf), count palatine of Lotharingia. He left three sons:

- Hermann III, Vogt of Deutz in St. Severin (Cologne) und Werden (died 1056);
- Adolf II of Lotharingia, count of Keldachgau, Vogt of Deutz (born 1002, died 1041);
- Erenfried, Probst of St. Severin.
