= Adolf II of Lotharingia =

- Count of Keldachgau
- Other titles: Vogt of Deutz
- Born: c. 1002
- Died: 1041 (aged 38–39)
- Noble family: Ezzonids
- Issue: Adolf I of Berg; Hermann IV
- Father: Adolf I of Lotharingia

Adolf II of Lotharingia (c. 1002–1041) was count in Keldachgau and Vogt of Deutz, and was the son of Adolf I of Lotharingia, count in Keldachgau, Vogt of Deutz. He left two sons:

- Adolf I of Berg (b. before 1041, died 1086), count of Berg from 1077 until 1082, Vogt of Werden, Deutz, Berg and Gerresheim;
- Hermann IV (de)(b. before 1041, died 1091), count of Saffenberg and Nörvenich, Vogt of Cornelimünster und St. Martin in Cologne.

His ancestor Herman II lord of Saffenberg is supposedly the son of Herman I of Lothringen and his brother is Steffan Saffenberg (abbot of Prüm 993-1001).

== Sources ==
- Lewald, Ursula, 'Die Ezzonen. Das Schicksal eines rheinischen Fürstengeschlechts', Rheinische Vierteljahrsblätter 43 (1979) pp. 120-168.
- Kimpen, E., ‘Ezzonen und Hezeliniden in der rheinischen Pfalzgrafschaft’, Mitteilungen des Österreichischen Instituts für Geschichtsforschung. XII. Erg.-Band. (Innsbruck, 1933) pp. 1–91.
- Gerstner, Ruth, 'Die Geschichte der lothringischen Pfalzgrafschaft (von den Anfängen bis zur Ausbildung des Kurterritoriums Pfalz)', Rheinisches Archiv 40 (Bonn, 1941)
- Friedrich Wilhelm Oedinger (arrangement): The Regests of the Archbishops of Cologne I (313-1099), Bonn 1954-1960
- Droege, G., 'Pfalzgrafschaft, Grafschaften und allodiale Herrschaften zwischen Maas und Rhein in salisch-staufischer Zeit’, Rheinische Vierteljahrsblätter 26 (1961), pp. 1–21.
- Wisplinghoff, E., 'Zur Reihenfolge der lothringischen Pfalzgrafen am Ende des 11. Jahrhunderts’, in Rheinische Vierteljahrsblätter 28 (1963) pp. 290–293.
- Steinbach, F., ‘Die Ezzonen. Ein Versuch territorialpolitischen Zusammenschlusses der fränkischen Rheinlande’, in Collectanea Franz Steinbach. Aufsätze und Abhandlungen zur Verfassungs-, Sozial- und Wirtschaftsgeschichte, geschichtlichen Landeskunde und Kulturraumforschung, ed. F. Petri & G. Droege (Bonn, 1967) pp. 64–81.
- Stefan Weinfurter / Odilo Engels : Series Episcoporum Ecclesiae Catholicae Occidentalis V.1, Stuttgart 1984
- Reuter, Timothy, 'Germany in the Early Middle Ages 800–1056', New York: Longman, 1991.
- Bernhardt, John W. (2002). Itinerant Kingshiop & Royal Monasteries in Early Medieval Germany, c.936-1075. Cambridge University Press.

== See also ==
- Duchy of Berg
- Ezzonids
