= Counts of Limburg Hohenlimburg and Broich =

Limburg-Hohenlimburg-Broich
- Coat of Arms
- Parent house: Ezzonen, House of Berg
- Country: Holy Roman Empire
- Founded: 13th century as Counts of Limburg (Lenne)
- Founder: Diederick I, Count of Limburg
- Final ruler: Johan II, Count of Limburg-Hohenlimburg-Broich
- Titles: German Imperial Counts
- Estates: County of Berg, Altena, Isenberg, County of Limburg, Broich.

The house of Limburg Hohenlimburg (later Limburg-Hohenlimburg-Broich) took its name in the 12th century from the county of Limburg on the river Lenne in today's Germany. After Diederick of Isenberg had claimed part of the former property of his father Frederik of Isenberg with the help of uncle Duke Hendrik of Limburg, he built the Hohenlimburg castle on the river Lenne. At fifty years of age, his third son Everhart, closest descendant of the original holder, succeeded him in the county. Mentioned count, in original kept charters, since 1276 together with his father. It was clear that the future male-line primogeniture was granted. Everhard is the ancestor of the family branch of the counts of Limburg Hohenlimburg and Broich. His first brother Henry (1241 -1243) died young and second Johan (1247–1277), died at the age of thirty, left three children. Johan is the ancestor of the house Lords of Limburg Stirum. The Counts of Limburg Hohenlimburg and Broich were not count by name with a late 17th century certified title but actually ruled the county of Limburg-Lenne since the 13th century, until the first quarter of the 16th century. The last count Johan (1464–1511) who had no descendants of his own. None of his only two male relatives, cousins Diederick and Adolf of Limburg, sons of his former godfather Johan of Limburg (1421–1472), had inheritance rights, as explained below. To prevent the family of his former wife Von Neuenahr from taking the county, Count Johan adopted his cousin Irmgard of Sayn at her marriage to Winrich of Daun. She and her husband inherited the county.

== Position in Early Middle Ages ==
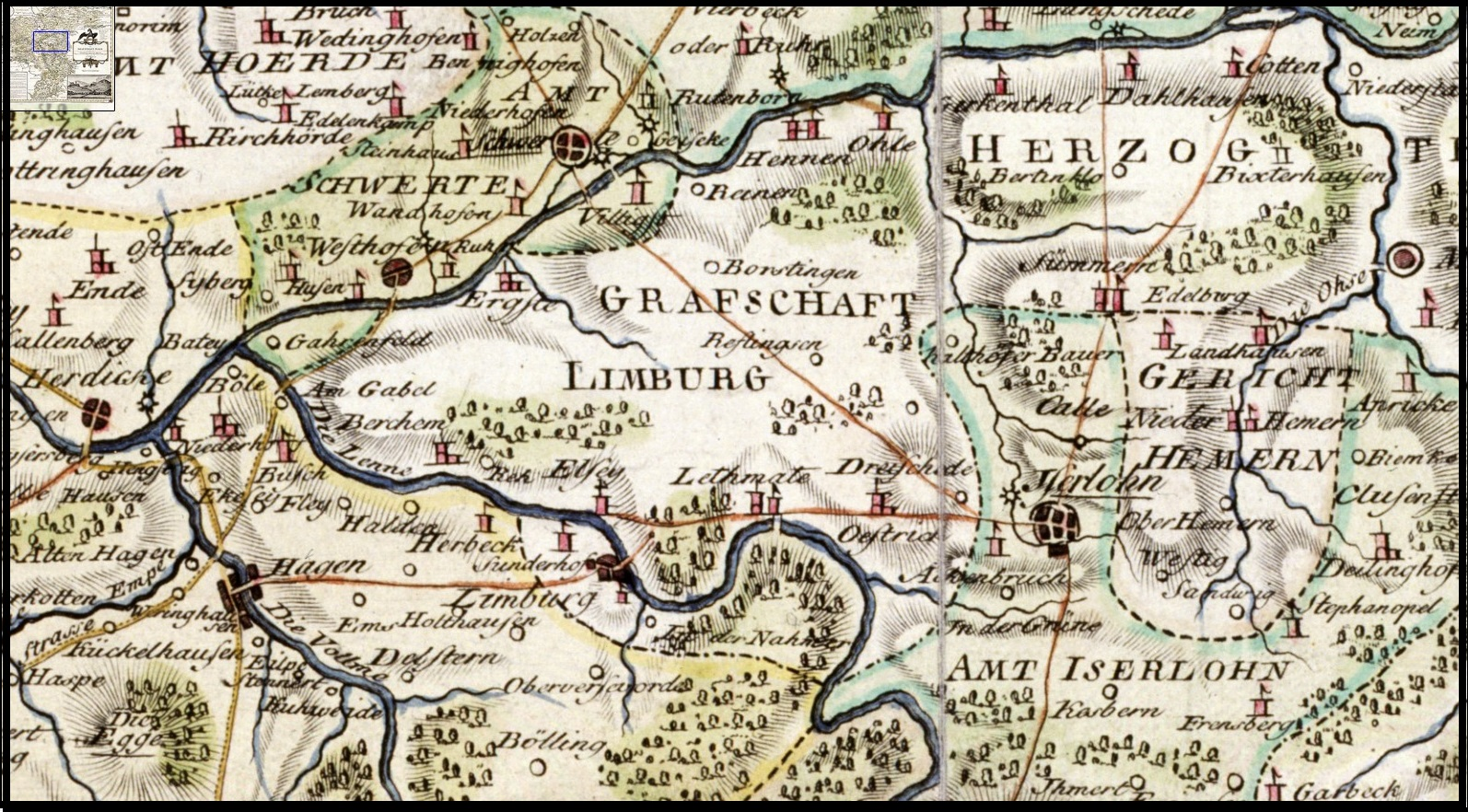
County Limburg on the river Lenne

The former counts of Limburg were a branch of the House of Berg, which was among the most powerful dynasties in the region of the lower Rhine during the Early Middle Ages. Historians by name among others Oedinger, Lewald, Kimpen, Rudiger link this House to "Hermann II(I) Pusillius (945–996)" heir of an even older dynasty, the Ezzonen, going back to the 9th century. Since the 9th century, the house of Limburg Hohenlimburg counted five Counts Palatine of Lothringia, several Dukes of Westphalia, Bavaria, Carinthia and Swabia, seven Archbishops of Cologne, one Prince-Bishop of Speyer, more than ten bishops in the Holy Roman Empire, and at least two saints of the Catholic Church. The territorial authority of the family, (counts of Berg since 1077), next counts of Altena and Isenberg and then since 1246 counts of Limburg, was significantly reduced following the opposition of Frederick II, count of Isenberg to the aggression of his cousin, the Archbishop of Cologne, Engelbert II of Berg. Leading to the murder of the latter. The other branch, the counts of the Marck, later rose in importance as dukes of Cleves, Jülich and Berg, dukes of Nevers and Bouillon, counts of Schleiden, etc.

== The Ezzonian Dynasty ==
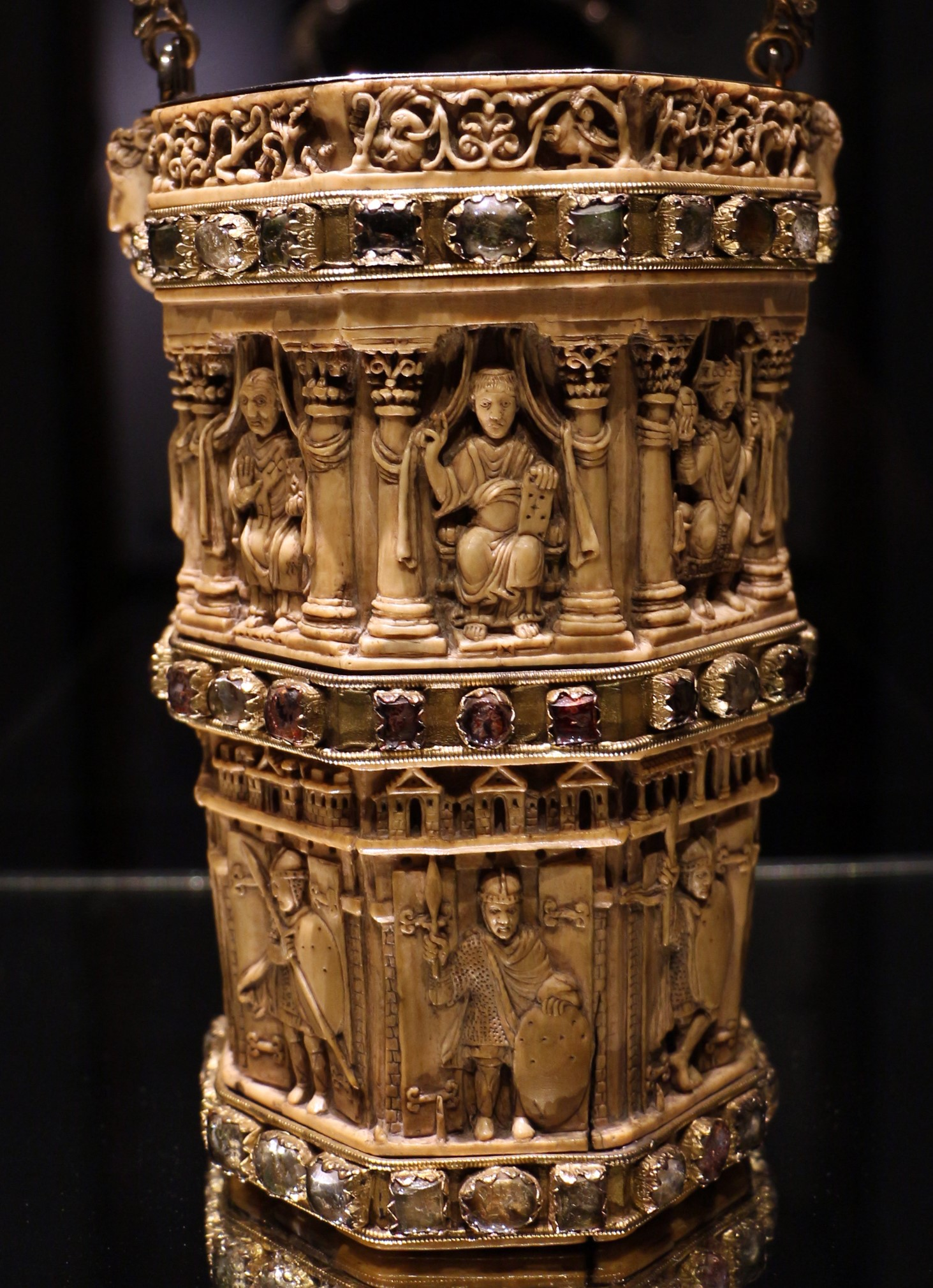
Erenfried with the holy Mauritius lance, (bottom right with lance protruding above) on ivory holy water vessel dated 1000. Aachen Cathedral Treasury

The Ezzonen appear in the chronicles with Erenfried I.(866–904), count of the Bliesgau, Keldachgau and Bonngau. Erenfried I. married Adelgunde daughter of Konrad II of Burgondy and Jutta of Friaul. He had Carolingian ancestors along the female line since Jutta von Friaul was the daughter of Gisela (820–874) sister of king Charles the Bold. The Ezzonian dynasty (named after Count Palatine Ezzo) were the Counts Palatine of Lotharingia during the 10th and 11th centuries. They were important in governance of the region of the Middle and Lower Rhine. In spite of their military accomplishments in favour of the German emperors, the Ezzonians did not succeed in building a territorial entity in Lotharingia. During a limited period, they were, however, assigned the duchies of Swabia, Bavaria and Carinthia. Eberhart I. Propinqus of king Hendrik I, was count of the Keldacha and Bonngau. Mentioned in charters 904–937. As son of Erenfried I, he followed his father and married a daughter of Herman II count of the Wertigau, among others "Vogt of the Abby of Werden". (The later Count Frederik of Isenberg, who dies in 1226, inherited part of this guardianship of the abbey of Werden and of the abbey of Essen). Erenfried II., the second son of Eberhard I, called after his grandfather, was count of the Zulpichau, Bonngau, Keldachau, Tubalgau and Ruhrgau. Mentioned in charters 942–972. He married Richwarda of Burgondy and Tenois. Their son Hermann II followed.

== The Keldachgau ==
Hermann II, also known as Pusillus, Count Palatine of Lothringen, was count of the Auelgau, Bonngau, Keldacha and Zulpichgau. He fought in the battle of Lechfeld 955. Pusilus, married around 985 for the second time N.N. and died 16 July 996. Two sons are known from that marriage, Herman (III), Count of Keldachgau and Adolf I, defensor Tuitiensis guardian of Deutz. Both mentioned in charters between 1003 and 1041. Adolf I, fifth and youngest son of Herman II was also mentioned Advocadus. On the river Duhn, in the middle of the former Ezzoner Keldachgau, about 30 km east of Cologne, Adolf built castle Berg near today's Altenberg. He was the youngest (half-brother) of Ezzo, founder of Brauweiler Abbey, who was brother-in-law of Emperor Otto III, married to Mathilde. She was brought up by her older niece Abbess of the monastery of Essen, who also named Mathilde . The famous Mathilde cross, kept in the Abbey Essen, is a reminder of her. Adolf in turn was a brother-in-law of the youngest Mathilde, Abbess of Essen. The Ezzoner Adolf I is the direct ancestor of the later Counts and Dukes of Berg. He was followed by his son Adolf II mentioned in charters in 1041, count in the Keldagau en Bruckterau. Married a daughter of count Heinrich II of Westphalia and died approx. 1091. Their son Adolf III called himself Count of Monte (Berg) He is known as Adolf I of Berg, mentioned in charters 1077–1082 Vogt in Gerresheim, Werden, Deutz and Berg. He married a daughter of count Dietrich I of Cleve and died approx 1082. With him the house of Berg starts.

== Counts of Berg ==
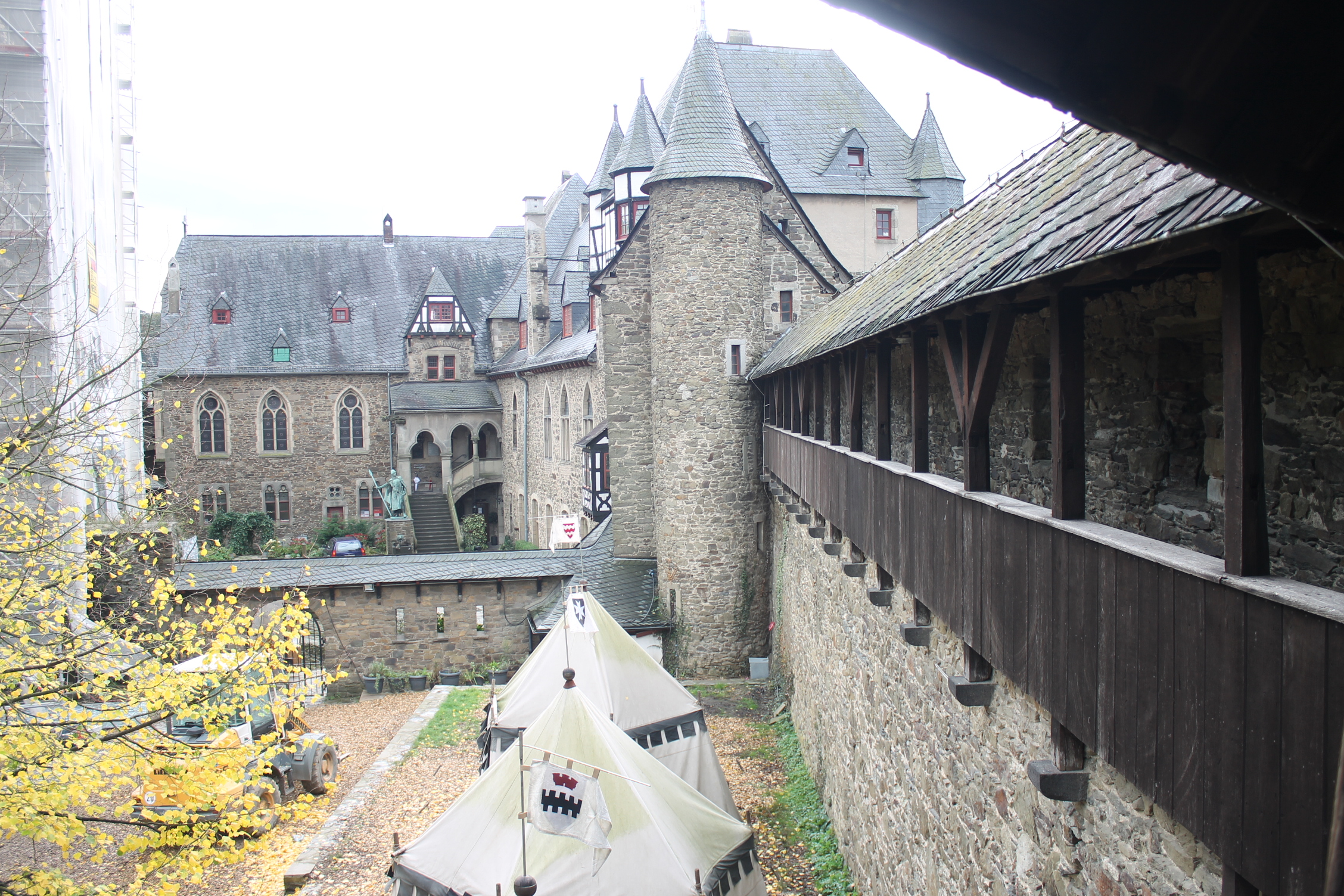
Castle of Burg on the river Wupper

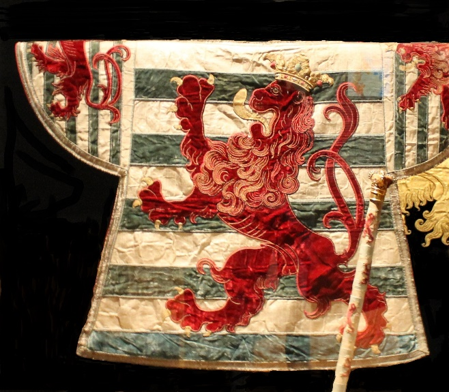
Tabard of the Herald of the Duchy Limburg (Vesdre), for the Stattholder-First King at Arms Golden Fleece. 15the Century. Weltliche Schatzkammer Vienna.

Adolf I of Berg(Huvili), count in the Auelgau from 1082 till 1093. He married in 1035 Adelheid von Laufen, heiress of Hövel, Unna, Telgte, Warendorf, etc. He founded the Altenberg monastery. Adolf III of Berg, called Puer (1093 till 1132) married N. von Spannheim. Their son, Eberhard of Berg, 1st Abbot of Georgenthal, convinced his brother Adolf IV of Berg-Altena to donate the Altenberg monastery to the Cistercian Order. His youngest son, Bruno II, Archbishop of Cologne, died in 1137 in Apulia on campaign with King Lothar of Germany against Roger II of Sicily. The Abbey of Altenberg became the main resting place of the counts and dukes of Van Berg, located in the middle of Keldachgau, the former Ezzoners gau in the 10th century, to the right of the Rhine east of Bonn, Cologne, Duisburg. On either side of the river Wupper. South of the river Ruhr and north of the river Sieg. The Ezzoner origin of the house of Berg corresponds with the location of their counties and the fact that descendants from the house of Berg, in the 11th up to 13th century occupies important positions. Archbishops of Cologne, Trier, bishops of Munster and Osnabruck, Abbis and Abbot of Abbeys and the counts were the keepers of guardianship Essen and Werden on the river Ruhr. Adolf IV of Berg-Altena (1132 until 1160) count of Altena. He married twice, Adelheid von Arnsberg and later on Irmgrad von Wasserburg daughter of Engelbert of Schwarzenberg. Adolf built the Schloss Altena. He joined in 1160 the monastery in Altenberg. He is father of crusader (Adolf V, killed in Damascus in 1108). Stamvader van two Archbishops of Cologne, a Duke of Westfalia and four Prince Bishops of Munster and Osnabrück. Oldest son Adolf V died and his next sons Engelbert I and Eberhard I of Berg followed. Adolf V of Berg(1189 till 1218), he took part in 1212 to the Crusade against the Albigensian. He died in 1218 in combat as commander of the troops in Damiette, in the delta of the Nile, with the Fifth Crusade. He left no son and Berg passed under the regency of his brother Engelbert I. to his daughter Irmgard. Engelbert I of Berg(1160 till 1189) married Margaretha of Gelre. He brought stability and prosperity to the county. In July 1189 he was killed on his way to the Holy Land during the Third Crusade. Their son Engelbert II of Berg, Archbishop of Cologne, Regent of Berg from 1218 till 1225, is better known as Saint Engelbert of Cologne. He was killed by companions of his cousin Frederick of Isenberg (see below).Irmgard was the next heiress of Berg until 1248, married to Henry IV Duke of Limburg since then he also was Count of Berg.

== Counts of Berg - Altena ==
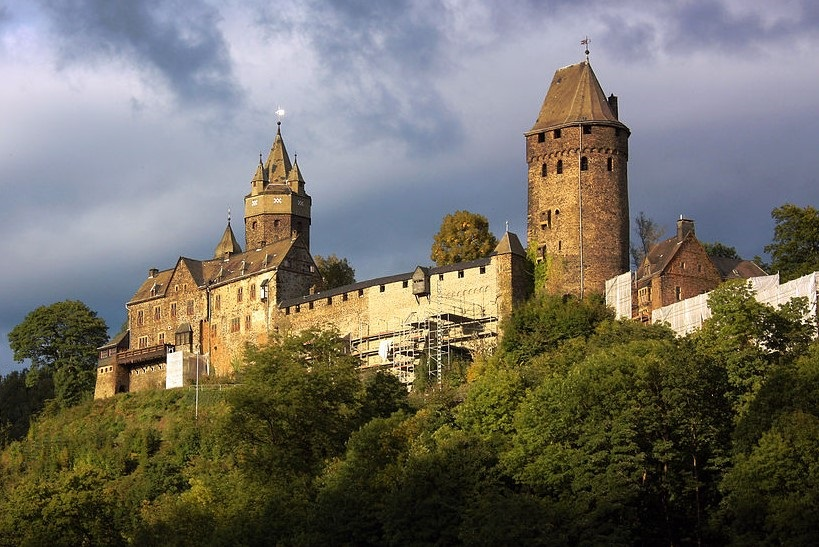
Castle of Altena on the river Lenne

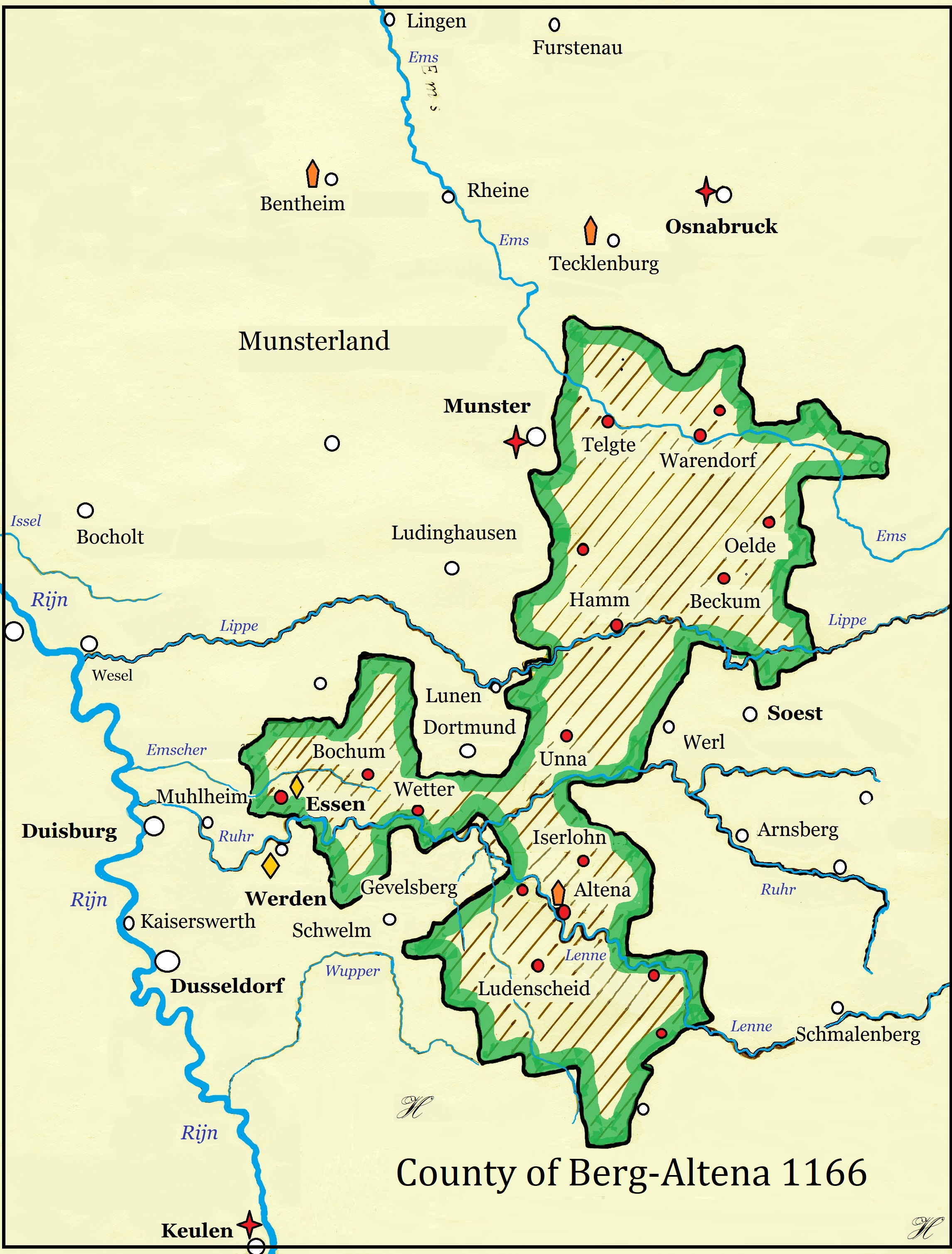
County of Berg-Altena Anno 1166

The younger brother of count Engelbert I of Berg, Eberhard I, Count of Berg-Altena was also known as Eberhard I of Altena. He inherited the eastern territory of county of Berg and took residence at the castle of Altena. He was married to Alvaris of Arnsberg and was the younger brother of Count Engelbert I. of Berg. From 1166 he is the ancestor of the branch Altena. Their sons Arnold and Frederick, with the agreement of their brother Adolf Archbishop of Cologne, shared their father's territory. Arnold I of Altena-Isenberg ancestor of the Counts Altena Isenberg, inherited the north-western territory of Altena (on the river Ruhr, nearby Hattingen) in 1200. He founded the line of the counts of Isenberg followed by the counts of Limburg (see below). Frederik I of Altena-Mark the youngest, inherited the south-eastern territory of Altena, and founded of the line of the Marck, from which descend the dukes of Cleves, Jülich and Berg, the dukes of Nevers and Bouillon, the counts of Schleiden, etc.

== Counts of Altena - Isenberg ==
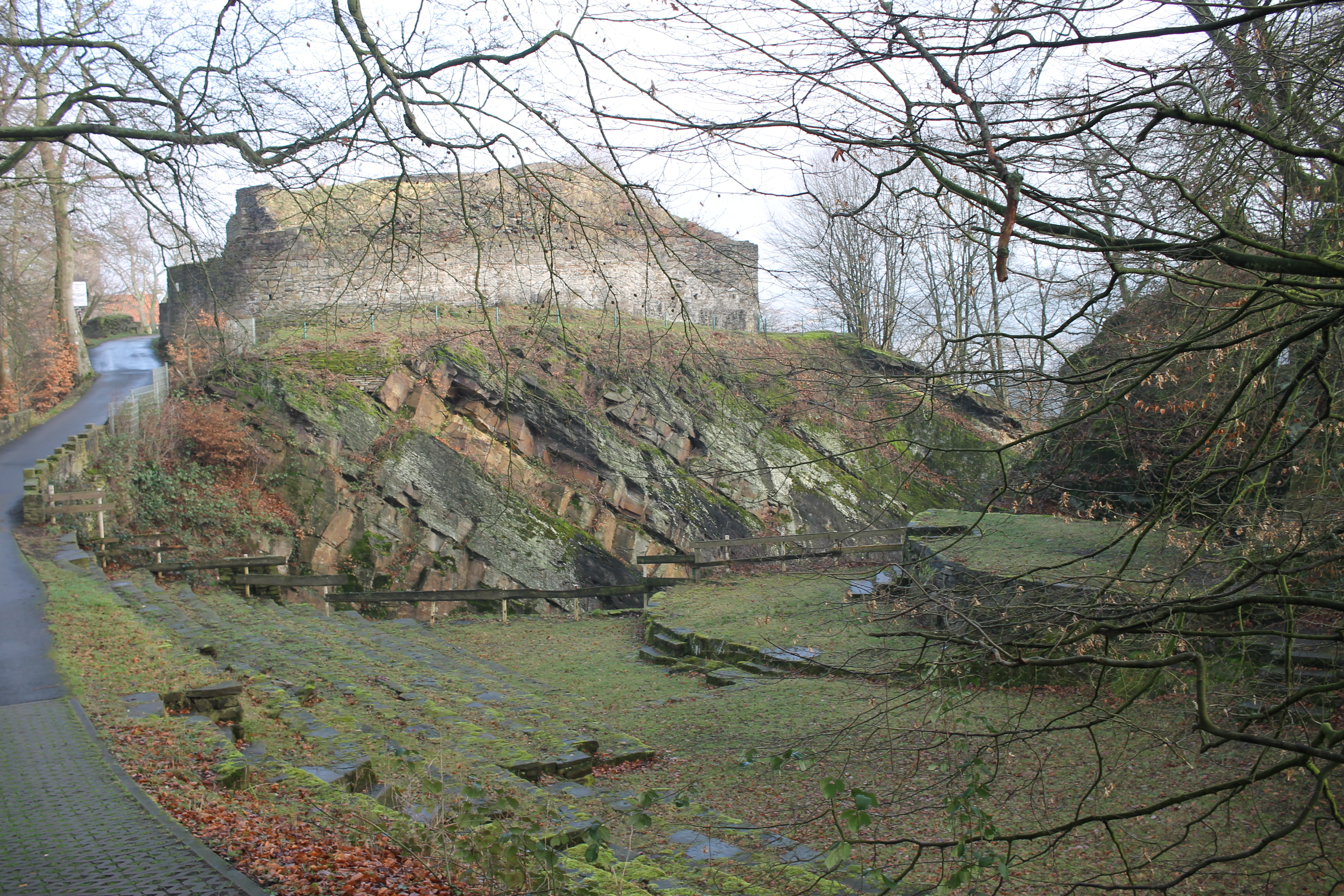
Remains of the Donjon. The Archbishop of Cologne, Heinrich von Müllenark, besieged and destroyed this castle of Isenberg on the river Ruhr in 1226

The castle of Hohenlimburg on the river Lenne

Frederick, Count of Altena Isenberg. He completed the castle of Isenberg on top of the mountain Isenberg. A conflict arose with his uncle Archbishop of Cologne, Engelbert II of Berg about the management of the monastic property when he wanted to expropriate his guardianship. On his way back from the town of Soest (located to the east of Dortmund) where uncle and nephew had negotiated in vain, to Cologne, Frederik raided his uncle Engelbert nearby Gevelsberg. In happened in the late afternoon of the 7th of November 1225, with the help of allies who also had serious grievances against the Archbishop's practices. The intention was to kidnap him as a hostage to castle Isenberg. A means of breaking a deadlock over disputed rights more often tried at that time. Accepted as long as it was a success. But in this case ended in tragedy. Archbishop Engelbert was unluckily killed. This event was of far-reaching significance to German history. Frederik fled and found temporary protection with an ally, count Otto of Tecklenburg. Frederick of Isenberg was outlawed and excommunicated. He was stripped of all offices and stewardships and his personal wealth was confiscated. In the winter of 1225/1226 the new Archbishop of Cologne, Heinrich von Müllenark, besieged and destroyed his castle Isenberg. (At present the ruin is a national monument). His cousin, Adolf von der Mark, was attributed large portions of Frederick's possessions. Frederik's wife, duchess Sofie of Limburg, found shelter at the castle of Limburg (Veste), where her brother duc Hendrik of Limburg received her with the children. Sofia would die a year later with her youngest child. Traumatized after supporting her husband in Cologne during the brutal execution.

Frederik's brothers, Diederik bishop of Műnster, Engelbert, bishop of Osnabrück and Bruno at that moment cleric in Osnabrück were removed from office. Bishop Diederick died on his return journey from Rome where he travelled with brother Frederik to the Pope for penance. Later on Bishop Engelbert returned as bishop and was followed in office by Bruno. A large sum of blood money had been put 2,100 silver marks on Frederik's head. While he was sleeping in an inn near Arlon, dressed as a merchant, where he spent the night, he was cunningly taken by surprise and taken to Cologne. In the tumultuous trial in Nuremberg a few months later, a staircase collapsed, killing many of Frederik's supporters and opponents. Frederik van Isenberg was convicted, taken away from his county and possessions, and put to death on the wheel in Cologne on November 13 in the year 1226 in front of St. Severin's church. Sofia stayed by his side that day and night. Early in the morning of November 14 he died.

== The Battle for a Lost County ==
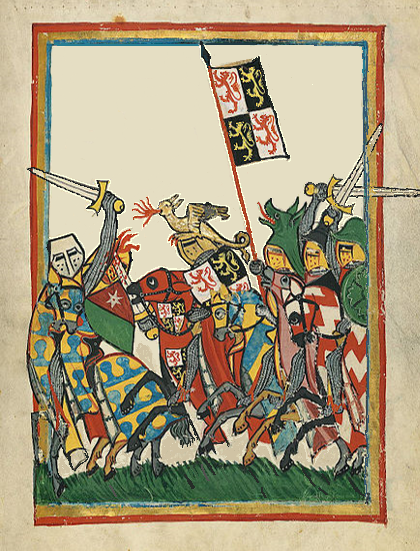
The Battle of Woeringen at Saturday 5 juni 1288

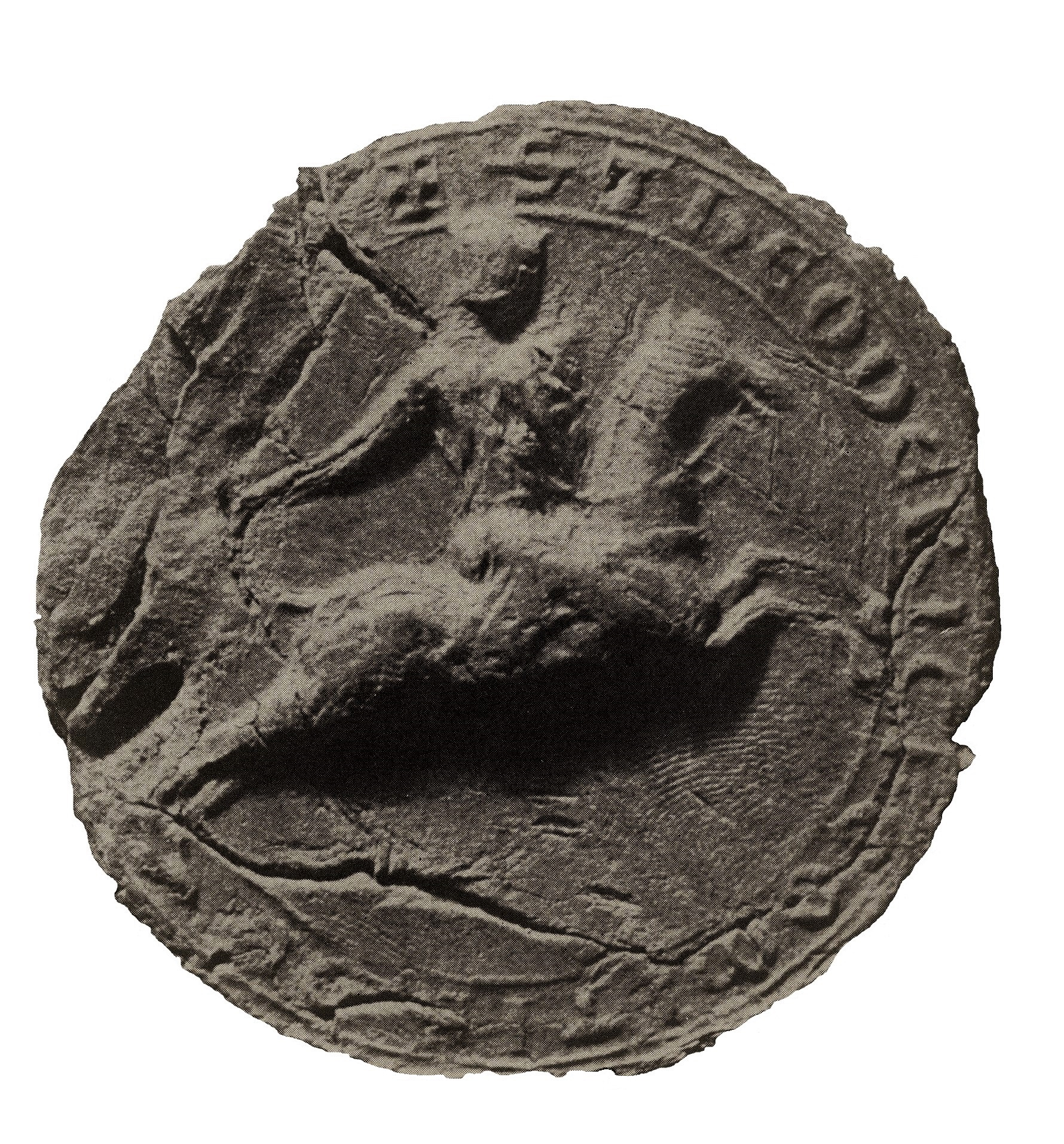
The wax seal of count Diederik I of Limburg 1246

Frederik's sons Diederick I of Isenberg, (1215–1301) and Frederik junior who died as a teenager, were brought up at the ducal court by their uncle Hendrik. At a young age they fought with the support of knights of their uncle to reclaim lost property. Diederick built a wooden fort and nearby a stone castle as a support point on the Schleipenberg (near Hagen Germany), the castle Hohenlimburg named after his mother's family. In 1241–1242 he built a second castle New Isenberg opposite the town of Werden on the river Ruhr. On May 1, 1243, he was formally recognized as count of part of his father's recaptured territory. Until then he call himself 'Van Isenberg' later on Diederick I of Limburg (1215–1301). Diederick's son, Johan died at the age of thirty and left two sons and one daughter. His younger brother Everhard continued 30 years more, the struggle together with his father for the conquest of former Isenberger family property.

== Succession of the county Limburg Lenne ==
At the end of the 13th century Everhard I was his only surviving son, male heir (son of the body), the closest descendant of the original holder of the county. Since 1287 mentioned as count Theodericus comes senior de Lymburg and Everhardus comes de Lymburg. It was clear that the future male-line primogeniture was granted. In 1296, Diederik I eighty years of age, his son fifty and his grandson Dietrich III(II) twenty years old. More than 30 years, Everhard had fought together with his father to regain the county and allodial family property. After his first brothers Henry (1241 -1243), Johan (1247–1277) finally Everhard became the ancestor of the house Counts of Limburg. According the noble feudal right, the county Limburg Lenne, fief of the counts of Berg, passed to him. He died in 1308 and the county passed to his son Diederik III(II). At their coins minted COMITIS EV(erhar)DI LIMBURGE(nsis) and THEODERI COMES.

== Battle of Woeringen 1288 ==
The family came into a difficult position when Diederick's nephew, Duke Walram V of Limburg, died in 1280. The Limburg Succession War (1283–1288) around the Duchy of Limburg erupted in fury. At Battle of Woeringen Saturday 5 June 1288, just north of Cologne on the river Rhine, the Duke of Brabant and his allies defeated Van Mark, Gulik-Loos, Bergse sergeants and Cologne civilians in a devastating battle of the Cologne Archbishop Siegfried van Westerburg with allies, Gelre, Valkenburg and Kur-keulen sergeants. Diederick of Limburg with son Everhard did not personally participate, but did support the Cologne archbishop. As a result, great-nephew Count Everhard of the Mark, who had sided with Duke Johan I of Brabant and was one of the victors, destroyed the Neuen Isenberg and took and occupied the Hohenlimburg. Diederik I, Everhard I and other family members fled to their allodial castle Styrum (near present-day Oberhausen), where Diederik died in 1301.

== Succession of the territory Broich ==
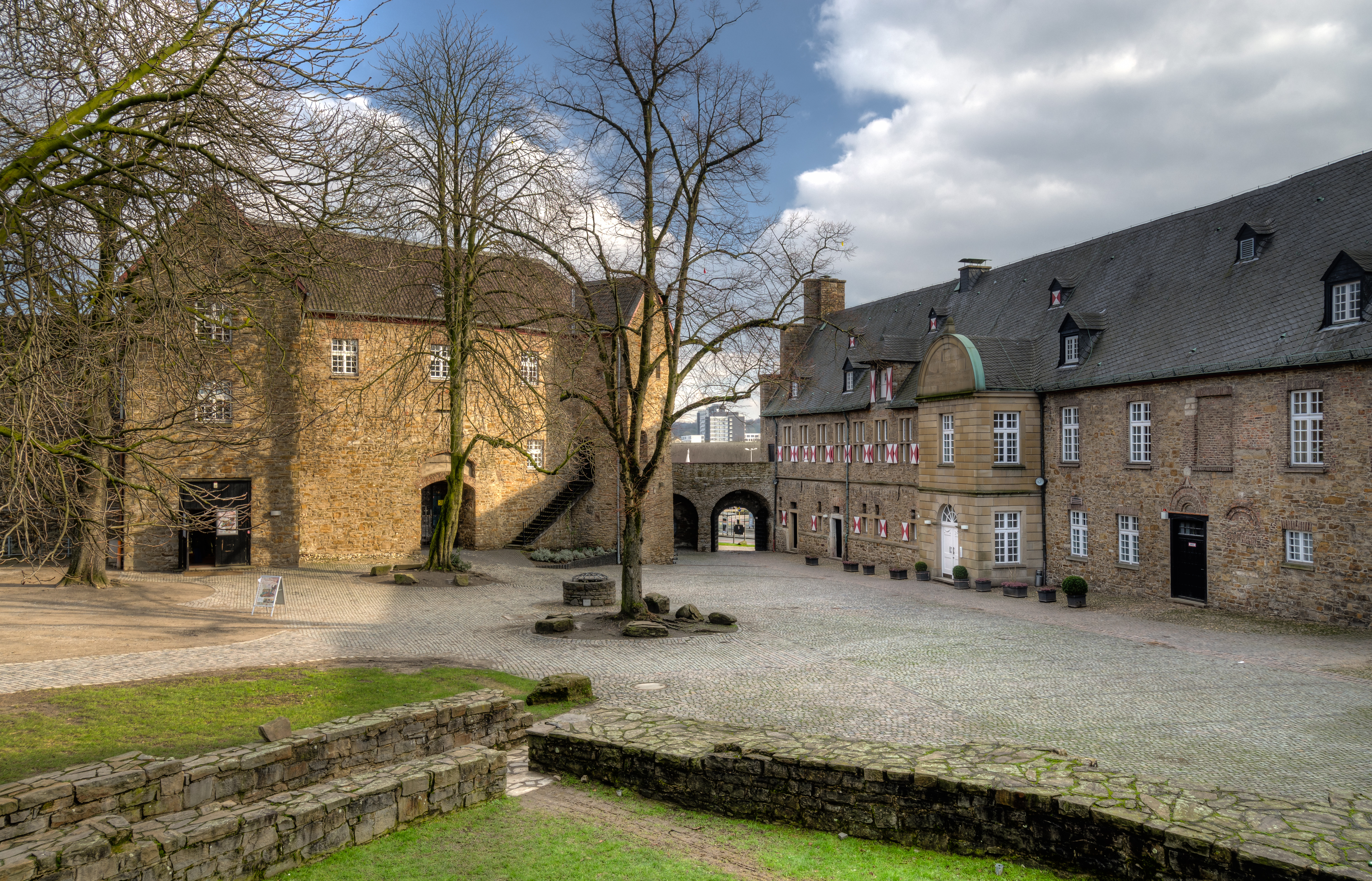
Interior courtyard of the Castle of Broich in Mülheim on the river Ruhr

After Everhard I. succeeded his father he was able to return to the Hohenlimburg in 1304. But shortly until his death in 1308, he ruled the county and was then succeeded by his son count Diederick II He also survived his son Everhard II who died on 11 November 1344. In 1401 grandson Diederik III succeeded his grandfather as count of Limburg Hohenlimburg and married on 3 July 1371 to the heiress Lukarda of Broich. The Lordship of the territory of Broich came to the counts of Limburg Hohenlimburg.

== Counts of Limburg Hohenlimburg & Broich ==
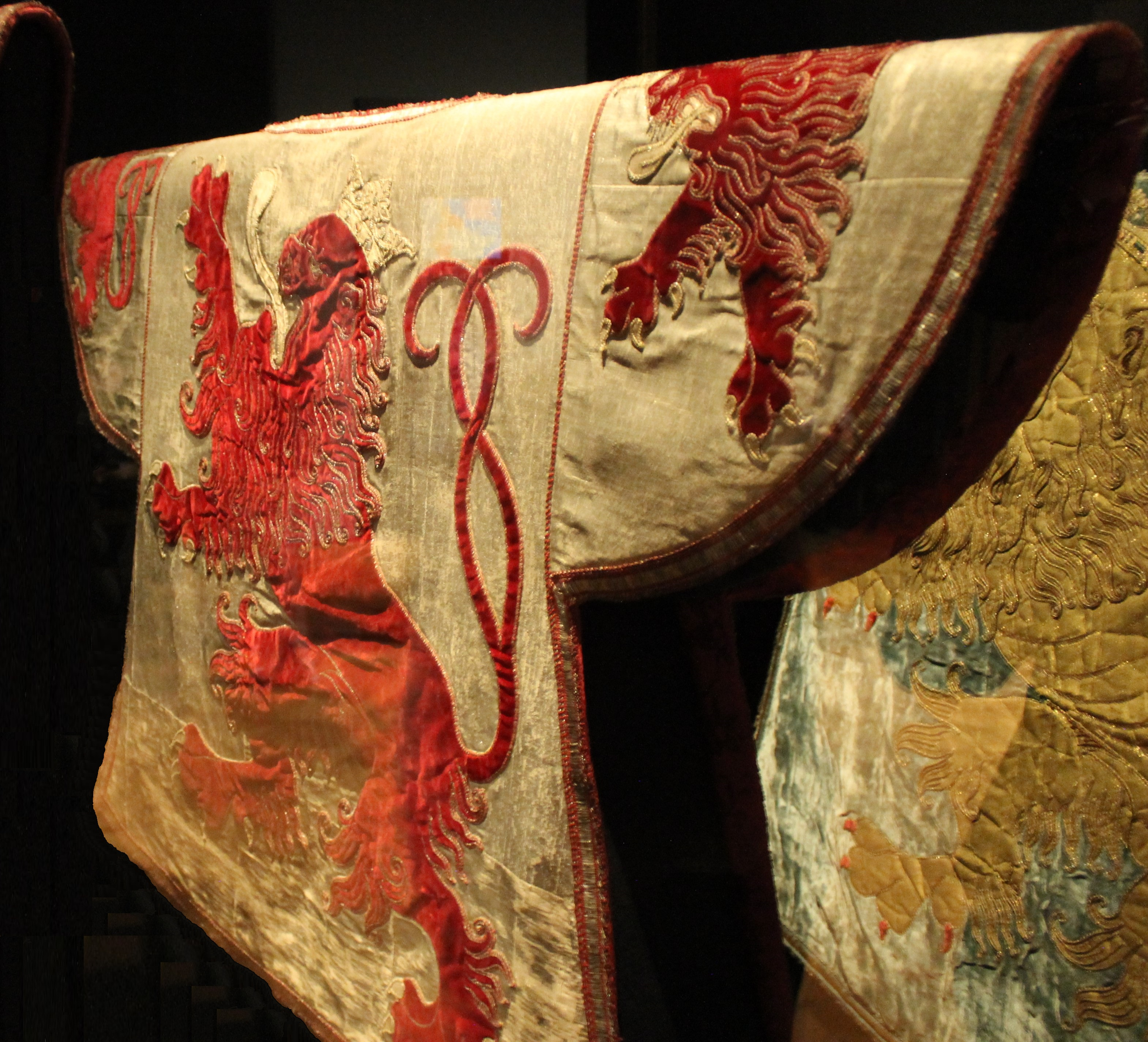
Surcoat of the herald of the County Limburg (Lenne). Weltliche Schatzkammer Vienna

The two sons of Diederik III count of Limburg Hohenlimburg and Broich, Count Willem I and brother Diederik IV shared the family property. Willem chose the Hohenlimburg for his residence and Diederick IV the Broich castle. But both retained rights to the Hohenlimburg and Broich. Count Willem I. married Metta of Reifferscheidt and had a son who died young. His daughter Margaretha married Gumprecht II. of Neuenahr, heiress of Cologne and lord of Alphen. Diederick IV. of Limburg married Henrica of Wisch, from the family of the Banner lords of Wisch in Gelre. As soon as count William I died in 1459, his son-in-law Neuenahr hastened to usurp the county with Hohenlimburg Castle. He invoked his marriage treaty and had used his position to assure himself with the German Roman King Frederik that he would lend him "vom Reich zu Lehnen" with the county. Diederick's (IV) sons Willem II, Diederick V and Hendrik I undertook firm counter-action. Occupied the Hohenlimburg and had duke Gerhard of Gulik-Berg lend to them the county. The king was declared incapable of jurisdiction because Limburg was not a state-county under the king, but a fief of the dukes of Berg. The Cologne Archbishop Vincius of Mors Saarwenden broke the impasse that had arisen. With a large number of witnesses on both sides, he mediates and decides in 1460 that the county and the Hohenlimburg become a condominium with Neuenahr. That was a considerable financial loss for the Limburgs because the proceeds had to be divided from now on. But the Neuenahrs did not get what they had been after, as it turned out later.

== Johan III, Last Count of Limburg Hohenlimburg Broich ==
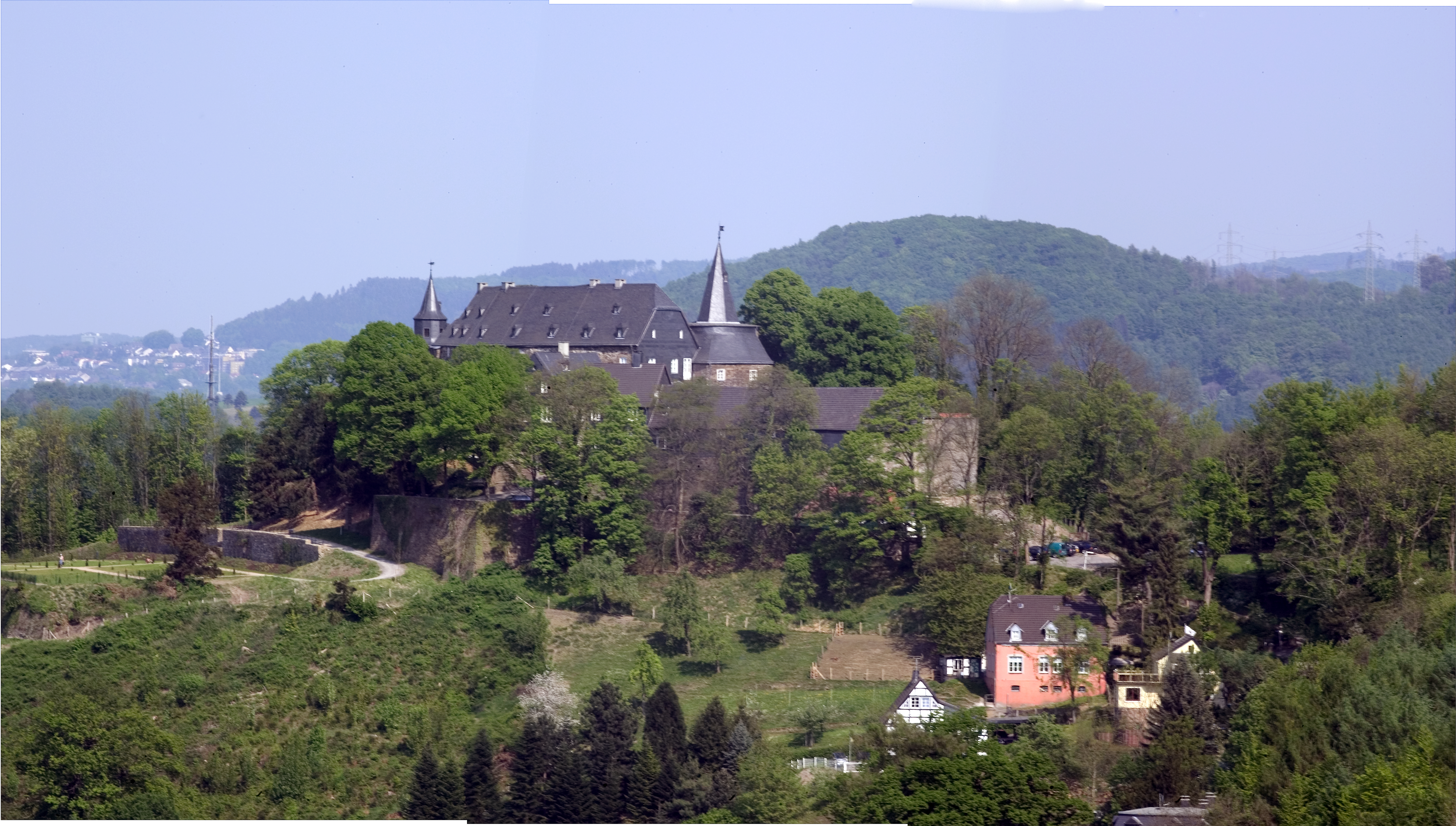
The Castle of Hohenlimburg

The last count Johan III, at his turn the oldest surviving male of the inherence line, married Elisabeth also a Neuenahr but left no children. Again it looked as if the county would come to the house Neuenahr. Johan, who was put under extra pressure from them about his properties. After the death of his wife, may have wondered why he too had not had children when he married a Neuenahr. As a widower, at the last minute in 1508, he dedicated his estate to his adoptive daughter Irmgard of Sayn at her marriage to Wirich V of Daun-Falkenstein. Irmgard who was the daughter of Johans sister Maria of Limburg and count Sebastian of Sayn. That inherence by adoption was discussed and granted by William duke of Jülich-Berg, son of Gerhard VII, duke of Jülich-Berg and Sophie of Saxe-Lauenburg. When Gerhard VII died in 1475, William became both duke of Jülich and duke of Berg. The county Limburg Lenne (still a condominium) not was a primogeniture in strictly (or more precisely male primogeniture) The Male Heir, oldest surviving son of the body, was the principle that feudal fief right, pass to a closest heir of the body. The closest descendant of original holder in 1511, was in fact his sister Maria.

The Hohenlimburg, the county of Limburg with count title in 1592 finally came Arnold III, Count of Bentheim-Steinfurt-Tecklenburg-Limburg married with Magdalena of Neuenahr-Alpen, daughter of Count Gumprecht II, Count of Neuenahr-Alpen (1503–1556) and his wife, Countess Amöne of Daun-Falkenstein (1537–1560). A clear example of dynastic marriage. The condominium became in one hand. This house Bentheim Tecklenburg who ruled the county until 1808 and have owned the castle Hohenlimburg ever since.

== Family 'Van Limburg' ==
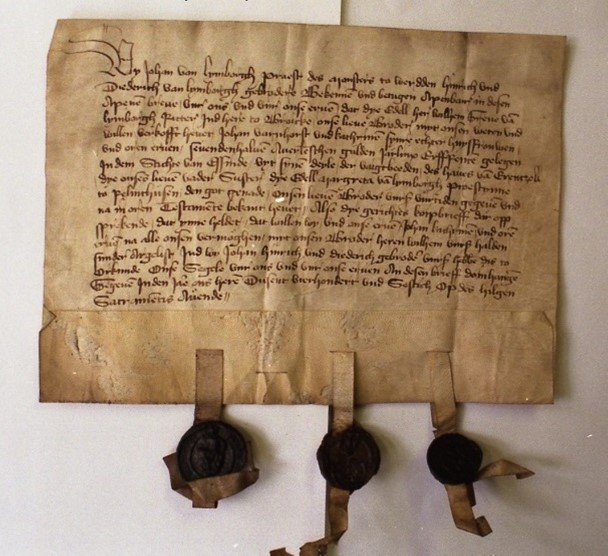
Charter dated 13 juli 1460. Johan of Limburg, probst of Werden, executor of the will of Margaretha of Limburg, abbes of the cloister of Rellinghausen. He made an arrangement with his brothers Hendrik and Diederik V van Limburg-Hohenlimburg-Broich in accordance with the will of their aunt Margaretha.

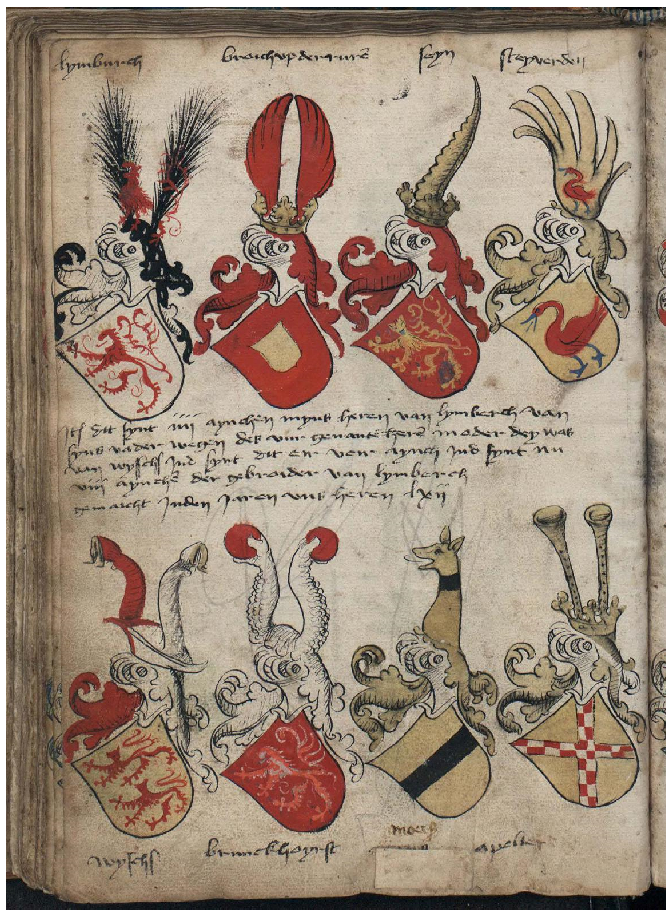
Quarterly Arms Counts of Limburg Hohenlimburg Broich 15th Century Brothers Willem Hendrik Diederick Everhard Johan

Count Johan (III) had only two close cousins Dietrich and Adolf, sons of his godfather Johan (II) of Limburg (1421–1472). Their uncle Count Hendrik determined that they were joint heirs. They were appointed as Wiltforster and Holzgraf of the Saarner forests, part of the county of Limburg Broich. Their father Johan, former provost of the Benedictine monastery Werden, was count Hendrik's brother. After 30 years in office, Johan left the monastery and married out of love, Anna Borckhartz zu Schenkenbush. This marriage took place under the testimony of the mayor Jacob Borken, brother counsel Johannes Borken and magistrate Rutger of Galen called Halswic of the city of Essen. At that time it was a legal but not equal marriage. Anna's family had their estate Schenkenbusch on loan from the abbey, some family members belonged to the city council of Essen. But they did not come from a noble family. The marriage was kept secret until 1553. That year on April 22, the lawyer Dr. Johan Amerdinck handed over an official deed to the abbot of Werden, Herman of Holthe, on the basis of which the legitimate right of inheritance was claimed by Willem of Limburg grandson of provost Johan. That was confirmed and accepted by the abbot. Before the end of the 16th century, these last patrilineal descendants of the former counts of Limburg Hohenlimburg left Germany during the devastating Thirty Years' War (1618–1648), for the Netherlands and settled in Gelderland. The current members of this last family branch "Van Limburg" still living in the Netherlands, some abroad.

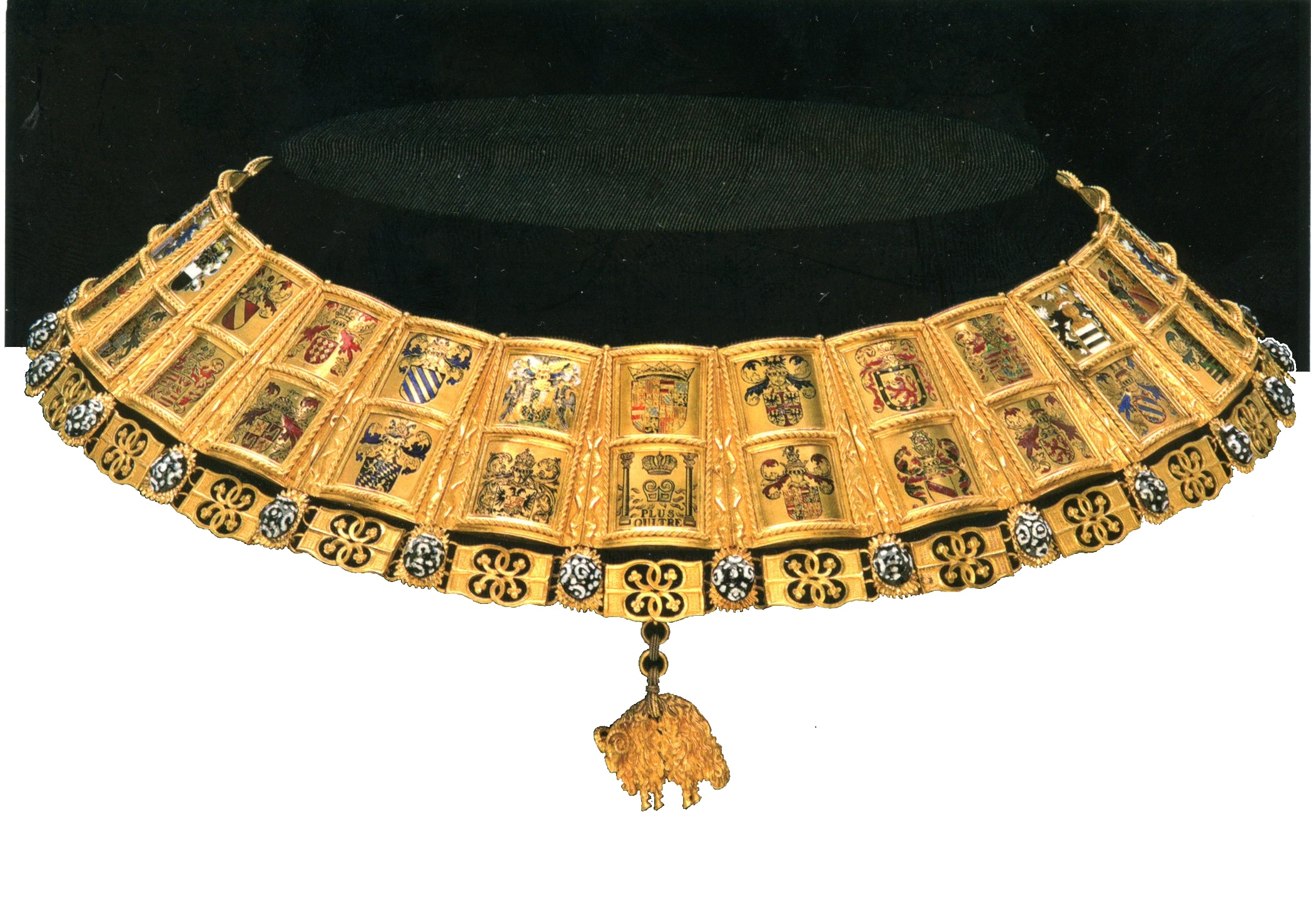
The Potence (Chain of Arms) of the Herald of the Order of the Golden Fleece. (Upper row, from the middle, 2e coat right) the coat of arms of the county Limburg. Schatzkammer Vienna.

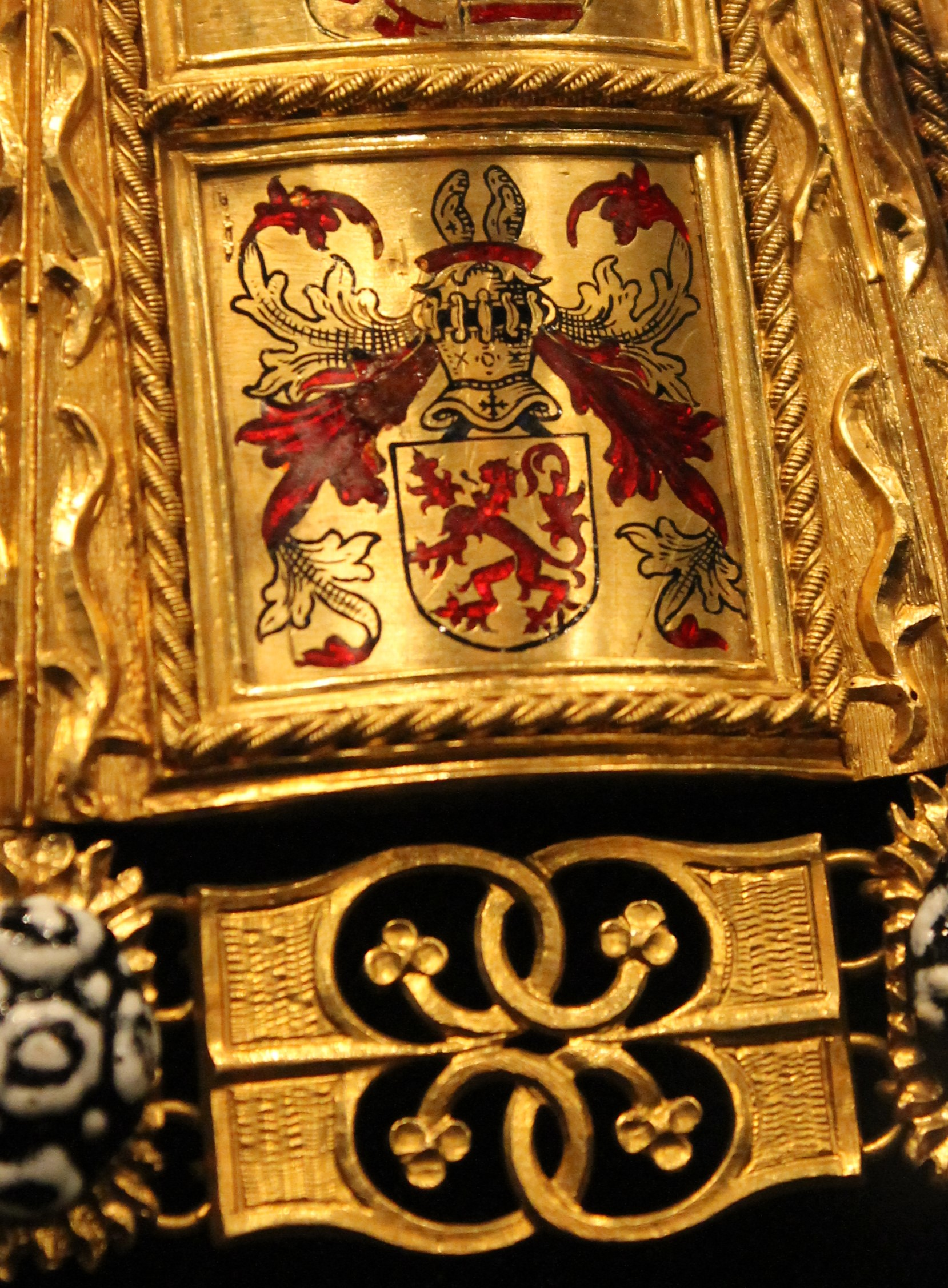
Detail of the coat of arms county Limburg. The Potence (Chain of Arms) of the Herald of the Order of the Golden Fleece. Schatzkammer Vienna

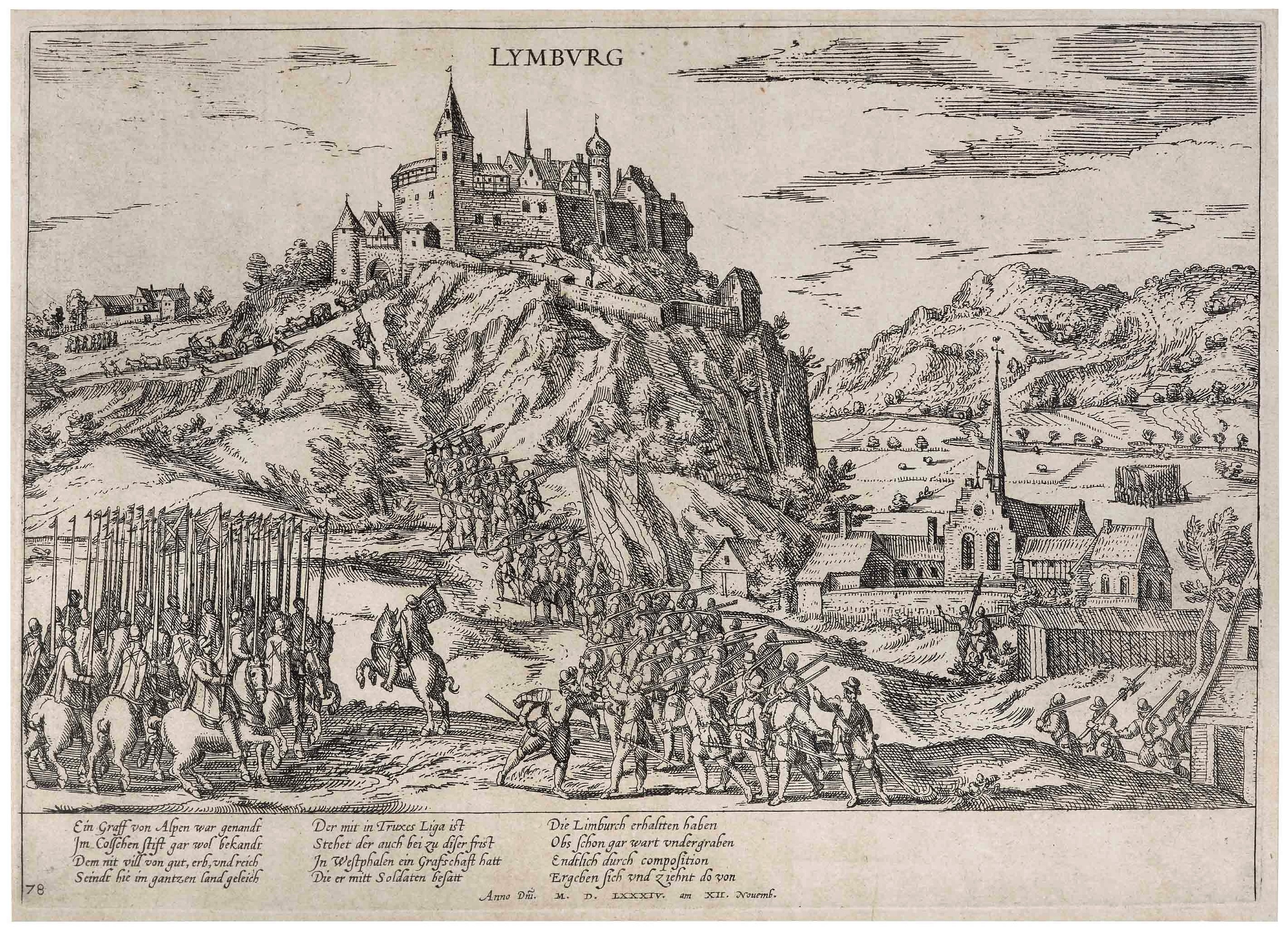
The siege of Hohenlimburg 12 November 1584 during the Cologne war when the Cologne Archbishop Gerhard Truchsess I of Waldburg tried to transform Cologne from a Catholic Archbishopric into a Protestant Duchy (Etching by Hogenberg)

== Correct lineage counts of Limburg-Hohenlimburg-Broich ==
- Diederick I of Limburg-Hohenlimburg (1215–1301), count of Isenberg-Limburg
- Everhart I of Limburg-Hohenlimburg (1253–1308), count of Limburg Hohenlimburg
- Dietrich II of Limburg-Hohenlimburg (1276–1364), count of Limburg Hohenlimburg
- Everhard II (1298–1344), knight.
- Diederik III of Limburg Hohenlimburg (1328-1401), count of Limburg Hohenlimburg. Succeeded his grandfather Diederick II due to the pre-death of his father Everhart II. Married Lukarda of Broich and also became lord of Broich with the castle of Broich.
- ▷ Johan of Limburg-Hohenlimburg (1373–1459), Lord of Lordship Hardenberg with castle Hardenberg in Germany.
  - ▷ — Everhart of Limburg-Hardenberg. Lord in the territory of Hardenberg in Gernany. Family branch died out in 1429.
- William I. of Limburg-Hohenlimburg-Broich (1373–1459), count of Limburg Hohenlimburg lord of Broich.
- Diederick IV of Limburg-Hohenlimburg-Broich (1375–1444), count of Limburg Hohenlimburg lord of Broich, brother of Willem I.
- Willem II. of Limburg-Hohenlimburg-Broich (1416–1473), count of Limburg Hohenlimburg lord of Broich. Son of Diederick IV.
- ▷ Brother Hendrik I. of Limburg-Hohenlimburg-Broich (1417–1486), count (1473) of Limburg Hohenlimburg lord of Broich.
- ▷ Brother Diederick V. of Limburg-Hohenlimburg-Broich (1419–1478), ambtman of Iserlohn.
- ▷ Brother Eberhart of Limburg-Hohenlimburg-Broich (1420–1453), kellner of Werden.
- ▷ Brother Johan II. of Limburg-Hohenlimburg-Broich (1421–1472), canon, provost of Werden until reform 1468. Married Anna Borckharts zu Schenkenbusch. Left two children, Dietrich (pre marriage) and Adolf I of Limburg (legitime). Last family brance Van Limburg still exist.
- Johan III of Limburg-Hohenlimburg-Broich (1464–1511), count of Limburg Hohenlimburg lord of Broich. Son of Willem II, follows (1486) his uncle Hendrik I.

== Bibliography ==
- Sieert-Gasper, D:. Zur Herkunft von Sikko, Graf im Bonn- und Ahrgau. Ein Beitrag zu Herrschaftbeziehungen im 10. und 11. Jahrhundert." AHVN 204 (2001) 13-71
- Corstens, S. :Rheinische Adelsherrschaft im ersten Jahrtausend. RV 28 (1963)
- Kraus, T R.1981 [German] Die Entstehung der Landesherrschaft der Grafen von Berg bis zum Jahre 1225, Neustadt an der Aisch
- Lacomblet, T.J. (1954) Urkundenbuch für die Geschichte des Niederrheins 1-4. 1840-1858 Reprinted: Urkundenbuch Niederrheins 1954.
- Lewald, U.1979 [German] Die Ezzonen. Das Schicksal eines rheinischen Fürstengeschlechtes. In: Rheinische Vierteljahresblätter 43,1979
- Davies, N. (1996). Europe: A History. Oxford, UK: Oxford University Press. ISBN 0-19-520912-5. p. 317 Theophau dtr Romanas II P.311-315 over Castle, counts lords machtbasis
- Oediger, F.W.1972 [German]: Geschichte des Erzbistums Köln. Band 1. Das Bistum Köln von den Anfängen bis zum Ende des 12. Jahrhunderts, zweite Auflage.
- Rudiger, R. / Barth, E.1990 [German] Der Herzog in Lotharingien im 10. Jahrhundert. Jan Thorbecke Verlag Sigmaringen
- Kimpen, E. Ezzonen und Hezeliniden in der rheinischen Pfalzgrafschaft. Mitteilungen des Instituts für österreichische Geschichtsforschung. Ergänzungsband 12 (1933). Die ezzonischen Verwandtschaft der rheinische Pfalzgrafen. In Coburg mitten im Reich. Festgabe zum 900. Gedenkjahr der ersten Erwähnung der Ur-Coburg und ihres Umlandes
- Rudiger Barth, E.: Der Herzog in Lotharingien im 10. Jahrhundert. Jan Thorbecke Verlag Sigmaringen 1990 (Ermenfridus, Ezzo)
- Tille, A. Eine unbekannte Urkunde des Pfalzgrafen Hermann I. von Lothringen. Neues Archiv der Gesellschaft für ältere deutsche Geschichtskunde 26 (1901)
- Oediger, F.W.: Geschichte des Erzbistums Köln. Band 1. Das Bistum Köln von den Anfängen bis zum Ende des 12. Jahrhunderts, zweite Auflage Köln 1972.
- Bernhardt, J. W. (2002). Itinerant Kingshiop & Royal Monasteries in Early Medieval Germany, c.936-1075. Cambridge University Press
- Riley-Smith, J. (1989). "Crusades". In Loyn, H. R. (ed.). The Middle Ages: A Concise Encyclopedia. London: Thames and Hudson. pp. 106–107. ISBN 0-500-27645-5. p. 106-107 Katharen
- Goody. J, “Introduction 1-3” Thirsk. J, “The European debate on customs of inheritance Page 178-190. In Thomson. E.P (Red) In Rural Society in Western Europe 1200 – 1800. Cambridge University Press 1976. Unesco Digital Library. ISBN 0-521-21246-4.Goody. J, “ The development of the family and marriage in Europe” Cambridge 1983
- Spiess. K. H Das Lehnswesen in den frühen deutschen Lehnsverzeichnissen. In: Dendorfer/ Deutinger, Lehnswesen im Hochmittelalter, S. 91–102;./ feudal records in medieval Germany. In: Nieus J.F (Hg.), Le vassal, le fief et l’écrit. Pratiques d’écriture et enjeux documentaires dans le champ de la féodalité XIe–XVe Early s. / SPIESS. K. H Formalisierte Autorität: Entwicklungen im Lehnsrecht des 13. Jahrhunderts. In: Historische Zeitschrift 295 (2012), S. 62–77. / Das älteste Lehnsbuch der Pfalzgrafen bei Rhein vom Jahr 1401. Edition und Erläuterungen (Veröffentlichungen der Kommission für Geschichtliche Landeskunde in Baden-Württemberg, Reihe A/30), Stuttgart 1981
- Blok. D.P « Opmerkingen over het aasdom” Tijdschrift voor Rechtsgeschiedenis 31 (1963) p. 243-274. Trefwoorden: Onsterflijk erfleenrecht. Bonfield..L, “Marriage, property and succession
- Bleicher, W. Hohenlimburgher Heimatblätter fűr den Raum Hagen und Isenlohn. Beiträge zur Landeskunde. Monatsschrift des Vereins fűr Orts- und Heimatkunde Hohenlimburg e.V. Drűck Geldsetzer und Schäfer Gmbh. Iserlohn.
- Hoederath, H.T. Der Fall des Hauses Isenberg 1225/1226 in rechtsgeschichterlicher und soziologischer Schau, 1954 Zeitschrift der Savigny stiftung fur Rechtsgeschichte. Kanonistische Abteilung
- Finger, H. Die Isenberger Fehde und das politische Zusammenwachsen des nördslichen Rhienlands mit Westfahlen in der Stauferzeit. Annalen. Heft 197. Des Historischen Vereins fűr dem Niederrhein. Inbesondere das alte Erzbistum Köln
- Loyn, H. R. (1989). "Hundred Years' War". In Loyn, H. R. (ed.). The Middle Ages: A Concise Encyclopedia. London: Thames and Hudson. p. 176. ISBN 0-500-27645-5.
- Aders, G. Die Grafen (von Limburg) und die Herrn von Limburg-Styrum aus dem Haus Berg-Altena-Isenberg. Zeitschift 'Der Marker" 1956 blad 7.
- Korteweg, K.N. De Nederlandse Leeuw Jaargang LXXXI no.8 August 1964. Corrected lineage of descendants of Dietrich I Graf von Limburg Hohenlimburg.
- Berg, A. Same independent conclusion lineage counts of Limburg Hohenlimburg and Lords of Limburg-Styrum. Archive fur Sippenforschung Heft 14. Jahrgang 30. Mai 1964.
- Van Limburg, H. 2016. Graven van Limburg Hohenlimburg & Broich. Printing house: Pro-Book Utrecht 2016. Edition Bolcom (search term: bol.com 9789492185594) Counts of Limburg Hohenlimburg and their descendants along the patrilinear line, period 850–1800. 300 pages
- Van Limburg, H. 2016. Graven van Limburg Hohenlimburg & Broich. Regesten Deel 01. & Regesten Deel 02. 2016; Printing house: Pro-Book Utrecht. 2016. Edition Bolcom (search term: bol.com 9789492185600) 1850 charter- and deed transcriptions, period 1180–1800. Two volumes 1050 pages
