= Lauffen (disambiguation) =

Lauffen am Neckar, or simply Lauffen, is a town in the district of Heilbronn, Baden-Württemberg, Germany.

Lauffen may also refer to:

- Lauffen, Upper Austria, a town in Austria
- Richard Lauffen, a German actor
- Adelaide of Lauffen, a German noblewoman

== See also ==
- Laufen (disambiguation)
- Laufen Castle (disambiguation)
