= Adolf I of Berg =

11th Century Count of Berg

- Count of Berg
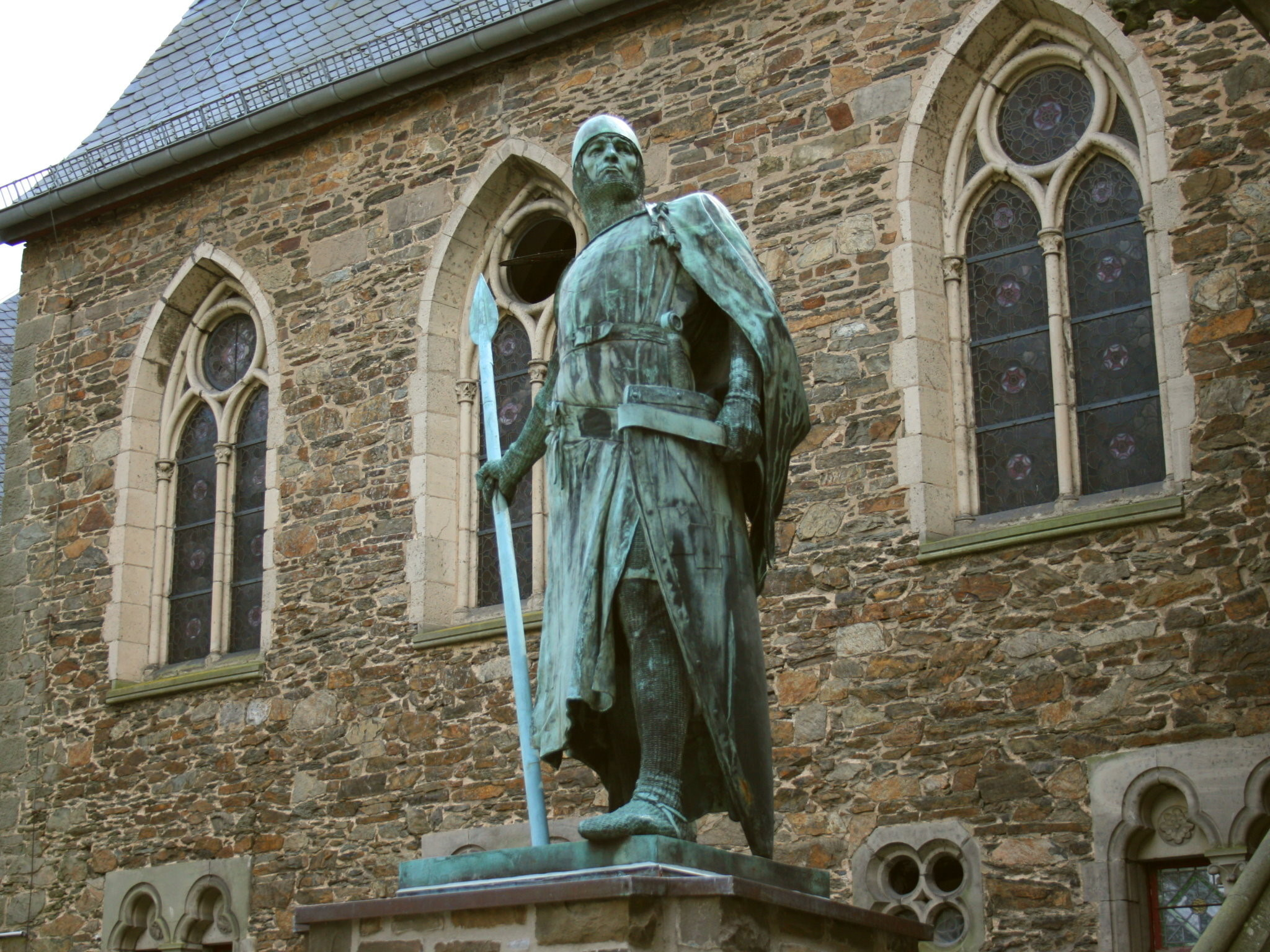
- Statue of Adolf I at Schloss Burg
- Tenure: 1077—1082
- Successor: Adolf II of Berg
- Other titles: Vogt of Werden, Deutz, Berg and Gerresheim
- Died: 1086
- Noble family: Berg
- Issue: Adolf II of Berg
- Father: Adolf II of Lotharingia

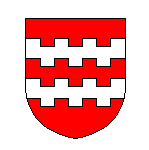
Ancient arms of the Counts of Berg.

Adolf I of Berg, count of Berg from 1077 until 1082, Vogt of Werden, Deutz, Berg and Gerresheim (died 1086). He was the son of Adolf II of Lotharingia count of Keldachgau, Vogt of Deutz (1002–1041).

The dynasty can be traced back to Adolf I at the beginning of the eleventh century especially by following the succession of the advocates of Deutz monastery across the Rhine, opposite Cologne. From that point forth the succession of the counts of Berg is well enough documented.

Adolf I of Berg left one son:

- Adolf II of Berg-Hövel, count of Berg, count of Auelgau and Siegburg, Vogt of Werden, founded the Altenberg Abbey (died 1090 or 1106).

== Literature ==
- Alberic of Troisfontaines (MGH, Scriptores XXIII).
- The Annales Rodenses from the Dutch medieval abbey at Rolduc, (MGH, Scriptores, XVI).
- Annalista Saxo (MGH, Scriptores VI).
- Gesta Trevirorum (MGH, Scriptores VIII).
- MGH, Diplomata. – REK I-II. – Rheinisches UB.
- Hömberg, “Geschichte.” – Jackman, “Counts of Cologne.”
- Klebel, E. “Niederösterreich und der Stammbaum der Grafen von Görz und Schwarzburg.” Unsere Heimat. Monatsblatt des Vereins für Landeskunde von Niederösterreich 23 (1952) 111-23.
- Kluger, “Propter claritatem generis.”
- Lück, D. “Der Avelgau, die erste fassbare Gebietseinteilung an der unteren Sieg.” In: Heimatbuch der Stadt Siegburg I. Ed. H. J. Roggendorf. Siegburg, 1964. pp. 223–85.
- Lück, D. “In pago Tuizichgowe – Anmerkungen zum Deutzgau.” Rechtsrheinisches Köln 3 (1977) 1-9.
- Tyroller, “Genealogie.”
- Wunder, G. “Die Nichten des Erzbischofs Friedrich von Köln.” AHVN 164 (1962) 192-6.
- Wunder, G. “Die Verwandtschaft des Erzbischofs Friedrich I. von Köln. Ein Beitrag zur abendländischen Verflechtung des Hochadels im Mittelalter.” AHVN 166 (1964) 25-54.

Preceded by -	Count of Berg; 1077–1082	Succeeded by Adolf II
