= Adolf II of Berg =

Adolf II of Berg-Hövel
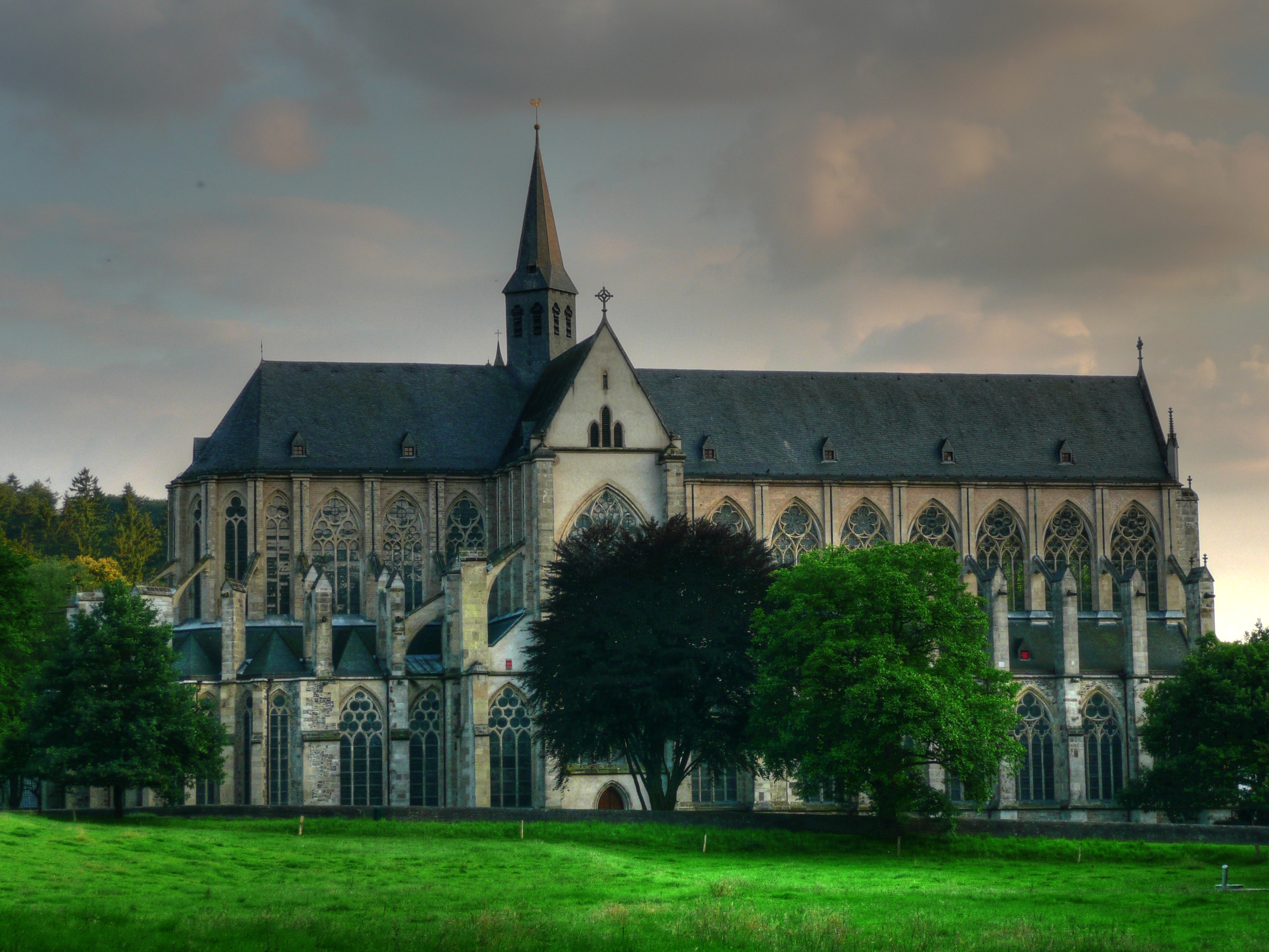
- The Altenberg Abbey, founded by Adolf II von Berg.

Count of Berg
- Predecessor: Adolf I
- Successor: Adolf III
- Died: 1090/1106
- Spouse: Adelheid von Laufen
- Issue: Adolf III of Berg
- House: House of Berg
- Father: Adolf I of Berg

Adolf II of Berg-Hövel (Huvili), count of Berg, count in Auelgau and Siegburg, Vogt of Werden (died 1090/1106), was the son of Adolf I of Berg.

He married Adelaide of Lauffen, a daughter of Heinrich II count von Laufen (died 1067) and Ida von Werl-Hövel (1030?–1090), and heiress of Hövel/Huvili, Unna, Telgte, Warendorf, etc.

At the beginning of the 12th century Adolf II of Berg donated the site of their old ancestral castle, Schloss Berg, to Cistercian monks from Burgundy. Adolf IV later built the Altenberg Abbey.

He had issue:

- Adolf III of Berg count of Berg and Hövel, Vogt of Werden (born 1080, died 12 October 1152).

Preceded by Adolf I of Berg	Count of Berg; 1082–1093	Succeeded by Adolf III
