= Frederick I (archbishop of Cologne) =

Archbishop of Cologne from 1100 (c. 1075–1131)

Frederick I (c. 1075 – 5 October 1131) was the Archbishop of Cologne from 1100 until his death.

Frederick I was a son of Count Berthold I of Schwarzenburg. He became a canon in Bamberg and Speyer.

Frederick was appointed Archbishop of Cologne in 1100 by the Holy Roman Emperor Henry IV. He supported Henry V's revolt against his father, despite the widespread support for Henry IV among the citizens of Cologne. In 1110 he conducted the wedding of Henry V and Matilda.

Shortly after gaining office, he began construction of the castle of Volmarstein. Frederick took part in drawing up the Concordat of Worms which ended the Investiture Controversy in 1122. Frederick elected Lothair of Saxony over Duke Frederick II of Swabia in 1125, after first offering the crown of Germany to Charles I the Good of Flanders. King Lothair secured the south of the archbishopric through the construction of a series of castles.

Frederick died in 1131, and was buried in Michaelsberg Abbey.

Preceded by Herman III	Archbishop of Cologne; 1100–1131	Succeeded by Bruno II
