= Adelaide of Lauffen =

German noblewoman

Adelaide of Lauffen (also Adelheid von Lauffen; c. 1060/1075 – after 1130) was a German noblewoman.

== Family background ==
Adelaide was the daughter of Count Henry II of Lauffen (d.1067) and his wife, Ida of Hövel (1030?-1090), daughter of Bernard I, count of Werl and Hövel. From her parents, Adelaide inherited Hövel, Unna, Telgte und Warendorf.

== Marriages and children ==
Adelaide was married twice. Around 1090, Adelaide married, as her first husband, Adolf II of Berg. With Adolf Adelaide had three sons:

- Adolf III of Berg
- Bruno of Berg, later archbishop of Cologne (r.1131-1137)
- Everhard/Eberhard, later abbot of the monastery of Georgenthal

After Adolf's death in 1106, Adelaide married Frederick I/V, count of Sommerschenburg, and count palatine of Saxony (r. 1111–1120). With Frederick, Adelaide had two children:

- Frederick II/VI of Sommerschenburg, count palatine of Saxony (d.1162), who married his niece, Lutgard of Salzwedel
- Adelaide, who married Goswin II of Heinsberg, and had two children with him: Goswin III of Heinsberg, and Philip of Heinsberg, later archbishop of Cologne (r.1167-1191).
