= Laufen =

Laufen may refer to:

- Laufen, Germany, a town in Upper Bavaria
- Laufen, Switzerland, a town in the canton of Basel-Country
  - Laufen District, around the town
- Laufen Hut, an Alpine hut in Austria
- Laufen, a village in the municipality of Laufen-Uhwiesen in the canton of Zurich, Switzerland
- Keramik Laufen, a Swiss ceramics manufacturer

== See also ==
- Laufen Castle (disambiguation)
- Lauffen (disambiguation)
