= Laufen Castle =

Laufen Castle (German: Schloss Laufen) may refer to:

- Laufen Castle (Germany), a castle in the German state of Bavaria, notable as the site of the Oflag VII-C prisoner of war camp
- Laufen Castle (Switzerland), a castle in the Swiss canton of Zurich overlooking the Rheinfalle falls on the River Rhine

== See also ==
- Laufen (disambiguation)
- Lauffen (disambiguation)
