= Diederik II of Limburg Hohenlimburg =

Diederik II Count of Limburg Hohenlimburg (1276 - 9 August 1364) was a son of Everhard I and Agnes (possibly a daughter of Dietrich I of Volmarstein).

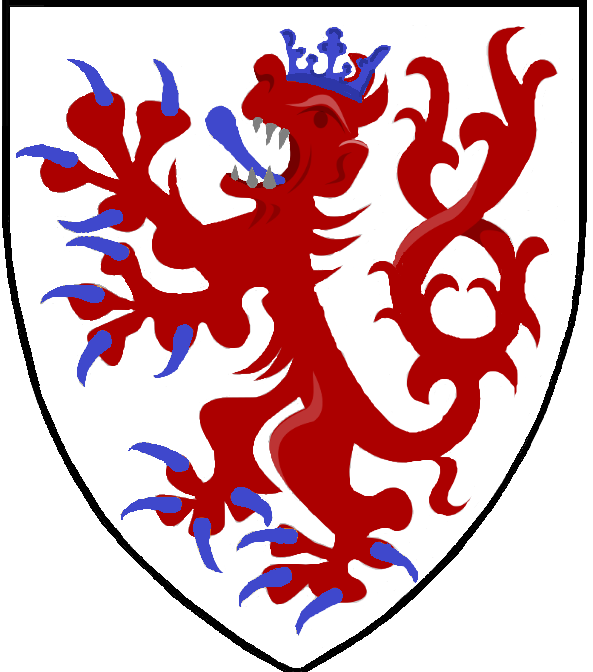
Coat of Arms souverain county of Limburg Lenne.

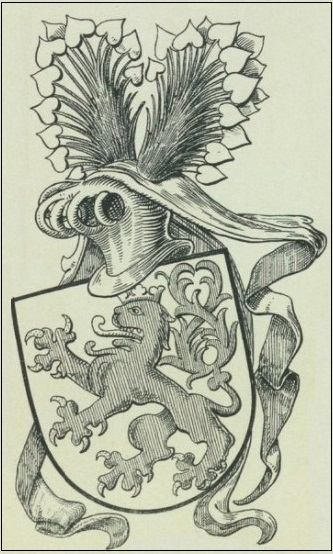
Chart of Theodericus II comes de Lymburg 1276 - 1364 Lion double tailed / Wappen der Deutschen Souveraine.

== Lifecycle ==
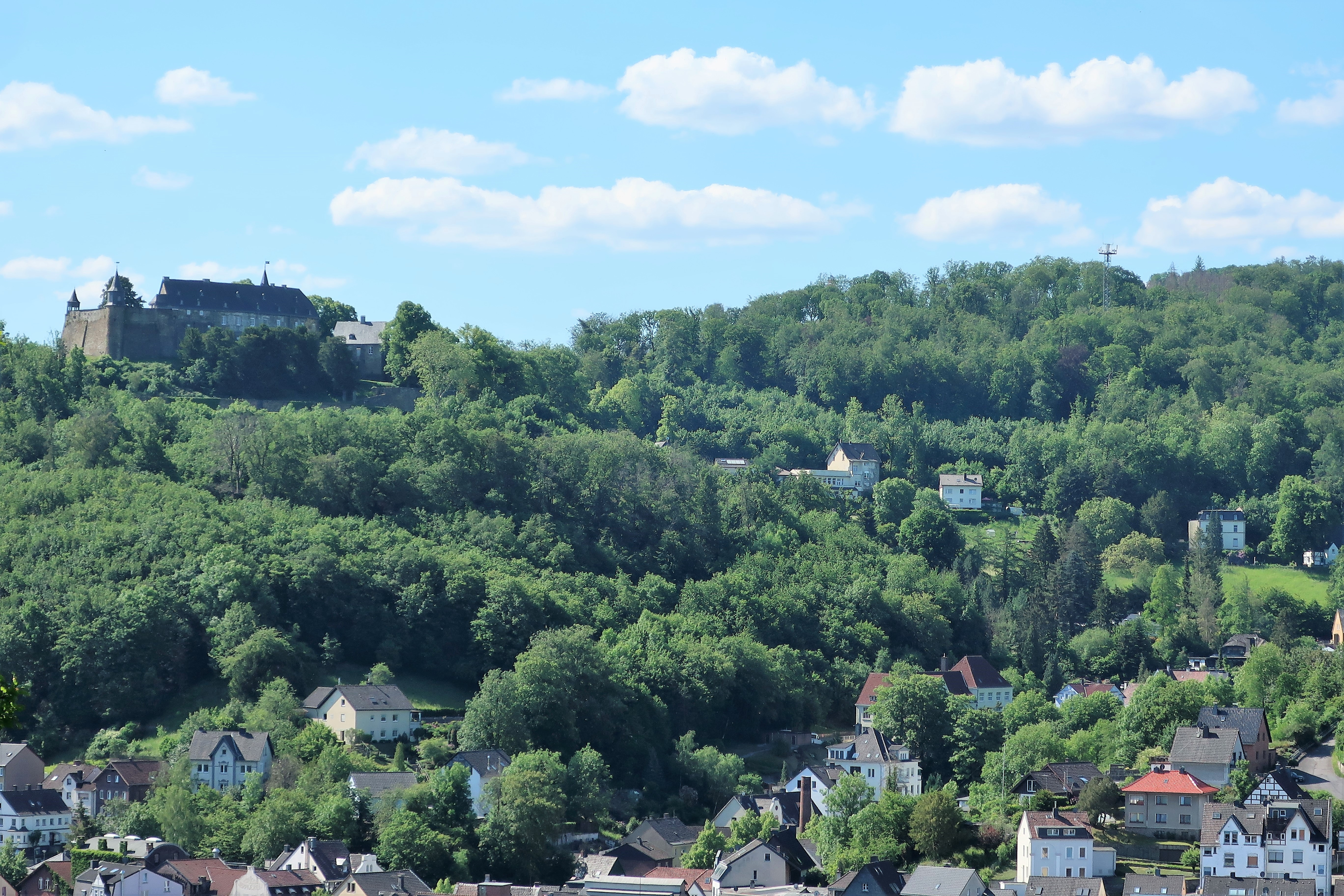
Castle Hohenlimburg at the Schleipenberg

Diederik married on September 16, 1297 to Irmgard of Greifenstein (widow of knight Hildeger Heinrich of Birklin, related to the family of Isenburg (not to be confused with Isenberg) daughter of Cracht of Greiffenstein. The castle was destroyed in 1298 by the counts of Nassau and Solms and not rebuilt. In 1315 Kraft (Cracht) of Greifenstein sold the ruined castle to the House of Habsburg. These ruins still exist. After his father Everhard I dies in 1308, he succeeds as Diederik II Count of Limburg Hohenlimburg. A heated conflict arises with the abbess. As a result, he and his wife Irmgard are excommunicated by the Archbishop of Cologne, Heinrich II of Virneburg. Only after some time do they receive absolution.

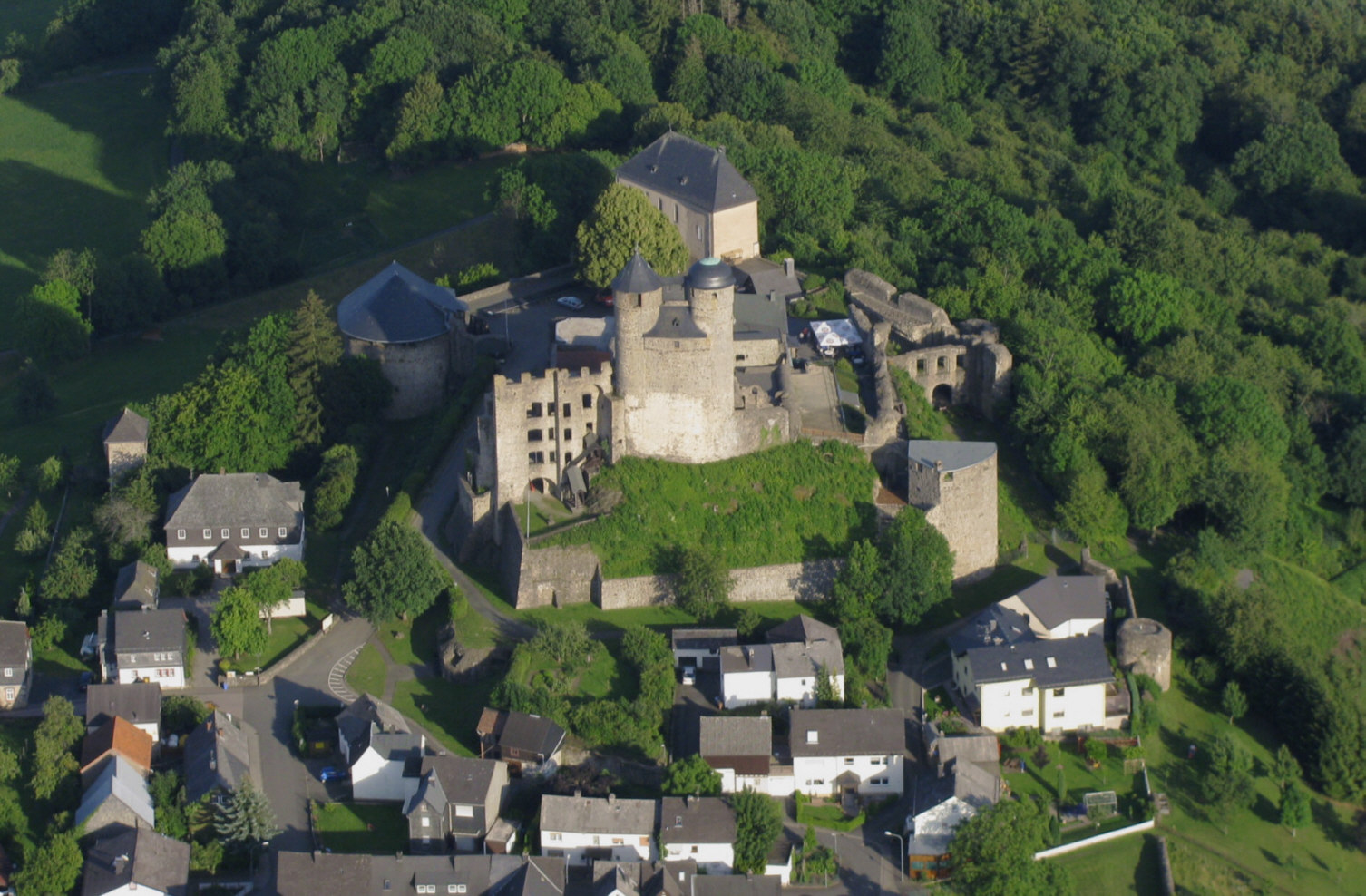
Ruin of the Castle of Greifenstein

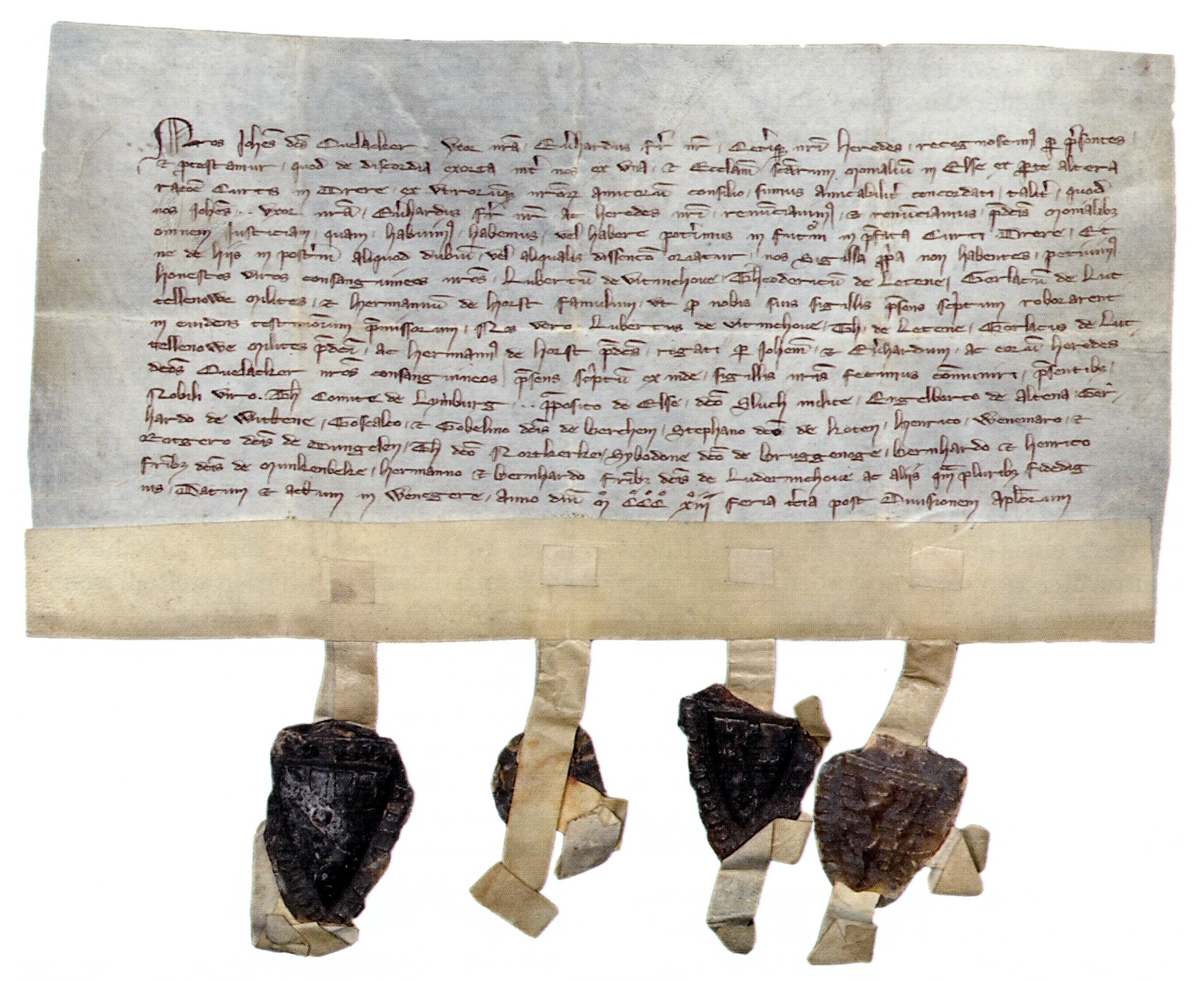
Waxseal of Dietrich II count of Limburg Hohenlimburg (right), treaty witness on 7 July 1313

Irmgard, who also had children from her first marriage, died in 1324. Nine years later Diederik remarries Elisabeth of Strünkede (widow of Hendrik of Friemersheim). Rights to Strünkede Castle, a fiefdom from Kleve, were bequeathed to her by Giselbert of Strünkede. Charters and deeds were written in the national language. 13 September 1333 Wi Dideric greue van Lymborch ende Lyse, onse wittelies wief, maken kont ende kenlic allen luden, die desen brief soelen sien of horen lesen, dat wi hebben ouerdraghen semelic mit enen moghenden man ende edelen Dideric greue van Cleue enre zuonen van aller aenspraec ende recht …. . Diederik also owed his office Amtmann of Recklinghausen to Elisabeth's legacy, “Theodericus comes de Limburg, tune temporis officialis in Recklinhusen”

== Covenant ==
In the following years, Diederik became involved in armed conflicts more than once. With knight Henrik of Gemen in the spring of 1340. His eldest son and intended successor, knight Everhart II, died on the 11th of November 1344. Diederik II with second cousins, the Lords of Limburg-Stirum and the Lords of Broich joined a covenant with William V, Duke of Jülich count of Berg and Ravensberg on November 6, 1348. This important covenant would later averted the threat when the succession by his grandson Diederick III came under pressure. Diederik in his capacity as Vogt of the nunnery of Rellinghausen and son Cracht, a canon from the Essen Abbey, announce on 11 March 1350 that they agree to accompany and protect the Jews Nathan, Lefman and Vyvus with their children in and out of their hometown Dortmund.

== Succession ==
Diederik II, who, like his grandfather Diederik I, would reach an old age of 88, survived his son 20 years, died on St. Laurentius evening 9 August 1364. Six years before his death on April 14, 1358, he made an arrangement for all his heirs with regard to his custody of Irentzel, Beke and Bruckhove (Brockhausen), custody from the Essen Abbey. His male heirs were his two grandsons. But due to the pre-death of their father Everhard II, the county of Limburg and the Hohenlimburg according to opponents, an “offen void huys”, that is to say a fief that finished. Diederik managed to avert that threat. Grandson Diederik III, who signed his charters together with his grandfather, succeeds him in 1364. He soon married Lukardis heiress of Broich and managed to expand his territory and influence considerably with the Lordship about properties, the grounds and castle Broich.

== Marriage and offspring ==
Diederik II count of Limburg was married to Irmgard of Greifenstein with whom he had 10 children, Everhard, Diederik, Hendrik, Jutta, Agnes, Kraft, Elisabeth, Irmgard, Johanna and Adelheid. At the age of 57 he remarries Elisabeth, heiress of Strünkede, with her he had no children.

- Everhard ca. 1298 died 11 November 1344. Married to Jutta of Sayn.
- Diederik c. 1299-1338
- Hendrik c. 1299-1324
- Jutta ca. 1301-1368 Abbess or the Nunnery of Herdecke. Married Dietrich of Wickede in 1322
- Agnes born ca.1302
- Kraft ca.1303-1350 Canon at Abbey of Essen
- Elisabeth ca. 1304 April 2, 1358. In 1329 married Herman of Münster at Meinhoven
- Irmgard ca. 1305 Nun at the Nunnery of Essen
- Johanna c. 1307
- Adelaide ca.1309

== Literature ==
- Staatskanzlei. 1990 [German] Schlösser, Burgen, alte Mauern. Herausgegeben vom Hessendienst der Staatskanzlei, Wiesbaden, 1990, pp. 148–150, ISBN 3-89214-017-0.
- Aders, A. 1963 [German] Die Geschichte der Grafen und Herren van Limburg (Hohenlimburg-Broich und Herren) Limburg-Styrum und ihrer Besitzungen. 1200-1550 Teil II Band 3 Register
- Berg,A. 1964. [German] Archive fur Sippenforschung Heft 14. Jahrgang 30. Mai 1964
- Korteweg, K.N. 1964.[Dutch] De Nederlandse Leeuw Jaargang LXXXI no.8 August 1964.
- Bleicher, W. 1993 [German] Monatsschrift des Vereins für Orts- und Heimatkunde Hohenlimburg e.V. “Geschichte der Grafschaft Limburg”. Hohenlimburger Heimatblätter. Jg., 1993 Heft Mai.

== Sources ==
- Bleicher, W. / Van Limburg H., 1998-2004 [German / Dutch] Neue Aspekte der Geschichte der Grafen von Hohen-Limburg und ihrer Nachkommen. In: Hohenlimburger Heimatblätter, Teil 1: 59, 3/1998, S. 81–93; Teil 2: 59, 6/1998, S. 201–213; Teil 3: 59, 8/1998, S. 281–294, 307–311; Teil 4: 63, 10/2002, S. 364–375, 386–390; Teil 5: 64, 2003, S. 210–214, 226-230 & Hefte (2004) Seite 70–79.
- Van Limburg, H. 2016 [German]. Graven van Limburg Hohenlimburg & Broich.(2016) Regesten DL01 & DL02. Volume with 2010 Charter and Deed registers. ISBN 978-94-92185-60-0
