= Bruno II von Berg =

Archbishop of Cologne

Bruno II von Berg (died 29 May 1137) served as the Archbishop of Cologne from 1131, until his death in 1137. Bruno II was a son of Count Adolf III of Berg. In 1119, he was mentioned as a Provost in Cologne, and he became the provost of St. Gereon in Cologne in 1127. In 1130, he was elected the Archbishop of Trier, but refused.

Bruno was selected on Christmas Day of 1131 by King Lothar of Germany and a papal legate as the Archbishop of Cologne. In 1133, he converted his own keep at Altenberg into a monastery. Bruno died in 1137 in Apulia on a campaign with King Lothair of Germany against Roger II of Sicily.

Catholic Church titles
Preceded by Frederick I	Archbishop of Cologne; 1131–1137	Succeeded by Hugo von Sponheim
