= Diederik III count of Limburg Hohenlimburg and Broich =

Diederik III of Limburg Hohenlimburg, born around 1328, was the eldest son of Everhard II van Limburg Hohenlimburg and Juta of Sayn. Twenty years later he followed the 9th of August 1364 his grandfather Diederik II count of Limburg Hohenlimburg. In 1366 Diederik III became the Amtmann of Angermünde, the district between Duisburg and Düsseldorf. As the successor to lord Diederik III of Broich, who five years later would become his father-in-law. He also was Voght of the Rellinghausen Abbey. On 3 July 1371 Diederik married Ludgardis (Lukarda) daughter of Diederik of Broich and Katharina of Steinfurt. Lukarda was heiress of the Lordship Broich. At his wedding, he received a dowry of 1,600 old gold shields.

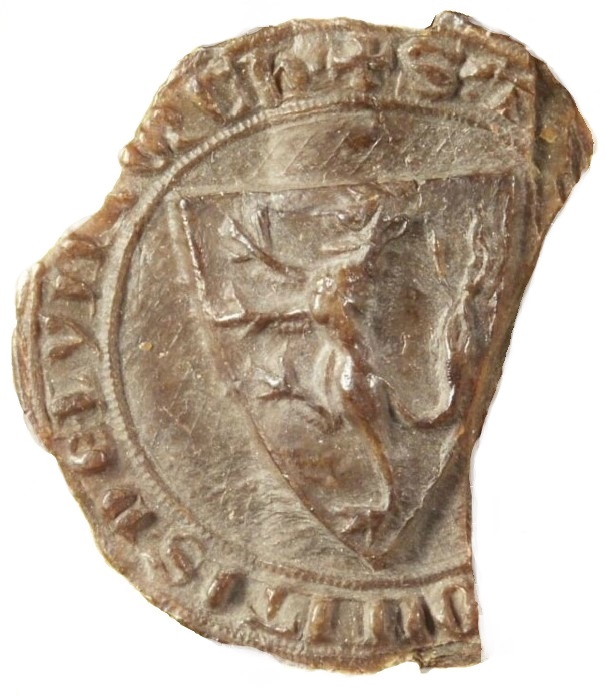
Waxseal of Diederik III count of Limburg Hohenlimburg and Broich

== Castle of Vittinghoven. ==
Near the ruins of Neu Isenburg on the river Ruhr, once built on allodial ground by his ancestor Diederik I count of Limburg Hohenlimburg, Vitinghoven was located at the wood of Kortenbusch. Diederik III has guardianship rights and on January 2, 1370 he buys the fortified house from the brothers Johan and Hendrik of Vitinchoven. He appoints Johan of Vitinchoven as house lord, with the assignment to further strengthen the house. The building material was presumably taken from the nearby ruin Neu Isenburg.

== Fief of the Duchy of Berg ==
On February 5, 1377, the fief letter with the duke of Berg is drawn up and ratified by Diederik on 6 May. On September 28, 1380, Diederik III made an arrangement with his Viscounts at Broich Castle, Diederik of Elverfeld called Sobbe, Bernt of Broich, Evert of Gerscheit and Godert Schele. On September 10, 1382, after mediation with duke Willem of Gullick, Diederik reached an agreement with his brother-in-law of Wevelinghoven, with whom he had a disagreement. It was made clear that Diederik owns the Lordship and castle of Broich with all property to the right of the Rhine and Frederik the patronage of the church in Hemmerden, part income of the toll at Rheinberg and the Broich estates to the left of the River Rhine.

== The Abbey of Essen ==
Kusteress of the nearby nunnery of Essen was Diederick's aunt Lysa of Broich who died in 1370. Her niece Irmgard of Broich was abbess (1360–1370). After Diederick's death in May 1401, his sons Willem and Diederik made an arrangement with their mother Lukarda on September 7, 1403, whereby she continued to live at castle Broich together with a maid and servant. She received a yearly allowance from 54 old Schilden. Some years later she joined the Rellinghausen Abbey and stayed there until her death in 1412. Her daughter Margaretha, a nun of the Abbey of Essen, was Proposes of the Rellinghausen monastery. She was elected abbess of the Abbey of Essen. As a result, a disagreement arose with Elisabeth of Beeck, who claimed the office of Abbess for herself. In history known the 2nd Abbesses Turmoil in the Essen nunnery.

== Westphalian Land Peace. ==
On August 21, 1385, Diederik agrees to a covenant on the preservation of Westphalian land peace that earlier on July 29, 1385. was closed between Westphalian lords, cities and the Archbishop of Cologne. It is mutually agreed that the Allies will individually supply a number of warriors for a joint battle group to safeguard the agreement. Duke of Berg, Count of Ravensberg and Blankenberg, Counts of Nassau, Mark, Waldeck, Teckelenburg, Hoya, Schauenberg, Katzenellenbogen, Everstein, Bentheim, Rietberg, Delmenhorst, Limburg Hohenlimburg Broich and further the lords of Diepholt, Dietz, Steinfurt, Solms, Wildenberg and the guardian of Berg take part in this peace covenant. Later on joined by the count of Mark and his brother the Adolf, duke of Cleves.

== Castle of Broich located on the border of Territories. ==
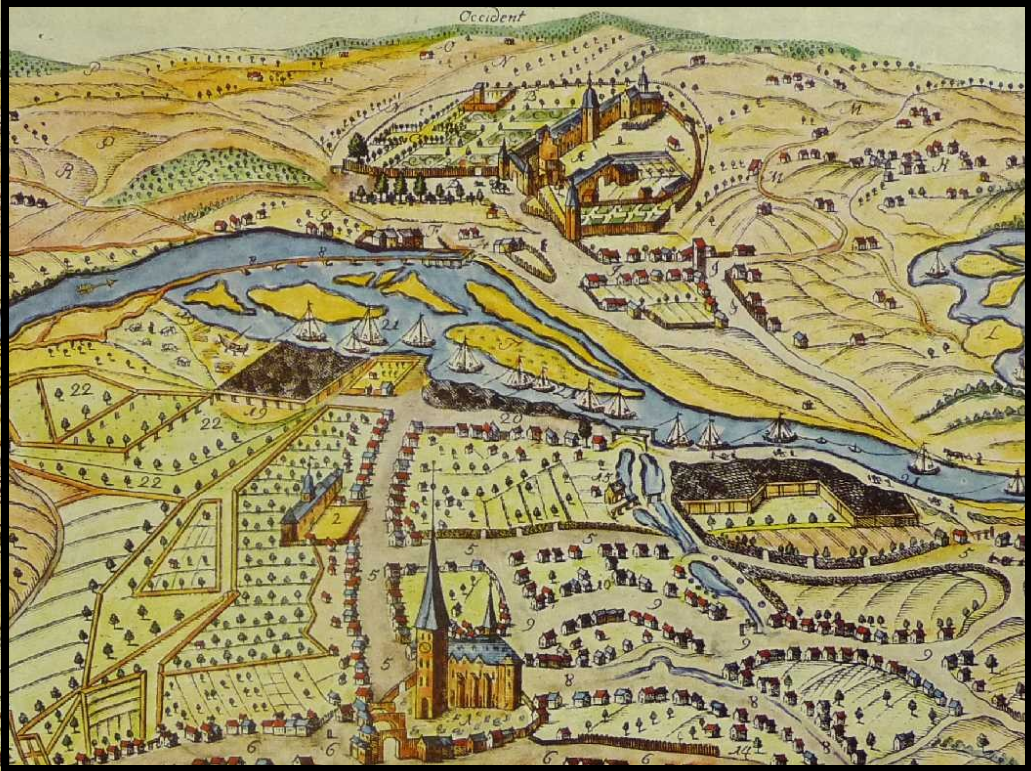
Birdview of castle Broich and Mulheim on the river Ruhr

Due to the strategic location of Broich on the border of 5 territories including the Duchy of Cleves and Duchy of Berg, the count of Limburg Hohenlimburg Broich and sons in 1396 were faced with a dilemma. Until then they were on good terms with count Diederik of Mark. However, duke Willem of Berg comes into open conflict with duke Adolf I of Cleves, brother and ally of the count of Mark. Due to the loan bond with Berg, Diederik and Willem see themselves on December 28, 1396 forced to assist the Duke of Berg in his fight against count Diederik of Mark. In the spring of 1397 the battle broke out. The Bergse troops near the city of Cleves were defeated. Captured men and knights had to ransom themselves for large sums of money. The Berg alliance fell apart after the three sons of duke Willem of Berg, Gerhard, Adolf and Willem turned against their father who was forced to give up his territories to his sons. Count Adolf of Berg, assisted by knight Evert of Limburg, lord of Hardenberg (Velbert) and his uncle Diederik III count of Limburg Hohenlimburg Broich, fought on. Count Diederik of der Mark was wounded and died in 1398. His brother duke Adolf of Cleves then inherited the entire County of Mark. On December 21, 1399, the battle flares up again after John II, Count of Nassau-Siegen and brother Engelbert I of Nassau announce, together with their cousin count Diederik III of Limburg Hohenlimburg Broich, that they are enemies of the Archbishop of Cologne. A short time later Diederik probably died of wounds sustained during fighting against Cologne troops.

== Peace with the Archbishop of Cologne. ==
The brothers Willem I and Diederik IV of Limburg-Hohenlimburg Broich succeeded their deceased father. Willem I of Gullick, duke of Berg and Ravensberg returned the county of Limburg with the lordship of Broich back as fief of the Duchy of Berg. A peace agreement was made with the Cologne Archbishop on March 29, 1402. Over a period of three years, the Of Limburg's have to pay 1,000 heavy Rhine guilders as compensation and promise not to fight against the archbishop, his cities or subjects anymore. On December 4, 1412, the brothers Willem and Diederik IV mutually agreed to an agreement whereby they divided the estate of their father. Willem went on to live on the Hohenlimburg and Diederik in Broich Castle.

== Marriage and offspring ==
Diederik III count of Limburg was married to Lukarda of Broich with whom he had 8 children, Elisabeth, Willem (I), Diederick (IV), Anna, Lukarda, Margaretha, Jutta and Agnes.

1. Elisabeth, died 1396 Married Dietrich of Volmestein
2. Willem (I) died 28.02.1459 Married Metza of Reifferscheid, erbin of Bedburg.
3. Diederik(IV) died 16.01.1444 married Henrica of Wisch
4. Anna Married Bernd of Hörde
5. Lukarda Nun at the Abbey of Essen
6. Margaretha Nun at St, Gacilien at Cologne
7. Jutta Married Bern of Strünkede
8. Agnes Married Heinrich of Ahaus

== Literature ==
- Von Kamp, H.A.(1852) Das Schloss Broich und die Herrschaft Broich. Eine Sammlung geschichtlicher Merkwürdigkeiten. Theil. I Duisburg : 1852. Düsseldorf : Universitäts- und Landesbibliothek, 2011
- Redling, O.(1939) Mülheim an der Ruhr – Seine Geschichte von den Anfängen bis zum Übergang an Preußen 1815. Stadt Mülheim an der Ruhr im Selbstverlag, Mülheim an der Ruhr 1939.
- Binding, G.(1970) Schloss Broich in Mülheim/Ruhr. (Kunst und Altertum am Rhein. Nr. 23, ISSN 0075-725X) Rheinland-Verlag, Düsseldorf 1970.
- Ortmanns, K.(1985) Schloss Broich in Mülheim an der Ruhr. Rheinische Kunststätten, Heft 77. Köln 1985.
- Mostert, R.A.(2008) Broich: Burg, Schloss, Residenz. In: Zeugen der Stadtgeschichte / Baudenkmäler und historische Orte in Mülheim an der Ruhr. Verlag Klartext, Essen 2008.
- Wisplinghoff, E.:(1960) Der Kampf um die Vogtei des Reichsstiftes Essen im Rahmen der allgemeinen Vogteientwicklung des 10. bis 12 Jahrhunderts. Aus Geschichte und Landeskunde. Festschrift Franz Steinbach. Bonn 1960
- Korteweg, K.N.(1964)[Dutch] De Nederlandse Leeuw Jaargang LXXXI no.8 August 1964. Correction of the genealogical tree of the house of lords of Limburg-Styrum and the genealogical tree of the ruling counts of Limburg Hohenlimburg, Lords of Broich, period 1300–1508.
- Van Limburg, H.(2016) [Dutch].Graven van Limburg Hohenlimburg & Broich. ISBN 978-94-92185-59-4
- Kleij, S.(1970) Zeitschrift für Bergische Geschichtsvereins dl. XXXV (1970) "Der Besitz der Stiffter, Essen und Rellinghausen"
- Kohl, W.(1982) Monastisches Westfalen. Kloster und Stifte 800-1800. Münster 1982.
- Weigel, H.(1960) Die Grundherrschaften des Frauenstiftes Essen 1960. Beitrage zu Geschichte von Stadt und Stift Essen nr. 76.
- Bleicher, W. 1993 [German] Monatsschrift des Vereins für Orts- und Heimatkunde Hohenlimburg e.V. Geschichte der Grafschaft Limburg. Hohenlimburger Heimatblätter. Jg., 1993 Heft Mai.
- Bleicher, W. / Van Limburg H., 1998-2004 [German / Dutch] Neue Aspekte der Geschichte der Grafen von Hohen-Limburg und ihrer Nachkommen. In: Hohenlimburger Heimatblätter, Teil 1: 59, 3/1998, S. 81–93; Teil 2: 59, 6/1998, S. 201–213; Teil 3: 59, 8/1998, S. 281–294, 307–311; Teil 4: 63, 10/2002, S. 364–375, 386–390; Teil 5: 64, 2003, S. 210–214, 226-230 & Hefte (2004) Seite 70–79.
- Dohmen, K. Zeune, J.: Schloss Hardenberg. Neue Erkenntnisse zur Bausgeschichte einer rheinischen Wasserburg. 2016, S. 266.

== Sources ==
1. STADTARCHIV MUHLHEIM Bestand Herschaft Broich
2. KREMER, J.C. Akademische Beitragen zur Gülich und Bergischen Geschichte. Band II, seite 58. Original Charter in Stadtarchiv Mülheim Bestand Herrschaft
3. SCHUBERT Published by Nr. Original Charter in Stadtarchiv Mülheim Bestand Herrschaft Broich.
4. STAATS ARCHIVE DUSSELDORFF Written on paper end 15th century.
5. HAEBERLIN Published in Analecta mediaevi 357–374
6. VAN LIMBURG, H.[GERMAN].[HVL DL01;RG:date] 2010 Charters and Deeds ISBN 978-94-92185-60-0
7. SEIBERTZ, J.S Published in Urkunde Buch zur Landes und Rechtsgeschichte des Herzogtums Westfalen III.
8. LACOMBLET, T.H. First Published; Urkundenbuch für die Geschichte des Niederrhein.(1840) Universitats Bibliotheek 4 Band III.
9. ARCHIEF BENTHEIM TECKLENBURG First Published; Limburger Lehnscopiar, zu Rheda (1964) Limburger Urkunden.
10. STAATS ARCHIVE DUSSELDORFF Published SCHUBERT Original in Kurkoln Urkunden.
