= Adolf III of Berg =

Count of Berg (c. 1090-1152)

Count of Berg
- Predecessor: Adolf II
- Successor: Adolf IV
- Born: c. 1090
- Died: 12 October 1152
- Spouse: Adelheid of Cleves
- Issue: Adolf IV of Berg; Eberhard of Berg; Bruno II of Berg; Gisela of Berg
- House: House of Berge
- Father: Adolf II of Berg-Hövel
- Mother: Adelheid von Laufen

Adolf III of Berg (c. 1090 – 12 October 1152) was count of Berg from 1093 until 1132, and count of Hövel from 1090 until 1106, and Vogt of Werden. He was the son of Adolf II of Berg-Hövel, count of Berg, and Adelaide of Lauffen. Adolf III, Count of Berg is named Adolf I, Count of Berg in the Netherlands and in Germany.

He married Adelheid of Cleves (von Kleve), possibly a daughter of Dietrich II count of Cleves (died 1118).

They had issue:

- Adolf IV of Berg count of Berg and count of Altena (died after 1161);
- Eberhard of Berg, monk in Morimont, 1st Abbot of Georgenthal (1143–1152) in Thüringen (born 1090/95, died 1152, buried in Altenberg (Gedenktag katholisch: 22. Juli - "Er bewog seinen Bruder, dem Orden 1133 auch das von der Familie gestiftete Kloster in Altenberg zu übertragen. Eberhard wurde dann 1143 Abt in dem von seinem Schwager gestifteten Kloster Georgenthal bei Gotha");
- Bruno II of Berg, Archbishop of Cologne between 1131 and 1137 (died in Trani, Italy 30 May 1137, buried in Bari);
- Gisela of Berg, married Sizzo count von Schwarzburg (died 1160).

Preceded by Adolf II	Count of Berg; 1093–1132	Succeeded by Adolf IV
