= Everhard II van Limburg Hohenlimburg =

Eldest son of Diederik II count of Limburg Hohenlimburg

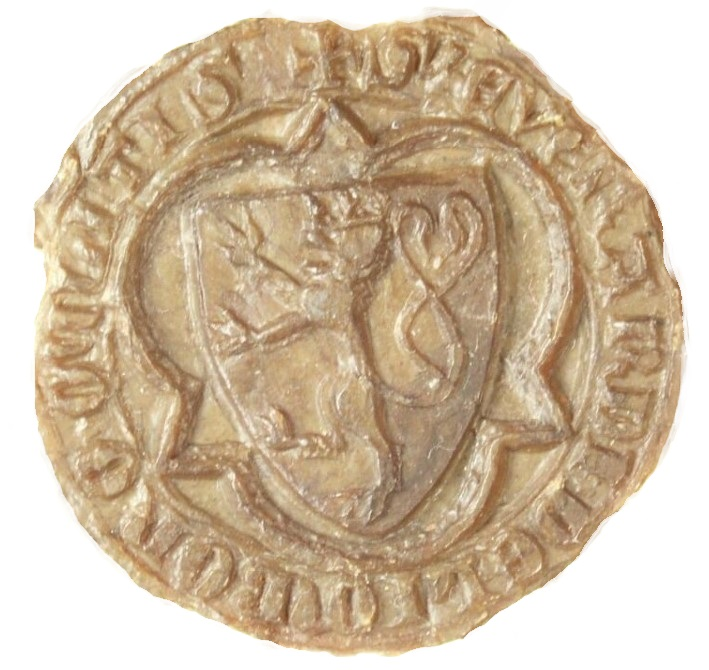
Waxseal Everhard II of Limburg Hohenlimburg

Everhard II Knight of Limburg Hohenlimburg (1298 - 11 November 1344) was the eldest son of Diederik II count of Limburg Hohenlimburg and Irmgard of Greifenstein, intended as a successor. Together with his brothers Kraft and Diederik, he is mentioned in their father's charters from 1324 onwards. But due to his early death, Everhard did not manage the county of Limburg independently as count. Around 1326 he married Jutta of Sayn, daughter of Engelbrecht II, Count of Sayn Homburg, and with her had two sons Diederik and Johan. Their great-uncles Hendrik and Diederik had previously died without descendants, while Everhard's uncle Kraft was canon of the abbey of Essen, and thus unmarried. The brothers were therefore in line to become direct heirs to their grandfather in 1364. Canon Kraft, then co-regent and guardian of his nephews, took care of the transfer of the county.

== The patronage of Mülheim ==
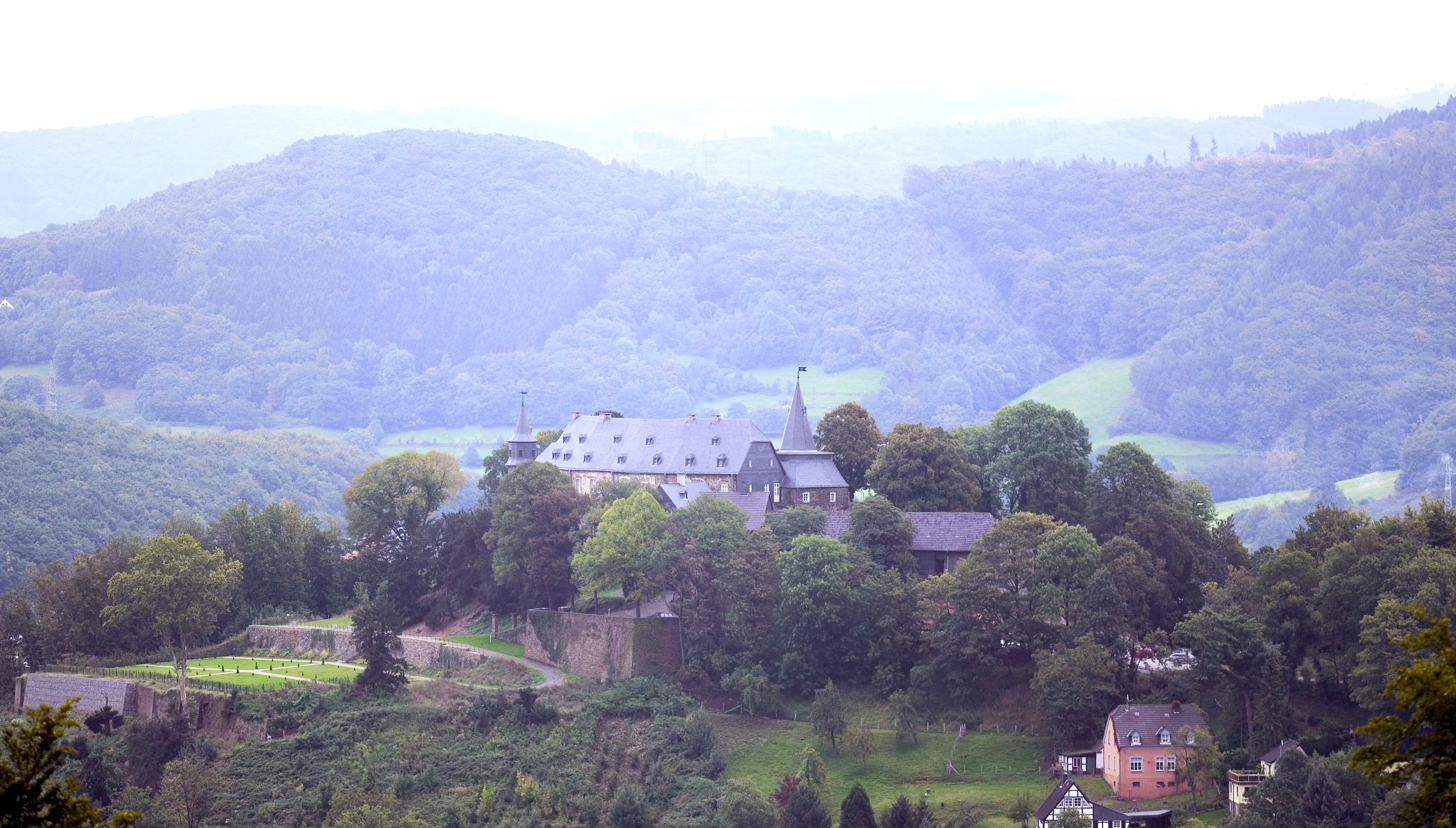
Castle Hohenlimburg on the Schliepenberg

In May 1330 a legal dispute arose between the second cousins the lords of Limburg Stirum and the lord of Broich. The dispute was about the patronage of the church of Mülheim. At the request of mediators, after examining old rights, the judge of Kettwick on May 29, 1330, ruled in favor of Count Diederik von Limburg Hohenlimburor a long time to come. This lasted until the 17th century when it turned out that there was a country-administrative political element too. In 1333 the Limburg father and son were involved as mediators in a conflict within the family von Münster about land property involving their sister Else, her children and her husband Herman von Münster.

== Beginning of Hundred Years' War (1337-1453) ==
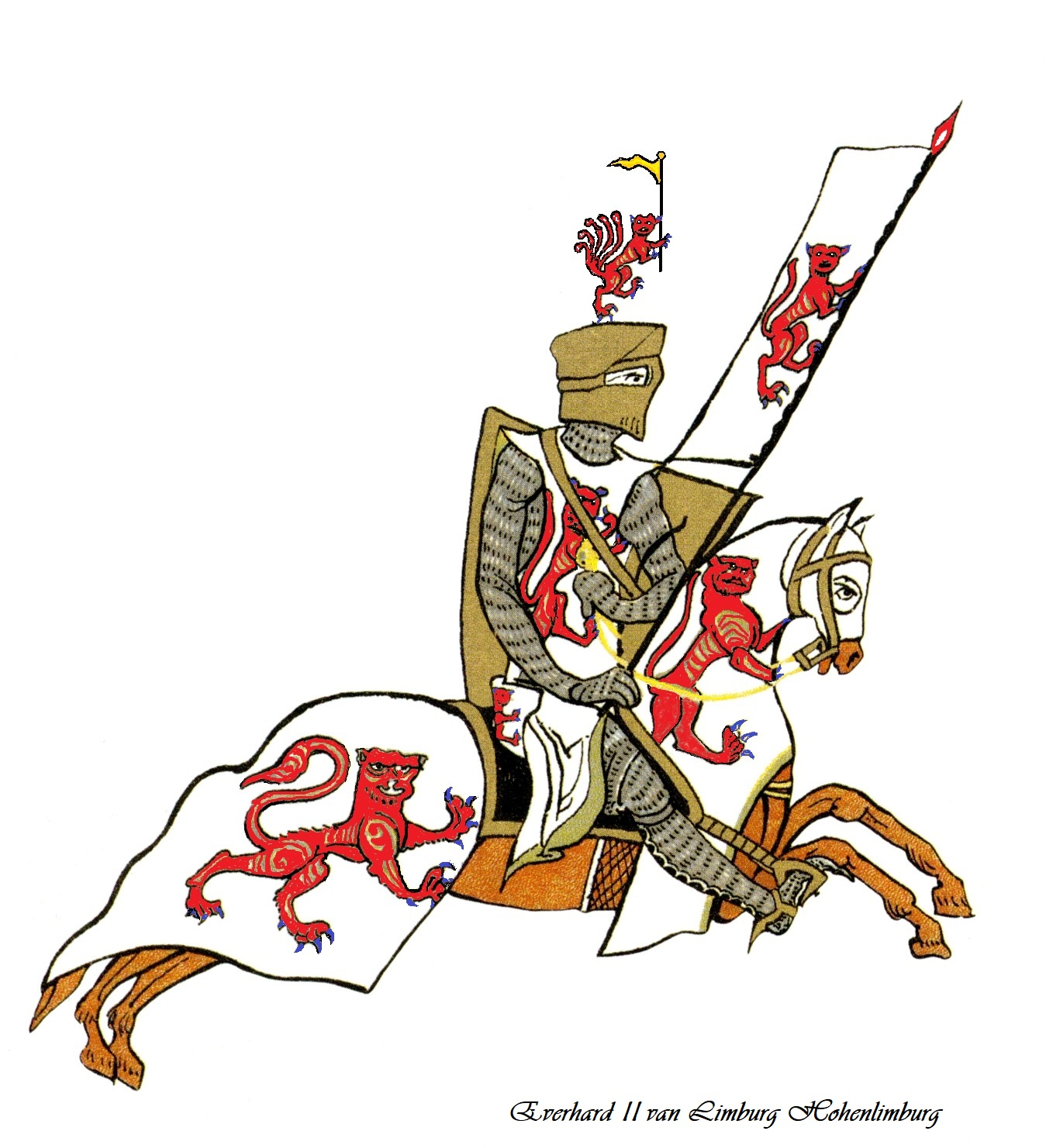
Everhard II knight of Limburg Hohenlimburg

Everhard was involved as a knight in many armed engagements in the first half of the 14th century. The years from 1337 onwards are seen as the initial phase of the later so-called Hundred Years War. Since autumn 1336 there had been a lively exchange of messengers between the young English King Edward III (1310–1377) and continental princes. Through extensive promises to pay, the Englishman was able to sign an agreement with almost all of the great by the end of 1337. On May 26, 1337, Everhard of Limburg Hohenlimburg became a vassal of king Eduard III. Count Reinoud II of Gelre,“the Black” of Guelders, had married Edward's sister a few years earlier. He acted in the river Rhein region as a sort of subcontractor for his brother-in-law, to recruit nobles as vassals for Edward. On May 26 “Datum apud Westmonasterium vicesimo sexto Maii” he was ordered to pay Everhard of Limburg 100 small florins.

== Diplomatic missions of King Edward in the Rhein region ==
From July 1338 Edward III undertook an important diplomatic and military missions on the continent, to obtain the French royal crown. Which he claimed as grandson of the French king. Accompanied by his representative court, on his way to the island of Niederwerth located downstream near Koblenz, he had taken the route from Antwerp via Jülich, Cologne, Bonn, Sinzig and Andernach. On his way he was accompanied by local knights through unfamiliar terrain. While staying in the city of Cologne the town provided a protective team for the night hours. Eduard was the guest of his brother-in-law Wilhelm von Jülich. From August 30 until September 7, 1338, the English royal court stayed in Koblenz. Six bishops and 37 counts, barons and knights also came there together. At the Reichstag in Koblenz in 1338 Emperor Ludwig IV appointed Edward III Imperial Vicar, but in April 1341 Ludwig the Bavarian took back the vicariate given to the Englishman.

== Succession ==
Everhard II of Limburg Hohenlimburg died on November 11, 1344, before a very large plague epidemic (1348–1350) broke out in Western Europe. His father Diederik II his ensured that daughter-in-law Jutta, together with her young sons Diederik and Johan, were able to live at the Steynhus estate in Heyst near Essen., receiving 1/3 of the proceeds from their property in Brockhusen. Jutta died in 1380 at the age of more than 80 years old. In the meantime her son had succeeded as count Diederik III of Limburg Hohenlimburg and Broich, and Johan as Johan I lord of Limburg Hardenberg, a castle and lordship between the river Ruhr and the Wupper.

== Marriage and offspring ==
Everhard II of Limburg Hohenlimburg and his wife Jutta of Sayn and had two sons Diederik and Johan.

- Diederik III ca. 1328 - 18 May 1401. Married on 3 July 1371 to Lukardis heiress of Broich. He became Count of Limburg, lord of Broich. He was also Amtmann in Angermunde.
- Johan ca. 1332 - July 4, 1410. Married Petronella of Lethmate. He became lord of Hardenberg, a lordship between Ruhr and Wupper and was co-owner of the castle Hohenlimburg.

== Literature ==
- Andre, E, (1996) Ein Königshof auf Reisen. Der Kontinent Aufenthalt Eduards III. von England 1338–1340, Köln/Weimar/Wien 1996.
- Bock, F. (1956) Das deutsch-englische Bündnis von 1335–1342, München 1956.
- Binding, G.: (1970) Schloss Broich in Mülheim/Ruhr. (= Kunst und Altertum am Rhein. Nr. 23, ISSN 0075-725X) Rheinland-Verlag, Düsseldorf 1970.
- Mostert, R.A.: (2008) Broich: Burg, Schloss, Residenz. In: Zeugen der Stadtgeschichte / Baudenkmäler und historische Orte in Mülheim an der Ruhr. Verlag Klartext, Essen 2008.
- Korteweg, K.N. 1964.[Dutch] De Nederlandse Leeuw Jaargang LXXXI no.8 August 1964.
- Van Limburg, H. 2016 [Dutch]. Graven van Limburg Hohenlimburg & Broich. ISBN 978-94-92185-59-4 [HVL R01 RG:date] Regesten 01 & 02. ISBN 978-94-92185-60-0

== Sources ==
- Bleicher, W. / Van Limburg H., 1998-2004 [German / Dutch] Neue Aspekte der Geschichte der Grafen von Hohen-Limburg und ihrer Nachkommen. In: Hohenlimburger Heimatblätter, Teil 1: 59, 3/1998, S. 81–93; Teil 2: 59, 6/1998, S. 201–213; Teil 3: 59, 8/1998, S. 281–294, 307–311; Teil 4: 63, 10/2002, S. 364–375, 386–390; Teil 5: 64, 2003, S. 210–214, 226-230 & Hefte (2004) Seite 70–79.
- Van Limburg H. [German] In: Hohenlimburger Heimatblätter. Oktober 2024 Jahrgang 85. Leserbriefe. Heft 10/2024, S.356–360

== Further references ==
1. Charter: 1330.05.29 Published in Akademische Beitragen zur Gülich und Bergischen Geschichte KREMER, J.C.(1770). Band II, seite 142. Handwriting by Schubert in Stadtarchiv Mülheim Bestand Herrschaft Broich. Urkunde 1010/1449. Summa also Published (2016) HVL R01:RG:1330.05.29
2. Urkundensammlung 1675. Nr. XIV SETHE. Legal conferences on the rights of Broich Castle. Held in 1505 Deutz, 1507 Cologne, 1512 Essen, 1515 Neusz, 1525 Cologne, 1529 Neusz, 1555 Bacharach. Summary Jur.dr. Voets 1675. Also Published (2016) HVL R01:RG: 1505–155
3. Charter: 1337.05.26 First publicated Codex Germania Diplomata II Page 1578, LUNIG, J.CH. Also Publicated (2016) HVL R01:RG:1337.05.26
4. Bestand 623, Nr. 4148 (ältestes Koblenzer Stadtbuch). STADTARCHIV KOBLENZ
5. Publikation Die Besuche mittelalterlicher Herrscher in Bonn SCHIEFFER, R. (1985), in: Bonner Geschichtsblätter 37 (1985) (1989), S. 7-40.
6. Charter: 1344.10.11. Leiningensches Archiv ARCHIV AMORBACH Princely Leiningen's archive in Amorbach Urkunde 1344.10.11 Lordship Broich. Also Publicated (2016) HVL R01:RG:1344.10.11
