= List of states in the Holy Roman Empire (L) =

This is a list of states in the Holy Roman Empire beginning with the letter L. Some historians mark the beginning of the Empire as 800, with the coronation of Frankish king Charlemagne ("Charles the Great").

Name	Type	Imperial circle	Imperial diet	History
Lage	Lordship			
Landau	Imperial City	Upp Rhen	RH	1260: Built by Leiningen-Landeck; 1291: Free Imperial City; 1324: To the Bishopric of Speyer; 1511: Free Imperial City; 1648: To France; 1815: To Austria; 1816: To Bavaria
Landsberg in Alsace	Lordship; 1583: Barony	n/a	n/a	1234: First mentioned; to Lords of Landsberg; 1281: To Austria; 1363: Sold to Rappoltstein; 1398: To Lupfen (state); 1563: To Schwendi; 1568: HRE Baron; 1697: To France
Landsberg in Saxony	Margraviate	n/a	n/a	1170: Built and title held by Meissen; 1261: Partitioned from Meissen; 1291: Extinct; to Meissen then sold to Brandenburg; 1341: To Meissen
Langwies	Jurisdiction			
Lauenburg see: Saxe-Lauenburg				
Laurenburg	County	n/a	n/a	1093: First mentioned 1159: Partitioned into itself and Nassau; 1197: Extinct; to Nassau
Lausanne	Prince-Bishopric	n/a		517: Formed; 1270: HRE Prince of the Empire; 1536: To Bern
Lausanne	Imperial City	n/a		1434: Formed; 1536: To Bern
Lavant (St. Andra)	Prince-Bishopric	Aust	n/a	1228: Formed; 15th Century: HRE Prince of the Empire; no secular territory Originally represented in the Austrian Circle
Leas	County	n/a	n/a	1529: Formed; 1597: became an unlanded title
Leiningen	County	n/a	n/a	early 12th Century: Formed; 1128: 1st mentioned c. 1212: Extinct; to Saarbrücken-Hardenburg who assumed the name Leiningen; 1241: Acquired Dagsburg; 1237: Partitioned into Leiningen-Dagsburg and Leiningen-Landeck
Leiningen; Prince of Leiningen, Count-Palatine of Mosbach, Lord of Miltenberg, Amorbach, Düren, Bischofsheim, Hardheim & Lauda, etc.	Principality	Upp Rhen	PR	1803: Formed for Leiningen-Dagsburg-Hardenburg; 1806: To Baden
Leiningen-Billigheim; Count of Leiningen, Lord of Billigheim, Allfeld, Mühlbach, Katzenthal, and Neuburg at the Neckar, Count of Dagsburg & Aspremont	County	Upp Rhen	WT	1803: Renamed from Leiningen-Guntersblum; 1806: To Baden
Leiningen-Dagsburg (Leiningen-Dachsburg)	County; 1444: Landgraviate; 1658: County	Upp Rhen	WT	1237: Partitioned from Leiningen; 1317: Partitioned into itself and Leiningen-Hardenburg; 1444: HRE Landgrave; 1467: Extinct; Most to Runkel-Westerburg who assumed the name Leiningen-Westerburg, Dagsburg to Leiningen-Hardenburg who assumed the name Leiningen-Dachsburg-Hartenburg; 1658: Partitioned from Leiningen-Dagsburg-Falkenburg; 1706: Extinct; to Leiningen-Heidesheim
Leiningen-Dagsburg-Falkenburg	County	Upp Rhen	WT	1560: Renamed from Leiningen-Dagsburg-Hardenburg; 1658: Partitioned into Leiningen-Heidesheim, Leiningen-Dagsburg and Leiningen-Guntersblum
Leiningen-Dagsburg-Hardenburg	County; 1779: Principality	Upp Rhen	WT	1467: Renamed from Leiningen-Hardenburg; 1560: Partitioned into itself and Leiningen-Dagsburg-Falkenburg; 1779: HRE Prince; 1796: To France; 1803: Compensated with Amorbach and other territories; renamed to Leiningen
Leiningen-Guntersblum	County	Upp Rhen	WT	1658: Partitioned from Leiningen-Dagsburg-Falkenburg; 1774: Partitioned into itself and Leiningen-Heidesheim; 1795: To France; 1803: Compensated with Billigheim; renamed to Leiningen-Billigheim
Leiningen-Hardenburg (Leiningen-Hartenburg)	County	n/a	n/a	1317: Partitioned from Leiningen-Dagsburg; 1343: Partitioned into Leiningen-Rixingen and itself 1467: Acquired Dagsburg; renamed to Leiningen-Dagsburg-Hardenburg
Leiningen-Heidesheim	County	Upp Rhen	WT	1658: Partitioned from Leiningen-Dagsburg-Falkenburg; 1766: Extinct; to Leiningen-Guntersblum; 1774: Partitioned from Leiningen-Guntersblum; 1795: To France; 1803: Compensated with Neudenau; renamed to Leiningen-Neudenau
Leiningen-Landeck	County	n/a	n/a	1237: Partitioned from Leiningen; 1289: Extinct; Madenburg to Leiningen-Dagsburg, Landeck to Ochsenstein, rest to Zweibrücken
Leiningen-Neudenau; Count of Leiningen, Lord of Herzbolzheim, Count of Dagsburg & Aspremont	County	Upp Rhen	WT	1803: Renamed from Leiningen-Heidesheim; 1806: To Baden
Leiningen-Rixingen	County	Upp Rhen	WE	1343: Partitioned from Leiningen-Hardenburg; 1506: Extinct; Rixingen to Zweibrücken-Bitsch; rest divided between Daun and Hohenfels
Leiningen-Westerburg	Lordship; 1481: County	Upp Rhen	WT	1467: Renamed from Runkel-Westerburg after inheriting much of Leiningen-Dagsburg; 1481: HRE Count; 1547: Partitioned into Leiningen-Westerburg-Leiningen, Leiningen-Westerburg-Westerburg and Leiningen-Westerburg-Schaumburg
Leiningen-Westerburg-Altleiningen; Count of Leiningen, Lord of Westerburg, Grünstadt, Oberbrunn & Forbach	County	Upp Rhen	WT	1698: Partitioned from Leiningen-Westerburg-Schaumburg; 1705: Inherited half of Leiningen-Westerburg-Rixingen; 1795: To France; 1803: Compensated with Ilbenstadt; 1806: To Berg and Hesse-Darmstadt
Leiningen-Westerburg-Leiningen	County	Upp Rhen	WT	1547: Partitioned from Leiningen-Westerburg; 1570: Acquired Rixingen and Oberbronn; 1622: Partitioned into itself, Leiningen-Westerburg-Rixingen and Leiningen-Westerburg-Oberbronn; 1635: Extinct; divided between Leiningen-Westerburg-Rixingen and Leiningen-Westerburg-Oberbronn
Leiningen-Westerburg-Neuleiningen; Count of Leiningen, Lord of Westerburg, Grünstadt, Oberbrunn & Forbach	County	Upp Rhen	WT	1698: Partitioned from Leiningen-Westerburg-Schaumburg; 1705: Inherited half of Leiningen-Westerburg-Rixingen; 1795: To France; 1803: Compensated with Engelthal; 1806: To Nassau
Leiningen-Westerburg-Oberbronn	County	Upp Rhen	WT	1622: Partitioned from Leiningen-Westerburg-Leiningen; 1665: Extinct in male line; divided between Sinclair and Hesse-Homburg
Leiningen-Westerburg-Rixingen	County	Upp Rhen	WT	1622: Partitioned from Leiningen-Westerburg-Leiningen; 1705: Extinct; divided between Leiningen-Westerburg-Altleiningen and Leiningen-Westerburg-Neuleiningen
Leiningen-Westerburg-Schaumburg	County	Upp Rhen	WT	1547: Partitioned from Leiningen-Westerburg; 1656: Sold to Holzappel; 1698: Partitioned into Leiningen-Westerburg-Altleiningen and Leiningen-Westerburg-Neuleiningen
Leiningen-Westerburg-Westerburg	County	Upp Rhen	WT	1547: Partitioned from Leiningen-Westerburg; 1597: Extinct; to Leiningen-Westerburg-Leiningen
Lemgo	Imperial City	Low Rhen	RH	Annexed to Lippe
Leuchtenberg	Landgraviate	Bav	PR	1196: Formed; Lordship c. 1160: County; 1119: Acquired Waldeck; also known as Lord of Waldeck c. 1160: HRE Count; 1196: Landgrave; 1209: Partitioned into Waldeck and itself 1259: Acquired Waldeck; 1366: Partitioned into Leuchtenberg-Leuchtenberg and Leuchtenberg-Grafenau; 1488: Princely Landgraviate; 1488: Renamed from Leuchtenberg-Leuchtenberg; 1646: Extinct; to Bavaria-Leuchtenberg; 1705: To Bavaria; 1707: To the Bishopric of Bamberg; 1708: To Lamberg; 1712: To Austria; 1714: To Bavaria
Leuchtenberg-Grafenau	Landgraviate	n/a	n/a	1366: Partitioned from Leuchtenberg; 1423: Territory to Lower Bavaria; 1456: Extinct
Leuchtenberg-Hals	Princely Landgraviate	n/a	n/a	1463: Partitioned from Leuchtenberg-Leuchtenberg; 1486: To Aichberg; 1488: Extinct
Leuchtenberg-Leuchtenberg	Landgraviate; 1440: Princely Landgraviate	n/a	n/a	1366: Partitioned from Leuchtenberg; 1375: In succession dispute with Ortenburg over Hals; 1378: Acquired Crailsheim; 1399: Sold Crailsheim to Nuremberg; 1400: Acquired Weiden and Parkstein; 1407: Acquired Hals; 1413: Sold Stierenberg to Palatinate-Neuburg; 1440: HRE Princely Landgrave; 1463: Partitioned into itself and Leuchtenberg-Hals; 1488: Renamed to Leuchtenberg
Leutkirch im Allgäu	Imperial City	Swab	SW	1293: Free Imperial City; 1803: To Bavaria; 1810: To Württemberg
Leyen (Gondorf; Petra)	Lordship	n/a	n/a	13th Century: Formed; 1272: First mentioned as ministerialis of the Archbishopric of Trier; 1320: Acquired Weinberg as fief of Katzenelnbogen c. 1395: Partitioned into Leyen-Neustadt and Leyen-Gondorf
Leyen; HRE Prince of and at Leyen & Hohengeroldseck, Baron of Adendorf, Lord of Bliescastel, Burrweiler, Münchweiler, Orterbach, Niewern, Saffig, Ahrenfels, Bongard, Simpelfeld, etc.	Principality	Swab	SC	1806: Renamed from Leyen-Hohengeroldseck; 1815: To Austria; 1819: To Baden
Leyen-Adendorf	Lordship; 1653: Barony	Swab	SC	1539: Partitioned from Leyen-Saffig; 1629: Acquired Nievern; 1653: HRE Baron; 1660: Acquired Blieskastel; 1667: Acquired Forbach; 1670: Acquired Arenfels and Hönningen; 1697: Acquired Hohengeroldseck; 1705: Renamed to Leyen-Hohengeroldseck
Leyen-Gondorf	Lordship	n/a	n/a	c. 1395: Partitioned from Leyen c. 1420: Partitioned into Leyen-Hartelstein and Leyen-Saffig; 1611: Partitioned from Leyen-Saffig; 1692: Extinct; to Leyen-Nickenich
Leyen-Hartelstein	Lordship	n/a	n/a	c. 1420: Partitioned from Leyen-Gondorf; 1479: Extinct; to Leyen-Saffig
Leyen-Hohengeroldseck	Barony; 1711: County	Swab	SC	1705: Renamed from Leyen-Adendorf; 1711: HRE Count; 1794-6: Lost left-bank territory to France; 1806: Renamed to Leyen
Leyen-Neustadt	Lordship	n/a	n/a	c. 1395: Partitioned from Leyen; 1625: Extinct; to Boos von Waldeck
Leyen-Nickenich	Lordship	n/a	n/a	1611: Partitioned from Leyen-Saffig; 1714: Extinct; to Leyen-Hohengeroldseck
Leyen-Saffig	Lordship	n/a	n/a	c. 1420: Partitioned from Leyen-Gondorf; 1444: Acquired Nickenich as fief of the Archbishopric of Trier; 1481: Acquired Saffig and Olbrück as fief of the Archbishopric of Cologne; 1486: Acquired Blieskastel; 1520: Acquired Adendorf; 1525: Acquired Münchhausen and Schäferei; 1539: Partitioned into itself and Leyen-Adendorf; 1611: Partitioned into Leyen-Nickenich, itself and Leyen-Gondorf; 1703: Extinct; to Leyen-Adendorf
Lichtenberg	Lordship; 1458: County	n/a	n/a	13th Century ? 1206: First mentioned 1249: Advocates of Strasbourg c. 1330: Partitioned into Lichtenberg Elder Line and Lichtenberg Younger Line; 1405: Reunited by Lichtenberg Younger Line; 1458: HRE Count; 1480: Extinct; divided between Hanau-Babenhausen and Zweibrücken-Bitsch; 1570: Zweibrücken half to Hanau-Lichtenberg
Lichtenberg Elder Line	Lordship	n/a	n/a	c. 1330: Partitioned from Lichtenberg; 1390: Extinct; divided between Lichtenberg Intermediate Line and Lichtenberg Younger Line
Lichtenberg Intermediate Line	Lordship	n/a	n/a	c. 1335: Partitioned from Lichtenberg Younger Line; 1405: Extinct; to Lichtenberg Younger Line
Lichtenberg Younger Line	Lordship	n/a	n/a	c. 1330: Partitioned from Lichtenberg c. 1335: Partitioned into Lichtenberg Intermediate Line and itself 1405: Renamed to Lichtenberg
Lichtenthal (Lichtental)	Abbacy	n/a	n/a	1245: Founded and given Lichtental in fief of Baden; 1288: Acquired Geroldsau as fief of Baden; 1803: Secularised to Baden
Liechtenstein; Sovereign Prince of Liechtenstein, Duke of Troppau & Jägerndorf, Count of Rietberg, etc	Principality	Swab	PR	c. 1140: Family first mentioned as lower nobility in Austria; 1699: Acquired Schellenberg; 1712: Acquired immediate Vaduz; 1713: Bench of Secular Princes; 1719: Schellenberg and Vaduz united to form Principality of Liechtenstein
Liège (Lüttich, Luik)	Bishopric; 972: Prince-Bishopric	Low Rhen	EC	340s 972: Acquired Huy; Prince-Bishopric; 1096: Acquired Bouillon; 1366: Acquired Loon; 1568: Acquired Horne; 1795: To France; 1815: To the Netherlands; 1830: To Belgium
Ligne; HRE Prince of Ligne & Amblise/Amblia, Margrave of Roubaix/Roubais & Dormans, Count of Fauquemberghe, Baron of Werchin, Beloeil, Antoing, Cisoing, Villiers, Silly & Herzelles; Sovereign of Fagnolle; Lord of Baudour, Wallincourt,& other lands	Lordship; 12th Century: Barony; 1544: County; 1601: Principality	Low Rhen	WE / PR	1020: First mentioned as fiefs of Hainaut; 12th Century: HRE Baron; 1503: Acquired Fauquembergues as fief of France; 1544: HRE County; 1601: HRE Prince; 1770: Acquired Fagnolle; 1786: Lower Rhine-Westphalian Circle; 1789: Bench of Counts of Westphalia; 1795: To France; 1803: Compensated with Edelstetten; Bench of Princes; 1804: Sold to Esterházy von Galántha
Limburg	1106: Duchy	Burg	n/a	c. 1100: Formed; 1155: Duchy of Limburg independent from Lower Lorraine; 1288: Passed to Brabant; 1483: To the Burgundian Netherlands; 1516: To the Spanish Netherlands; 1648: Dalhem, Falkenberg and Maastricht to the Netherlands; 1713: To the Austrian Netherlands; 1794: To France; 1815: To Prussia; 1918: To Belgium
Limburg an der Lahn	Lordship	n/a	n/a	1221: To Isenburg-Cleeberg; 1258: To Isenburg-Limburg; 1342: Half of Limburg to the Archbishopric of Trier; 1406: Isenburg-Limburg extinct; rest to Trier; 1803: To Nassau
Limburg (Hohenlimburg; Limburg an der Lenn)	1242: County of Isenberg-Limburg	n/a	n/a	c. 1242: Hohenlimburg built and an imperial immediate territory consolidated around it 1225: To Altena-Isenberg; 1253: To Limburg-Isenberg; 1304: To Limburg-Hohenlimburg; 1442: Condominium between Neuenahr-Alpen; 1459: and Limburg-Hohenlimburg-Broich; 1508: Limburg half (condominium) to Daun-Falkenstein; 1542: All to Neuenahr-Alpen; 1592: To Bentheim; 1610: To Bentheim-Limburg; 1626: To Bentheim-Alpen; 1629: To Bentheim-Tecklenburg-Rheda; 1808: To Berg; 1813: To Prussia
Limburg-Hohenlimburg-Broich	County	Low Rhen	WE	1372: Created when Limburg-Hohenlimburg inherited Lordship of Broich; fief of Berg and his sons partitioned:count William I zu Hohenlimburg and count Diederik IV zu Broich; 1422: Acquired Bedburg and Hackenbroich; 1432: Fief of Cleves; 1442: Fief of Berg; 1444: Acquired half of Limburg; 1450: Acquired Bürgel; 1459: Acquired half of Limburg-Hohenlimburg; 1482: Acquired Hardenberg-Neviges; 1508: Extinct; to Daun-Falkenstein
Limburg-Hohenlimburg	County	n/a	n/a	1304: Partitioned from Limburg-Isenberg; 1370: Acquired Vitinghof and Neu-Isenberg; 1372: Acquired Broich; to Limburg-Hohenlimburg; 1442: Condominium between Neuenahr-Alpen and Limburg-Hohenlimburg-Broich after a succession dispute.
Limburg-Styrum	Lordship	Low Rhen	WE	1304: Partitioned from Limburg-Isenberg; 1553: Acquired Bronckhorst; 1615: Acquired Borculo; 1640: Acquired Gemen; 1644: Partitioned into Limburg-Styrum-Bronckhorst-Borculo, Limburg-Styrum-Gemen and Limburg-Styrum-Styrum
Limburg-Styrum-Borculo	Lordship	n/a	n/a	1766: Partitioned from Limburg-Styrum-Bronckhorst-Borculo; Non-immediate line with territories within the Netherlands
Limburg-Styrum-Bronckhorst	Lordship	n/a	n/a	1766: Partitioned from Limburg-Styrum-Bronckhorst-Borculo; Non-immediate line with territories within the Netherlands
Limburg-Styrum-Bronckhorst-Borculo	Lordship	n/a	n/a	1644: Partitioned from Limburg-Styrum; 1721: Bronckhorst sold 1726: Borculo sold 1766: Partitioned into Limburg-Styrum-Bronckhorst and Limburg-Styrum-Borculo
Limburg-Styrum-Gemen	Lordship	Low Rhen	WE	1644: Partitioned from Limburg-Styrum; 1677: Side line Limburg-Styrum-Illereichen created 1782: Extinct; to Limburg-Styrum-Illereichen
Limburg-Styrum-Illereichen	Lordship	Low Rhen	WE	1677: Formed when Maximilian Wilhelm of Limburg-Styrum-Gemen acquired Illereichen by marriage 1772: Sold Illereichen to Palm; 1782: Acquired Gemen; 1800: Extinct; To Boyneburg-Bömelberg
Limburg-Styrum-Styrum; Count of Limburg and Bronckhorst, Lord of Styrum, Wisch, Borkelo and Gemen, Hereditary Banner-Lord of the Principality of Gelderland and the County of Zütphen	Lordship	Low Rhen	WE	1644: Partitioned from Limburg-Styrum; 1773: Acquired two thirds of Oberstein; 1806: To Berg
Limpurg (Schenk von Limpurg)	Lordship	n/a	n/a	1138: Mentioned as milisterialis in the service of King Conrad III; 1230: Acquired Bielriet; 1235: Lost their core territories along the Main and Tauber rivers 1251: Acquired Lohrbach c. 1277: Partitioned into itself and Lohrbach; 1356: HRE Hereditary Arch-Cupbearer of the Imperial Household; 1413: Acquired half of Hohenlohe-Speckfeld; 1441: Partitioned into Limpurg-Gaildorf and Limpurg-Limpurg
Limpurg-Gaildorf	Lordship	Franc	FR	1441: Partitioned from Limpurg; 1557: Partitioned into itself and Limpurg-Schmiedelfeld; 1690: Extinct in male line; 2 heiresses 1707: Divided; half to Limpurg-Obersontheim and half to the 2 heiresses. Over the next 99 years Limpurg-Gaildorf was inherited and divided between numerous owners 1806: All to Württemberg
Limpurg-Limpurg	Lordship	Franc	FR	1441: Partitioned from Limpurg; 1475: Partitioned into Limpurg-Speckfeld and itself 1530: Partitioned into Limpurg-Speckfeld and itself 1541: Limpurg sold to Schwäbisch-Hall; renamed to Limpurg-Obersontheim
Limpurg-Obersontheim (Limpurg-Sontheim)	Lordship	Franc	FR	1541: Renamed from Limpurg-Limpurg; 1596: Partitioned into Limpurg-Speckfeld and itself 1713: Extinct in the male line; 5 heiresses. Over the next 95 years Limpurg-Obersontheim was inherited and divided between numerous owners 1806: All to Württemberg
Limpurg-Schmiedelfeld	Lordship	Franc	FR	1557: Partitioned from Limpurg-Gaildorf; 1682: Extinct; to Limpurg-Gaildorf
Limpurg-Speckfeld	Lordship	Franc	FR	1475: Partitioned from Limpurg-Limpurg; 1521: Extinct; to Limpurg-Limpurg; 1530: Partitioned from Limpurg-Limpurg; 1581: Extinct; to Limpurg-Obersontheim; 1596: Partitioned from Limpurg-Obersontheim; 1705: Extinct in the male line; 3 heiresses. Over the next 101 years Limpurg-Speckfeld was inherited and divided between numerous owners 1806: All to Württemberg
Lindau	Abbacy	Swab	EC	c. 822: Formed; 1466: HRE Princess; 1803: To Bretzenheim; 1804: To Austria; 1805: To Bavaria
Lindau	1275: Imperial City	Swab	SW	1275: Imperial Free City; 1803: To Bretzenheim; 1804: To Austria; 1805: To Bavaria
Lindow-Ruppin	County	Upp Sax	WE	c. 1214: Line established when Gebhard of Arnstein acquired Ruppin; 1349: Acquired Wusterhausen and Gransee; 1407: Acquired Neustadt; 1524: Extinct; to Brandenburg
Lingen	County	Low Rhen	WE	13th Century: Part of Tecklenburg; 1493: To Tecklenburg-Lingen; 1526: Fief of Guelders; 1541: To Tecklenburg in fief to Guelders; 1547: To Buren; 1551: To Mary of Hungary; 1555: To the Spanish Netherlands; 1597: To Maurice of Orange; 1605: To the Spanish Netherlands; 1632: To Nassau-Orange; 1702: To Prussia; 1807: To France; 1809: To Berg; 1810: To France; 1814: To Prussia; 1815: To Hanover
Lippe	Lordship; 1528: County	Low Rhen	WE	1123: First mentioned 1190: Acquired Rheda; 1323: Acquired Langenholzhausen and Varenholz; 1344: Partitioned into Lippe-Lippe and Lippe-Rheda; 1365: Reunited by Lippe-Lippe; acquired half of Schwalenberg; 1400: Acquired Barntrup und Salzuflen; 1401: Rheda and Lipperode to Tecklenburg; 1405: Acquired Sternberg; 1444: Lippstadt in condiminium with Mark; 1528: HRE Count; 1568: Simon of Lippe founded sideline of Lippe-Spiegelberg-Pyrmont; 1621: Partitioned into Lippe-Detmold and appanages Lippe-Brake and Lippe-Alverdissen
Lippe-Alverdissen	County	n/a	n/a	1621: Appanage created within Lippe-Detmold; 1640: Acquired half of Schaumburg; 1647: Renamed to Schaumburg-Lippe
Lippe-Biesterfeld	County	n/a	n/a	1768: Appanage created within Lippe-Detmold; 1781: Appanage Lippe-Falkenflucht created
Lippe-Brake	County	n/a	n/a	1621: Appanage created within Lippe-Detmold; 1709: Extinct; to Lippe-Detmold
Lippe-Detmold; HRE Prince, Count & Noble Lord of Lippe, Count of Schwalenberg & Sternberg, Hereditary Burgrave of Utrecht	County; 1789: Principality	Low Rhen	WE / PR	1621: Partitioned from Lippe; 1762: Appanages Lippe-Biesterfeld and Lippe-Weissenfeld created 1789: HRE Prince
Lippe-Falkenflucht	County	n/a	n/a	1781: Appanage created within Lippe-Detmold from Lippe-Biesterfeld
Lippe-Lippe	Lordship	n/a	n/a	1344: Partitioned from Lippe; 1365: Renamed to Lippe
Lippe-Rheda	Lordship	n/a	n/a	1344: Partitioned from Lippe; 1365: Extinct; to Lippe-Lippe in succession dispute with Tecklenburg; 1401: To Tecklenburg
Lippe-Spiegelberg-Pyrmont	County	Low Rhen	WE	1568: Simon of Lippe acquired Spigelberg and Pyrmont through marriage 1583: Extinct; to Gleichen-Tonna
Lippe-Weissenfeld	County	n/a	n/a	1768: Appanage created within Lippe-Detmold
Livonia	Bishopric	n/a	n/a	1186: Established at Üxküll; 1202: Renamed to the Bishopric of Riga
Livonian Order	Order of Chivalry	n/a	n/a	1237: Created from the Swordbrothers Order remnants, within the Teutonic Order; 1346: Acquired Estonia; 1435: Joined the Livonian Confederation; 1561: Order abolished; Courland and Semigallia created; Estonia to Denmark and the rest to Lithuania
Lobkowitz; Prince Lobkowitz, Duke of Roudnice, Princely Counts of Sternstein, etc.	Principality	Bav	PR	1417: Nicholas of Újezd received Lobkovice in Bohemia; took the name Lobkowicz; 1459: HRE Baron; 1562: Acquired Neustadt and Sternstein; 1624: HRE Prince; 1653: Bench of Secular Princes; 1742: Bavarian Circle; 1806: To Bavaria
Lohrbach	Lordship	n/a	n/a	1000: First mentioned as a property of the Lauffen family 1219: To Dürn; 1251: To Limpurg c. 1277: Partitioned from Limpurg; 1291: To the Order of St. John; 13??: Sold to Limpurg; 1413: Sold to Palatinate-Mosbach; 1499: To the Palatinate; 1803: To Leiningen-Billigheim; 1806: To Baden
Lommersum see: Kerpen				
Loon (Looz)	County	Upp Rhen	n/a	944: Formed; 1015: First definitive mention of Loon; 1108: Acquired Rieneck c. 1194: Acquired Duras; 1227: Acquired Chiny; 1336: Extinct; to Heinsberg; 1366: To the Prince-Bishopric of Liège; Rieneck to the Archbishopric of Mainz
Looz-Corswarem; Duke and HRE Princely Count of Looz, Hesbaye, Horne, Niel, Duke of Corswarem-Looz, Count of Fresing and Nieurlet, Upper-Court-Lord of the City and the Castellany of Cassel, Margrave of Ligny, Tongrinne and Pont-d'Oie, Baron of Longchamps and Cranewyck, Vice-Count of St. Gertrude at Liernu, Lord of the free City of Wavre, the City of Fleurus and the Lordships of Landelis, Bommeree, Denee, St. Marie, Vitry, Grand-Lez, Betisart, Clermont, Veleine, and other places	County; 1734: Duchy	Low Rhen	PR	12th Century: Emerged as a sideline of Loon in Corswarem, Ghoer, Nandrin and Fresin; 1250: Acquired Niel; 1734: HRE Duchy; 1795: All lands to France; 1803: Compensated with Rheina-Wolbeck; Lower Rhenish-Westphalian Circle and Bench of Princes; 1806: To Berg
Lorraine	1048: Duchy	Upp Rhen	PR	959: Upper Lotharingia (Lorraine) divided from Lotharingia; 1048: Conferred upon Count Gerhard of Alsace; 1473: Inherited by Vaudemont; 1480: Permanently united with Bar; 1552-1559: French occupation 1633-1659: French occupation 1670-1697: French occupation 1702-1714: French occupation 1766: To France
Lorraine-Nomény	Principality (personalist)	n/a	PR	1736: Personalist vote created for Francis of Lorraine; 1803: Reichstag seat revoked
Lorsch	Abbacy	n/a	n/a	764: Formed; 852: Imperial immediacy 1232: To the Archbishopric of Mainz; 1461: To the Palatinate; 1556: Abbey dissolved
Löwenberg (Lwowek Slaski)	Duchy	n/a	n/a	1281: Partitioned from Jauer into Löwenberg and Jauer 1285: Extinct; to Jauer
Löwenstein	1494: County	Swab	SC	c. 1090: Territory acquired by Calw; 1123: Lowenstein founded by Calw; 1255: To Calw-Löwenstein; 1277: Sold to the Bishopric of Würzburg; 1281: To Austria; 1283: To Albert of Schenkenberg who took the title Löwenstein; 1382: Half sold to the Palatinate; 1441: Rest sold to the Palatinate; 1464: Extinct; 1488: To Louis of Scharfeneck; 1494: HRE Count of Löwenstein; 1504: To Württemberg; 1510: Löwenstein restored but as fief of Württemberg; 1552: Partitioned into Löwenstein-Löwenstein and Löwenstein-Scharfeneck
Löwenstein-Löwenstein	County	Swab	SC	1552: Partitioned from Löwenstein; 1574: Inherited 1/3 of Wertheim; renamed to Löwenstein-Wertheim
Löwenstein-Scharfeneck	County	Swab	SC	1552: Partitioned from Löwenstein; 1622: Under imperial ban; seized by the Emperor; 1633: Extinct; 1634: To Löwenstein-Wertheim-Rochefort; 1794: To France; 1815: To Bavaria
Löwenstein-Wertheim	County	Franc	FR	1574: Renamed from Löwenstein-Löwenstein; 1611: Partitioned into Löwenstein-Wertheim-Virneburg and Löwenstein-Wertheim-Rochefort
Löwenstein-Wertheim-Freudenberg; HRE Prince of Löwenstein and Wertheim, Count of Rochefort, Montaigu, Supreme Prince of Chassepierre/Chaisepierre, Lord of Scharfeneck, Breuberg, Herbeumont/Herbimont, Neufchâteau, Kerpen and Kasselburg	County; 1711: Principality	Low Rhen	PR	1803: Renamed from Löwenstein-Wertheim-Virneburg; 1803: Bench of Princes; 1806: To Baden and the Archbishopric of Regensburg (Wertheim), Württemberg (Limpurg) and Bavaria
Löwenstein-Wertheim-Rochefort	County; 1711: Principality	Franc	FR	1611: Partitioned from Löwenstein-Wertheim; 1711: HRE Prince; 1730: Acquired Rosenberg; 1794: Lost left-bank territory to France; 1803: Compensated with Bronnbach and Rothenfels; renamed to Löwenstein-Wertheim-Rosenberg
Löwenstein-Wertheim-Rosenberg; HRE Prince of Löwenstein and Wertheim, Count of Rochefort, Montaigu, Supreme Prince of Chassepierre, Lord of Scharfeneck, Breuberg, Herbeumont, Neufchâteau, Kerpen & Kasselburg	County; 1711: Principality	Franc	PR	1803: Renamed from Löwenstein-Wertheim-Rochefort; 1803: Bench of Princes; 1806: To Hesse-Darmstadt (Breuberg, Heubach & Habizheim), Baden and the Archbishopric of Regensburg (Wertheim), Württemberg (Limpurg) and Bavaria
Löwenstein-Wertheim-Virneburg	County	Low Rhen	WE	1611: Partitioned from Löwenstein-Wertheim; 1794: Lost left-bank territory to France; 1803: Compensated with Freudenberg; renamed to Löwenstein-Wertheim-Freudenberg
Lower Alsace (Nordgau)	Landgraviate	n/a	n/a	1192: Enfeoffed upon Sigebert III of Werd; 1340: Half to Oettingen; 1359: All to the Bishopric of Strasbourg; 1648: To France
Lower Austria (Austria below the Ems)	Archduchy	Aust	n/a	1379: Partitioned from Austria; 1493: Re-annexed to Austria
Lower Bavaria	Duchy	n/a	n/a	1255: Partitioned from Bavaria; 1340: Extinct; to Upper Bavaria; 1349: Partitioned from Bavaria; 1353: Partitioned into Bavaria-Landshut and Bavaria-Straubing
Lower Isenburg	County	El Rhin	WE	Name given to the territories of the House of Isenburg in the original homelands after the acquisition of Büdingen in 1340: Formed; 1439: Only Isenburg-Isenburg line remaining in Lower Isenburg, and became known as Lower Isenburg; 1502: To Isenburg-Grenzau; 1664: Isenburg-Grenzau extinct; to the Archbishopric of Trier
Lower Lotharingia (Lower Lorraine)	Duchy	n/a	n/a	977: Emperor Otto II granted Lower Lorraine as a duchy to Charles, brother of Lothair of France, as a German fief 1033: United with Upper Lorraine when Gozelo I succeeded 1106: Superseded by Counts of Leuven (later Dukes of Brabant)
Lower Salm; See: Salm in the Ardennes	County			
Lübeck	Bishopric	Low Sax	EC	1149: Formed; 1180: Imperial immediacy 1803: Secularised to Oldenburg as Principality of Lübeck below
Lübeck	Imperial City	Low Sax	RH	1226: Free Imperial City; 1810: To France; 1815: Sovereign Free City
Lübeck	Principality	Low Sax		1803: Bishopric of Lübeck secularised for Oldenburg; 1810: To France; 1814: To Oldenburg
Lucerne	Imperial City	Swab	SW	1415: Free Imperial City; 1178: To Murbach Abbey; 1291: To Austria; 1332: Joined the Swiss Confederation; 1415: Free Imperial City; 1648: Left the Empire
Lüneburg	Duchy	n/a	n/a	1269: Partitioned from Brunswick and Lüneburg; 1369: Extinct; War of the Lüneburg Succession between Brunswick-Wolfenbüttel and Saxony; 1373: To Saxony; 1385: To Henry and Bernard I of Brunswick-Wolfenbüttel; 1388: Saxony renounced claims to Lüneburg; henceforth known as Brunswick-Lüneburg
Lustenau	Imperial Farm	n/a	n/a	1395: Ceded to Hohenems from Werdenberg; 1759: To Austria; 1790: To Harrach-Hohenems / Waldburg-Zeil-Hohenems; 1806: To Bavaria; 1811: To Waldburg-Zeil-Hohenems; 1814: To Austria; 1817: To Waldburg-Zeil-Hohenems; 1830: To Austria
Luxembourg	1059: County; 1354: Duchy	Burg	n/a	963: To Sigfried of Ardennes c. 1060: Title Count of Luxembourg first used by the Ardennes; 1136: Extinct; to Namur; 1196: To Burgundy; 1197: To Ermesinde, Countess of Luxembourg; 1353: To Bohemia; 1354: HRE Duke; 1364: Acquired Chiny; 1443: To Burgundy; 1483: To the Burgundian Netherlands; 1516: To the Spanish Netherlands; 1713: To the Austrian Netherlands; 1795: To France; 1815: Grand Duchy; in personal union with the Netherlands; 1830: Partitioned between France, Belgium and Luxembourg
