= Bruno of Altena-Isenberg =

- Prince-Bishop
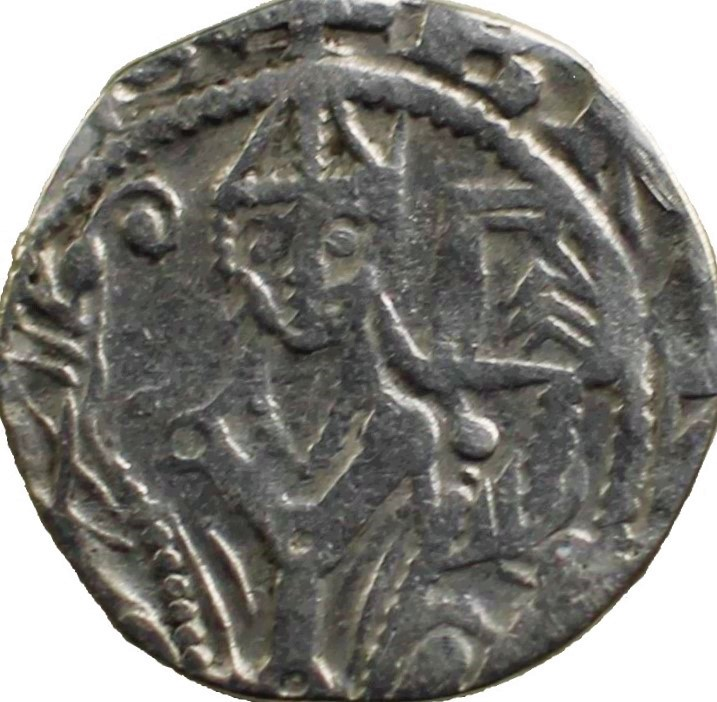
- The Prince-Bishop, minted on a coin

Prince-Bishop of Osnabrück
- Reign: 1250-1258
- Predecessor: Engelbert III of Altena-Isenberg
- Successor: Baldun of Rüssel
- Father: Arnold of Altena
- Mother: Mathilde of Cleves

Bruno of Altena-Isenberg (died 1258), also known as Bruno of Isenberg, was Prince-bishop of Osnabrück from 1250 to his death. He succeeded his brother Engelbert III as Prince-Bishop.

== History ==
The Diocese of Osnabrück, established in 772, was founded by Charlemagne, in order to Christianize the conquered stem-duchy. The Prince-Bishopric of Osnabrück was an ecclesiastical principality of the Holy Roman Empire from 1225 to 1803, with its capital at Osnabrück.

== Biography ==
Bruno was the fourth son of Count Arnold of Altena from his marriage to Mathilde of Cleves, daughter of Dietrich III, Count of Cleves and Adelheid of Sülzbach.

Like his four other brothers, Dietrich III, Bishop of Munster, Engelbert Bishop of Osnabrück (1224–1250), Philipp, priest in Cologne (1264), and Gottfried, priest in Münster (1246), Bruno was destined for an ecclesiastical function. In the chronicle Chronicon Episcopi Münster Bruno is mentioned on 18 July 1226: "Quare ipse episcopus Thiderieus et frater suus Bruno episcopus Osnabrügensis". He was then a deacon in the diocese of Osnabrück, where his brother Engelbert had become bishop two years earlier. In May of that year, the brothers Diederik of Altena-Isenberg and Engelbert of Altena-Isenberg were travelling back from their visit to the Pope in Rome.

During this return journey, Bruno's brother Dietrich died and Engelbert had not yet learned that they had been removed from office. This resulted from an event three quarters of a year earlier, when their older brother Count Frederik of Isenberg was involved in the death of their uncle Engelbert II of Berg, Archbishop of the Electorate of Cologne, on 27 November 1225 in Gevelsberg. In the following years, both Bruno and Engelbert could defend themselves against the accusation of being complicit in the death of their uncle, because they had not been present at the talks with Count Frederik in Soest the night before the death of their uncle Engelbert of Berg. But his brother Diederick was. Still, it is unlikely that he too was aware. As a bishop, he was better able to assess the consequences. In addition, he knew that Archbishop Engelbert was a trained swordsman, who, along with cousin Adolf I von der Mark, had fought (as a cleric) against the Cathars in southern France for forty days in 1212, killing 400 inhabitants of Béziers who did not want to be converted; they were burned at the stake.

After his rehabilitation in 1237, Engelbert of Altena-Isenberg was restored to his former office. In 1250, Bruno succeeded after his brother Engelbert died.

=== Family interest ===
Bruno was also an important advocate for his young cousins, the surviving sons of his brother Frederik, who were raised by their uncle Henry IV, Duke of Limburg, at his stronghold Limburg on the Vesdre. On 17 July 1242, he was a witness, along with his other brothers (except Willem, the youngest), in the transfer of the fief of the castle of Limburg to the Lenne to their uncle Henry IV, Duke of Limburg.

=== Mediator role ===
After 1250, Bruno was frequently mentioned in preserved charters of Bishop Engelbert III of Osnabrück, including in one two years before his death, on 20 and 24 August 1256, when he played a prominent role as a mediator in the conflict between the Cologne Archbishop Coenraad of Hochstaden with the Cathedral Chapter against the Bishop of Paderborn, Simon I of Lippe, with his Dom chapter on disputed land ownership in Salzkotten.

Bruno minted coins in Weidenbrück.

== Literature ==
- MAX PLANCK INSTITUT, Die Bistümmer Der Kirchprovinz Köln. Report: Walter De Gruyter-Berlin-New York. Das Bistum Münster 6. Klaus Scholz 1995. Das Stift Alter Dom St. Paulus zu Münster ISBN 3-11-014533-2.
- Rudolf vom Bruch. Die Rittersitze des Furstentums Osnabrück. Busy. H.Th. Wenner. Der Martinshof Blatt 400.
- Westfälische Zeitschrift 107, 1957 / Internet-Portal "Westfälische Geschichte" URL: http://www.westfaelische-zeitschrift.lwl.org

== Sources ==
- [WestfUB] Die Urkunden des kölnischen Westfalens vom Jahre 1200–1300, Münster 1908 Westfälisches Urkundenbuch 3 und 7.
- [OsnabUB] Philippi, F.: Osnabrücker Urkundenbuch. 4. bdn. M.Bar Osnabruck 1892–1902.
- [Counts of Limburg Hohenlimburg] Van Limburg, H. 2016. Dutch: Graven van Limburg Hohenlimburg & Broich. Printing house: Pro-Book Utrecht 2016. ISBN 978-94-92185-59-4
- [Urkunde 10, Herford] Original A 235 I Stift St. Johann und Dionys, Herford
- [Regest vol. 01. Counts of Limburg] Counts of Limburg Hohenlimburg & Broich. Regesten Part 01 Page 29-64 charters and transcriptions period 1205-1250 ISBN 978-94-92185-60-0
