= Theodoric III =

Theodoric III or Theoderic III may refer to:

- Theuderic III, king of the Franks
- Theodoric the Great, king of the Ostrogoths, third king named Theodoric to rule the Visigothic Kingdom

== See also ==
- Dietrich III (disambiguation)
- Dirk III (disambiguation)
