= Theodoric II (disambiguation) =

Theodoric II was the king of the Visigoths from 453 to 466.

Theodoric II (or Theoderic II, in French Thierry II) may also refer to:

- Theuderic II, Frankish king of Burgundy (595–613) and Austrasia (612–613)
- Theodoric II, Margrave of Lower Lusatia (1032–1034)
- Theodoric II, Duke of Lorraine (1070–1115)
- Theodoric II, Count of Montbéliard (1105–1163)
- Theoderich von Wied, Theodoric II as archbishop of Trier (1212–1242)

== See also ==
- Theodoric, other persons with the name
- Dietrich II (disambiguation), the German form of the name
- Dirk II (disambiguation), the Dutch form of the name
