= Lupfen =

Lupfen is south German or Austrian for "lifting" may refer to:

- Lupfen (mountain), a mountain in Baden-Württemberg, Germany
- County of Lupfen, a feudal state in Baden-Württemberg, Germany
- Lupfen (card game), a card game involving 'lifting' (lupfen) the trump card.
