= Everhardt I of Limburg Hohenlimburg =

German royalty (1252–1304)

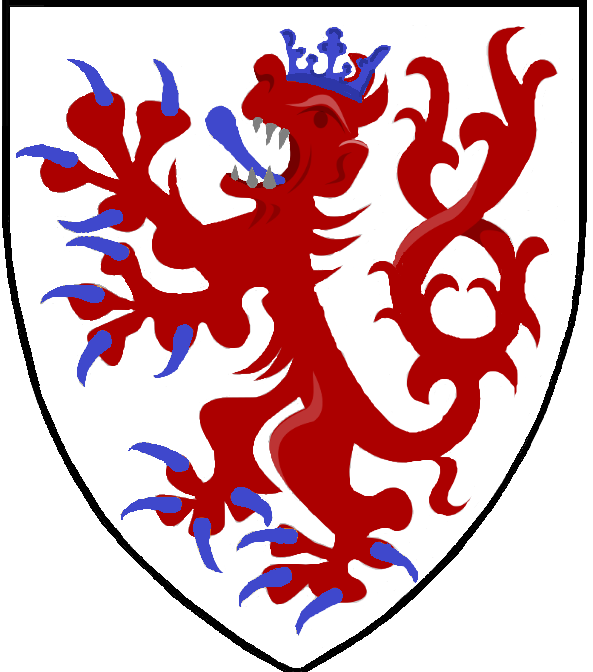
Coat of Arms souverain county of Limburg Lenne

Everhard I, Count of Limburg (zu) Hohenlimburg (c. 1253 – 1308) was the youngest son of Dietrich I of Isenberg and Adelheid of Sayn, daughter of Johan I, and the count of Sayn-Sponheim.

== Biography ==
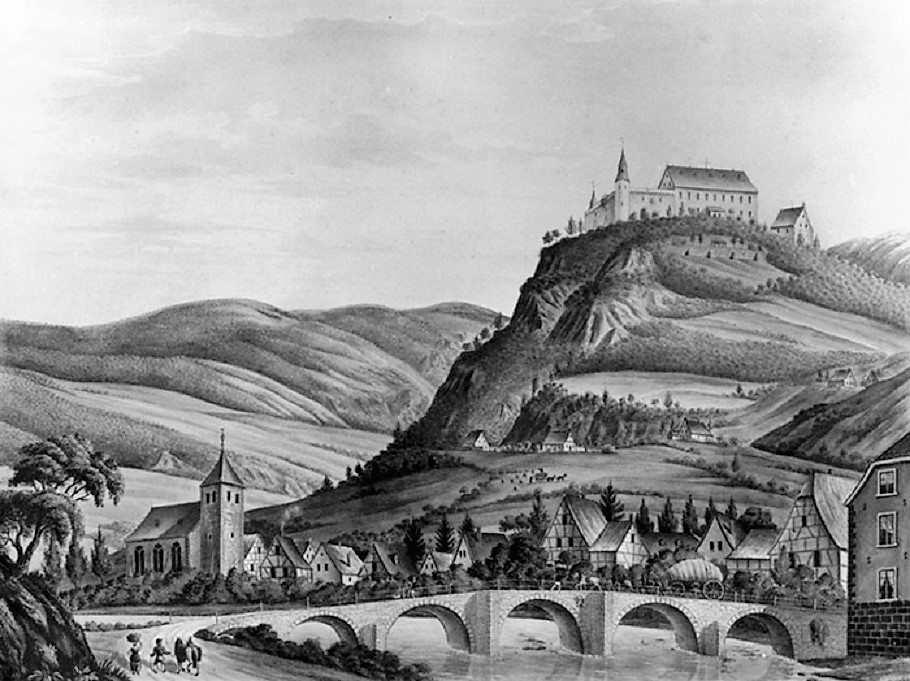
Castle Limburg on the Schleppenberg on the river Lenne

Everhard and his brother Johannes "Johannes, Everhardus nostra filli", was mentioned on March 12, 1271 at the foundation of a Vicario in remembrance of his brother's wife in the chapel of the monastery in Elsey. He was 19 years old at the time and not yet married. A year later he and his mother "Aleydis comitissa in Lymburg, Everhardus fikius noster" witnessed a donation of an estate to the same nunnery of Elsey on River Lenne not far from the castle Hohenlimburg.

Everhard was married to Agnes at around 1274. Her first name appears for the first time in a charter from 1291 that has been preserved. In addition to other indications, in charters from the period between 1272 and 1328, the nobles of Volmarsteyn appear as witness and more than once as blood relative Theodericus de Volmuntstene consanguineus noster and 25 years later Theodericus Volmotsteyne, Herrn Theodericum comitem de Limburgh who calls him their relative and friend. Which brings the possible surname of Agnes ,"of Volmarsteyn", into the picture.

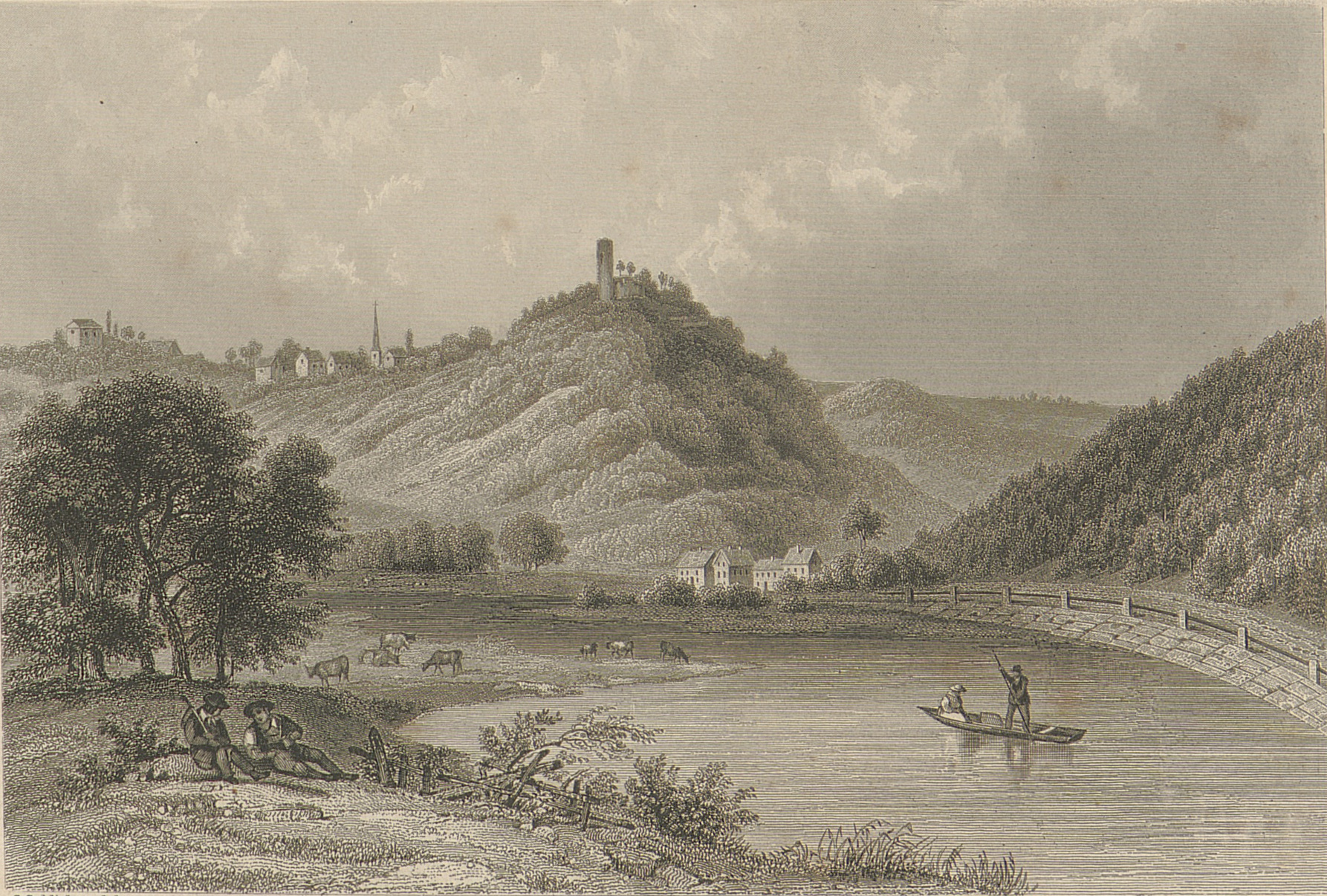
Ruin of Castle Volmarsteyn on the River Ruhr

== Isenberger Fehde ==
The Vicario that his brother Johan founded in 1271 was in memory of his late wife Agnes of the Wildenberg. It is plausible that after only three years of marriage, she died at the birth of their third child, a daughter. That daughter Mechteld would marry in 1286 with Egbert I of Almelo. She is therefore an ancestor of the extinct Dutch nobility family of that name. Everhard, with his father and his five year older brother Johan, competed together to regain lost heritage, until Johan died in 1277, at the age of 30.

After that death, his father Dietrich and Everhard continued that fight together for more than 25 years. Both got into a feud with the Imperial City of Dortmund. In the period 1279-1286. Everhard was involved and called (co-) count in a charter about the exchange of ministerial's with surrounding counts of Arnsberg, of Mark and the Nunnery of Abbey Essen. The battle of Woeringen on June 5, 1288 was a setback. They were not directly involved in the battle, but they did support the faction of Cologne and allies, the losing party. Count Everhard I of Mark, with whom they had been at odds for some time, belonged to the winning party led by the Duke of Brabant. At the time, of Mark had a large fighting group and funds at his disposal and was therefore able to dismantle and largely demolish the newly built second castle of Diederick and Everhard “Neu Isenberg” on the Ruhr opposite Werden. The Hohenlimburg was occupied and the family had to move to their castle Stirum.

== Succession ==
In 1304, he followed in the footsteps of his father as Everhard I, count of Limburg, according to old law of inheritance, "nearest blood inherits land and estate", when he was already 52 years old. He returned to the Hohenlimburg with his wife and children. His cousin Dietrich son of his former uncle Johan, inhered the lordship of Styrum as the first Lord of Limburg Stirum. Everhard's reign did not last long, because he died in 1308. His eldest son Dietrich II succeeded him as Count of Limburg Hohenlimburg.

== Marriage and offspring ==
Everhard I was married around 1274 to Agnes (probably of Volmarsteyn). They had a son Diederik and daughter Irmgard.

- Diederik II, Count of Limburg Hohenlimburg, c. 1276 – 9 August 1364, married on 16 September 1297 to Irmgard of Greiffensteyn, widow of knight Hendrik of Bircklin. Remarried as a widower before 1333 to Elisabeth of Strünckede.
- Irmgard, born around 1278

== Literature ==
- Finger, H. Die Isenberger Fehde und das politische Zusammenwachsen des nördslichen Rhienlands mit Westfahlen in der Stauferzeit. Annalen. Heft 197. Des Historischen Vereins fűr dem Niederrhein. Inbesondere das alte Erzbistum Köln
- Korteweg, K.N. De Nederlandse Leeuw Jaargang LXXXI no.8 August 1964. Corrected lineage of descendants of Dietrich I Graf von Limburg Hohenlimburg.
- Van Limburg, H. 2016. Graven van Limburg Hohenlimburg & Broich. Regesten 01. Printing house: Pro-Book Utrecht. 2016 Edition Bolcom ISBN 978-94-92185-60-0 [HVL R01 RG:date]
- Backman, Clifford R. (2003). The Worlds of Medieval Europe. Oxford, UK: Oxford University Press. ISBN 978-0-19-512169-8.
- Ennen, E.: Frauen im Mittelalter. Verlag C.H. Beck München 1994.
- Bleicher, W. / Van Limburg H, 1998-2004 [German / Dutch] Neue Aspekte der Geschichte der Grafen von Hohen-Limburg und ihrer Nachkommen. In: Hohenlimburger Heimatblätter, Teil 1:59, 3/1998, S.81–93; Teil 2:59, 6/1998, S.201–213; Teil 3:59, 8/1998, S.281–294, 307-311

== Sources ==
- [STA MUNSTER] Von Kindlinger(1919) Westfallischer Urkundenbuch UB III, VII
- [KINDLINGER] Geschichte Volmarstein II Von Kindlinger(1919)
- [KOSTER] Volmestein Nr.332 Nichtstaatliches Schriftgut. Sig.A 436 Haus Dahl
- [MEIER] Dortmunder Universtitaits Bibliothek (1950). Westfälischer Urkundenbuch UB VII.
