= Frederick of Isenberg =

German noble (1193 – 1226)

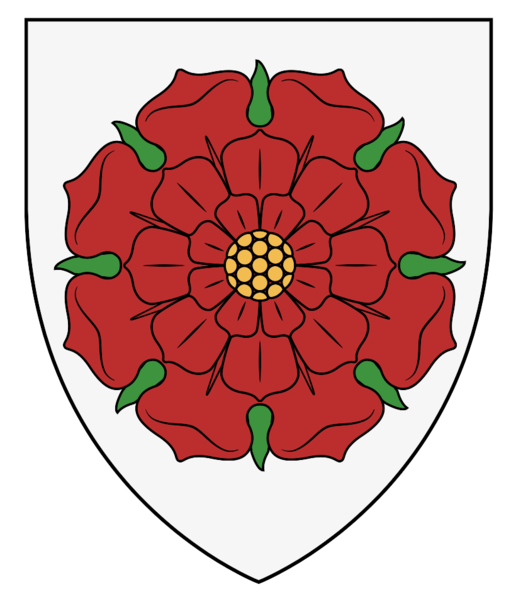
Coat of arms of the county of Altena-Isenberg

Count Frederick of Isenberg (Friedrich von Isenberg) (1193 – 15 November 1226) was a German noble, the younger son of Arnold of Altena (died 1209). Before the split between Arnold of Altena-Isenberg the eldest and his brother Friedrich Altena-Mark the younger son of Everhard von Berg-Altena. His family castle was the Isenberg near Hattingen, Germany.

== Murder ==
According to recent research, Frederick of Isenberg was a leading figure in the opposition of Westphalian nobles to the aggressive power politics of the Archbishop of Cologne, Engelbert of Berg.

In 1225 at the Nobles' Assembly in Soest, Count Frederick met his cousin Count Engelbert von Berg, Archbishop of Cologne, in order to bring about a peaceful agreement concerning the stewardship (Vogtei) of Essen Abbey, which Count Frederick, according to contemporary complaints, was abusing to his own benefit and to the detriment of the abbey. No conclusion was reached.

During their return together from Soest to Cologne, Count Frederick arranged to ambush his cousin, in a defile at the foot of the Gevelsberg between Hagen and Schwelm in the late afternoon of 7 November 1225, in the course of which the archbishop was killed.

There is no consensus as to whether it was a deliberately planned murder, or whether the archbishop was killed in the heat of combat. Current research assumes the latter, and that it was intended to take him into "knightly detention" so that the political demands of the opposing nobility could be pushed through. This was in accordance with the customs of the medieval feuding ethos.

== Aftermath ==
Frederick of Isenberg was outlawed and excommunicated. He was stripped of all offices and stewardships and his entire personal wealth. In the winter of 1225/1226 the new archbishop of Cologne, Heinrich von Müllenark, besieged and destroyed his castle.

Frederick travelled with his brothers Dietrich and Engelbert, bishops of Münster and Osnabrück (both also implicated in the death of the archbishop), and the notary of Isenberg with the necessary documents to the Curia in Rome, in order to have the excommunication lifted.

On the return journey Frederick was taken prisoner at Liège and sold for 2,100 silver marks to the chapter of Cologne Cathedral. On 14 November 1226 he was executed in front of the Severin Gate in Cologne. His arms and legs were smashed and he was broken on the wheel, after which he was displayed on a stone pillar. He did not die until the next day.

His son, Count Dietrich von Altena-Isenberg, later fought to recover his paternal inheritance and founded the house of the Lords of Limburg Styrum and the house of the Counts of Limburg Hohenlimburg and the County of Limburg at Hohenlimburg.

== Marriage and children ==
Frederick married c. 1210 Sophie of Limburg, a daughter of Waleran III, Duke of Limburg and Cunigunde of Lorraine. They had issue:

- Dietrich I (born before 1215, died 1301), last Count of Isenberg and Altena, 1st Count of Limburg (a.d.Lenne)
- Friedrich of Altena (born before 1220, died after 1243)
- Elisabeth of Altena (born before 1220, died after 1275), married ca. 1234 Dietrich II Count of Mors (born 1226, died 1275)
- Sophie of Altena (born before 1222, died after 1292), married in 1237 Heinrich III von Volmestein
- Agnes of Altena (born before 1228, died after 1282), married in 1243 Burchard III von Broich. They had 13 children
- a daughter, married John I, Count of Sponheim-Starkenburg.

== Literature ==
- Kraus, T.R., Die Entstehung der Landesherrschaft der Grafen von Berg bis zum Jahre 1225, Neustadt an der Aisch 1981
- Andernach, N., Entwicklung der Grafschaft Berg, in: Land im Mittelpunkt der Mächte. Die Herzogtümer Jülich-Kleve-Berg, Kleve 1984, S.63-73.
- Hoederath, H.T. Der Fall des Hauses Isenberg 1225/1226 . In rechtsgeschichterlicher und soziologischer Schau, 1954 Zeitschrift der Savigny stiftung fur Rechtsgeschichte. Kanonistische Abteilung
- Aders, G. Die Grafen (von Limburg) und die Herrn von Limburg-Styrum aus dem Haus Berg-Altena-Isenberg. Zeitschift 'Der Marker" 1956 blad 7.
- Korteweg, K.N. Descendants of Dietrich I Graf von Limburg Hohenlimburg. (Corrected lineage). De Nederlandse Leeuw Jaargang LXXXI no.8 August 1964.
- Berg, A. Lineage counts of Limburg Hohenlimburg and Lords of Limburg-Styrum. (Same independent conclusion) Archive fur Sippenforschung Heft 14. Jahrgang 30. Mai 1964.
- Klueting, H: "'Daß sie ein Abspliß von der Grafschaft Mark ist, daran ist kein Zweifel'": Die Grafschaft Limburg vom 13. bis zum 19 Jahrhundert", in: Jahrburch des Vereins für Orts-und Heimatkunde in der Grafschaft Mark 93/93 (1995), pp 63–126.
- Marra, S: "Grafen von der Mark, Herzöge von Kleve-Mark" und "Jülich-Kleve (Hof)", in: Werner Paravicini, editor: Fürstliche Höfe und Residenzen im spätmittelalterlichen Reich, (Sigmaringen 2003)
- Eversberg, H. Graf Friederich von Isenberg und die Isenburg 1193-1226. Hattingen 1989
- Gerhard E. Sollbach: "Der gewaltsame Tod des Erzbischofs Engelbert I. von Köln am 7. November 1225. Ein mittelalterlicher Kriminalfall", in: Jahrbuch des Vereins für Ort- und Heimatkunde in der Grafschaft Mark, 93./94. Bd., 1995, pp 7–49.
- Bleicher, W. Hohenlimburgher Heimatblätter fűr den Raum Hagen und Isenlohn. Beiträge zur Landeskunde. Monatsschrift des Vereins fűr Orts- und Heimatkunde Hohenlimburg e.V. Drűck Geldsetzer und Schäfer Gmbh. Iserlohn. County of Limburg Lenne. 1976-2012
