= Arnold of Altena =

German nobleman

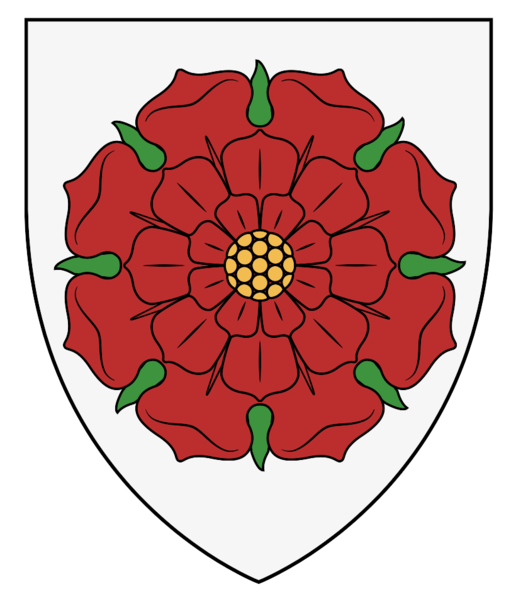
Coat of arms Arnold I count of Altena-Isenberg

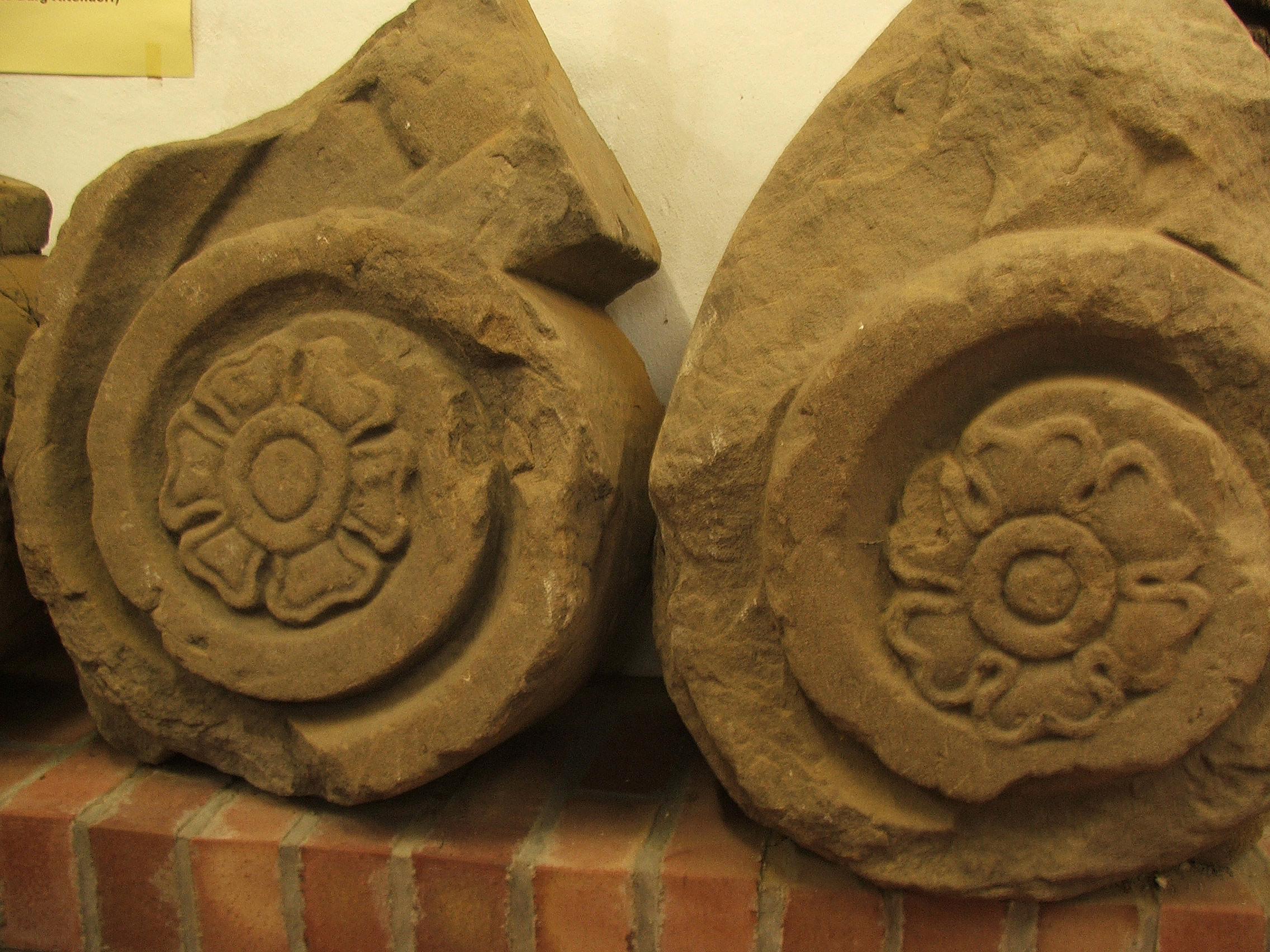
The Isenberger Rose was the coat of arms of Friedrich von Isenberg. It had been adopted by his father, Arnold of Altena.

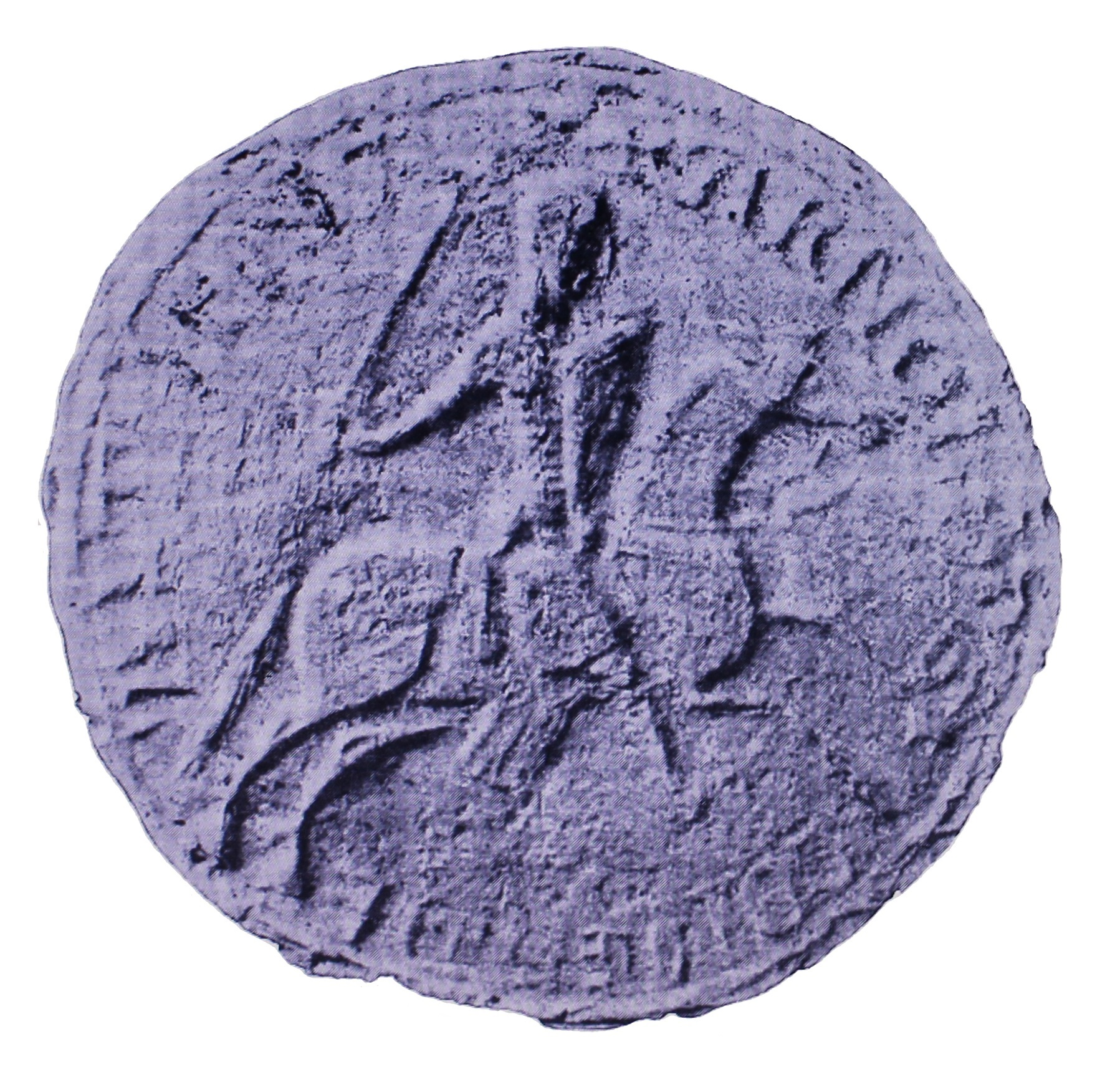
Waxseal of count Arnold I of Altena-Isenberg

Arnold of Altena, count of Altena, count of Isenberg and Hövel, Vogt of Werden (1166–1209) was a son of Eberhard IV of Berg. He inherited the north-western territorium of Altena, and became 1st count of Isenberg in 1200.He married Mathilde countess of Cleve daughter of Dietrich III, Count of Cleves and Adelaide of Sulzbach (+12.2.1189). Mathilde's brother was count Diederick IV of Cleve (+1193) who married in 1182 Mechteld (Margaret) of Holland (died after 1203). Sister countess Aleid of Cleve who married count Dietrich VII of Holland. in 1186 in "villa losdun, in fundo meo proprio" Loosduinen.

Valuable information regarding the family history of the Counts of Holland in Annales Egmundenses, also known as Annales Egmundani: annals from the monastery covering the years 875–1205. They serve as a continuation of the *Annales qui dicuntur Xantenses* and include later additions spanning 1207 to 1315. Incipit: "Anno 875 Lodowicus imperator qui Italiae regnum regebat moritur

Family ties (existing prior to 1247) between the Counts of Holland and the houses of Cleves, Guelders, and Berg-Altena played a role in the election of Count William II of Holland (1234–1256) as German King that year. The support of the Archbishop of Cologne proved to be of decisive importance.

Count Arnold of Altena – Isenberg and Mathilde countess of Cleve had issue:

- Eberhard II count of Altena and Isenberg (born 1180, died 1209)
- Friedrich II of Isenberg, count of Altena and Limburg-Isenberg (beheaded at Cologne 13 November 1226);
- Dietrich of Altena, (born before 1180, died on the way back from Rome to Limburg 18 July 1226);
- Engelbert of Altena, (1224-deposed 1226 following his implication in Engelbert II of Berg's assassination, rehabilitated 1238-1250) (born before 1200, died 1250);
- Philipp of Altena, Propst zu Soest and Domthesaurar in Cologne (born before 1200, died 1264);
- Bruno of Altena, (1250–1258) (born before 1200, died 20 December 1258);
- Gottfried of Altena, Propst zu St. Martin and Domdechant in Münster (born before 1220, died after 1247);
- Adolf von Holte (born 1220, died before 25 January 1260), married to Elisabeth von Holte (died after 1260). They had issue:
  - Heinrich von Holte, a prior in Cologne (fl. 1261/89);
  - Arnold von Holte, a priest (fl. 1266);
  - Wilhelm von Holte, a priest (fl. 1281);
  - Mechtild von Holte, heiress of Holte and Morenhoven (died 1301), married to Gerhard von Arberg, Bggf von Köln (died 1287);
  - Heilwig (fl. 1237/46), married to Wilhelm I von Horn; and
  - Christina (fl. 1257), married to Albero Schalle;
- Wilhelm of Altena, also called Wilhelm of Isenberg (1223-1242). He had a son, Wilhelm (fl. 1275), married to Christina NN;
- NN, a daughter, married to Hermann of Altena.
- Agnes of Altena, a daughter, married to Christian II, Count of Oldenburg.

== Literature ==
- Stehkamper, H.: Der Kölner Erzbischof Adolf von Altena und die deutsche Köningswahl 1195-1205. HZ Beiheft 2. 1973.
- Oediger, F.W.: Quellen Geschichte des Erzbistums Köln. Band 1. Das Bistum Köln von den Anfängen bis zum Ende des 12. Jahrhunderts, zweite Auflage Köln 1972.
- Janssen, W.: Quellen. Das Erzbistum Köln im späten Mittelalter 1191-1515, Teil 1, Köln 1995 (Geschichte des Erzbistums Köln 2, 1).
- Kraus, T.R.: Die Entstehung der Landesherrschaft der Grafen von Berg bis zum Jahre 1225, Neustadt an der Aisch 1981
- Andernach, N.: Entwicklung der Grafschaft Berg, in: Land im Mittelpunkt der Mächte. Die Herzogtümer Jülich-Kleve-Berg, Kleve 1984, S. 63-73.
- Holdt, U,: Die Entwicklung des Territoriums Berg (Karte und Beiheft V/16 = Geschichtlicher Atlas der Rheinlande, Lieferung 11), Bonn 2008.
- Boer, de D.E.P. and Cordfunke, E.H.P.: Graven van Holland. Publisher Walburg pers. ISBN 978-90-5730-7287,
- Bleicher, W. 1976-2012: County of Limburg Lenne. Historian and Editor: Hohenlimburger Heimatblätter. Monatsschrift des Vereins für Orts- und Heimatkunde Hohenlimburg e.V.Jahrgang 1976 bis zu 2012
- Korteweg, K.N.: Descendants of Dietrich I Graf von Limburg Hohenlimburg. De Nederlandse Leeuw Jaargang LXXXI no.8 August 1964.
- Berg, A.; Lineage counts of Limburg Hohenlimburg and Lords of Limburg-Styrum. Archive fur Sippenforschung Heft 14. Jahrgang 30. Mai 1964.
- Oppermann, O. (1933) Fontes Egmundenses (publication Historisch Genootschap te Utrecht, Derde reeks, 61a), p. 55-57,113.
- Cordfunke, E.H.P. (1987) Gravinnen van Holland en huwelijkspolitiek van de graven uit het Hollandse Huis.
- Limburg Van, H. (2024) Hohenlimburger Heimatblätter Heft 10/2024 „Leserbriefe: Auf Limburger Spuren im Schloss Broich“ p. 356-360. G 20 915 E / ISSN 2698-8402
- Hertog De, W.E. (1997). De Abdij van Loosduinen. Cistercienzerinnenklooster van 1229-1572 p.. 9-125 ISBN 978-90-72766-21-2

== Sources ==
- Kort, J.C. (1981) Het archief van de graven van Holland 899-1581 dl.1. ’s Gravenhage
- Kruisheer, J.G. (1971) De oorkonden en de kanselarij van de graven van Holland tot 1299. HS dl 2.) ’s Gravenhage – Haarlem
- Original hand text. British Library London. Selection Cotton Tiberias C IX, fol. 171vo line 17-19
