= Eberhard I of Berg-Altena =

Count of Altena

Eberhard IV of Berg, count of Altena (also called Eberhard I von Altena) (1140 – 23 January 1180, buried in Altenberg), was a son of Adolf IV, Count of Berg and Altena.

He married Adelheid von Arnsberg (van Cuyck) (died 1200), a daughter of Heinrich I count von Arnsberg (born 1123, died 1185) and Ermengarde (Irmgard) von Freusburg (died 1203).

He inherited the eastern territorium of the County of Berg and became the 1st count of Altena from 1161, and Vogt of Werden and Cappenberg (1166–1180). His territories were later divided between his sons Arnold of Altena (the Isenberg, then Limburg (Lenne) line) and Friedrich I of Altena (the Altena, then Marck line). Before the split between Arnold Altena-Isenberg the eldest and his brother Friedrich Altena-Mark the younger son of Everhard, the ‘Grafschaft Mark’ did not yet exist.

== Children ==
Eberhard IV had at least 4 children:

- Oda (born 1165, died by 1224), married to Simon count von Tecklenburg (k.a. 1202). They had children:
  - Otto II count von Teklenburg and
  - Oda von Tecklenburg;
- Arnold of Altena (born 1166, died 1209), 1st count of Isenberg, followed by the counts of Limburg Hohenlimburg and Broich;
- Adolf of Altena, Archbishop of Cologne from 1193 until 1205, and between 1212 and 1214 (born 1168, died in Neuss on 15 April 1220);
- Friedrich I of Altena (died 1198).
