= Hagen-Hohenlimburg =

Borough of Hagen, Germany

Coordinates: 51°22′N 7°36′E

Hohenlimburg

Hagen-Hohenlimburg (formerly known as Limburg an der Lenne, changed to Hohenlimburg in 1903; Westphalian: Limmerg), on the Lenne river, is a borough of the city of Hagen in North Rhine-Westphalia, Germany.

Hohenlimburg was formerly the chief town of the county of Limburg-Hohenlimburg in medieval Germany, first documented in 1230, and belonged to the counts of Limburg Hohenlimburg and Broich. In the 13th century, Dietrich I of Isenberg recovered a small territory out of the previous possessions of his father Friedrich II of Isenberg, built a castle and took the title of count of Limburg, a family which still lives today in Belgium and the Netherlands.

Later Hohenlimburg passed to the counts of Bentheim-Tecklenburg. As of 1911, the castle of Hohenlimburg, which overlooks the town, was the residence of Prince Adolf of Bentheim-Tecklenburg.

Also as of 1911, the town was involved in iron and metal industries, and dyeing, cloth-making and linenweaving also took place. The population in 1905 was 12,790, and its 2004 population was 27,337.

Hohenlimburg station is on the Ruhr–Sieg railway and is served by two lines, Regional-Express service RE 16 (Ruhr-Lenne-Express) from Essen via Hagen to Iserlohn and Regionalbahn service RB 91 (Ruhr-Sieg-Bahn) from Hagen to Siegen or Iserlohn, both running hourly.

Wilhelm Böing (3 May 1846 – 10 January 1890), who emigrated in 1868 from Hohenlimburg to the US and became a timber merchant in Detroit, was the father of William Boeing, founder of the Boeing company.

Liévin, a town in northern France, was twinned with Hohenlimburg in 1962.
