= Dietrich II =

Dietrich II may refer to:

- Dietrich II, Margrave of Lower Lusatia (c. 989 – 1034)
- Dietrich II, Count of Cleves (ruled 1147–1172)
- Theodoric II of Isenburg-Kempenich (ruled until 1232 or later)
- Dietrich II of Isenberg-Limburg (died c. 1303)
