= Dietrich II of Isenberg-Limburg =

German aristocrat

Dietrich II of Isenberg-Limburg (died 22 March 1328) was a German aristocrat. In deeds and charters known as Dietrich (II) of Limburg-Stirum, he was lord of Stirum and the son of Johann of Isenberg-Limburg, who died in 1277. He should not be confused with Diederik II count of Limburg Hohenlimburg (±1276 - 09.08.1364) or Dietrich III count of Limburg Hohenlimburg and lord of Broich (±1328-18.05.1401), who actually ruled the county Limburg (Lenne).

He married Bertrada von Goetterswick and they had four children:

- Johann of Limburg, gt of Stirum (died before 1364);
- Dietrich IV of Limburg, gt von Stirum;
- Agnes (died after 1342).
- Guda, married to Heinrich Wolf von Ludinghausen.

== Literature ==
- Genealogische Handbuch des Adels, Gräfliche Häuser A Band II, 1955; (outdated)
- W. Gf v. Limburg Stirum, "Stamtafel der Graven van Limburg Stirum", 's Gravenhage 1878; (outdated)
