= Dietrich III =

Dietrich III may refer to:

- Dietrich III, Count of Cleves (r. 1172–1188)
- Theodoric III of Isenburg-Kempenich (fl. 1232)
- Dietrich III of Limburg-Styrum (fl. 1347–1391)
