= Dietrich III of Limburg-Styrum =

Dietrich III of Limburg-Stirum (fl. 1347–1391–8), was the son of Johann of Limburg and Uda von Ravensburg. Dietrich served as the lord. of Limburg Styrum until his death. He married ca. 1353 Johanna von Reifferscheid and after her death married Joan of Kessenich. They had the following children:

- Friedrich (fl. 1378–97)
- Johann (fl. 1379–96)
- Eberhard of Limburg, (died before 1426), married to Ponzetta von Saffenberg;
- Dietrich (fl. 1387);
- Godert, a canon in Cologne (1432);
- Gerhard (fl. 1421);
- Irmiswind, a nun at Thorn (died 1429);
- Margareta, married to Burkhard Stecke zu Muhlenbroich.

== Literature ==
- W. Gf v. Limburg Stirum, "Stamtafel der Graven van Limburg Stirum", 's Gravenhage 1878; (outdated)
- Berg, A. [German] Archive fur Sippenforschung Heft 14. Jahrgang 30. Mai 1964
