= Dietrich III, Bishop of Münster =

Bishop of Münster

Dietrich of Altena-Isenberg (c. 1196 – 18 July 1226), known as Dietrich III Bishop of Münster (1218–1226). He was closely involved in the preparations for the construction of St. Paul's Cathedral in Münster. On 22 July 1225, he laid the foundation stone for the Dom Church, "Neubau iuxta formam templi Marienfeldensis aedificanda".

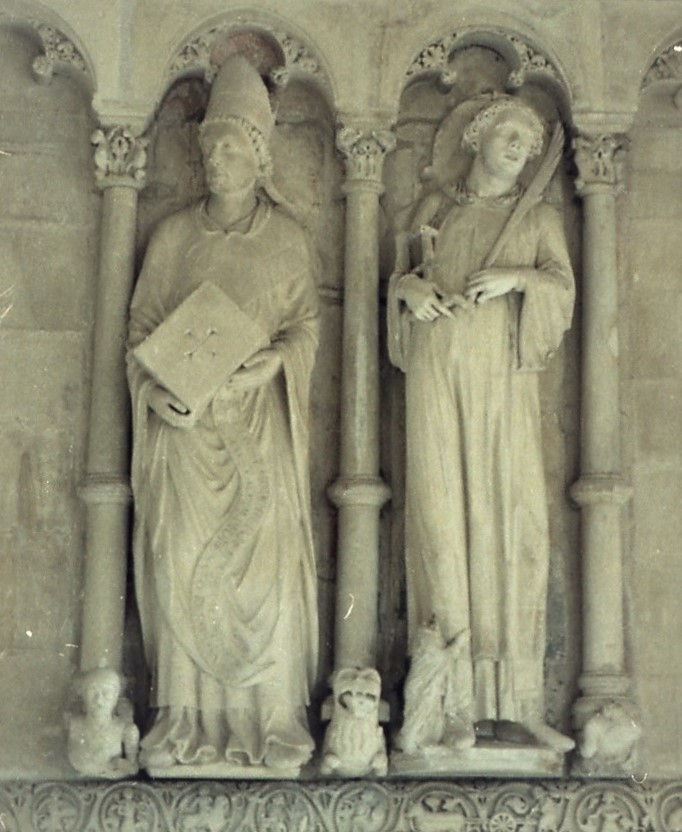
Bishop Dietrich III of Munster 1218 1226. At the entrance to the cathedral of Munster.

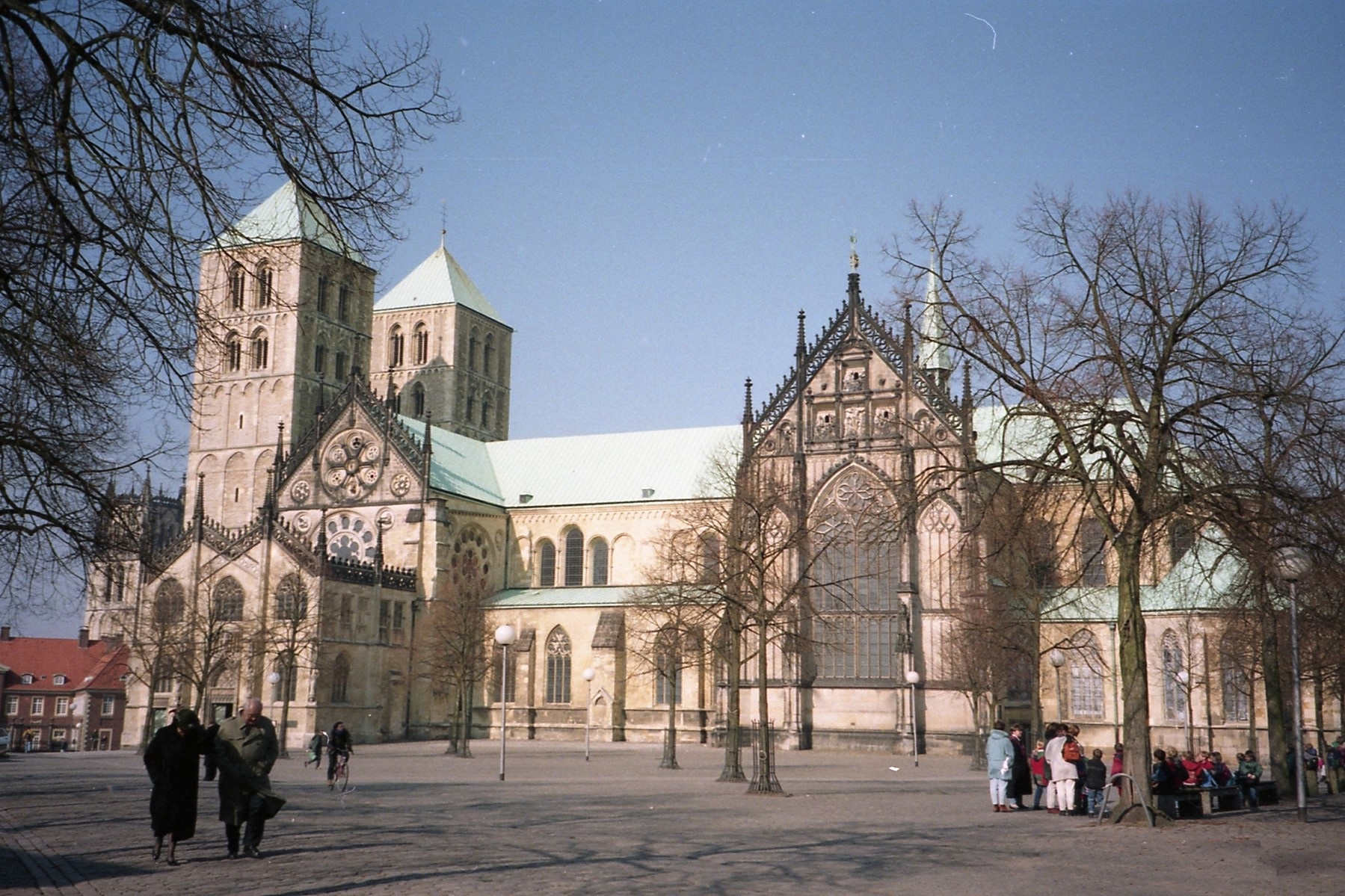
Saint Paul's Cathedral of Münster

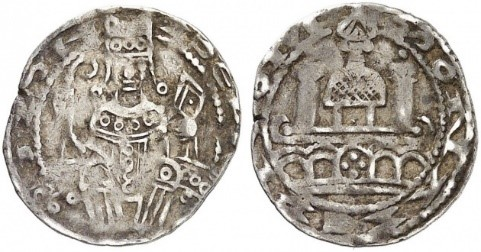
Coins Bishop Dietrich III of Munster 1225

== Early life ==
Dietrich was the son of Count Arnold of Altena from his marriage to Mathilde of Cleve, daughter of Dietrich III, Count of Cleves and Adelheid of Sülzbach. Like his four younger brothers Engelbert, Philip, Bruno and Gottfried, Dietrich was destined for the church. In 1218 he succeeded the Bishop of Münster, Otto I of Oldenburg, after his death during the Fifth Crusade in Syria. In his period as bishop he was known as a mint lord. Dietrich laid the foundation stone for the completion of the new construction of the Saint Paul cathedral in Műnster on 22 July 1225. His role was abruptly cut short and continued by the chapter later that year, when his brother Frederick of Isenberg was involved in the death of their uncle Engelbert II of Berg, Archbishop of Cologne, on 27 November 1226, in Gevelsberg.

== Rome trip ==
Dietrich left on 1 January 1226 accompanied by prelates and three abbots of his diocese, his brother Engelbert, Bishop of Osnabrück and the Bishop of Minden on his way to Liège. A trial was held there on 2 February 1226, in which he and Engelbert had to defend themselves against the charge of complicity. A commotion led to the referral of the matter to the Pope. Dietrich and Engelbert set out for Rome on 23 February 1226. On 30 April 1226, while they were still on their way back, it was already known in Cologne that the Pope had confirmed their dispensation as bishop. Dietrich died on 18 July 1226 while still on the return journey. His successor was Bishop Ludolf of Holte. Dietrich’s brother Engelbert was later rehabilitated and in 1239 again became Bishop of Osnabrück. Their brother Bruno, Bishop of Osnabruck succeeded him in 1250.

== Literature ==
- Die Bistümmer Der Kirchprovinz Köln. Max Planck Institut. Report: Walter De Gruyter-Berlin-New York. Neu Folge 17.1 Wilhelm Kohl 1987. Das Bistum Münster 4.1 ISBN 3-11-011030-X
- Das Domstrift St. Paulus zu Münster. Neu Folge 17.2 Wilhelm Kohl 1982.
- Das Bistum Münster 4.2 ISBN 3-11-008508-9.
- Das Domstrift St. Paulus zu Münster. Neu Folge 17.3 Wilhelm Kohl 1989.
- Das Bistum Münster 4.3 ISBN 3-11-012043-7.
- Das Domstrift St. Paulus zu Münster. Das Bistum Münster 6. Klaus Scholz 1995.
- Das Stift Alter Dom St. Paulus zu Münster ISBN 3-11-014533-2 Tibus Adolph, Das Grab Bischof Dietrichs 111. d.o.b.
- Grafen von Isenbu(e)rg im Dom zu Munster. 1886; Ergänzungen dazu: Vaterländ G 51. 1893 T. 1 S.181-185

== Sources ==
- WestfUB Die Urkunden des kölnischen Westfalens vom Jahre 1200-1300, Münster 1908 Westfällisches urkundenbuch 3 und 7.
- Counts of Limburg Hohenlimburg Of Limburg, H. 2016. Counts of Limburg Hohenlimburg & Broich. Printing house: Pro-Book Utrecht 2016. ISBN 978-94-92185-59-4
- Wisplinghoff, E. (1961) Engelbert I von Berg, Erzbischof von Köln 1182-1225. Rhenish life picture. Band 1. Düsseldorf 1961
- Wevelinkhoven WXXYI THIDERIGUS nobilis, the Ysenborch. Florenz von Wevelinkhoven's Chronik der Bischöfe von Münster mit der Fortsetzung eines Ungenannten und den Zusätzen der Mönche von Marienfeld. 1424
- OsnabUB 4 Osnabrücker Urkundenbuch Bd.4.Philippi, F. M.Bar Osnabrück 1892-1902.
- Westfälische Zeitschrift 107, 1957 / Internet-Portal "Westfälische Geschichte" URL: http://www.westfaelische-zeitschrift.lwl.org
