= Engelbert of Altena-Isenberg =

Bishop of Osnabrück

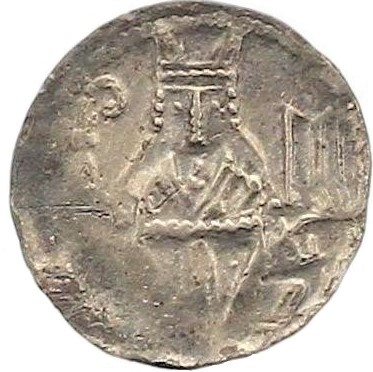
Coin effigy of bishop Engelbert I

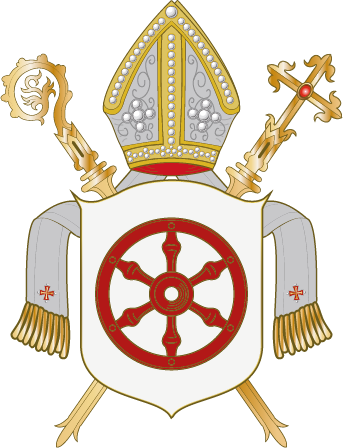
Arms of the newly founded Prince-Bishopric of Osnabrück

Engelbert of Altena-Isenberg (1198 – 1250) was appointed Propst at St. George's Church in Cologne around 1220 and then Dompropst von Osnabrück in 1222. On September 4, 1223 Engelbertus, Osnabrugensis ecclesie maior prepositus he became Engelbert I bishop of the Prince-Bishopric of Osnabrück. and reigned during two periods, the first from 1224 - 1226 and the second from 1237 - 1250.

== History ==
The Diocese of Osnabrück, erected in 772, was founded by Charlemagne, in order to Christianize the conquered stem-duchy. The episcopal and capitular possessions grew in time, and its prince-bishops exercised an extensive civil jurisdiction within the territory covered by their rights of Imperial immunity. The Prince-Bishopric of Osnabrück was an ecclesiastical principality of the Holy Roman Empire from 1225 until 1803. It should not be confused with the Diocese of Osnabrück, which was larger and over which the prince-bishop exercised only the spiritual authority of an ordinary bishop. It was named after its capital, Osnabrück.

== Lifecycle Prince bishop Engelbert ==
Engelbert was the third son of Count Arnold of Altena from his marriage to Mathilde of Cleves, daughter of Dietrich III, Count of Cleves and Adelheid of Sülzbach.

Like four other brothers Dietrich, Philip, Bruno and Gottfried, Engelbert was destined for an ecclesiastical office. In 1224 he succeeded Bishop Adolf of Tecklenburg in the Diocese of Osnabrück. During the first period (1224 - 1226) as bishop. Engelbert obtained sovereignty for Osnabrück, Iburg, Melle, Dissen, Ankum, Bramsche, Damme and Wiedenbrűck on 3 September 1225 from the German king Henry VII (Roman king). That was the beginning of the development of the highly erstwhile Osnabrück, the basis of the sovereign prince-bishopric of Osnabrück. As episcopal mint lord he had coins minted in Wiedenbrűck. His sovereign rule was abruptly cut short almost 3 months later. Brother Count Frederik of Altena-Isenberg was involved on 27 November 1225 in Gevelsberg in the death of their uncle Engelbert II of Berg, Archbishop of the Electorate of Cologne.

== Fine trip to Rome ==
Together with brother Dietrich of Altena-Isenberg, Bishop of Münster, Engelbert left on January 27, 1226, for Liège accompanied by the Bishop of the Prince-Bishopric of Minden, prelates and three abbots. A trial was held here on February 2, 1226, where both brothers, Dietrich and Engelbert, had to defend themselves against the charges of complicity in the death of Engelbert of Berg, Archbishop of Cologne for which their brother Count Frederik of Isenberg was responsible. In Liège, after a tumult, the matter was referred to the Pope. Both bishops, Dietrich and Engelbert, left Liège for Rome on February 23, 1226. On April 30, 1226, while they were still on their way back, it was already known in Cologne that the Pope had ratified the dispensation of both as bishops. Dietrich died on their return journey. Engelbert returned safely in the summer. After the execution of brother Frederik, Engelbert remained the main advocate for his young cousins, the young sons of brother Frederik, who were raised by their uncle Duke Hendrik IV of Limburg at his stronghold on the Vesdre.

== Rehabilitation ==
Engelbert was rehabilitated and in 1239 after the death of Bishop Konrads of Veltberg Bishop of Osnabrück for the second time. During this period, in 1246, he built Reckenberg Castle southeast of Osnabrück. He attached a loan room to it. The military commander for the city and the castle became the drost who led 10 vassals from which a knighthood of vassals arose. Armed hands were to provide that assistance when hostilities threatened. Engelbert also appears that year with his other brothers as witnesses in the charter of 17 July 1242 of the fief transfer of the Limburg castle on the Lenne. A few years before his death, Engelbert acted as adviser to his cousin Dietrich's peace treaty with the Count of Mark. In the foundation charter of May 1, 1243 of the castle of Limburg, he is mentioned as the first drafter and Duke Hendrik of Limburg as the second.

== Literature ==
MAX PLANCK INSTITUT Die Bistümer Der Kirchprovinz Köln. Report: Walter De Gruyter-Berlin-New York. Das Bistum Münster 6. Klaus Scholz 1995. Das Stift Alter Dom St. Paulus zu Münster ISBN 3-11-014533-2.

== Sources ==
- [WestfUB] Die Urkunden des kölnischen Westfalens vom Jahre 1200–1300, Münster 1908 Westfälische Urkundenbuch 3 und 7.
- [OsnabUB] Philippi, F.: Osnabrücker Urkundenbuch. 4. bdn. M.Bar Osnabruck 1892–1902.
- [Counts of Limburg Hohenlimburg] Of Limburg, H. 2016. Counts of Limburg Hohenlimburg & Broich. Printing house: Pro-Book Utrecht 2016. Edition Bolcom (ISBN 978-94-92185-59-4)
- [Grab Bischof Dietrichs III] Tibus Adolph, Das Grab Bischof Dietrichs III. born Grafen von Isenberg im Dom zu Munster. 1886; Vaterländ G 51. 1893 T. 1 S.181-185
- [Lehnregister Bischöfe Műnster] Kemkes, Theuerkauf u.a.:Lehnregister der Bischöfe von Műnster bis 1379. Historischen Kommission fűr Westfalen 28 Westfälische Lehnbücher 2 Műnster 1995.
- [Regest vol. 01. Counts of Limburg] Counts of Limburg Hohenlimburg & Broich. Regesten Part 01 Page 29-64 regests and transcripts period 1205-1250 (ISBN 978-94-92185-60-0)
- [Reckenberg Castle] Blatt 385. Rudolf vom Bruch. Die Rittersitze des Furstentums Osnabrück. Busy. H.Th. Wenner.
- Westfälische Zeitschrift 107, 1957 / Internet-Portal "Westfälische Geschichte" URL: http://www.westfaelische-zeitschrift.lwl.org. Anton Weddige. Ein Burglehn zu Reckenberg Blatt 172.
