= Dirk III =

Dirk III may refer to:

- Dirk III, Count of Holland from 993 to 1039
- Dirk III van Valkenburg (died 1305)
- Dirk III van Wassenaer (c. 1325–1391 or 1392)
- Dirk III van Brederode (ca. 1308–1377)
