= Dirk II =

Dirk II may refer to:

- Dirk II, Count of Holland (920/930 – 988)
- Dirk II van Valkenburg (died 1268)
- Dirk II van Brederode (c. 1256 – 1318)
