= Lupfen (mountain) =

Mountain in Baden-Württemberg, Germany

Coordinates: 48°02′N 8°41′E

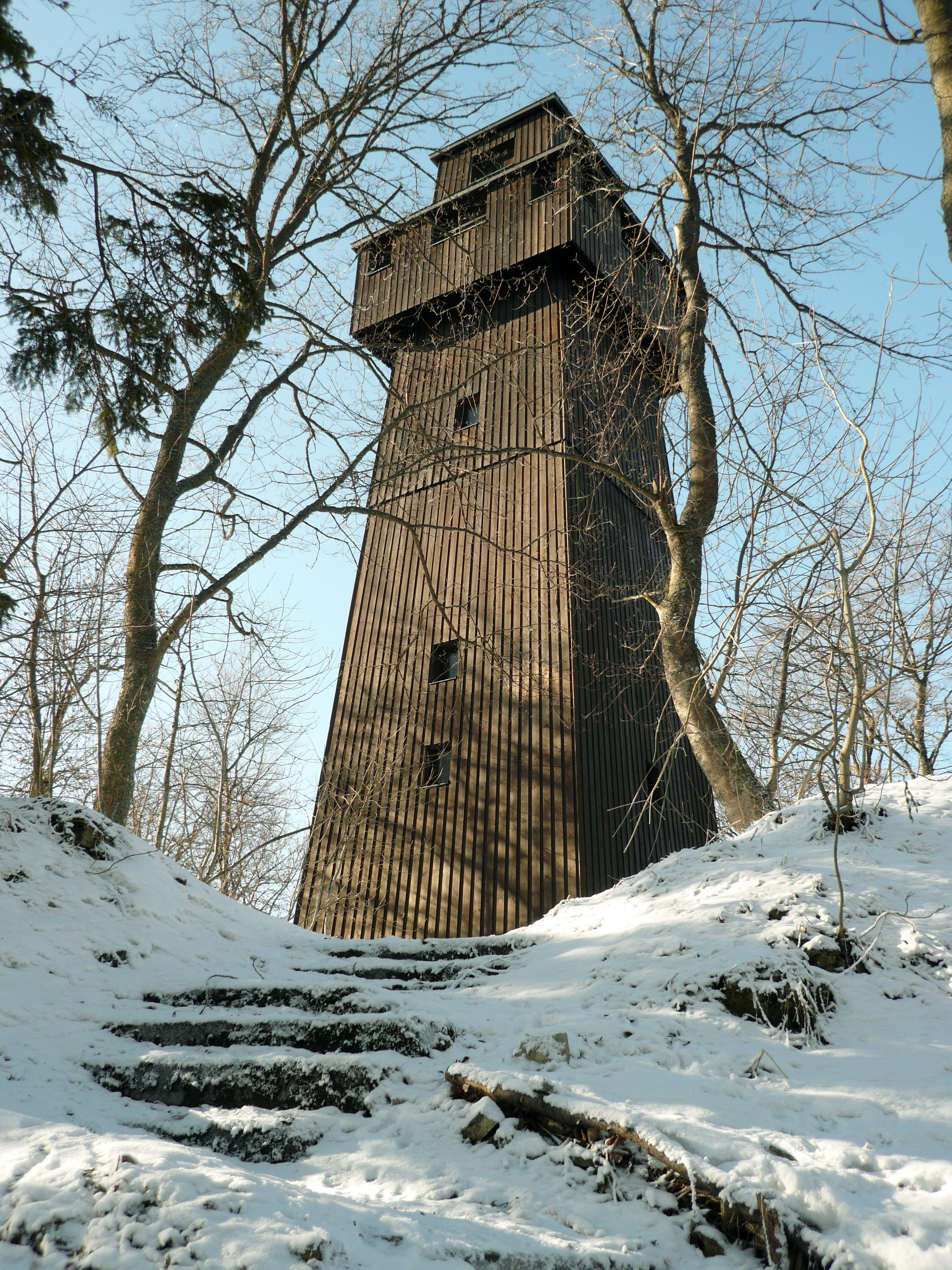
- Lupfenturm, a tower at the summit of Lupfen

Highest point
- Elevation: 977 m (3,205 ft)

Geography
- Location: Baden-Württemberg, Germany

Lupfen (or Hohenlupfen) is a mountain of Baden-Württemberg, Germany. It is the highest point in the Baar, having its elevation at 977 metres (3,205 ft). The mountain is called "King of the Baar" as it is an outlier. Hohenlupfen Castle was located on this mountain, which is where the Counts of Lupfen had resided for 500 years.
