= Johann of Limburg =

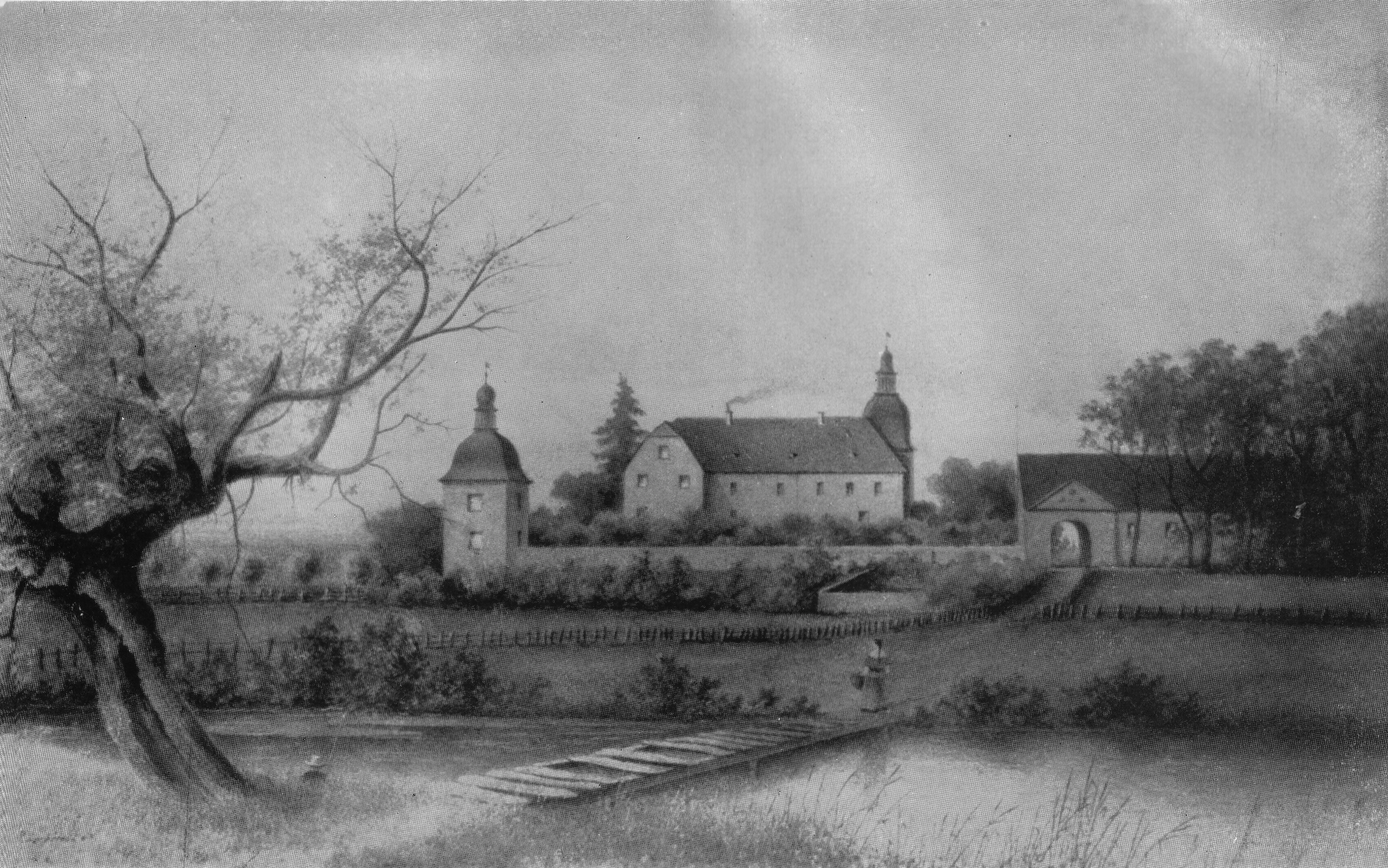
Schloss Stirum, 1850

Johann of Limburg, gt von Stirum (died before 1364), son of lord Dietrich II of Limburg Stirum and Bertrada of Götterswick. And a cousin of Diederik II count of Limburg Hohenlimburg.

He married (1st) Uda von Ravensberg and (2nd) Margareta von Ahaus, and had four children:

- Dietrich III of Limburg, zu Styrum (fl. 1347/91);
- Johann, a canon at Mülheim an der Ruhr;
- Hermann (fl. 1385);
- Jutta, married to Eberhard von der Leyten.

== Literature ==
- W. Gf v. Limburg Stirum, "Stamtafel der Graven van Limburg Stirum", 's Gravenhage 1878; (outdated)
- Bleicher, W. [German] Monatsschrift des Vereins für Orts- und Heimatkunde Hohenlimburg “Geschichte der Grafschaft Limburg”. Hohenlimburger Heimatblätter.Jhrg.1993-2013.
