= Isenberg =

County of medieval Germany

Isenberg was a County of medieval Germany. It was a partition of the county of Altena and was annexed to Limburg (Lenne) in 1242.

== Counts of Isenberg (1191–1242) ==
Counts of Isenburg (1191-1242)
| Name | Lifespan | Reign | Spouse |
|---|---|---|---|
| Arnold of Altena | 1166 - 1209 | 1180-1209 | Mathilde of Cleve |
| Frederick of Isenberg | 1193 – 15 November 1226 | 1209-15 November 1226 | Sophie of Limburg |
| Dietrich I of Isenberg | before 1215-1301 | 1226-1301 | Adelheid of Sayn |

== Sources ==
- R. Gerstner, Geschichte der Lothringischen Pfalzgrafschaft, Seite 14f.Nonn, Pagus, Anm.290; H.R.I.Nr.76, S.174 v.15.4.958/59: Erenfridus comes in comitatu Hoyensi (Huy); ebd.Nr.77, S.175, v.8.5.959; D.O.I 89v. 4.5.947: in pago Hatteri (Hatuarien) zwischen Rhein und Maas in comitatu Erenfridi; s. a. D.O.I 316 v.17.1.966; Lac. IV.Nr.604a,945:in Pago bunnensi in comitatu Erenfridi comitis; VK II, S.248:in Pago Tulpiacense in comitatu Erenfridi comitis; belegt 941-966 mit Zülpichgau, Bonngau, Hattuariengau, Eifelgau, Ruhrgau, Keldachgau
- Melchers, B. Die altesten Grafen von Berg bis zu ihrem Aussterben 1225. Zeitschrift des bergischen Geschichtsvereins, Jahrgang 7, diss. Marburg, 1911
- Kraus, Thomas R. Die Entstehung der Landesherrschaft der Grafen von Berg bis zum Jahre 1225, Neustadt an der Aisch 1981
- Andernach, Norbert, Entwicklung der Grafschaft Berg, in: Land im Mitelpunkt der Mächte. Die Herzogtümer Jülich-Kleve-Berg, Kleve 1984, S. 63–73.
- Holdt, Ulrike, Die Entwicklung des Territoriums Berg (Karte und Beiheft V/16 = Geschichtlicher Atlas der Rheinlande, Lieferung 11), Bonn 2008.
- Bibliothek Nationale (Paris) msfr.5230. L'armorial Bellenville of Armorial Beaulaincourt
- Aders, G. Die Grafen (von Limburg) und die Herrn von Limburg-Styrum aus dem Haus Berg-Altena-Isenberg. Zeitschift Der Marker 1956 blad 7.
- Quadflieg, Eberhard LXXVIII Table 5. Die grafen von Altena, Isenberg und Limburg
- Berg, A. Archive fur Sippenforschung Heft 14. Jahrgang 30. Mai 1964
- Van Limburg, H. Graven van Limburg Hohenlimburg & Broich. 2016
- Eversberg, H. Graf Friederich von Isenberg und die Isenburg 1193-1226. Hattingen 1989
- Bleicher, W. Hohenlimburgher Heimatblätter fűr den Raum Hagen und Isenlohn. Beiträge zur Landeskunde. Monatsschrift des Vereins fűr Orts- und Heimatkunde Hohenlimburg e.V. Drűck Geldsetzer und Schäfer Gmbh. Iserlohn 1993-2013
