= Dietrich I of Isenberg =

First Count of Limburg

Dietrich I was the last count of Isenberg and Altena, the first count of Limburg (Limburg a.d. Lenne) (before 1215 – 1301), son of Friedrich II of Isenberg, count of Isenberg and Altena.

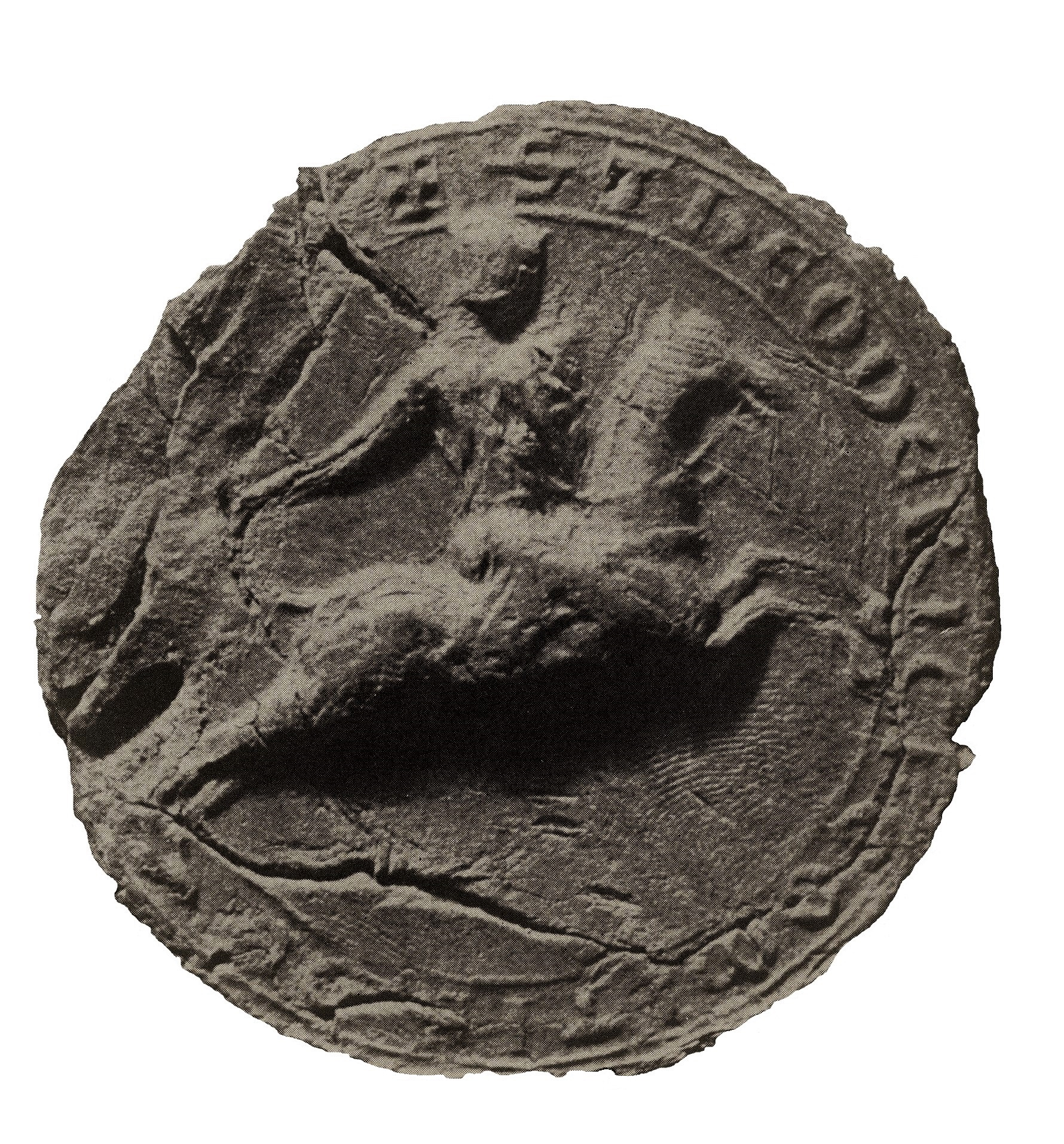
Waxseal of count Dietrich I of Limburg Hohenlimburg 1246

Dietrich I was disinherited of all his territories in the Holy Roman Empire (present-day Germany) following the execution of his father, but with the military support of his uncle the Duke of Limburg (Vesdre), recovered a small territory out of his previous possessions. He built the castles of Limburg (Hohenlimburg) and Neu Isenberg (soon lost in favour of the counts von der Mark) and took the title of count of Limburg "comes de Ysenberghe et de Limborch".

== Heir of the line ==
Count Diederik I of Limburg had three sons, Hendrik, Johan and Everhard. The eldest, Hendrik, died young around 1248. Brother Johan died before May 1277. Everhard died before May 28, 1308, aged 55. During their lifetime, both deceased brothers were not known by charter as Count of Limburg. In the kept original charters of January 28, 1287 and May 20, 1296, just Everhard appears as a count together with his father Diederik. "Theodericus comes senior de Lymburg" & "Everhardus comes de Lymburg" with the edge lettering of his seal COMITIS EV(erhar)DI LIMBURGE(nsis) On coins of his descendants THEODERI-COMES. Diederik I's patrimony was guaranteed in 1296 by son Everhard I and grandson Diederik III(II). Who was 20 years old at the time. Everhard for more than 30 years, together with his father, contributed the struggle for the conquest of the county and former allodial Isenberger family property. In 1301 he was the 'nearest in the bloodline', and succeeded his father.

Other grandsons, Diederik II lord of Stirum and brother Frederik canon in Cologne, were not short of anything. Were, not hear of the line but as descendants, richly endowed with allodial estates, Stirum castle and associated lordship. Granddaughter Mechteld of Limburg Stirum married to Lord Egbert I of Almelo. There was no straight fief and primogeniture, but a well-considered balance between the then legitimate inheritance rights of his sons and daughters.

== Offspring ==
Dietrich married Aleidis (Adelheid), countess of Sayn, a daughter of Johann I von Spanheim and Adelheid von Altena. They had issue:

- Heinrich of Limburg (living 1240-1246);
- Johann ancestor of the Lords of Limburg-Styrum (born before 1246, died before 1277). He married Agnes von Wildenberg;
- Elisabeth countess of Limburg (born before 1253, died 1311). She married Heinrich von Wildenburg, son of Gerhard II von Wildenburg;
- Sophie countess of Limburg-Isenberg (born before 1253), married to Bertold VI von Buren, Marschall of Westfalia (born before 1284, died after 1320), a son of Bertold IV von Buren and Dedel von Arnsberg;
- Adelheid (born before 1253, died after 1266). She married Albert II Ritter von Hoerde (born before 1226, died after 1266);
- Everhard I, ancestor of Counts of Limburg-Hohenlimburg and Broich (born before 1271, died after 1304. 1308 He married Agnes N.(probable of Volmarsteyn)

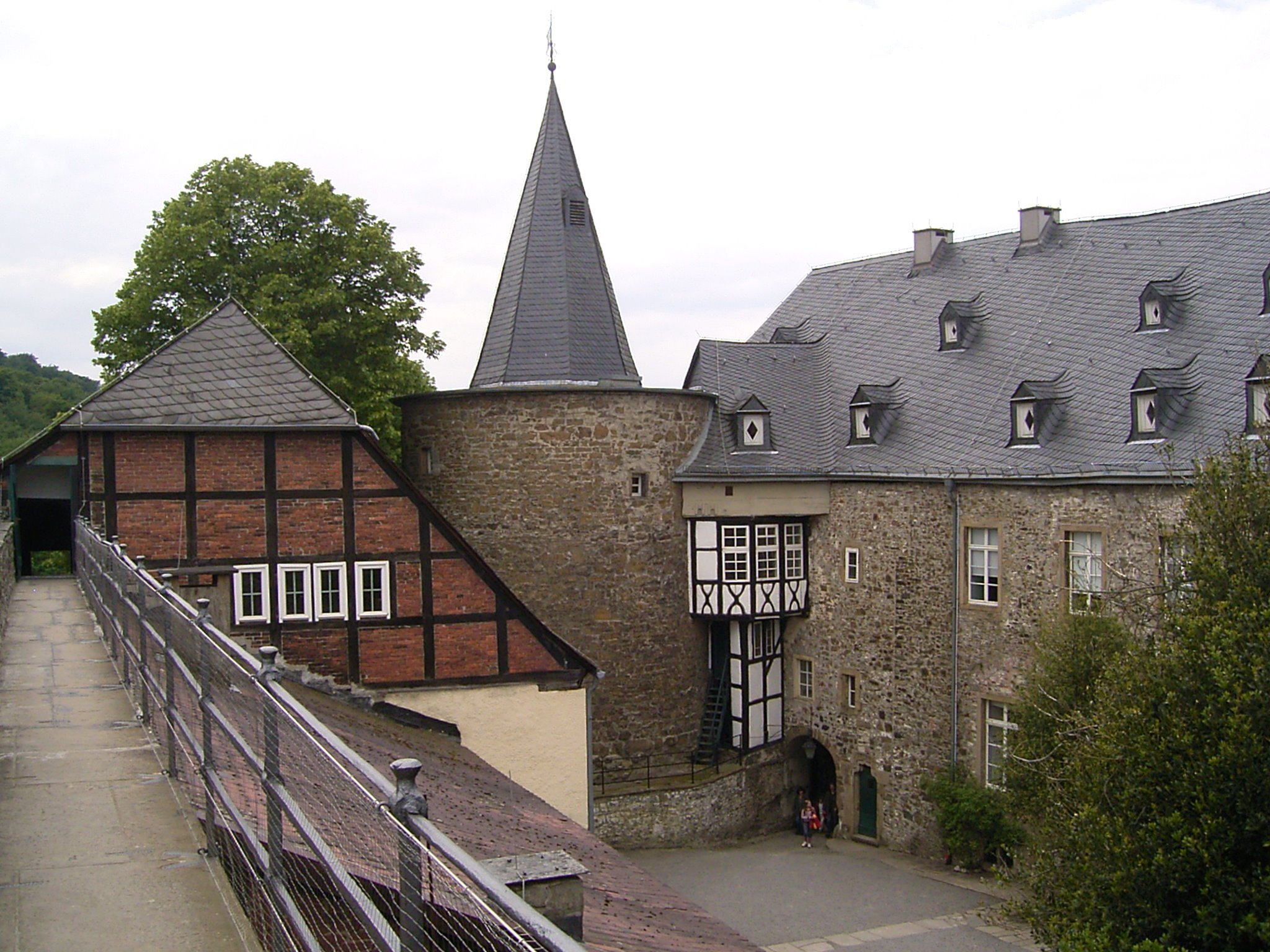
Count Dietrich von Altena-Isenberg, fought to retrieve his paternal inheritance and built the castle of Limburg an der Lenne.

== Literature ==
- Hoederath, H.T. Der Fall des Hauses Isenberg 1225/1226 . In rechtsgeschichterlicher und soziologischer Schau, 1954 Zeitschrift der Savigny stiftung fur Rechtsgeschichte. Kanonistische Abteilung
- Aders, G. Die Grafen (von Limburg) und die Herrn von Limburg-Styrum aus dem Haus Berg-Altena-Isenberg. Zeitschift 'Der Marker" 1956 blad 7.
- Berg, A. Lineage counts of Limburg Hohenlimburg and Linage Lords of Limburg-Styrum. Archive fur Sippenforschung Heft 14. Jahrgang 30. Mai 1964.
- Korteweg, K.N. Dietrich I Graf von Limburg Hohenlimburg. His two descendant lines Lords of Limburg Styrum and counts of Limburg Hohenlimburg. De Nederlandse Leeuw Jaargang LXXXI no.8 August 1964.
- Eversberg, H. Graf Friederich von Isenberg und die Isenburg 1193-1226. Hattingen 1989
- Bleicher, W. Hohenlimburgher Heimatblätter fűr den Raum Hagen und Isenlohn. Beiträge zur Landeskunde. Monatsschrift des Vereins fűr Orts- und Heimatkunde Hohenlimburg e.V. Drűck Geldsetzer und Schäfer Gmbh. Iserlohn. County of Limburg Lenne. 1976-2012
- Spiess. K. H Das Lehnswesen in den frühen deutschen Lehnsverzeichnissen. In: Dendorfer / Deutinger, Lehnswesen im Hochmittelalter, S. 91–102;./ feudal records in medieval Germany. In: NIEUS J.F (Hg.), Le vassal, le fief et l’écrit. Pratiques d’écriture et enjeux documentaires dans le champ de la féodalité XIe–XVe Early century. Spiess. K. H Formalisierte Autorität: Entwicklungen im Lehnsrecht des 13. Jahrhunderts. In: Historische Zeitschrift 295 (2012), S. 62–77. / Das älteste Lehnsbuch der Pfalzgrafen bei Rhein vom Jahr 1401. Edition und Erläuterungen (Veröffentlichungen der Kommission für Geschichtliche Landeskunde in Baden-Württemberg, Reihe A/30), Stuttgart 1981
- Krieger. K.F Die Lehnshoheit der deutschen Könige im Spätmittelalter (ca. 1200–1437) (Untersuchungen zur deutschen Staats- und Rechtsgeschichte NF 23), Aalen 1979;
