= County of Lupfen =

Historical territory of the Holy Roman Empire

County of Lupfen Grafschaft Lupfen
- 1065–1582
- Coat of arms

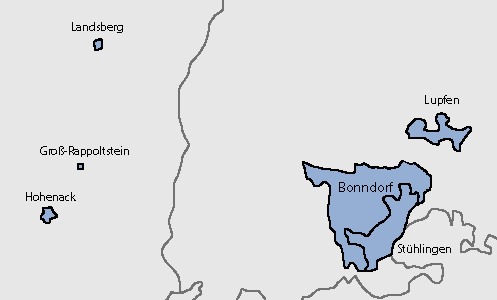
- The Count of Lupfen's feudal possessions in the 15th century
- Status: State of the Holy Roman Empire
- Capital: Hohenlupfen (1065–1420); Stühlingen (1420–1582)
- Common languages: German
- Religion: Roman Catholic
- Demonyms: Lupfener; Lupfensche
- Government: Feudal monarchy
- Count
  - 1562–1582: Count Heinrich IV (last)
- Historical era: Middle Ages
  - Established: 1065
  - Disestablished: 1582
Preceded by
County of Bonndorf
Landgraviate of Stühlingen
Lordship of Rappoltstein-Groß-Rappoltstein
Succeeded by
Lordship of Pappenheim
Lordship of Mörsberg
- Today part of: Germany; France

The County of Lupfen (German: Grafschaft Lupfen) was an estate of the Holy Roman Empire based in Hohenlupfen castle in Talheim, which is first mentioned in 1065. The counts of Lupfen possessed territories in Alsace and Baden-Württemberg. It was closely associated with the Landgraviate of Stühlingen.

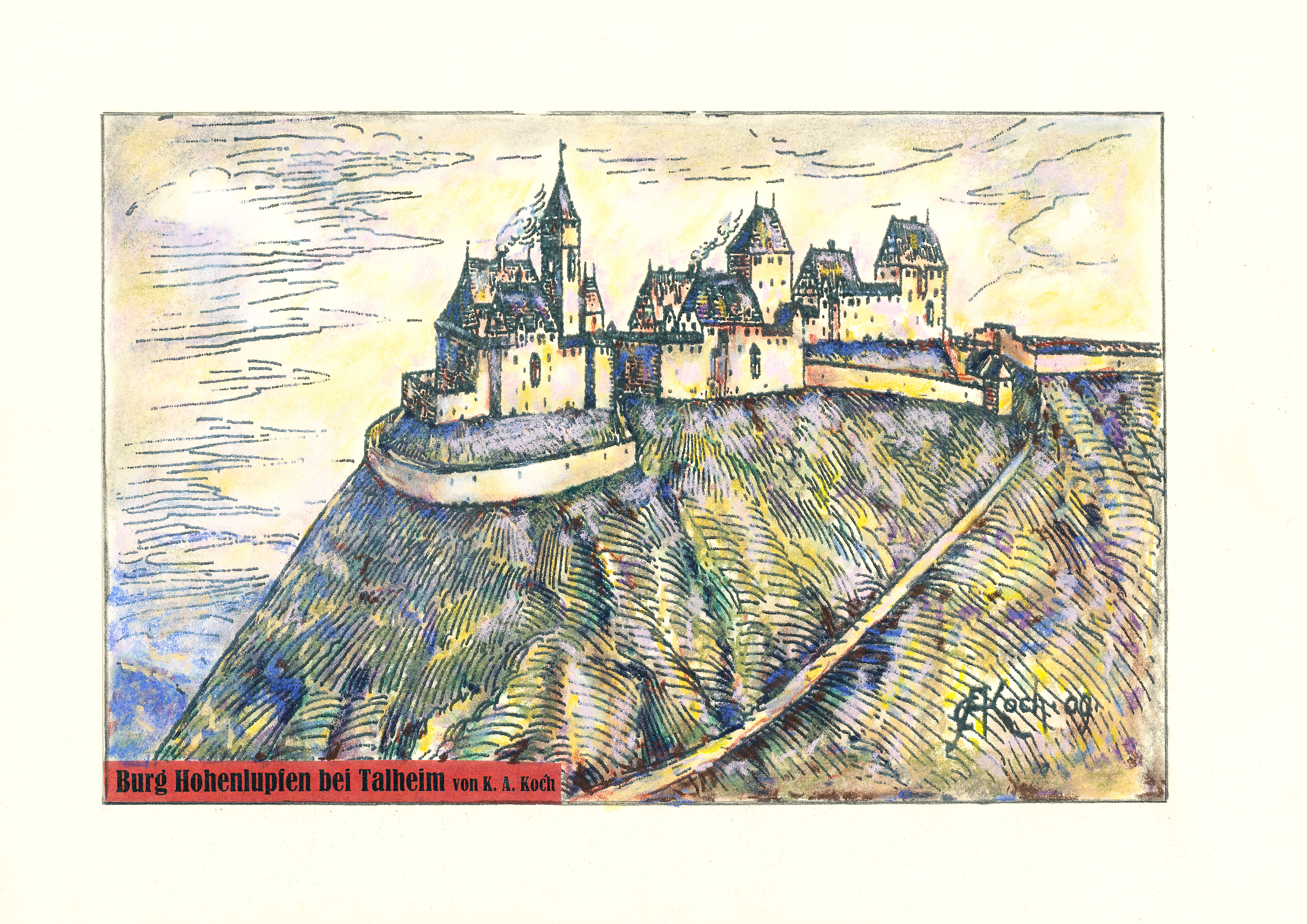
Hohenlupfen Castle in Talheim

In 1251, the counts of Lupfen inherited the Landgraviate of Stühlingen. The current coat of arms of the town of Stühlingen is derived from this.

The year prior, the County of Bonndorf was also inherited by them. The large territorial acquisitions allowed the counts to call themselves Landgraves.

The Lupfens inherited Groß-Rappoltstein and Hohenack in 1398 through marriage with the former wife of the last count.

In 1420, The Hohenlupfen castle in Talheim was abandoned for Stühlingen/Hohenlupfen Castle, in Stühlingen.

In 1582, the last count of Lupfen, Heinrich IV died at 39 years old with no male descendants. Because of this, the House of Lupfen went extinct and the lands were divided between the nephew of his through his sister, belonging to the House of Mörsberg, and the Marshals of Pappenheim.
