= Limburg-Isenberg =

German county during the Middle Ages

Limburg-Isenberg was a German county during the Middle Ages. It was a partition of the Duchy of Limburg, located in the County of Isenberg. Limburg-Isenberg was further partitioned into county Limburg-Hohenlimburg and lordship Limburg-Styrum.

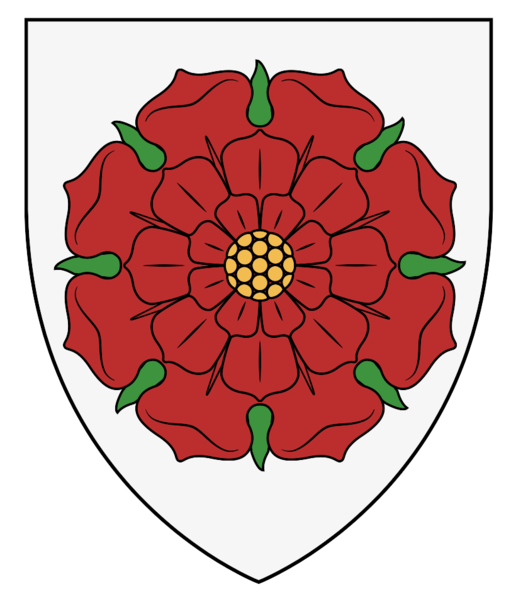
Coat of Arms county of Isenberg

== Counts of Limburg-Isenberg (1196/1204 - 1297/1301) ==
- Frederik I Count of Altena Isenberg(1196/1204 - 1226)
- Theodoric I since 1242 Diederick I of Limburg, count of the Hohenlimburg on the river Lenne.(1215 - 1301 (Count of Altena and Isenberg) Son of Frederik I van Isenberg
- Frederick II (1217 - 1226) son of Frederik I van Isenberg

== Literature ==
- Aders, G. Die Grafen (von Limburg) und die Herrn von Limburg-Styrum aus dem Haus Berg-Altena-Isenberg. Zeitschift 'Der Marker" 1956 blad 7.
- Berg, A. Archive fur Sippenforschung Heft 14. Jahrgang 30. Mai 1964.
- Korteweg, K.N. Dietrich I Graf von Limburg Hohenlimburg. De Nederlandse Leeuw Jaargang LXXXI no.8 August 1964.
- Eversberg, H. Graf Friederich von Isenberg und die Isenburg 1193-1226. Hattingen 1989

== Sources ==
- Berg, A. 1964.[German] Archive fur Sippenforschung Heft 14. Jahrgang 30. Mai 1964
- Bleicher, W. 1977 - 1993 [German] “Scheidevertrag Limburg und Mark” in “Sieben Graben” Hohenlimburger Heimatblätter. Monatsschrift des Vereins für Orts- und Heimatkunde Hohenlimburg e.V. Jg., 1977 Heft Nr. 12 / “Geschichte der Grafschaft Limburg”. Hohenlimburger Heimatblätter. Jg., 1993 Heft Mai.
- Korteweg, K.N. 1964 De Nederlandse Leeuw Jrg. LXXXI 1964 fol. 266-276.
- Kraus, T R., 1981 [German] Die Entstehung der Landesherrschaft der Grafen von Berg bis zum Jahre 1225, Neustadt an der Aisch
- Van Limburg, H. 2016 [Dutch]. Graven van Limburg Hohenlimburg & Broich. (search term: bol.com 9789492185594)
