= Limburg-Hohenlimburg =

Former German county

Coordinates: 51.3636°N 7.5675°E

Limburg-Hohenlimburg was a county in Germany in the Middle Ages.

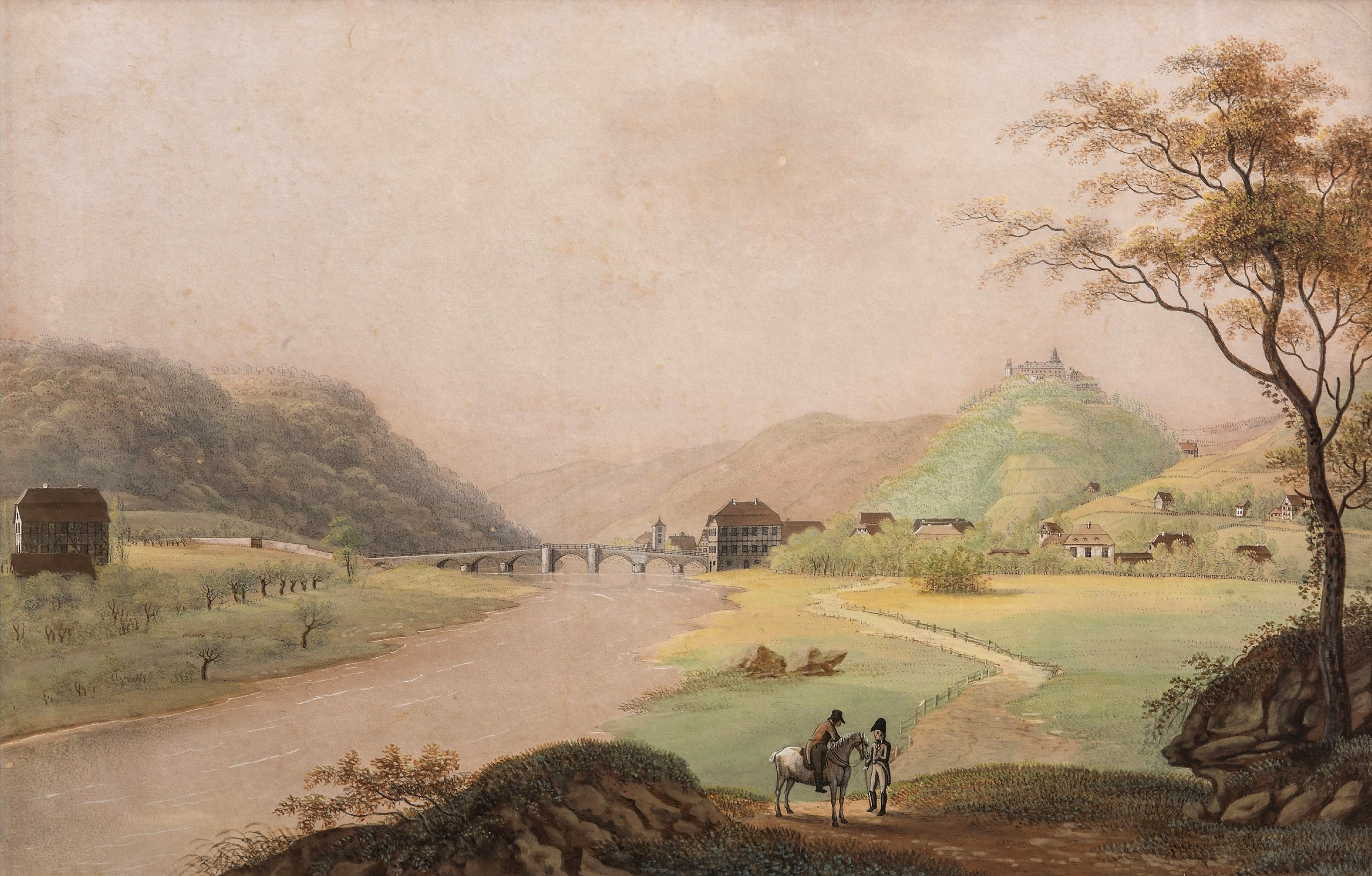
Hohenlimburg on the river Lenne

It was created as a partition of Limburg-Isenberg by Diederck I of Isenberg, who called himself in 1246 Diederick I van Limburg. Diederik had three sons, Hendrik, Johan and Everhard. The eldest, Hendrik, died young around 1248. Brother Johan died before May 1277. Everhard died before May 28, 1308, aged 55. During their lifetime, both deceased brothers were not known by charter as Count of Limburg. In the kept original charters of January 28, 1287 and May 20, 1296, just Everhard appears as a count together with his father Diederik. Theodericus comes senior de Lymburg & Everhardus comes de Lymburg appear as heir in the line, with the edge lettering of his seal COMITIS EV(erhar)DI LIMBURGE(nsis) On coins of his descendants THEODERI-COMES. Diederik I's patrimony was guaranteed in 1296 by son Everhard I and grandson Diederik III(II). Who was 20 years old at the time and had earned his spurs. Everhard had continued more than 30 years, the struggle with his father for the conquest of former Isenberger family property he was in 1301 the 'nearest in the bloodline', and succeeded his father.

== Two houses of Limburg ==
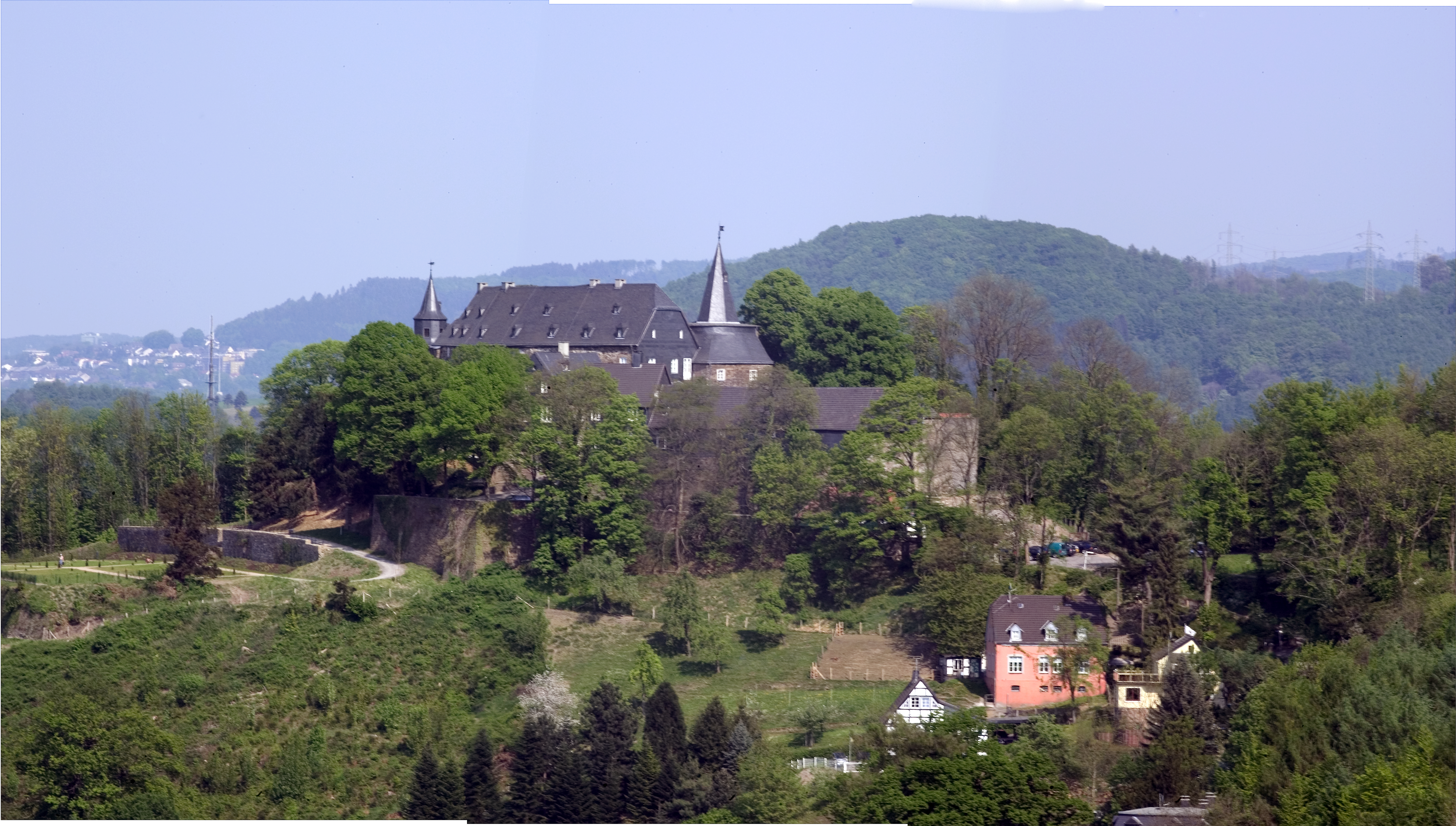
The Castle of Hohenlimburg

Other grandsons, Diederik II lord of Stirum and brother Frederik canon in Cologne, were not short of anything. Were, not hear of the line but as descendants, richly endowed with allodial estates, Stirum castle and associated lordship. Granddaughter Mechteld of Limburg Stirum married to Lord Egbert I of Almelo. There was no straight fief and primogeniture, but a well-considered balance between the then legitimate inheritance rights of his three grandsons and two granddaughters. The house of Limburg since then was divided in the house Counts of Limburg-Hohenlimburg, later on the house of Limburg Hohenlimburg and Lordship of Broich and the house of Limburg-Styrum, still exists today. Limburg-Hohenlimburg passed to the Daun-Falkenstein in 1511, then Neuenahr-Alpen in 1542. Limburg-Hohenlimburg became a possession of the counts of Bentheim at the end of the 16th century, who kept it until it was mediatized to the Grand Duchy of Berg in 1808. The prince of Bentheim-Tecklenburg still owns the fortress of Hohenlimburg.

== Family Branches ==
- John I (1247–1277) Ancestor of the Lordschip Limburg-Styrum
- Eberhard I (1253-1308) Ancestor of the Counts of Limburg Hohenlimburg and Broich

== Literature ==
- Kraus, Thomas R., Die Entstehung der Landesherrschaft der Grafen von Berg bis zum Jahre 1225, Neustadt an der Aisch 1981
- Andernach, Norbert, Entwicklung der Grafschaft Berg. Land im Mittelpunkt der Mächte. Die Herzogtümer Jülich-Kleve-Berg, Kleve 1984, S. 63–73.
- Hoederath, H.T. Der Fall des Hauses Isenberg 1225/1226. Rechtsgeschichterlicher und soziologischer Schau, 1954 Zeitschrift der Savigny stiftung fur Rechtsgeschichte. Kanonistische Abteilung
- Aders, G. Die Grafen (von Limburg) und die Herrn von Limburg-Styrum aus dem Haus Berg-Altena-Isenberg. Zeitschift 'Der Marker" 1956 blad 7.
- Korteweg, K.N. Descendants of Dietrich I Graf von Limburg Hohenlimburg. (Corrected lineage). De Nederlandse Leeuw Jaargang LXXXI no.8 August 1964.
- Berg, A. Lineage counts of Limburg Hohenlimburg and Lords of Limburg-Styrum. (Same independent conclusion) Archive fur Sippenforschung Heft 14. Jahrgang 30. Mai 1964.
- Bleicher, W. Hohenlimburgher Heimatblätter fűr den Raum Hagen und Isenlohn. Beiträge zur Landeskunde. Monatsschrift des Vereins fűr Orts- und Heimatkunde Hohenlimburg e.V. Drűck Geldsetzer und Schäfer Gmbh. Iserlohn. County of Limburg Lenne. Historian and Editor: Publications in Hohenlimburger Heimatblätter 1976 bis zu 2012

== Sources ==
- Aders, G. 1956. [German] Die Grafen (von Limburg) und die Herrn von Limburg-Styrum aus dem Haus Berg-Altena-Isenberg. Zeitschift Der Marker 1956 blad 7.
- Berg, A. 1964. [German] Archive fur Sippenforschung Heft 14. Jahrgang 30. Mai 1964
- Bleicher, W. / Van Limburg H, 1998-2004 [German / Dutch] Neue Aspekte der Geschichte der Grafen von Hohen-Limburg und ihrer Nachkommen. In: Hohenlimburger Heimatblätter, Teil 1: 59, 1998, S. 81–93; Teil 2: 59, 1998, S. 201–213; Teil 3: 59, 1998, S. 281–294, 307–311; Teil 4: 63, 2002, S. 364–375, 386–390; Teil 5: 64, 2003, S. 210–214, 226–230 & Hefte (2004) S. 70–79.
- Korteweg, K.N. 1964.[Dutch] De Nederlandse Leeuw Jaargang LXXXI no.8 August 1964.
- Rudiger, R. / Barth, E.:1990 [German] Der Herzog in Lotharingien im 10. Jahrhundert. Jan Thorbecke Verlag Sigmaringen
- Van Limburg, H. 2016 [Dutch]. Graven van Limburg Hohenlimburg & Broich. ISBN 978-94-92185-59-4 and Regestbooks, two volumes ISBN 978-94-92185-60-0
