= Ferdinand IV of Limburg Stirum =

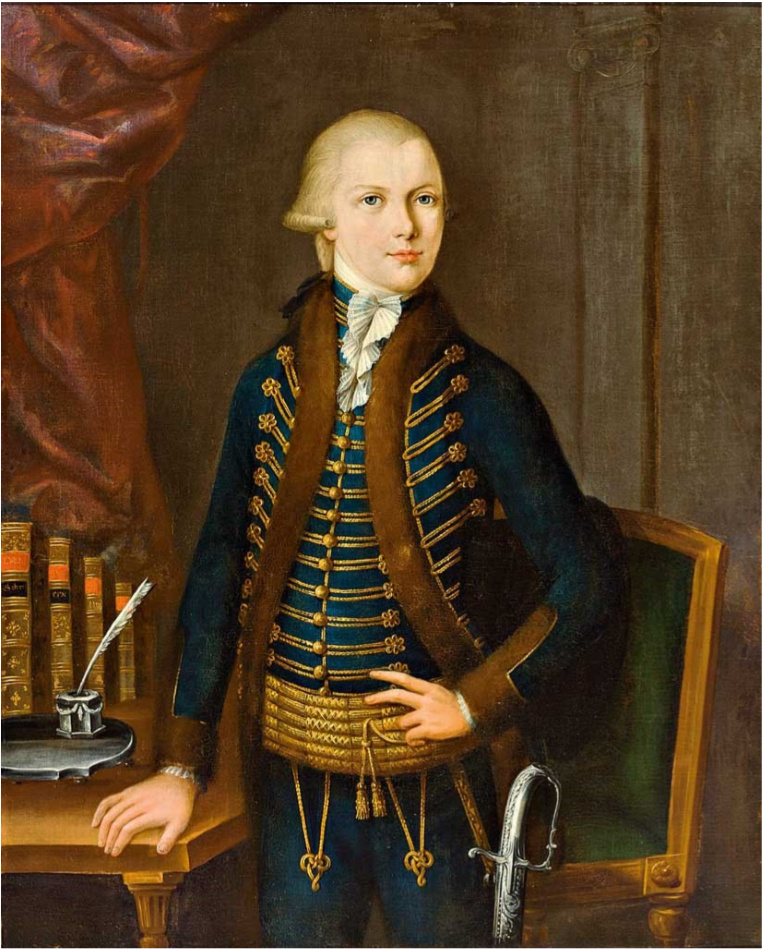
Portrait of Ferdinand IV, Count of Limburg-Stirum, in uniform, at the age of 11.

Ferdinand IV August Carl Joseph Johannes Nepomuk Thaddeus, Count of Limburg-Stirum zu Illereichen, (24 September 1785-5 December 1800) was sovereign lord of the immediate lordship of Gemen.

He was born in 1785, the son of Count Johann of Limburg Stirum and his wife Baroness Maria Walpurga vom Stain zu Rechtenstein.

At the age of 13, when his grandfather Karl Josef of Limburg Stirum died, he inherited the immediate lordship of Gemen along with the associated seat on the Bench of Counts of Westphalia in the Imperial Diet. He also inherited the fortress of Simontornya in Hungary. With his death at the age of 15, the Gemen-branch of the House of Limburg Stirum became extinct. Historians assume that the Styrum-branch of the House of Limburg Stirum took over his seat in the Imperial Diet.

Gemen went to Reichsfreiherr Aloys von Boineburg-Bömelberg Zu Erolsheim. It was mediatized in 1806 to the princes of Salm-Kyrburg.
