= Maximilian Wilhelm of Limburg Stirum =

Maximilian Wilhelm of Limburg Stirum (1653–1728), count of Limburg Styrum, sovereign lord of Illereichen and Simontornya. He was the third son of Adolf Ernst of Limburg Stirum, sovereign lord zu Gemen.

He married in 1677 countess Maria Anna von Rechberg and Rothenlöwen (died 1738). He left 14 children:

- Isabella Katharina Bernhardine (born 1680, died 1683);
- Leopold Otto Johann Wilhelm (born 1681, died 1726);
- Karl Joseph Alois (born 1685, died 1738);
- Maximilian Emmanuel Adolf Anton (born 1686, died 1705);
- Anna Isabelle Charlotte (born 1688, died 1773), married first in 1713 Baron Ignaz von Bonieburg, second Count Pyrrhus von Arco;
- Charlotte Amalia Barbara (born 1690, died 1691);
- Maria Aloisia Amalia Barbara (born 1692, died 1694);
- Amalia Lucia, (born 1693, died 1726);
- Maria Ludowika (born 1695, died 1725);
- Alexander Sigismund (born 1696, died 1764);
- Eva (born and died 1698);
- Julius Gottfried Dominicus (born 1699, died 1732);
- Ferdinand I Gotthard Meinrad, count of Limburg, Fürst von Styrum, sovereign lord zu Gemen (born 1701, died 1791);
- Johanna Theresia Emerentia (born and died in 1704).
