= Limburg-Styrum-Gemen =

Limburg-Styrum-Gemen; Limburg-Styrum-Gehmen
1644 – 1782
Capital; Circle; Bench	Gemen; Lower Rhenish-West. Counts of Westphalia
Partitioned from Limburg-Styrum	1644
Partitioned	1657
Extinct; to Limburg-Styrum-Iller-Aichheim	1782

Limburg-Styrum-Gemen was a county of medieval Germany, based in the Lordship of Gemen in modern North Rhine-Westphalia. It was partitioned from Limburg-Styrum in 1644, and in 1657 partitioned into itself and Limburg-Styrum-Iller-Aichheim. As Limburg-Styrum-Gemen ruled an Imperial Estate (Gemen), the Counts had a seat on the Bench of Counts of Westphalia. The line of Counts became extinct in 1782 and was inherited by the Counts of Limburg-Styrum-Iller-Aichheim.

== Counts of Limburg-Styrum-Gemen (1644–1782) ==
Name	Reign
Adolph Ernest	1644–1657
Herman Otto II	1657–1704
Otto Leopold Ernest	1704–1754
Frederick Charles	1754–1771
August Philip Charles	1771–1782
