= Borken, North Rhine-Westphalia =

Borken
- Town
- Coat of arms

- Location of Borken within Borken district
- Interactive map of Borken
- Location within Germany Location within North Rhine-Westphalia
- Coordinates: 51°50′N 6°52′E
- Country: Germany
- State: North Rhine-Westphalia
- Admin. region: Münster
- District: Borken
- Subdivisions: 12

Government
  - Mayor (2020–25): Mechtild Schulze-Hessing (CDU)

Area
  - Total: 152.97 km^{2} (59.06 sq mi)

Population (2025-12-31)
  - Total: 43,170
  - Density: 282.2/km^{2} (730.9/sq mi)
- Time zone: UTC+01:00 (CET)
  - Summer (DST): UTC+02:00 (CEST)
- Postal codes: 46325
- Dialling codes: 02861
- Vehicle registration: BOR

Borken (German pronunciation: [ˈbɔʁkn̩]; Westphalian: Buorken) is a town and the capital of the district of the same name, in North Rhine-Westphalia, Germany.

== Geography ==
Borken is situated 10 km east of the Dutch border. Borken station is the northern terminus on the remaining section of the Gelsenkirchen-Bismarck–Winterswijk railway.

=== Neighbouring places ===
- Raesfeld
- Heiden
- Südlohn
- Rhede
- Velen

=== Division of the town ===
Borken consists of 12 districts:

- Borken
- Borkenwirthe/Burlo
- Gemen
- Grütlohn
- Gemenwirthe
- Gemenkrückling
- Hoxfeld
- Hovesath
- Marbeck
- Rhedebrügge
- Weseke
- Westenborken

The 10 largest groups of foreign residents by 31 December 2018:

- Poland||627
- Syria||408
- Netherlands||262
- Romania||154
- Turkey||145
- Portugal||121
- Serbia||118
- Iraq||110
- Croatia||85
- Kosovo||79

== History ==
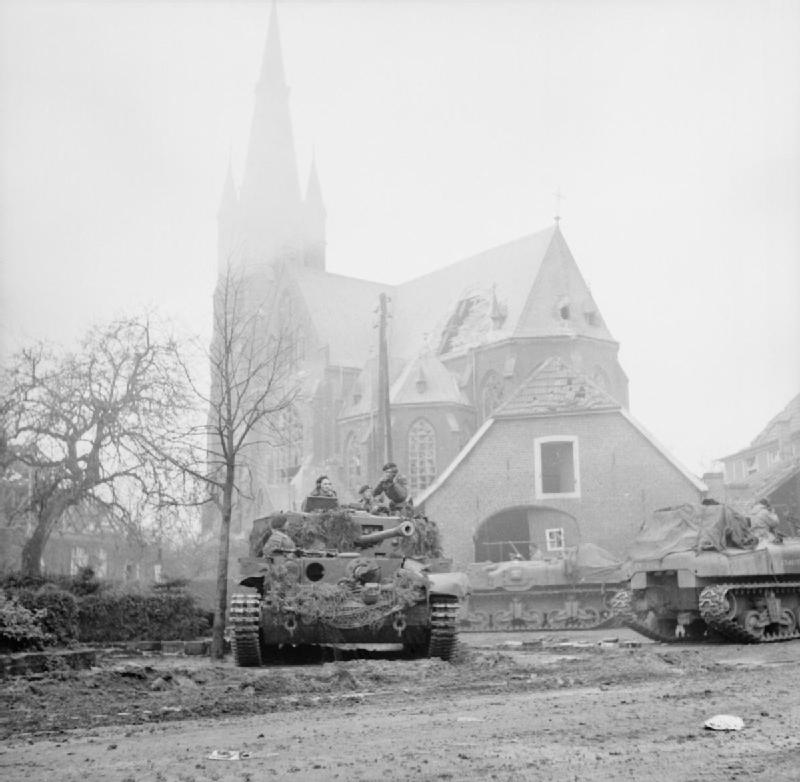
British troops from the 7th Armored Division in Weseke, Borken March, 1945

The name comes from the German word "Burg" or "Burk" and gradually changed to "Burke", then "Burken" and finally to "Borken". Around the year 800 the village was being used by Charles The Great (Charlemagne) as a stopover place on his travels. In 1226 City rights were granted by Bishop Dietrich II of Isenberg-Limburg. Fortification of the city with walls and towers was first noted in 1391.

From 1810 to 1814 it was part of the French Empire. In 1815 Borken came under the jurisdiction of the Prussian Province of Westphalia. At the same time it became the seat of government for the newly formed district or county of Borken (Kreis Borken). Between 1880 and 1905 the area experienced the building of railroad connections: (1880 Wanne-Borken-Winterswijk line, 1901 Empel-Bocholt-Borken and Borken-Burgsteinfurt, 1905 Borken-Coesfeld-Münster).

Toward the end of World War II, 90 percent of the old town, with its many shops and apartments, was destroyed by air raids. After the war, community rearrangements followed in 1969, including annexation of Gemen and other towns in the vicinity. Between 1975 and 1978 came the cleaning up and rebuilding of the southern part of the old city. There, buildings which had outlasted the destruction of the Second World War were finally demolished. In 2001 Borken celebrated its 775th anniversary.

== Population ==
Historical population

Year	Pop.	±% p.a.
1965	28,576	—
1970	29,500	+0.64%
1975	30,203	+0.47%
1980	32,412	+1.42%
1985	33,387	+0.59%
1990	36,049	+1.55%
1995	38,675	+1.42%

Year	Pop.	±% p.a.
2000	40,474	+0.91%
2005	41,028	+0.27%
2010	41,245	+0.11%
2015	42,272	+0.49%
2020	42,650	+0.18%
2025	43,170	+0.24%

Source: Landesdatabank Nordrhein-Westfalen

== Twin towns – sister cities ==
Borken is twinned with:

- Albertslund, Denmark
- Bolków, Poland
- Grabow, Germany
- Mölndal, Sweden
- Říčany, Czech Republic
- Whitstable, England, United Kingdom

== Notable people ==
=== Born in Borken ===
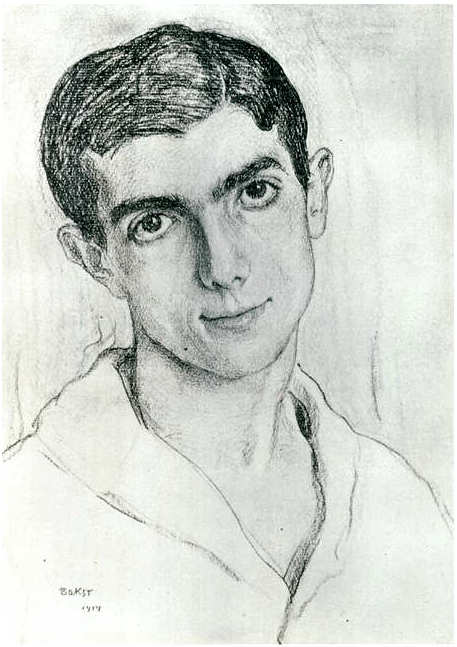
Leonide Massine in 1914

- Marvin Grumann (born 1993), footballer
- Cornelia "Coco" Maaßen (born 1999), handballer
- Otto Leopold of Limburg Stirum (1684–1754), Lord of Gemen and Raesfeld, General of the Imperial Army
- Jacques Palminger (born 1964), musician
- Jochen Schmidt (1936–2010), journalist and dance critic
- Ilse von Stach (1879–1941), writer

=== Connected with Borken ===
- Marcus Ehning (born 1974), jumping rider, lives in Borken-Weseke
- Herbert Lütkebohmert (1948–1993), footballer, lived in Borken and is buried here
- Léonide Massine (1896–1979), dancer and choreographer, died in Borken

== Gallery ==
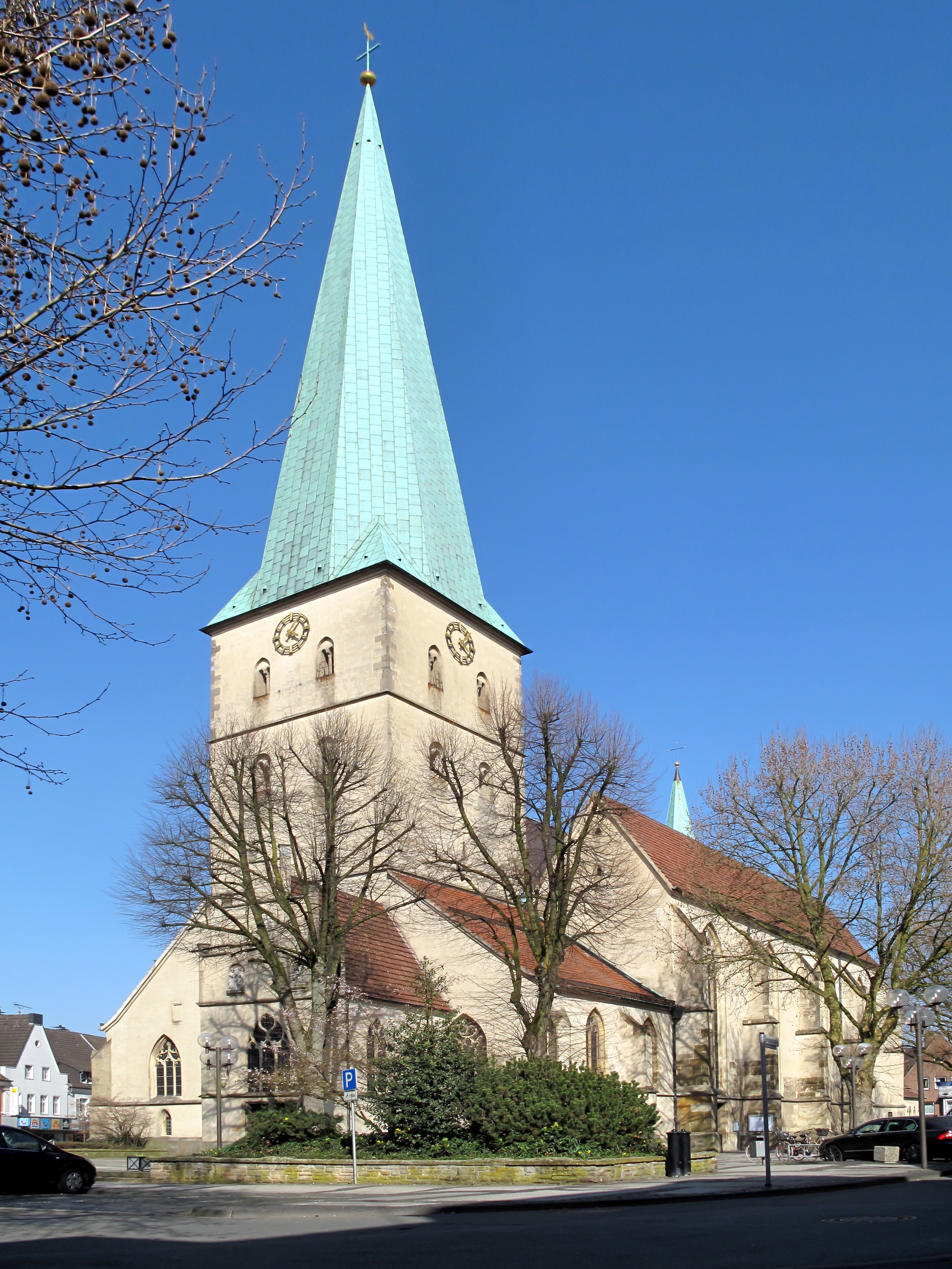
Church of Saint Remigius in Borken

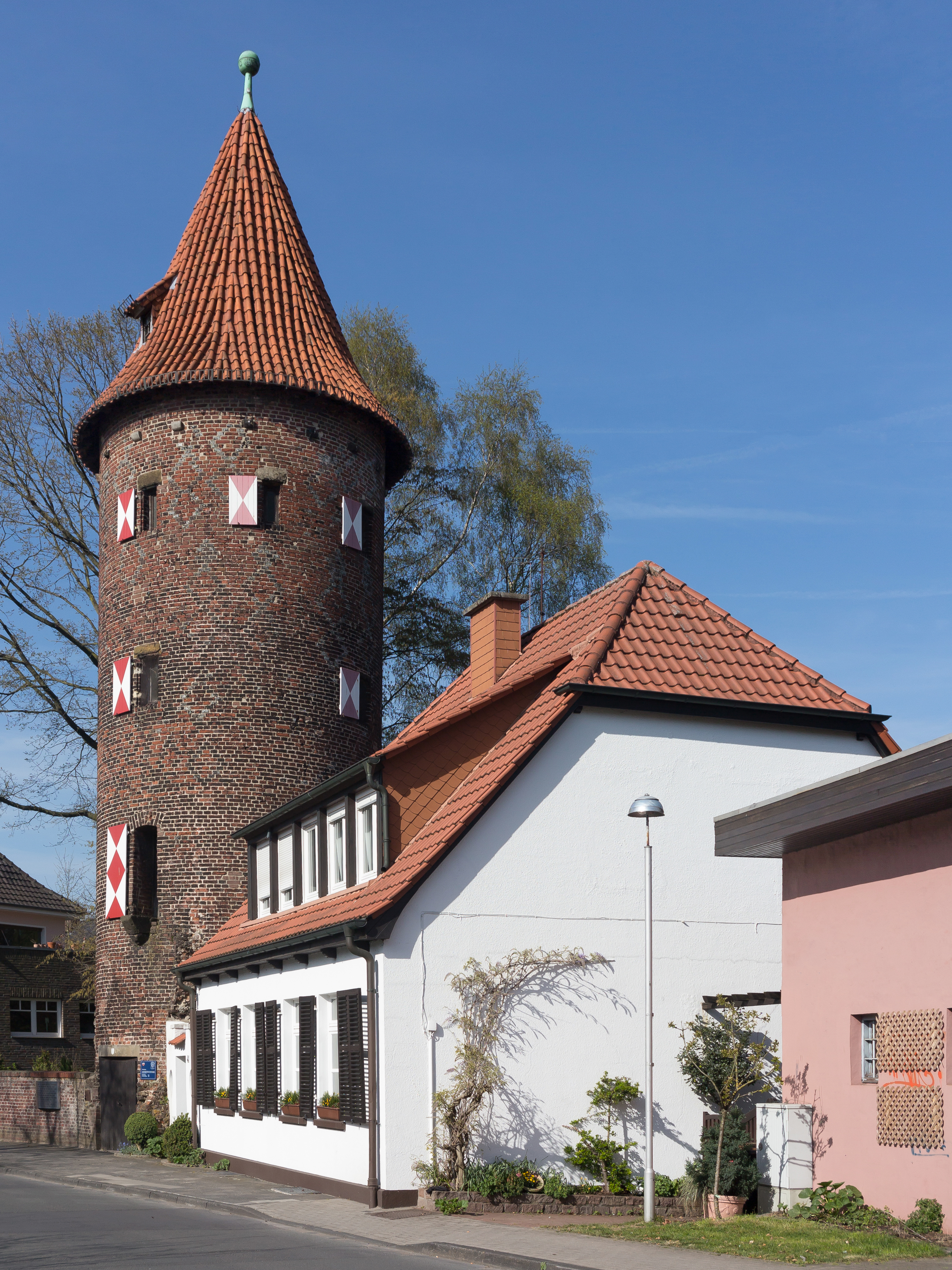
Tower in Borken

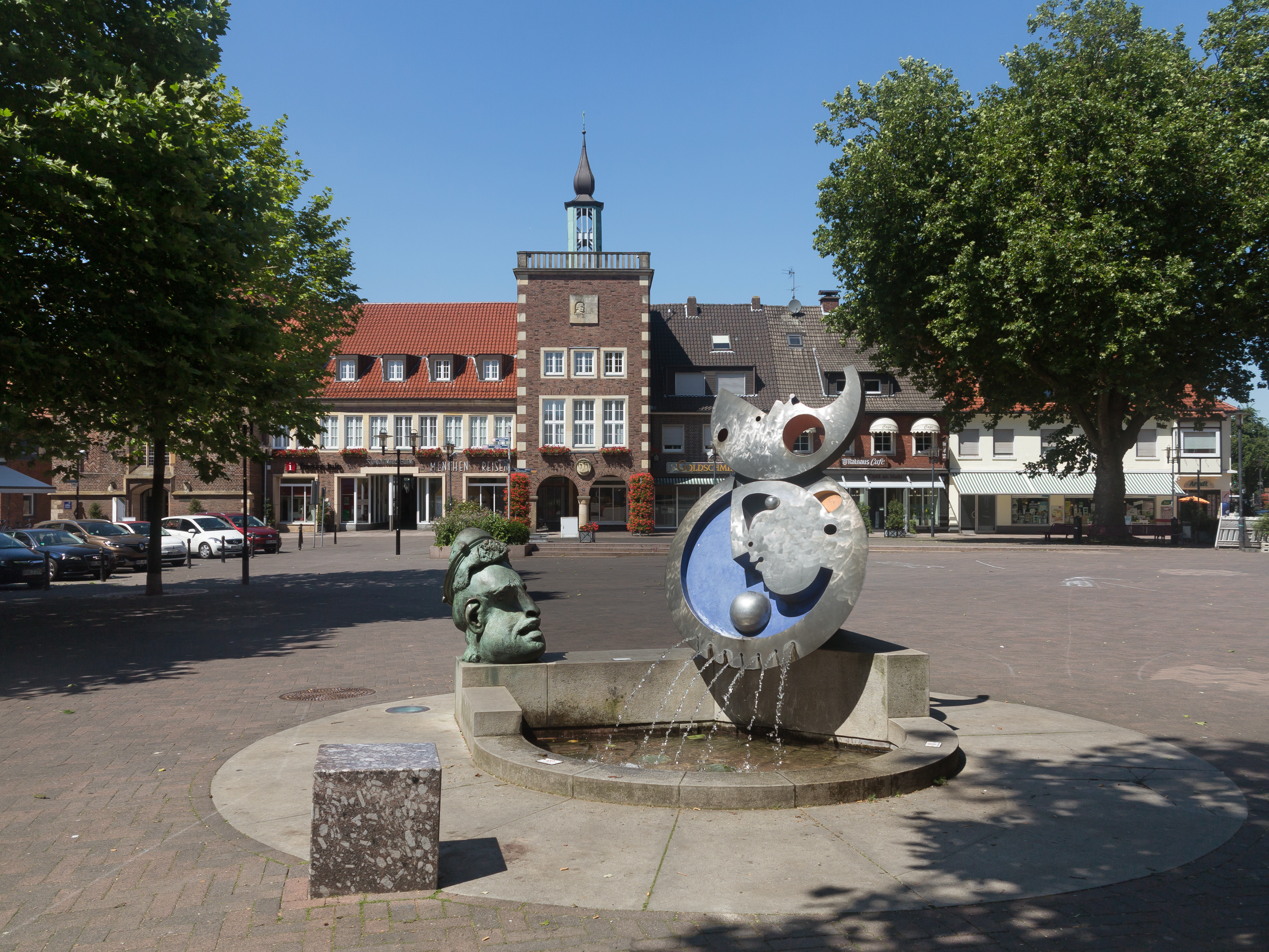
Sculpture at the Markt in Borken

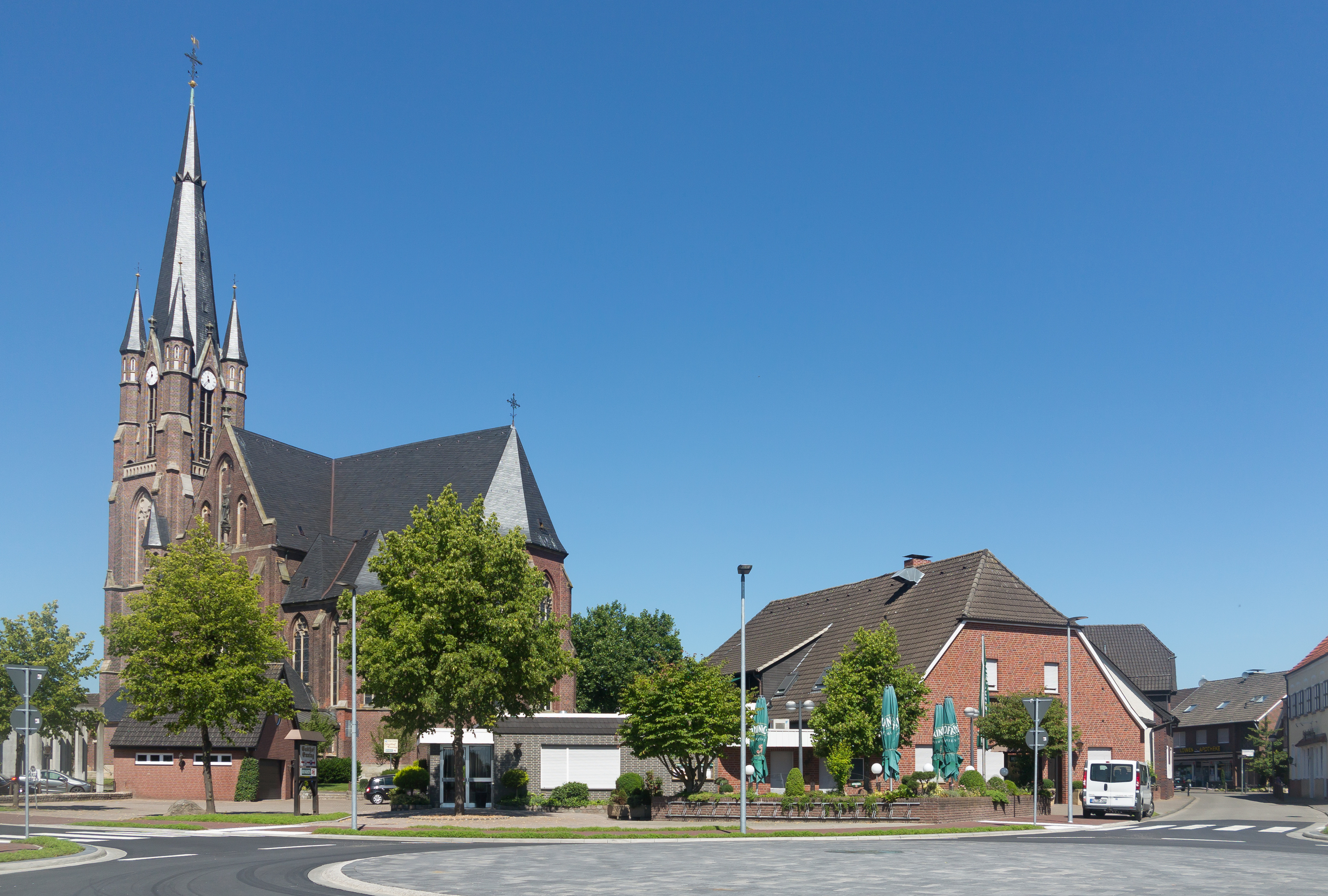
Church of Saint Ludgerus in Weseke

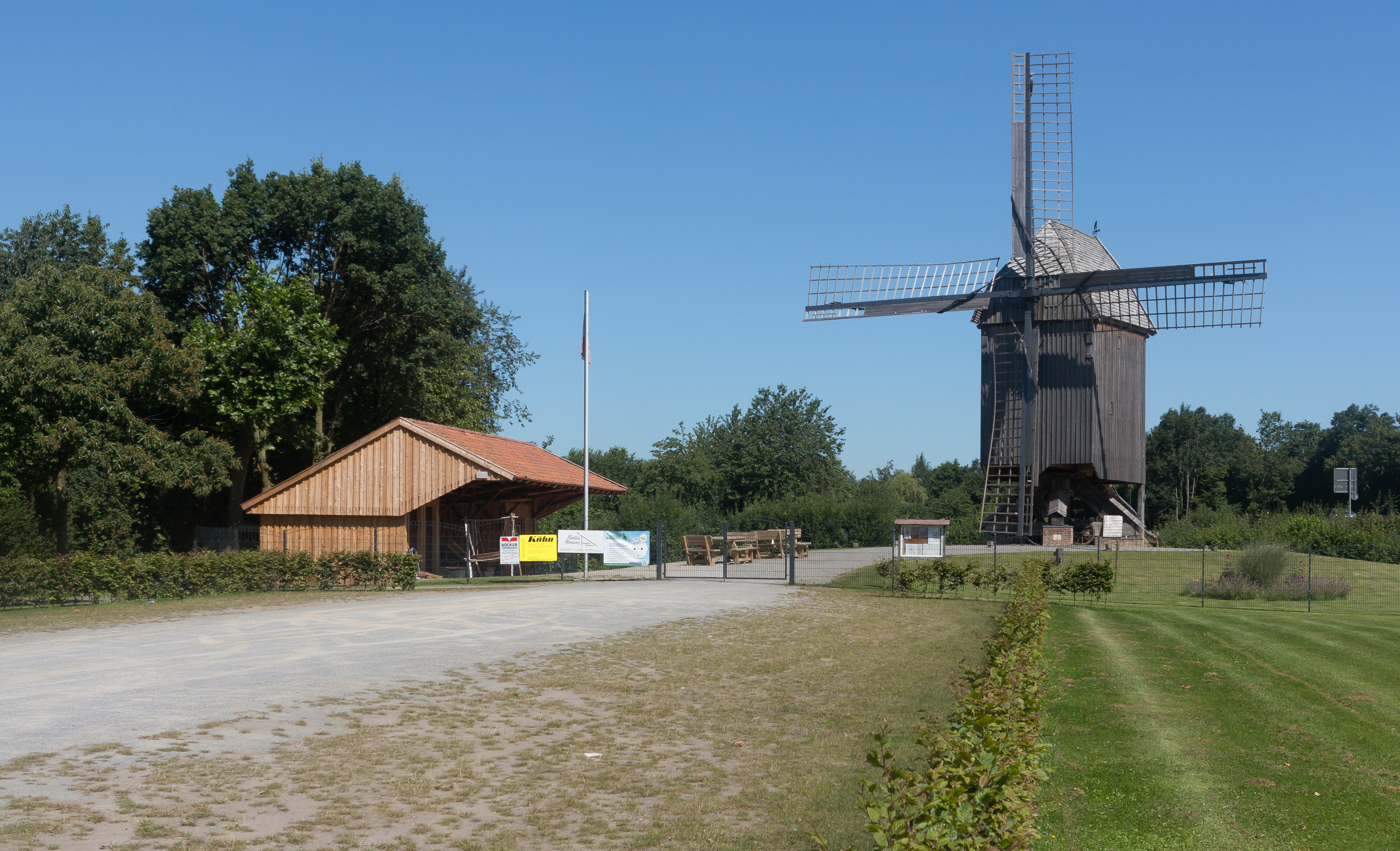
Windmill in Weseke

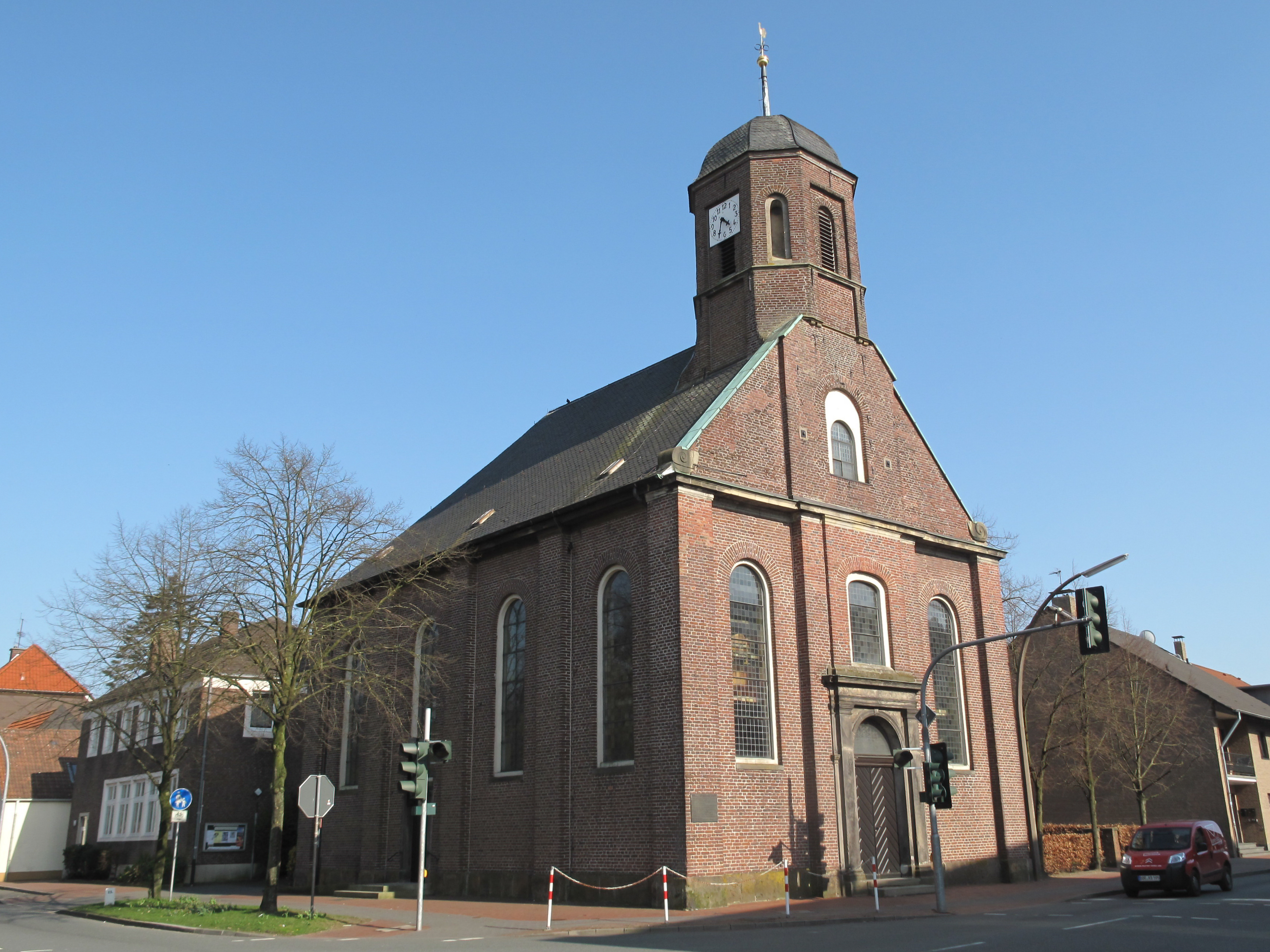
Johanneskirche Church in Gemen

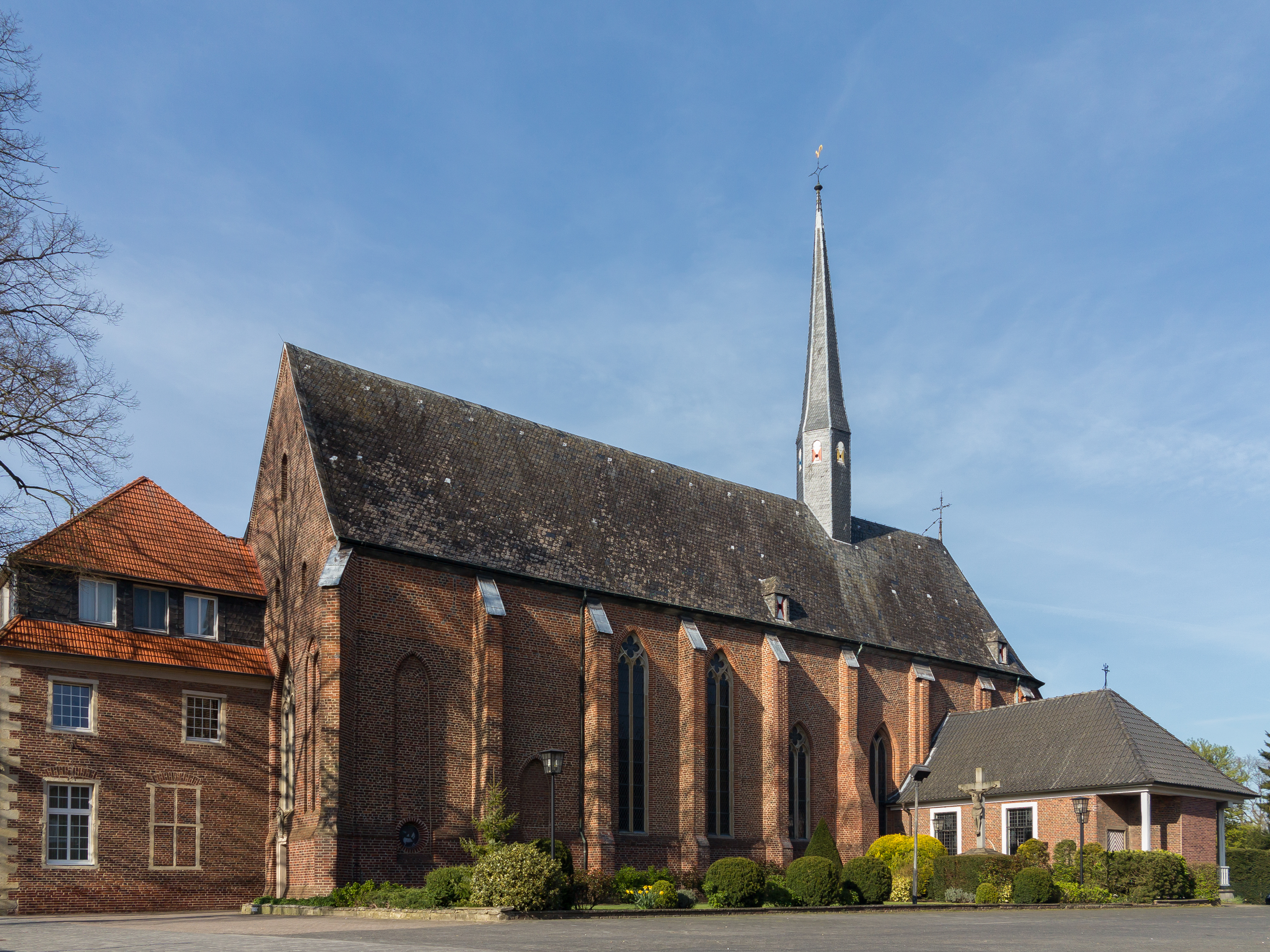
Mariengarden Monastery in Burlo

== See also ==
- Femeiche
