= Adolf Ernst of Limburg Stirum =

Adolf Ernst of Limburg Stirum (1622 – 3 October 1657) was a noble in what is now Germany. He was the count of Limburg Stirum and the son of Hermann Otto I of Limburg-Styrum. Adolf Ernst inherited the lordship of Gemen at the death of his father in 1644, creating the Limburg-Styrum-Gemen branch of the family. He remained lord of Gemen until his death in 1657.

He married in 1644 (Maria) Isabella countess von Vehlen und Meggen zu Raesfeld. She became regent of Gemen when Adolf Ernst was killed, until it passed to her eldest son in 1675. She died in 1692.

They had eight children:

- Hermann Otto, count of Limburg Stirum and Bronckhorst, Lord zu Gemen (killed in 1704);
- Gottfried Ferdinand of Limburg Stirum, who died in 1677;
- Maximilian Wilhelm of Limburg Stirum, died in 1728;
- Alexandrine, died in 1721;
- Charlotte (born 1651, died 1699) who married in 1692 count Christoph Dietmar von Schallenberg (died 1708);
- Wilhelmine (died 1722), married in 1677 count Karl Ludwig von Sinzendorf (died 1722);
- Anna (died 1723) married twice. First in 1678 count Ernst Wilhelm von Bentheim (who died in 1693), then in 1701 count Johann Oxenstierna af Croneborg (died 1733); and
- Adolfa Ernestine (died 1688) married in 1686 count Ferdinand Josef von Reinstein-Tattenbach (died 1712).
