= Friedrich Karl of Limburg Stirum =

Friedrich Karl of Limburg Stirum (10 January 1710 – 31 December 1771) was Count of Limburg Styrum and Bronckhorst, and Sovereign Lord of Gemen.

== Early life ==
Friedrich Karl was born in 1710. He was the eldest son of Otto Leopold of Limburg Stirum and Amalia Anna Elisabeth von Schönborn (1686–1757). His younger brother, August Philipp Karl, became Prince-Bishop of Speyer.

His father was the eldest child and the only son of Count Hermann Otto II von Limburg-Stirum-Bronckhorst and Countess Charlotte Amalie von Vehlen und Meggen. His maternal grandparents were Count Melchior Friedrich von Schönborn-Buchheim and the former Baroness Maria Anna Sophia Johanna von Boyneburg-Lengsfeld (a daughter of Johann Christian von Boyneburg). Among his very large maternal family were uncles Johann Philipp Franz von Schönborn (the Prince-Bishop of Würzburg), Friedrich Karl von Schönborn-Buchheim (the Prince-Bishop of Würzburg and Bamberg who served as Vice-Chancellor of the Holy Roman Empire), Damian Hugo Philipp von Schönborn-Buchheim (the Prince-Bishop of Speyer and Bishop of Konstanz), Rudolf Franz Erwein von Schönborn (the diplomat and composer), Anselm Franz von Schönborn-Heusenstamm, and Franz Georg von Schönborn (the Elector and Archbishop of Trier who was also Prince-Bishop of Worms and Prince-Provost of Ellwangen)

== Career ==
Following the death of his father in 1743, he became Sovereign Lord of Gemen, serving until his death in 1771.

== Personal life ==
He died on 31 December 1771 without descendants and the rule of Gemen passed to his brother.
