= Agnes Salm-Salm =

American memoirist and socialite (1844-1912)

Princess Agnes of Salm-Salm
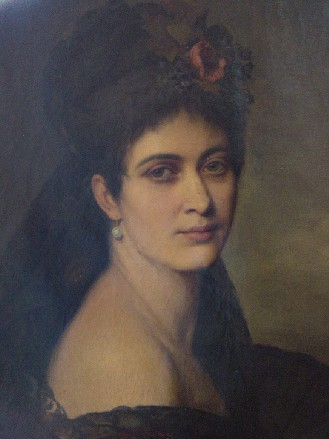
- Agnes Elizabeth of Salm-Salm
- Born: Agnes Elisabeth Winona Leclerc Joy; December 25, 1844; Franklin, Vermont
- Died: December 21, 1912 (aged 67) Karlsruhe, Grand Duchy of Baden
- Buried: Alter Friedhof, Bonn 50.7358°N 7.0903°E
- Allegiance: United States of America
- Rank: Captain (US)
- Conflicts: American Civil War; French intervention in Mexico; Franco-Prussian War
- Awards: Cross of Merit for Women and Girls (1872)
- Spouse: Prince Felix Salm-Salm
- Other work: Red Cross

Princess Agnes of Salm-Salm (née Agnes Elisabeth Winona Leclerc Joy; December 25, 1844 – December 21, 1912) was an American memoirist and socialite. She authored a book of memoirs titled Ten Years of My Life. She was married to Prince Felix zu Salm-Salm, a Prussian mercenary beside whom she played a role in the American Civil War, the Mexican Civil War between President Benito Juárez and the Austrian archduke Maximilian I of Mexico, and the Franco-Prussian War.

== Family and childhood ==
She was born in Franklin, Vermont, the daughter of American general William Leclerc Joy (1793–c. 1886) and his second wife, Julia Willard (died 1882). She was described as red-haired, strong willed, small, and dainty.

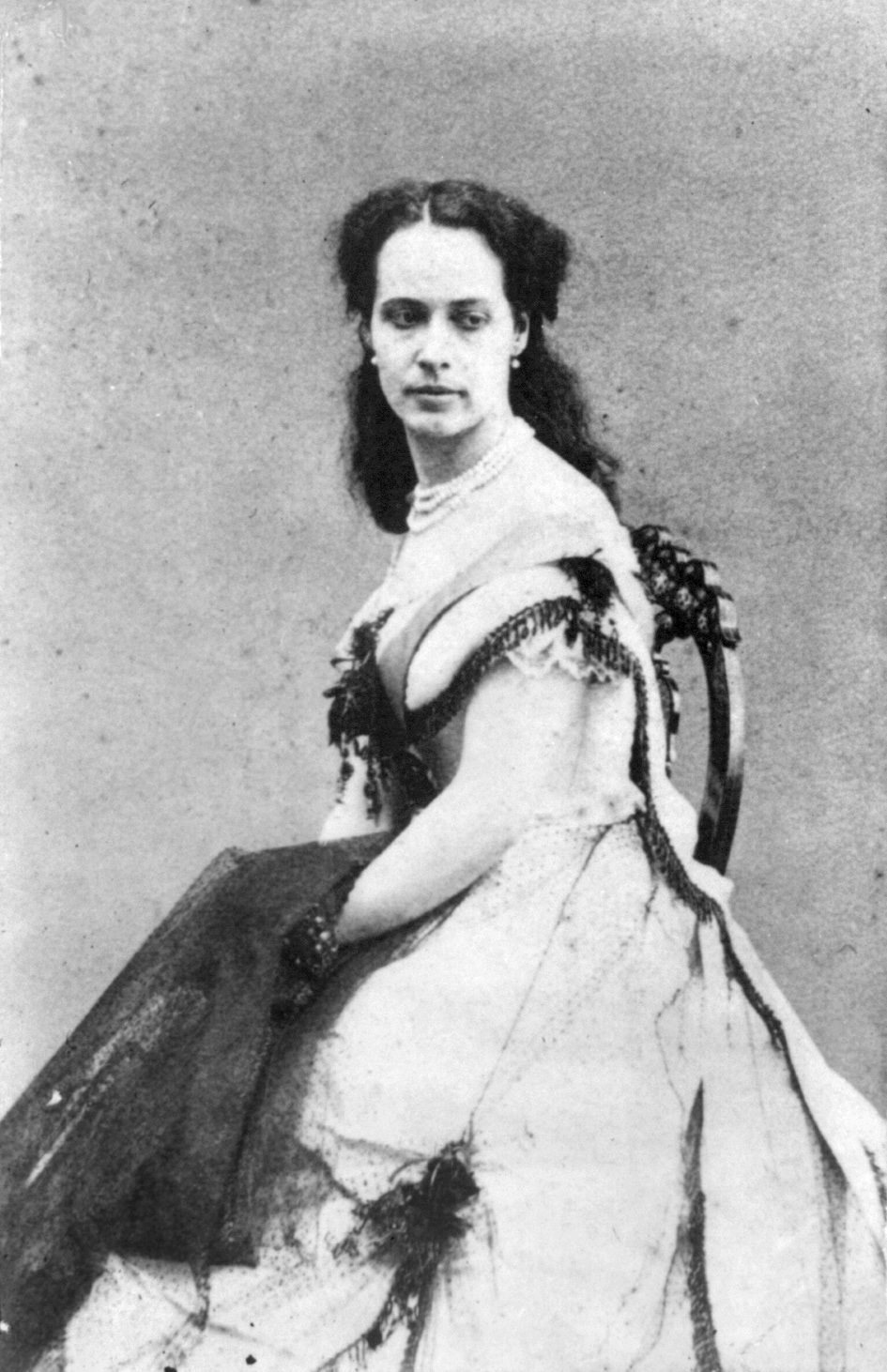
Agnes Elizabeth, Princess of Salm Salm, during the Civil War

Little is known of the early life of Agnes Salm-Salm. Many scholars believe that she worked in a circus, then as an actress in Cuba. In 1861 she returned to the United States but soon left her home in Vermont to visit her sister in Washington, D.C. who was getting married. Agnes stayed around Washington when she met Prince Felix Salm-Salm, a soldier of fortune who was the youngest son of Florentin, 4th Prince of Salm-Salm, and a distant relation to the Emperor Franz Joseph of Austria-Hungary.

She had been riding her horse one morning through the city when Felix first saw her and he made sure she was invited to a party that he would be attending. Soon Felix proposed to her and they were married on August 30, 1862, despite opposition from her family (he was Catholic and she was Protestant).

== American Civil War ==
Prince Felix had a post as adjutant of Louis Blenker in the Army of the Potomac, and soon proceeded to the front. Agnes could not be apart from Felix for too long and eventually followed him to the battlefield. At his camp she would care for the sick and wounded soldiers although she had no previous knowledge of medicine.

For four years she traveled with the troops through war-torn Virginia. As the wife of a colonel she had access to supply wagons and luggage meant for the officers and would often steal supplies in order to care for the soldiers. This sparked a controversy that President Abraham Lincoln eventually settled; the President also pinned a captain's star on her at the time. In January 1863 the troops were ordered to go to Aquia Creek, Virginia, and of course Agnes followed her husband. Here she made a bet that she would give President Lincoln three kisses within the next few days on his visit to the camp, and she succeeded in doing so. (Note: This apparently caused some marital discord between the Lincolns, however; Mary Todd Lincoln, a jealous woman, did not like the idea of her husband being kissed on both cheeks and the lips by a young woman. According to his aides, they were heard arguing about it later in the evening, although Mrs. Lincoln eventually forgave him. See A Kiss from a Princess Sources: Chancellorsville by John Bigelow, Jr.; The Lincolns by Daniel Mark Epstein; Ten Years of My Life by Agnes Elizabeth W. Salm-Salm; Soldier Princess: The Life & Legend of Agnes Salm-Salm in North America by David Coffey; A Biographical Memorial of General Daniel Butterfield, edited by Mrs. Julia Lorrilard Safford Butterfield. Washington in Lincoln's Time, by Noah Brooks. Chancellorsville by Stephen W. Sears.)

== Mexico ==
After the American Civil War was over, Salm-Salm offered his services to the Habsburg's Emperor Maximilian I of Mexico, and both Agnes and he embarked for Mexico in February, 1866. When they arrived in Mexico City, the French troops under François Achille Bazaine were leaving, as mounting diplomatic pressure from the United States persuaded Napoleon III to conclude his Mexican venture. Hence, the couple knowingly embarked on a risky enterprise, joining the weakened and unpopular imperial army.

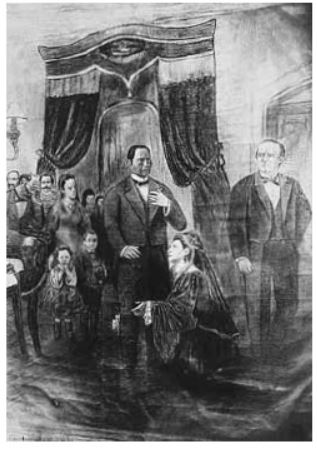
Ocaranza's painting of Agnes Salm-Salm plea for the life of Maximilian

In early February 1867 the Republican troops supporting the regime of President Benito Juárez forced Maximilian to retreat to the city of Querétaro and subsequently besieged the city. Simultaneously, the imperial reinforcements that were expected to break the siege were themselves being besieged in Puebla by the republican troops commanded by General Porfirio Díaz and Maximilian was forced to surrender. Despite last minute efforts by Felix Salm-Salm and a company of Hussars to rescue him, Maximilian was made prisoner on May 15 and a court martial sentenced him to death. Agnes made great efforts to spare the life of Maximilian and her husband, traveling several times from Querétaro to Mexico City and San Luis Potosí where she held interviews with President Benito Juárez, General Mariano Escobedo, General Porfirio Díaz and several other prominent officers of the Republican Army.

Agnes knelt and, crying, begged President Juárez to forgive the Emperor. The President's answer has become famous in Mexican history textbooks: "It causes me great pain, Madame, to see you like that on your knees; but even if every king and queen were in your place, I couldn't spare his life. It isn't me who takes it from him, it is the people and the law who claim his life". Juárez had already received telegraphs from most of the heads of the European states asking him to spare Maximilan. Upon Juárez's denial the brave woman answered, "Oh, if blood must be spilled, then take my life, the life of a useless woman; and spare that of a man who can still do much good in other country." Juarez did offer to spare the life of her husband. The scene was painted by the Mexican painter Manuel Ocaranza.

Subsequently, she planned an escape for the Emperor and her husband. The plan was to get Colonel Villanueva to escort the Emperor to Veracruz, but Villanueva would not go through with it without the cooperation of Colonel Palacios. A bribe was in order. Agnes had offered two promissory notes for 100,000 pesos to each of them which would be honored by Maximilian's brother, Franz Joseph. While they were in her parlor Agnes revealed the plan to Palacios, who had told her earlier that he sympathized with the Emperor. Palacios was skeptical and said he would give her his answer in the morning. Agnes agreed, believing he would go through with it, but the escape plan fell through and Maximilian was executed 19 June 1867 in Santiago de Querétaro . Felix Salm-Salm was released from custody in December 1867 and soon after, he returned to Europe, where Agnes joined him, and re-entered the Prussian Army.

== Franco-Prussian War ==
When Felix went to Europe to fight again in the Prussian Army, Agnes soon joined him via New York. In 1868 they arrived in Berlin. Because of their attempts to free Maximilian, the prince was again accepted at court along with his wife. In Europe she was the star of all the social circles in the capital as well as in Karlsruhe where she lived. During the war she continued to travel along with her husband and served among the medical staff. She was awarded the Cross of Merit for Women and Girls for army relief work.

== Later years ==
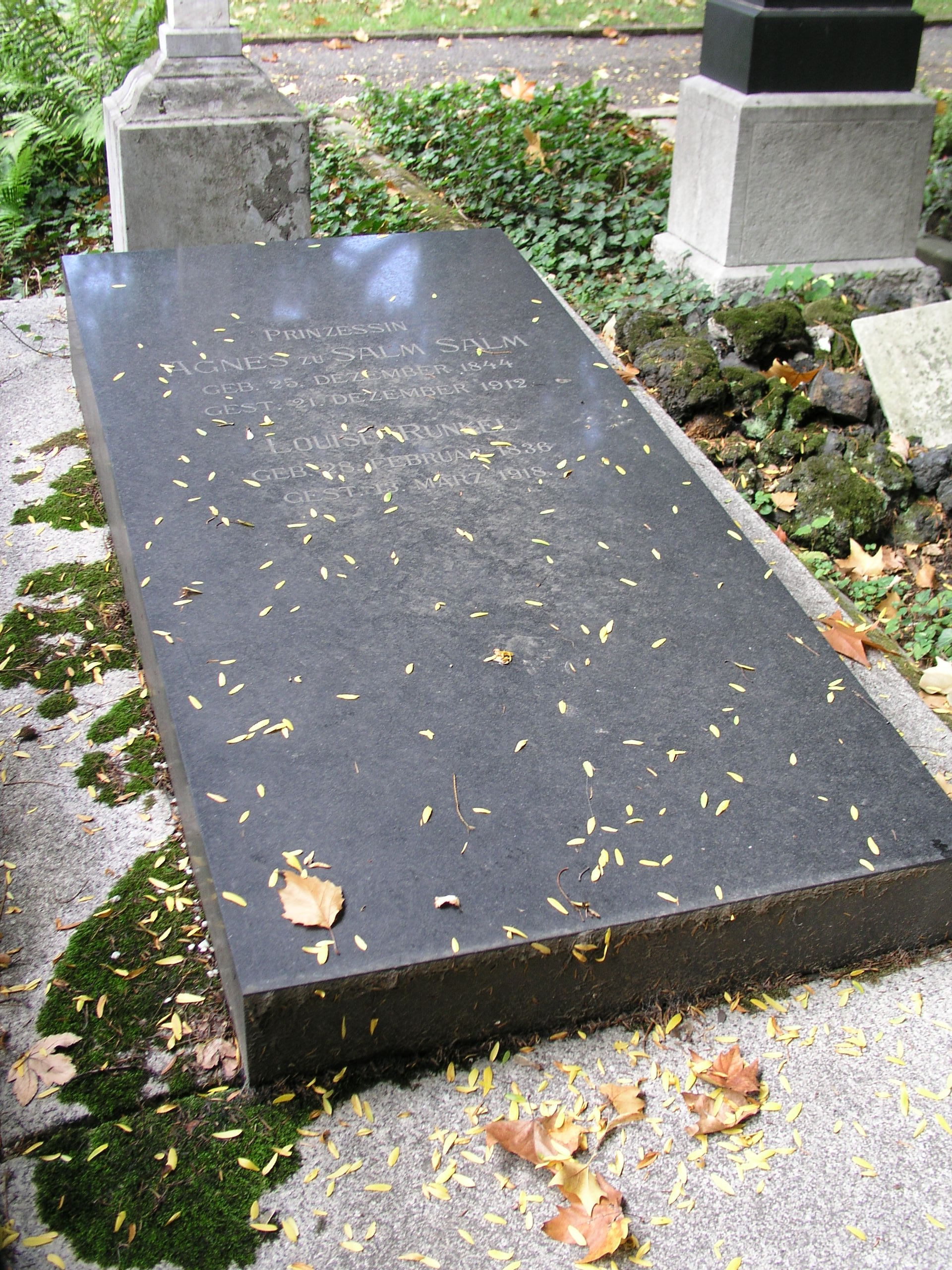
Grave marker of the Princess, in the Old cemetery in Bonn

On August 18, 1870, Felix Salm-Salm was killed in combat at Saint-Privat-la-Montagne during the Battle of Gravelotte. Afterward, his widow remained an active seeker for justice in the world, collecting funds for military hospitals.

She lived for several years in Switzerland and Italy, part of the time with her friends, the Baron and Baroness von Stein. In 1876 she remarried the British diplomat, Charles Heneage, but this marriage was dissolved. She returned briefly to the United States in 1899, but later settled in southern Germany. She wrote a book of memories titled Ten Years of My Life (2 vols. London: Richard Bentley and Son, 1876). She died in her apartment in Karlsruhe, Germany, on December 21, 1912. She was buried in the Alter Friedhof, Bonn.
