= Leopold, Count of Limburg Stirum (born 1681) =

Leopold Johann Otto Wilhelm of Limburg Stirum (December 27, 1681 – February 11, 1726), was count of Limburg Styrum from the branch Limburg-Styrum-Iller-Aichheim.

He was the first son of Maximilian Wilhelm of Limburg Stirum. In 1712, he married countess Barbara Draskovich de Trakostjan (June 27, 1687 – died before 1734). The couple had two children:

- Maximilian Anton (born in 1713, probably died in 1726),
- Amalia Wilhelmine (born in 1714, died before 1755).

He died before his father and the sovereignty of Simontornya went over to his younger brother Karl Joseph Alois.

== Sources ==
- De takken Gemen en Styrum van het geslacht van Limburg Stirum; Dr. A.J. Bonke; Stichting van Limburg Stirum; The Hague, 2007
- Iconografie van het Geslacht van Limburg Stirum; C.J. Graaf van Limburg Stirum; Walburg Instituut, Amsterdam, 1994
- A. Giraud, M. Huberty, F. et B. Magdelaine, "L'Allemagne Dynastique, Tome VII"
