= Limburg-Styrum-Iller-Aichheim =

Limburg-Styrum-Iller-Aichheim
1657 – 1800
'Capital; Circle; Bench	Iller-Aichheim; Lower Rhenish-West. Counts of Westphalia
Partitioned from Limburg-Styrum-Gemen	1657
Inherited Gemen	1782
Extinct; to Boyneburg-Bömelberg	1800

Limburg-Styrum-Iller-Aichheim was a County of medieval Germany, based in the Lordship of Iller-Aichheim. It was partitioned from Limburg-Styrum-Gemen in 1657. When the line of Limburg-Styrum-Gemen became extinct in 1782 the Counts of Limburg-Styrum-Iller-Aichheim inherited it and the Imperial Estate of Gemen. However, when in 1800 this line became extinct, it was inherited by Boyneburg-Bömelberg instead of Limburg-Styrum-Styrum.

== Counts of Limburg-Styrum-Iller-Aichheim (1657–1800) ==
Name	Reign
Maximilian William	1657–1724
Leopold	1724–1726
Charles Alois Joseph	1726–1739
Charles Joseph Maximilian	1739–1798
Ferdinand Gotthard Meinrad	1798–1800
