= Leopold of Limburg Stirum =

Several members of the mediatized House of Limburg-Stirum had the name Leopold.

Amongst them:

- Leopold of Limburg Stirum (1681–1726), from the branch Limburg-Styrum-Gemen.
- Leopold van Limburg Stirum (1758–1840), he played a prominent role in the re-establishment of the monarchy in the Netherlands in 1813.
