= Femeiche =

Oak tree in North Rhine-Westphalia

Coordinates: 51°44′43.7″N 6°51′43.4″E

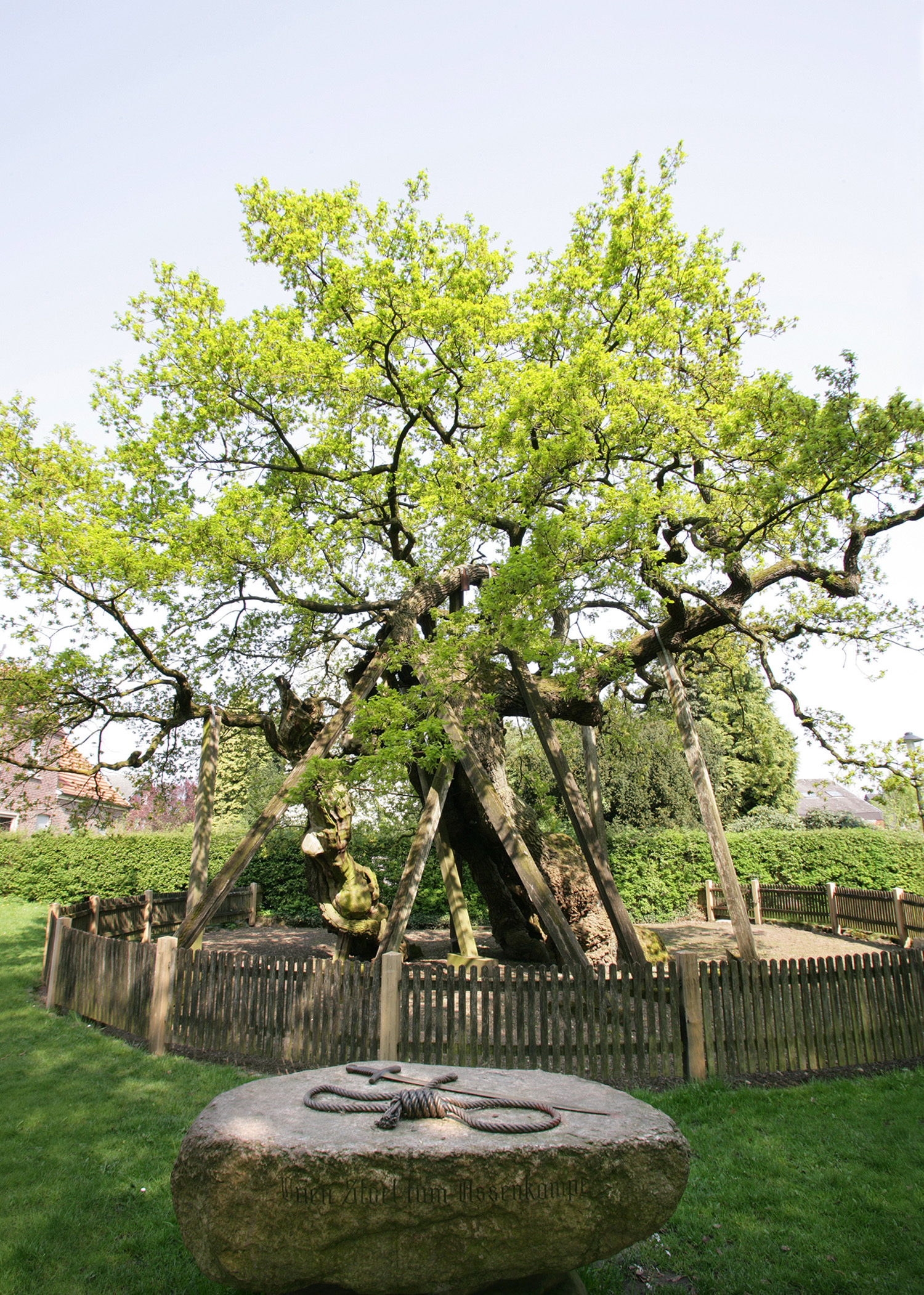
Femeiche in Erle

The Femeiche, formerly known as Rabenseiche, Ravenseiche, or Erler Eiche, located in Erle within the North Rhine-Westphalian district of Borken, is one of Germany's oldest oaks, estimated to be between 600 and 850 years old. This English oak (Quercus robur) stands near the parish church.

Feme courts were held beneath this oak until the 16th century, making it the oldest and most renowned court tree in Central Europe. For more than a century, this oak tree has been designated a natural monument due to its age, lightning strikes, storms, and human impact. The trunk has been hollow for about 250 years and consists only of sapwood. The trunk shell, supported by poles, encompasses a hollow space with an almost three-meter diameter.

== Location ==
The village of Erle is situated on the edge of the Westmünsterland, at the crossroads of the Franconian Rhineland and the Saxon Hamaland, in a typical heathland landscape within the Hohe Mark-Westmünsterland Nature Park, three kilometers southeast of Raesfeld on the B 224 highway. This oak tree stands on the southwestern outskirts of the village, adjacent to a new development area, and is situated next to Erle's oldest house, the historic pastorate. The oak tree's elevation is approximately 60 meters above sea level.

== Description ==
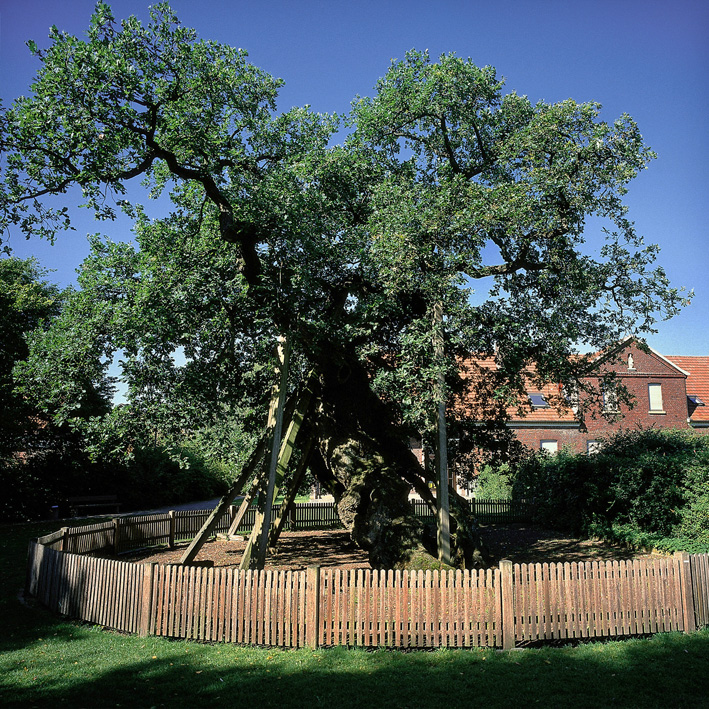
Femeiche with wooden supports

The trunk of the oak has been extensively hollowed out and is mostly destroyed, with only three trunk sections still intact and joining at a height of approximately four meters. Notably, the oak exhibits a strong southwest-leaning inclination, against the primary wind direction. Due to the sloping growth, the sap flow paths on the slanting side were constricted at the base of the trunk, resulting in approximately one-third of the circumference of the trunk dying. In 1965, during renovations, the dead trunk sections were removed. Currently, the trunk comprises only the outer sections of the sapwood, including the cambium, bast, and bark, some of which are curled inward. The heartwood has disappeared. The tree's former large branches exist only as remnants, as they broke off many centuries ago due to storms and lightning strikes. Over time, more branches have detached from the increasingly deteriorating supporting trunk.

The remaining trunk now forms a secondary crown, supported by several wooden poles, some resting on stone slabs, preventing the tree from falling. This lower-set, unilaterally spreading secondary crown consists of multiple branching branches. It is well-leafy in summer and has a rich flower and fruit set. As of 2005, the tree stood at a height of eleven meters with a crown diameter of eight meters.

=== Trunk girth ===
In 1989, the oak's trunk circumference, measured at a height of one meter, reached twelve meters. According to the Deutschen Baumarchiv (German Tree Archive), which considers the trunk circumference at one meter as the primary selection criterion, these measurements categorize the oak as exceeding the lower threshold for National Bedeutsamen Bäume (NBB) (Nationally significant trees). If the trunk were fully preserved, it would have a circumference of approximately 14 meters, making it the thickest oak in Germany. Historically, the strongest oak in Germany was the Dagobertseiche in Dagobertshausen, Hesse, with a trunk circumference of 14.86 meters at a height of one meter in 1851; however, the last remnants of this tree disappeared around 1900.

Reports from 1892 indicated a trunk diameter at breast height of about 4.5 meters, and in 1902, the trunk's circumference at man-height was recorded at 12.5 meters. By 1927, the circumference had expanded to 14 meters.

=== Age ===
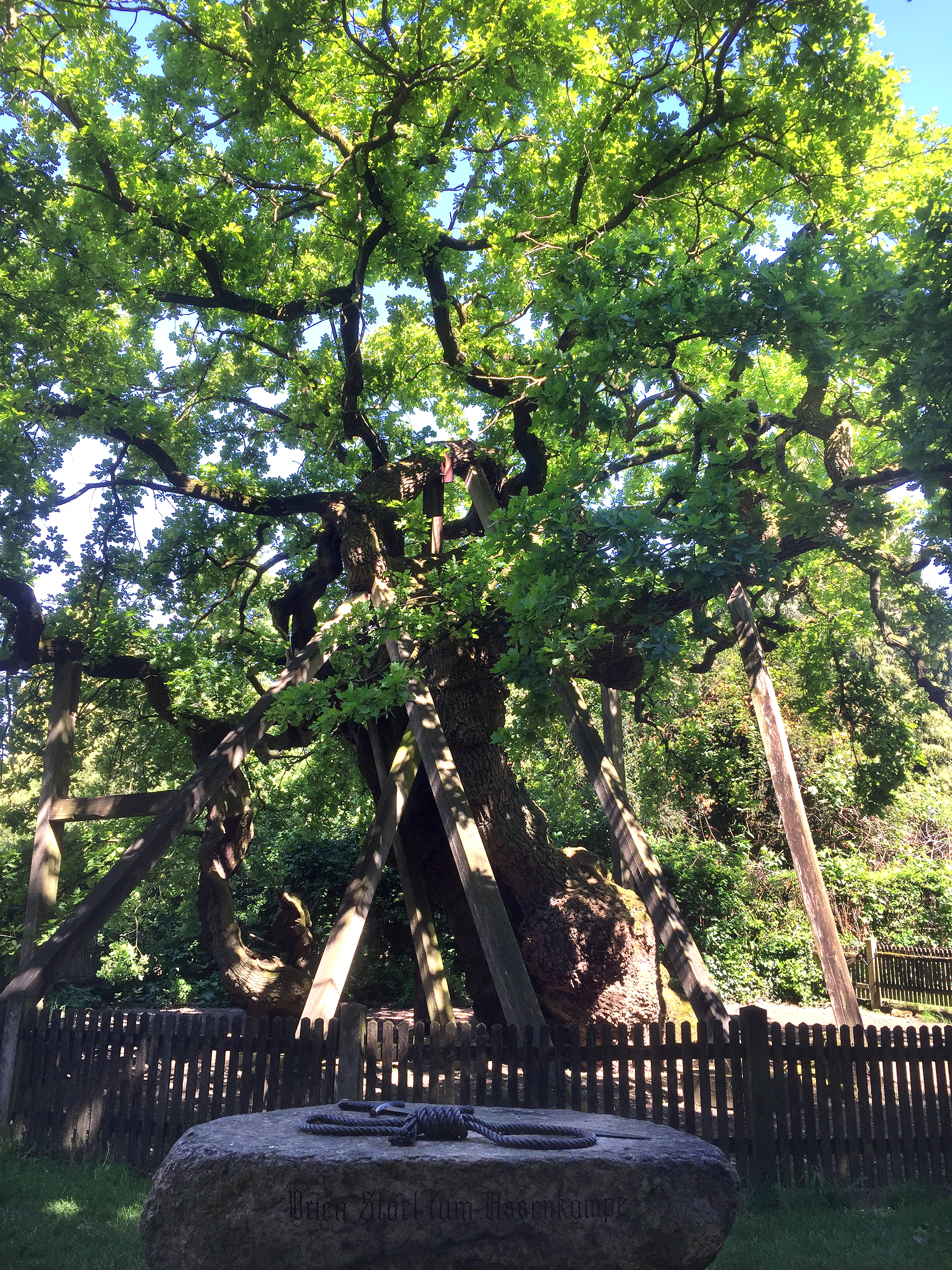
Natural monument “Erler Femeiche”. 1000-year-old oak tree in Erle, a district of the municipality of Raesfeld in Münsterland. The community of Raesfeld is located in the Hohe Mark nature park.

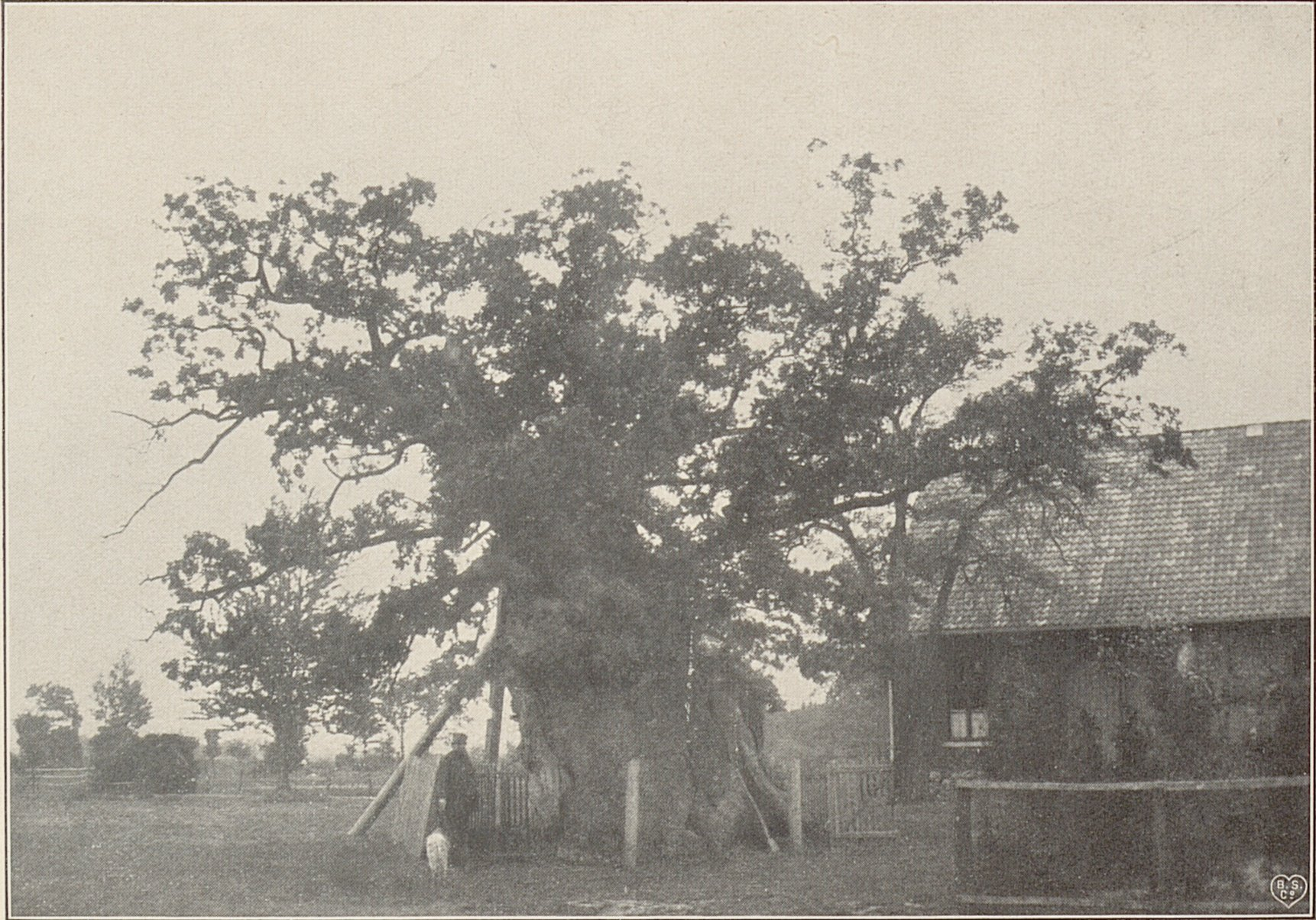
Femeiche near alder around 1900

The age of the oak tree presents a wide range of estimates. Due to the absence of the oldest wood from the center of the trunk, traditional methods like annual ring counting and radiocarbon dating cannot be applied. Therefore, the oak's age can only be roughly estimated based on trunk circumference and historical records.

Recent findings suggest that the oak is likely between 600 and 850 years old, potentially making it the oldest oak in Germany. In 2008, the Deutsche Baumarchiv (German Tree Archive) provided an age estimate of 600 to 850 years. This estimate is derived from research on the annual increment in the circumference of old oaks, approximately 1.8 centimeters, based on the reconstructed trunk circumference of the oak, which measures 14 meters. In the region, annual ring counts of oaks up to 450 years old showed yearly circumference increases of 1.5 to 1.7 centimeters. Based on these values, the oak could be about 800 to 900 years old.

Other estimates of age range from 1000, 1300 to 1500 years. These estimates are mainly based on historical tradition. One reason for the oak's great age could be that it was the first in the region to unfurl its leaves. The oak moth, a foliage pest, has not been able to harm it so far, as it only develops after the other oaks have sprouted.

== Natural monument ==
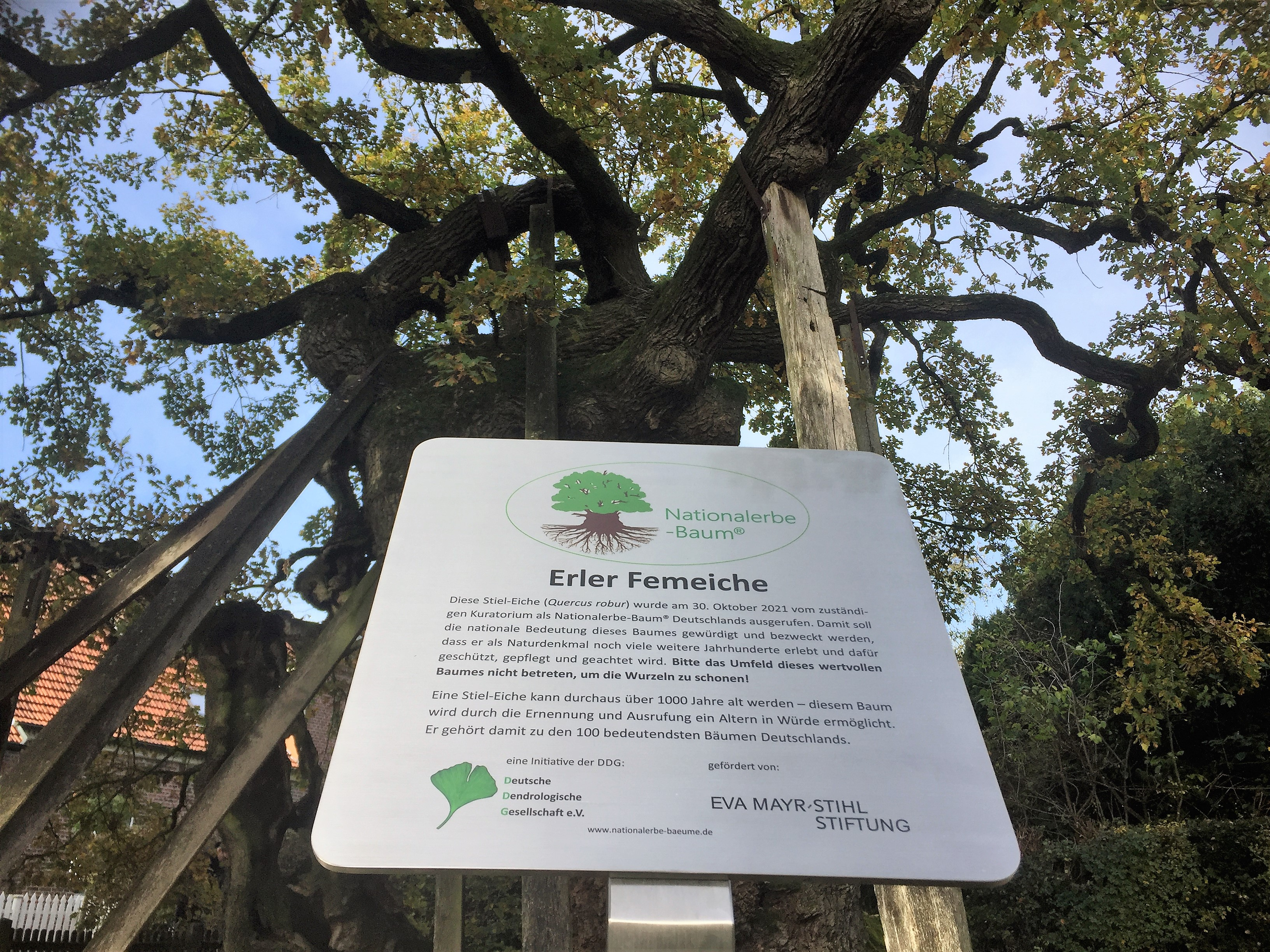
Information board about the proclamation as a national heritage tree

The Femeiche, designated as I.J. 1, received the status of a natural monument on July 1, 1996. It is listed by the Unteren Landschaftsbehörde (ULB) (Lower Landscape Authority) based on an ordinance from the district of Borken, which is responsible for its protection and maintenance. As a natural monument, structural installations, excavations, and fills in its vicinity are strictly prohibited, providing the oak with the highest level of protection. The tree became part of the district of Borken in 1975 due to municipal reorganization, having previously been under the jurisdiction of the Dorsten office in the Recklinghausen district, where it was first listed as a natural monument on April 12, 1954. The oak had already received protection around 1900.

In October 2021, the Board of Trustees for National Heritage Trees of the German Dendrological Society declared the Erler Femeiche as the twelfth National Heritage Tree. This designation marks the oak as the first National Heritage Tree in the Westmünsterland region and in North Rhine-Westphalia.

Additionally, another tree, the Pius oak, planted on June 16, 1871, has been registered as a natural monument in Erle since 1996.

== History ==
The old name Ravenseiche and the name of the area, Aßenkamp, suggest a connection to Germanic mythology. The raven is a symbol associated with the Germanic god of the dead and war, Odin, and the Aces were Germanic deities. Landscape architect Anette Lenzing, in her book Gerichtslinden und Thingplätze in Deutschland (Court Lime Trees and Thing Places in Germany), has suggested that the Femeiche may have been used as a court site (Thing) in Germanic times. However, it remains uncertain whether the current Femeiche or a predecessor oak stood in the same spot during that time. According to one legend, the god Odin himself served as a judge under the oak, with his two ravens, Hugin and Munin, perched on the branches of the tree.

=== Feme Courts ===
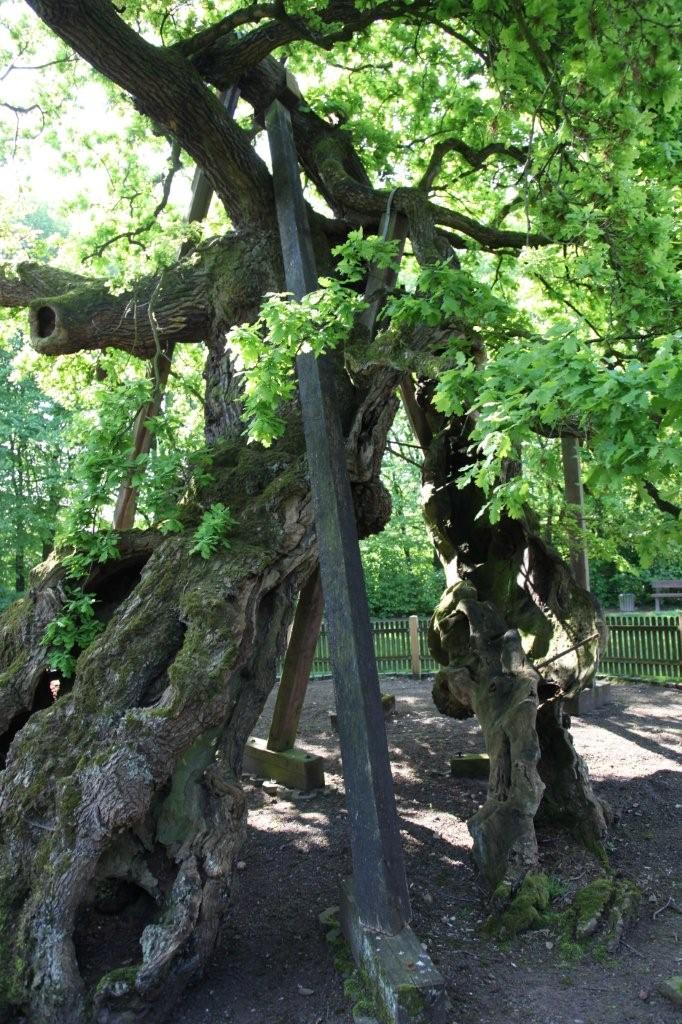
Root view

The Freistuhl, also known as the Erler Femgericht, met under the oak tree called "den vryen Stoel tum Aßenkampe" during the late Middle Ages when it held its greatest authority. At this Freistuhl, which was a large stone slab, the free counts, along with six assessors, conducted trials based on Emperor Charlemagne's laws for serious crimes like murder, robbery, arson, and perjury. Until 1335, the court was under the control of the lord of the see of Heiden and had jurisdiction over the parishes of Erle, Raesfeld, Alt-Schermbeck, and the Dorsten districts of Rhade and Holsterhausen north of Lippe.

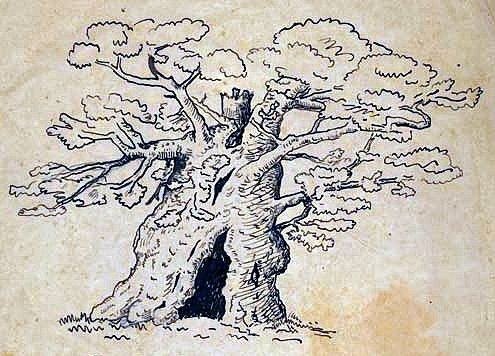
Drawing of the feme oak near Erle

In 1442, the power of the Feme courts was severely restricted by the Imperial Diet, so they lost importance. Feme court was held under the oak tree until 1589. In the 16th century, the Feme court had to relinquish a large part of its jurisdiction with the strengthening of the sovereignty of the Prince-Bishop of Münster and was dissolved at the end of the 18th century. The stone slab of the free chair was erected as a monument at the bridge near Dorsten; in 1945, British soldiers threw it into the river.

=== Historical lore ===
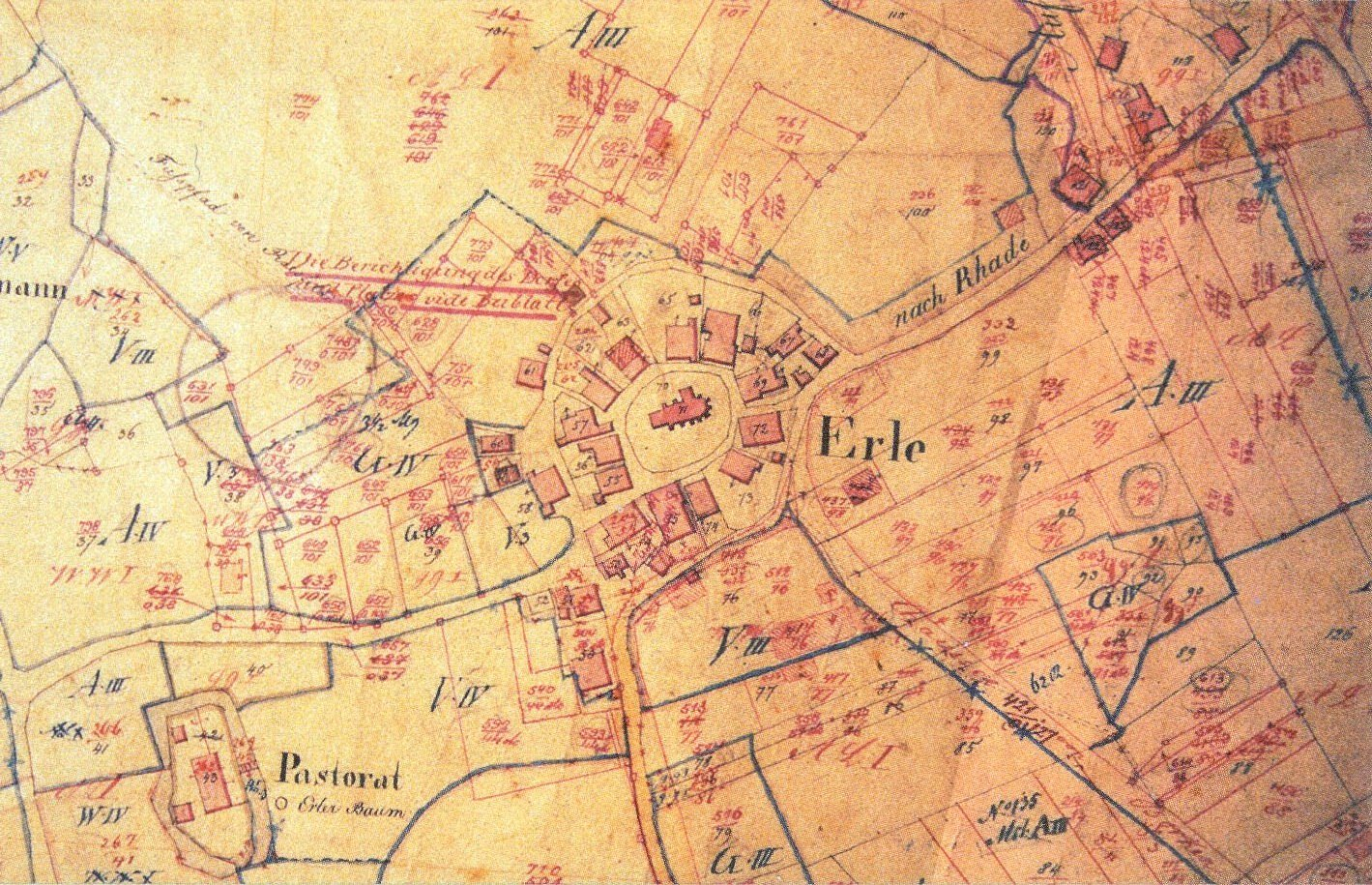
Alder map

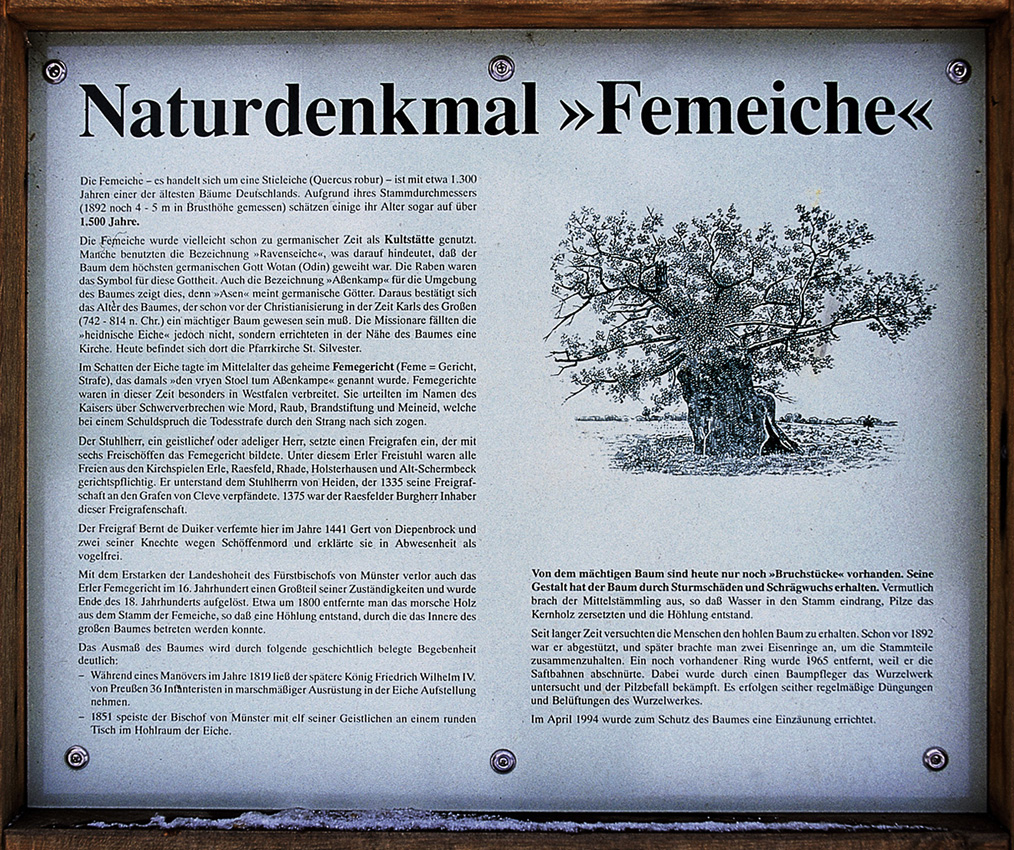
Femeiche in alder, information board

The main crown of the oak likely broke out in the 17th century, and over the centuries, the present crown gradually formed. The absence of the central trunk allowed water to penetrate the tree, leading to wood decay and the formation of a cavity. Around the year 1750, after the tree had been attacked by fungus, Pastor de Weldige took action to ensure its survival. He treated the diseased tree with sharp tools, scraped out the rotten middle section, and created a narrow, man-high entrance.

=== Safeguarding measures ===
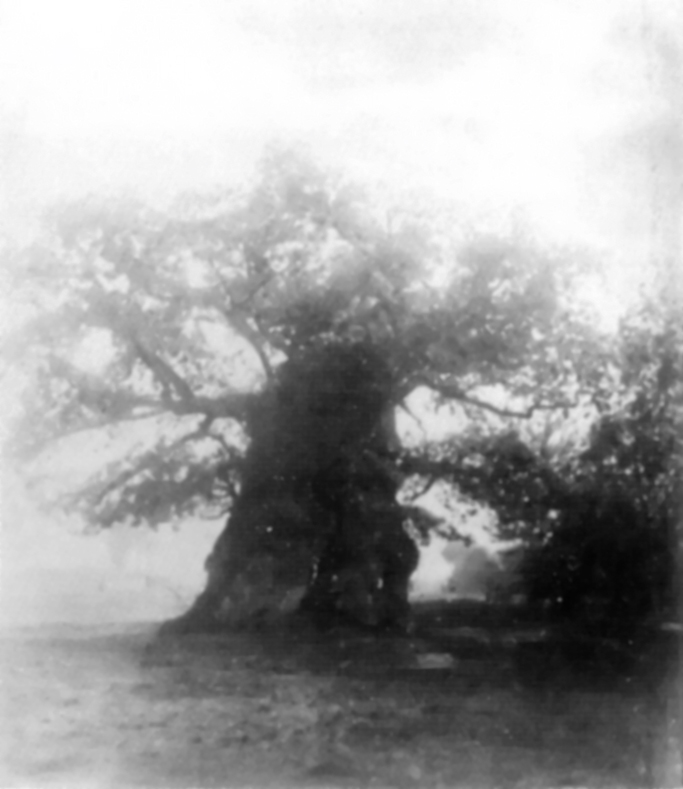
Femeiche in 1890

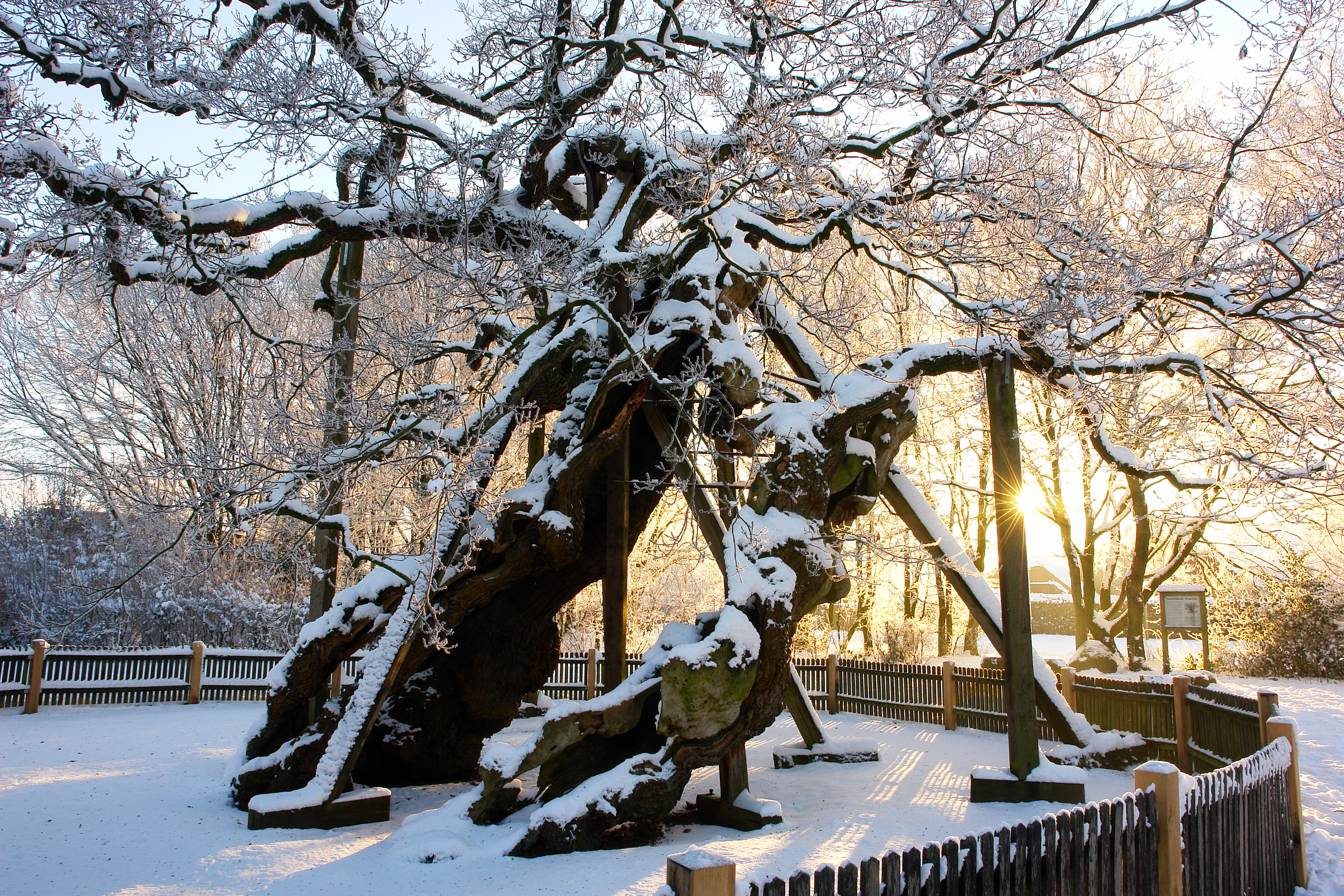
Femeiche in winter

In 1892, the oak tree received several support beams to prevent it from falling over. The trunk sections were additionally held together by two iron rings. The work was carried out by von Buerbaum, a garden architect in Düsseldorf, along with the forester Joly. Whether supporting beams were present before 1892 is not known. In 1927, the top of the tree broke, reducing its height, which had previously been 18 meters.

=== Redevelopment ===
Before the extensive renovation by arborist Michael Maurer in 1965, he provided a report on the condition of the oak tree. His observations were documented in the local history calendar of the Herrlichkeit Lembeck.

The renovation aimed to ensure that the annual growth on the outside of the tree exceeded the wood loss on the inside, preventing the trunk shells from becoming thinner. The iron ring that had grown into the tree, hindering sap flow, was removed. The arborists cut into the cell layer of the bark to promote sap flow and removed rotten and fungus-infested wood. They indexed the remaining wood, smoothed it, and treated it with fungicide. Three fragments remained, uniting at a height of four meters. The upper part of the tree with scrawny wood was removed, and the cut surfaces were covered with lacquer balsam. The wooden supports from 1892 were replaced by six new ones to protect the secondary crown. Threaded rods with overtubes were added to connect the trunk sections, and the barkless wood was given a water-repellent coating.

The trampled soil around the oak was excavated to a depth of 40cm and replaced with new soil, humus, and tree feed, a special fertilizer with a long-term effect. A layer of gravel was placed on top to aid with soil aeration and irrigation. To alleviate soil compaction, drilling was done down to the alluvial gravel four meters deep. Stepping on the root zone was prohibited to prevent soil compaction. The district of Recklinghausen incurred remediation costs of approximately 20,000 German marks.

=== Further measures ===
A fence that had been installed for protection at the beginning of the 20th century was removed during the renovation in 1965. In 1986 and 1987, the trunk received further treatment, including the replacement of gravel with water-storing lava granules. Since April 1994, a new fence has been in place to protect the tree, preventing climbing attempts and damage to the branches and twigs. During a storm in May 2000, the oak suffered damage, leading to the pruning of the crown and additional support with three new supports. To commemorate the historical feme courts held under the oak, a granite sculpture was erected outside the fence in the summer of 2006, representing a court table with a hangman's rope and a sword. In 2008, further maintenance efforts were planned to bring the crown up to the trunk's carrying capacity.

== Audiobook ==
Since 2009, there has been an interactive audiobook entitled Die Femeiche from the genre of mystery thriller, which is about the community of Erle and the Femeiche but has nothing to do with the real history of the Femeiche and the village.
