= Karl Josef of Limburg Stirum =

Karl Josef Maximilian of Limburg Stirum (died 1798), was Count of Limburg Styrum, Sovereign Lord of Gemen.

== Early life ==
He was the son of Alois von Limburg Stirum (1685–1739) and Maria Theresia Keglevich (d. 1728). His sister, Maria Amalie von Limburg-Gemen, was the wife of Count Carl Josef Esterházy von Galántha.

His paternal grandparents were Maximilian Wilhelm von Limburg-Gemen and Maria Anna von Rechberg.

== Career ==
He inherited the immediate Sovereign Lordship of Gemen from his uncle, Ferdinand I of Limburg Stirum, in 1791 and remained until his death in 1798. Alois having survived his three sons, Gemen passed to his grandson Ferdinand IV of Limburg Stirum.

== Personal life ==
He married Maria Anna Vogel von Wassenhofen. Together, they had five children:

- Johann Nepomuck von Limburg Stirum (1756–1791), who married Maria Walpurga vom Stain in 1784.
- Joseph von Limburg Stirum (1757–1766), who died young
- Franz von Limburg Stirum (b. 1760)
- Johann Nepomuck von Limburg Stirum (1766–1787)
- Anna Maria von Limburg Stirum (b. 1750)
- Maria Barbara von Limburg Stirum (1762–1769), who died young.

He died in 1798 and was succeeded as Count of Limburg Stirum by his eldest son, Johann.
