= Marvin Grumann =

German footballer

Personal information
- Date of birth: 23 June 1993 (age 33)
- Place of birth: Borken, Germany
- Height: 1.79 m (5 ft 10 in)
- Position: Attacking midfielder

Team information
- Current team: SV Schermbeck
- Number: 23

Youth career
- 1997–2007: SV Schermbeck
- 2007–2011: Schalke 04
- 2012–2013: Rot-Weiß Oberhausen

Senior career*
| Years | Team | Apps | (Gls) |
| 2011–2014 | Rot-Weiß Oberhausen | 8 | (0) |
| 2012–2014 | → Rot-Weiß Oberhausen II | 44 | (5) |
| 2014–2016 | FC Kray | 37 | (3) |
| 2016–2017 | SSVg Velbert | 23 | (0) |
| 2017–2022 | SG Welper | | |
| 2022– | SV Schermbeck | 2 | (0) |
- * Club domestic league appearances and goals as of 13 November 2022

Marvin Grumann (born 23 June 1993) is a German professional footballer who plays as an attacking midfielder for SV Schermbeck.
