= Alois of Limburg Stirum =

German noble

Karl Joseph Alois of Limburg Stirum, count of Limburg Stirum from the branch Limburg-Styrum-Iller-Aichheim, was the son of Maximilian Wilhelm of Limburg Stirum. He was born in 1685 and died in 1738. After his father's death he became sovereign lord of Simontornya.

He married countess Maria Theresia Keglevich (died 1728) in 1722 and their children were:

- Karl Joseph, count of Limburg Stirum, sovereign lord zu Gemen (died 1798);
- Maria Amalie who married in 1748 count Carl Josef Esterhazy, and died in 1776;
- Magdalena, who married count Josef Carl Petazzi;
- Maria Theresa, who married count Gotthard von Denath; and
- Johann, count of Limburg Stirum (born 1726, died 1750).

== Sources ==
- De takken Gemen en Styrum van het geslacht van Limburg Stirum; Dr. A.J. Bonke; Stichting van Limburg Stirum; 's-Gravenhage, 2007
- Iconografie van het Geslacht van Limburg Stirum; C.J. Graaf van Limburg Stirum; Walburg Instituut, Amsterdam, 1994
- A. Giraud, M. Huberty, F. et B. Magdelaine, "L'Allemagne Dynastique, Tome VII"
