= August Philip of Limburg Stirum =

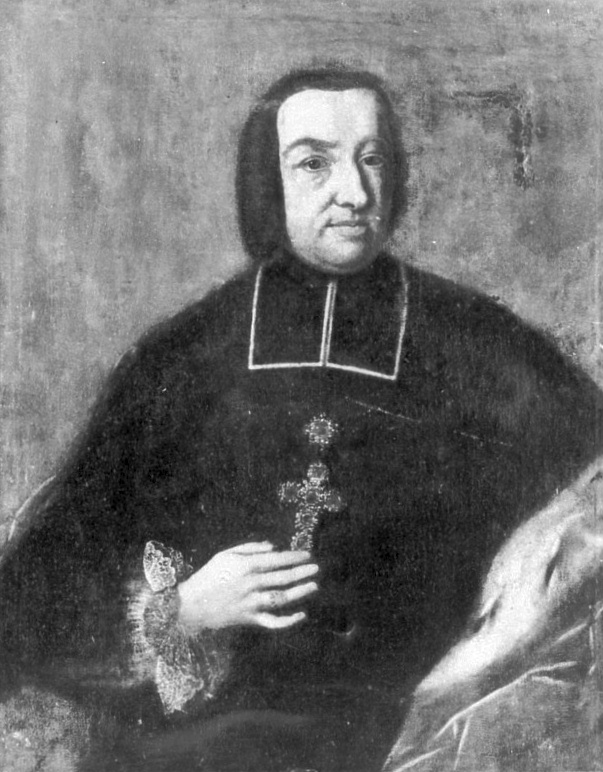
Portrait of Damian August Philip von Limburg Stirum

Damian August Philipp Karl of Limburg Stirum (1721–1797), count of Limburg Stirum and Bronckhorst, was the son of Otto Leopold Count von Limburg Styrum und Bronckhorst, Lord of Gemen and Raesfeld (1688–1754) and Anna Elisabeth countess of Schönborn (1686–1757).

August Philipp was Prince-Bishop of Speyer and sovereign Lord zu Gemen from 1771 until 1797.

== Life ==
At the age of 8 years, on 6 December 1729 Damian August Philipp Karl von Limburg-Stirum pronounced his vows. One year later, on 6 December 1730, he was made Domicellar of Speyer by his uncle prince-bishop Damian Hugo Philipp von Schönborn.

He started his theology studies in Rome in 1742, then continued in Würzburg. On 3 November 1753 he was named Subdeacon of the cathedral of Speyer, and two years later as Deacon. He succeeded Franz Christoph von Huttens as bishop on 25 May 1770.

During his time as bishop, Damian August Philipp Karl von Limburg Stirum added new defensive walls to Bruchsal, as modern cannons made the existing defenses obsolete. The remains from these city walls can still be seen today. He also established a hospital, a school of Latin, and shelters for the poor.

On 1 October 1792, he was forced to flee from the French revolutionary army. He went to Veitshöchheim, Augsburg, and Freising and came back to Bruchsal on 20 April 1793. Three years later, on 21 September 1795, was he again overthrown by the French army. He settled in Freising and later in Passau.

Prince-bishop Damian August Philipp Karl von Limburg-Stirum died in Passau on 22 February 1797 in Freudenhain castle. He was buried in the Cappucine chapel of Freudenhain. The church and the tomb were later destroyed during the revolution. His heart was however brought to Bruchsal on 21 March 1797 and placed in a silver urn in the tomb of the Prince Bishops in St. Peter's church. His successor, the last prince-bishop of Speyer, was Wilderich of Walderdorf until the German Mediatisation in 1806.

The Fürst-Stirum-Klinik and Stirumschule in Bruchsal are named after him.

== Literature ==
- Gustav Banholzer: Die Wirtschaftspolitik des Grafen August v. Limburg-Stirum zweitletzten Fürstbischofs von Speier (1770–1797). Herder, Freiburg im Breisgau 1926.
- Rudolf Schreiber (1953). "August Damian Philipp Karl Graf v. Limburg-Stirum, Fürstbischof von Speyer". Neue Deutsche Biographie (in German). Vol. 1. Berlin: Duncker & Humblot. pp. 450–451.
