= Lenore Von Stein =

Lenore Von Stein is a composer and soprano.

Von Stein began her artistic career as an actor and playwright. She originated the role in Samuel Beckett's monologue The Expelled. Her own play, The Adventures of Mae Witt, was produced in New York in 1987.

Von Stein's CD recordings include: Love Is Dead (1995); Blind Love = Porno? (1996); The Electronic-Acoustic Ensemble (1997); I Haven't Been Able to Lie and Tell the Truth (2002) and Art and Money (2006).

Von Stein currently serves as the artistic director of 1687, Inc., a non-profit organization supporting contemporary abstract expressionists. In 2009, 1687 began producing episodes of Lenore Von Stein's series The Facts for broadcast and web TV.
