= Otto Leopold of Limburg Stirum =

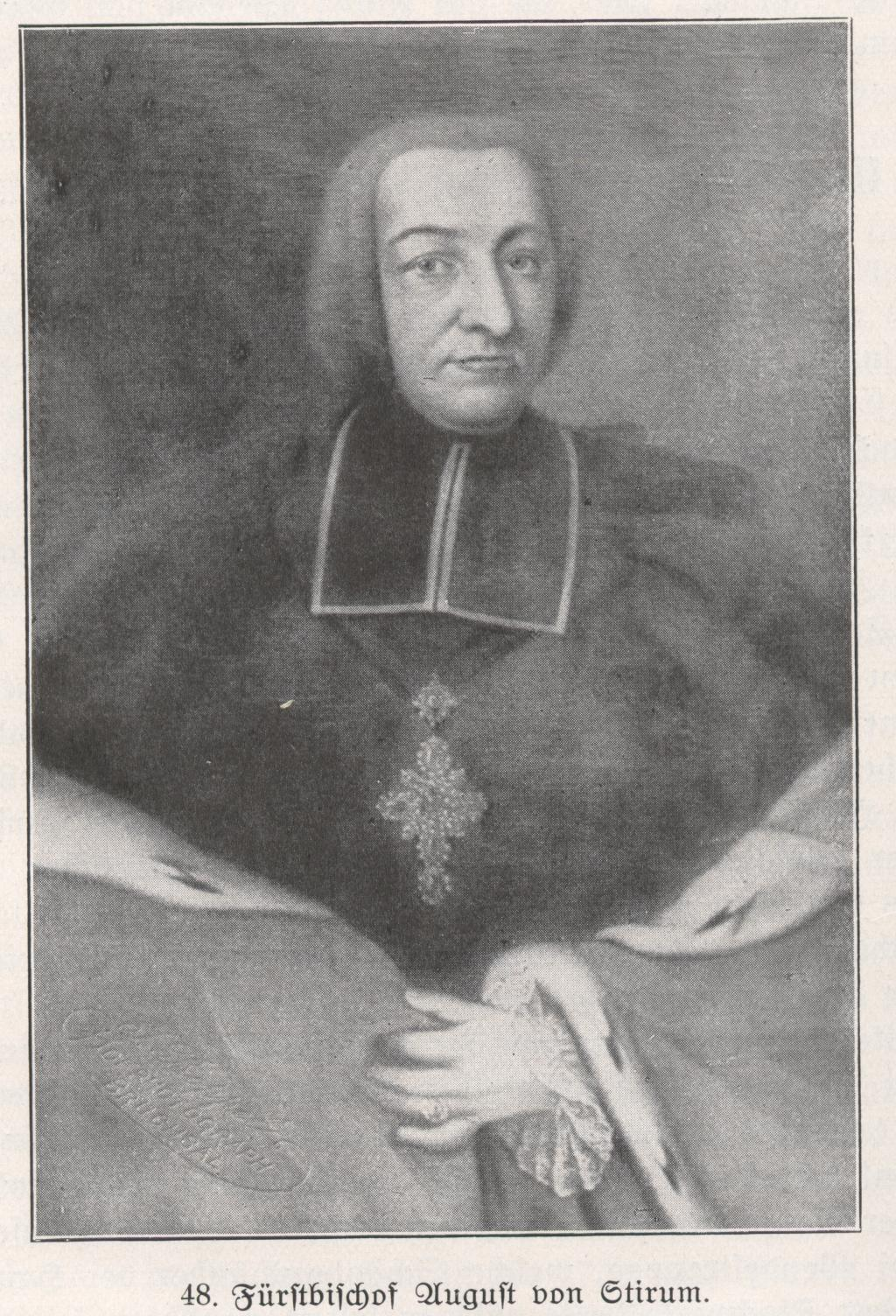
His son, Prince-Bishop August von Limburg-Stirum.

Otto Ernst Leopold von Limburg-Stirum (10 January 1684 – 4 March 1754), was Count of Limburg Styrum and Bronckhorst, and Sovereign Lord of Gemen and Raesfeld.

== Early life ==
Born into the noble House of Limburg-Stirum on 10 January 1684 in Borken, Burg Gemen, Otto Ernst Leopold was the eldest child and the only son of Count Hermann Otto II von Limburg-Stirum-Bronckhorst (1646-1704) and his wife, Countess Charlotte Amalie von Vehlen und Meggen (1662-1727).

== Career ==
He became Lord zu Gemen in 1704 at the death of his father, and remained until his death in 1754. He also inherited from his maternal grandfather Count Alexander IV von Velen zu Meggen (1600-1675), the Lordship of Raesfeld.

== Personal life ==
On 3 August 1706 he married Countess Amalia Anna Elisabeth von Schönborn-Buchheim (1686-1757), a daughter of Melchior Friedrich Graf von Schönborn-Buchheim. They had issue:

- Friedrich Karl (1710–1771), the Count of Limburg Styrum and Bronckhorst, Sovereign Lord of Gemen.
- August Philipp Karl (1721–1797), who became Prince-Bishop of Speyer; he succeeded his brother as Count of Limburg Styrum and Bronckhorst, and Sovereign Lord of Gemen.
- Charlotte Amalie (d. c. 1713).

He died on 4 March 1754 in Buda.
