= Von Stein =

von Stein is a surname. Notable people with the surname include:

- Albert von Stein (fl. 1513–22), Swiss mercenary
- Charlotte von Stein (1742–1827), German noble
- Franz Joseph von Stein (1832–1909), German Roman Catholic archbishop
- Hermann von Stein (1854–1927), Prussian general and minister of war
- Lenore Von Stein, composer and opera singer
- Lieth Von Stein (1946–1988), American murder victim
- Lorenz von Stein (1815–1890), German economist and sociologist
- Margherita von Stein (1921-2003), Italian gallerist and art collector
- Pedro Koechlin von Stein, Peruvian politician
- MJ Hegar, nee von Stein, American politician

== See also ==
- House of Graben von Stein
