= Hermann Otto II of Limburg Stirum =

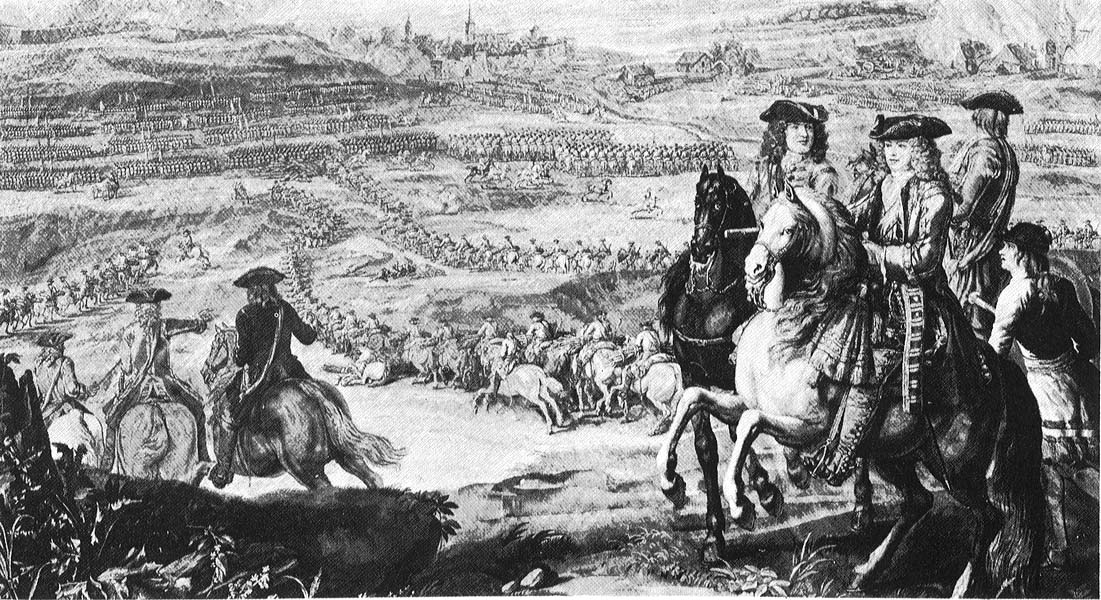
Hermann Otto II personally led Marlborough's second assault on Schellenberg on 2 July 1704, where he was mortally wounded.

Field Marshal Hermann Otto II of Limburg Stirum (1 April 1646 – Donauwörth, 8 July 1704), count of Limburg Stirum and Bronckhorst, sovereign lord zu Gemen, was the son of Adolf Ernst of Limburg Stirum and an imperial Field Marshal.

He inherited the immediate lordship of Gemen in 1675, being 18 years after the death of his father during which the regency on Gemen was exercised by his mother Isabella countess von Vehlen und Meggen zu Raesfeld. The reason for the regency is not known. On 15 September 1700, a decision by the Courts confirmed its succession right over Gemen.

== Military career ==
He served in a Bayreuth regiment. In 1678 he was named commandant of an imperial regiment. After his nomination as General-Major in 1684 he distinguished himself several times in the wars against the Turcs. He became Field Marshal in 1696.

in 1701 he fought in the War of the Spanish Succession in the service of the Holy Roman Emperor Leopold I against France and Bavaria. In 1703, he lost the Battle of Höchstädt against the French-Bavarian forces under General Villars. In 1704, he led the second assault on enemy positions in the Battle of Schellenberg and was mortally wounded. He died a few days later.

== Marriage and children ==
He married in 1678 Charlotte Amalie countess von Vehlen und Meggen zu Raesfeld (born 1662, died 1718). They had six children:

- Otto Leopold Ernst, count of Limburg Styrum and Bronckhorst, sovereign lord zu Gemen and lord zu Raesfeld (born 1688, died 1754);
- Isabelle Wilhelmine (born 1696), married firstly in 1729 to Count Johann Kajetan von Kolowrat (died 1729) and then secondly to Baron Albert Eugen von Przichowsky (died 1737);
- Sophie (born 1689, died 1714), married in 1711 count Maximilian von Reinstein-Tattenbach (died 1762);
- Maria Anna;
- Bernhardine (died 1764), a nun in Bergen
- Magdalene Sibylle (born 1698, died 1762)

== Literature ==
- Spencer, Charles (2005). Blenheim: Battle for Europe. Phoenix. ISBN 0-304-36704-4
