= Gemen =

Imperial State of the Holy Roman Empire

Lordship of Gemen
- 962–1806
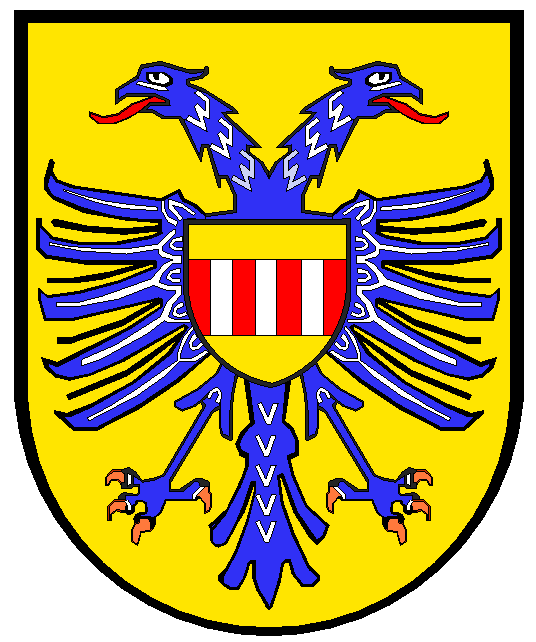
- Coat of arms
- Status: State of the Holy Roman Empire
- Capital: Gemen
- Government: Feudal Lordship
- Historical era: Middle Ages to Napoleonic Era
  - First mentioned: 962
  - Mediatised to Salm: 1806
Succeeded by
Principality of Salm
- Today part of: Borken District

Gemen was an immediate, sovereign lordship of the Holy Roman Empire, in the Lower Rhine region. Since Gemen had a vote in the Imperial Diet it was also an Imperial Estate. It was centered on Gemen, a small town and castle in the present municipality of Borken, western North Rhine-Westphalia.

Gemen is first mentioned in 962. In 1282, Gemen became a fief of the Counts of Cleves. The line of the Lords of Gemen became extinct in 1492, and Gemen passed to the Counts of Schaumburg and Holstein-Pinneberg through the heiress Cordula of Gemen, to form the County of Schaumburg and Gemen.

In 1640, the immediate lordship of Gemen passed for two centuries to the Counts of Limburg Stirum. In a partition in 1644, Gemen passed to the line of Limburg Stirum Gemen, then in 1782, with extinction of Gemen branch of the House of Limburg Stirum, Gemen was inherited by the line of Limburg Stirum Iller-Aichheim.

When Ferdinand IV of Limburg Stirum died at the age of 15 in 1800, the line Limburg-Styrum-Styrum failed to inherit Gemen, which then passed to the barons of Boyneburg-Bömelberg for 6 years, until the mediatisation of 1806.

- 1640-1644 - Herman Otto I, count of Limburg and Bronckhorst, Sovereign Lord zu Gemen;
- 1644-1657 - Adolf Ernst, count of Limburg Stirum, Sovereign Lord zu Gemen, second son of the above;
- 1657-1675 - (Maria) Isabella countess von Vehlen und Meggen zu Raesfeld, wife of Adolf Ernst of Limburg Stirum above, is Regent of Gemen;
- 1675-1704 - Hermann Otto II, count of Limburg Stirum and Bronckhorst, Sovereign Lord zu Gemen, son of the two above. On 15 September 1700 a decision by the Courts confirmed its succession right.
- 1704-1743 - Otto Leopold, count of Limburg Stirum and Bronckhorst, Sovereign Lord zu Gemen and Raesfeld, son of the above;
- 1743-1771 - Friedrich Karl, count of Limburg Stirum and Bronckhorst, Sovereign Lord zu Gemen, son of the above;
- 1771-1776 - August Philip, Prince-Bishop of Speyer, count of Limburg Stirum and Bronckhorst, Sovereign Lord zu Gemen, brother of the above.
- 1776-1798 - Karl Josef, count of Limburg Stirum, Sovereign Lord zu Gemen, cousin of the above;
- 1798-1800 - Ferdinand IV, count of Limburg Stirum zu Illereichen, grandson of the above, was the last Sovereign Lord zu Gemen before it passed to the Barons of Boyneburg-Bömelberg in 1800.

In 1806, Gemen was mediatised to the Princes of Salm-Kyrburg. It passed to France in 1810, then to Prussia in 1814.

== Sources ==
- Dr. A.J. Bonke: De takken Gemen en Styrum van het geslacht van Limburg Stirum, Stichting van Limburg Stirum, The Hague, 2007
- A. Giraud, M. Huberty, F. and B. Magdelaine: L'Allemagne Dynastique, volume VII
