= Raesfeld =

Place in North Rhine-Westphalia, Germany

- Municipality
- Flag Coat of arms

- Location of Raesfeld within Borken district
- Interactive map of Raesfeld
- Location within Germany Location within North Rhine-Westphalia
- Coordinates: 51°46′N 6°50′E
- Country: Germany
- State: North Rhine-Westphalia
- Admin. region: Münster
- District: Borken
- Subdivisions: 10

Government
  - Mayor (2020–25): Martin Tesing (CDU)

Area
  - Total: 57.81 km^{2} (22.32 sq mi)
- Elevation: 59 m (194 ft)

Population (2025-12-31)
  - Total: 11,627
  - Density: 201.1/km^{2} (520.9/sq mi)
- Time zone: UTC+01:00 (CET)
  - Summer (DST): UTC+02:00 (CEST)
- Postal codes: 46348
- Dialling codes: 0 28 65
- Vehicle registration: BOR
- Website: www.gemeinde-raesfeld.de

Raesfeld (German pronunciation: [ˈʁaːsfɛlt]) is a municipality in the district of Borken in the state of North Rhine-Westphalia, Germany. It is located approximately 10 km south of Borken and 30 km east of the Dutch border.

Raesfeld's landmark is the moated castle Schloss Raesfeld, originally built in the 13th century and extended and remodeled in Renaissance style in the 17th century. It is now primarily used by the state of North Rhine-Westphalia as a center for the teaching of crafts; the formal gardens have been lost, but the wildlife park has been restored and is part of the European Garden Heritage Network.

The municipality of Raesfeld includes Erle, a village within the Naturpark Hohe Mark that has an ancient oak, the Femeiche, thought to be 600–850 years old and named for Vehmic court sessions formerly held under it.

== Population ==
Historical population

Year	Pop.	±% p.a.
1965	5,762	—
1970	6,166	+1.36%
1975	6,937	+2.38%
1980	7,677	+2.05%
1985	8,504	+2.07%
1990	9,323	+1.86%
1995	10,510	+2.43%

Year	Pop.	±% p.a.
2000	11,071	+1.05%
2005	11,177	+0.19%
2010	11,016	−0.29%
2015	11,378	+0.65%
2020	11,515	+0.24%
2025	11,627	+0.19%

Source: Landesdatabank Nordrhein-Westfalen

== Gallery ==
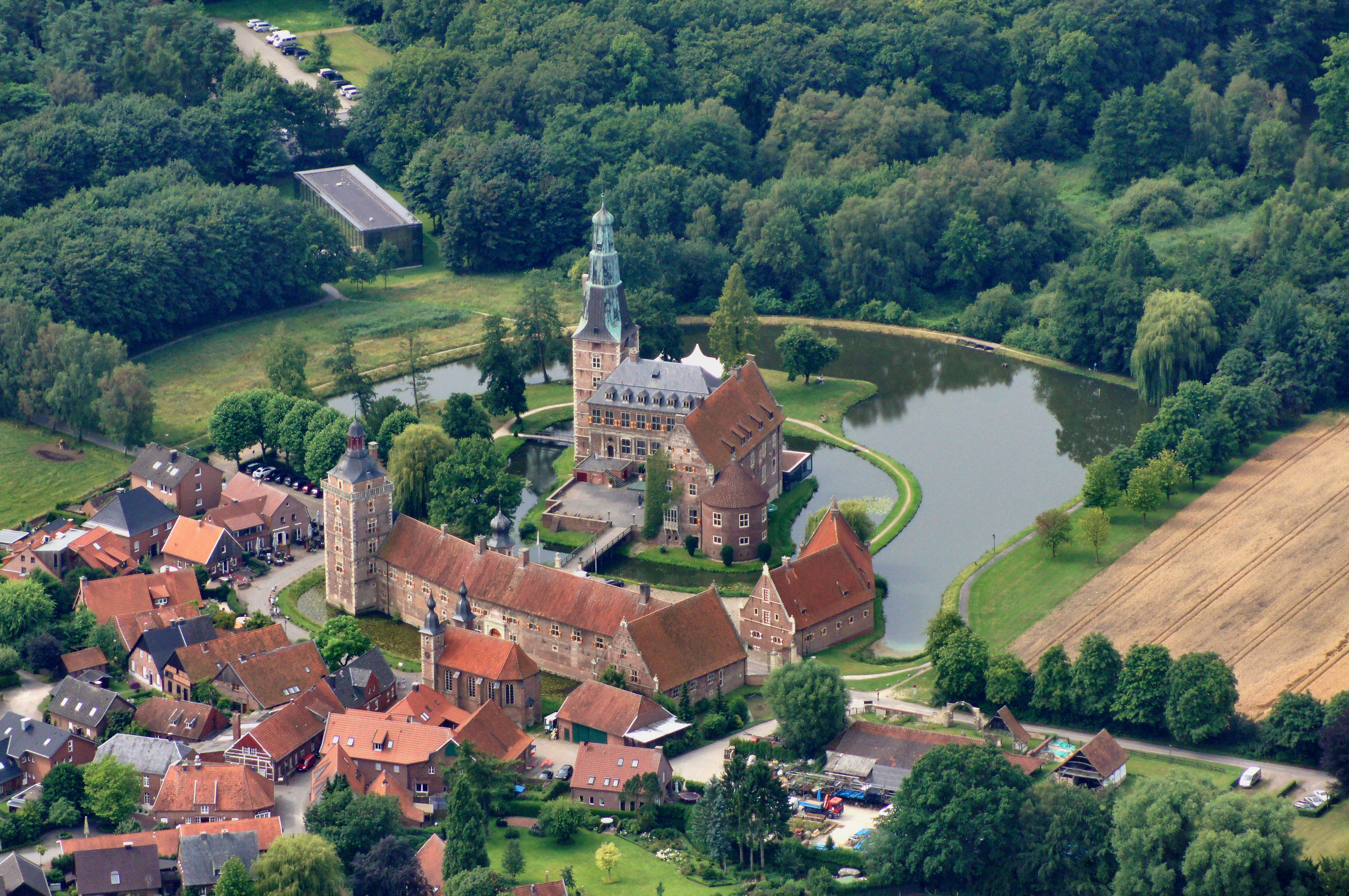
Aerial view of Schloss Raesfeld on the outskirts of Raesfeld

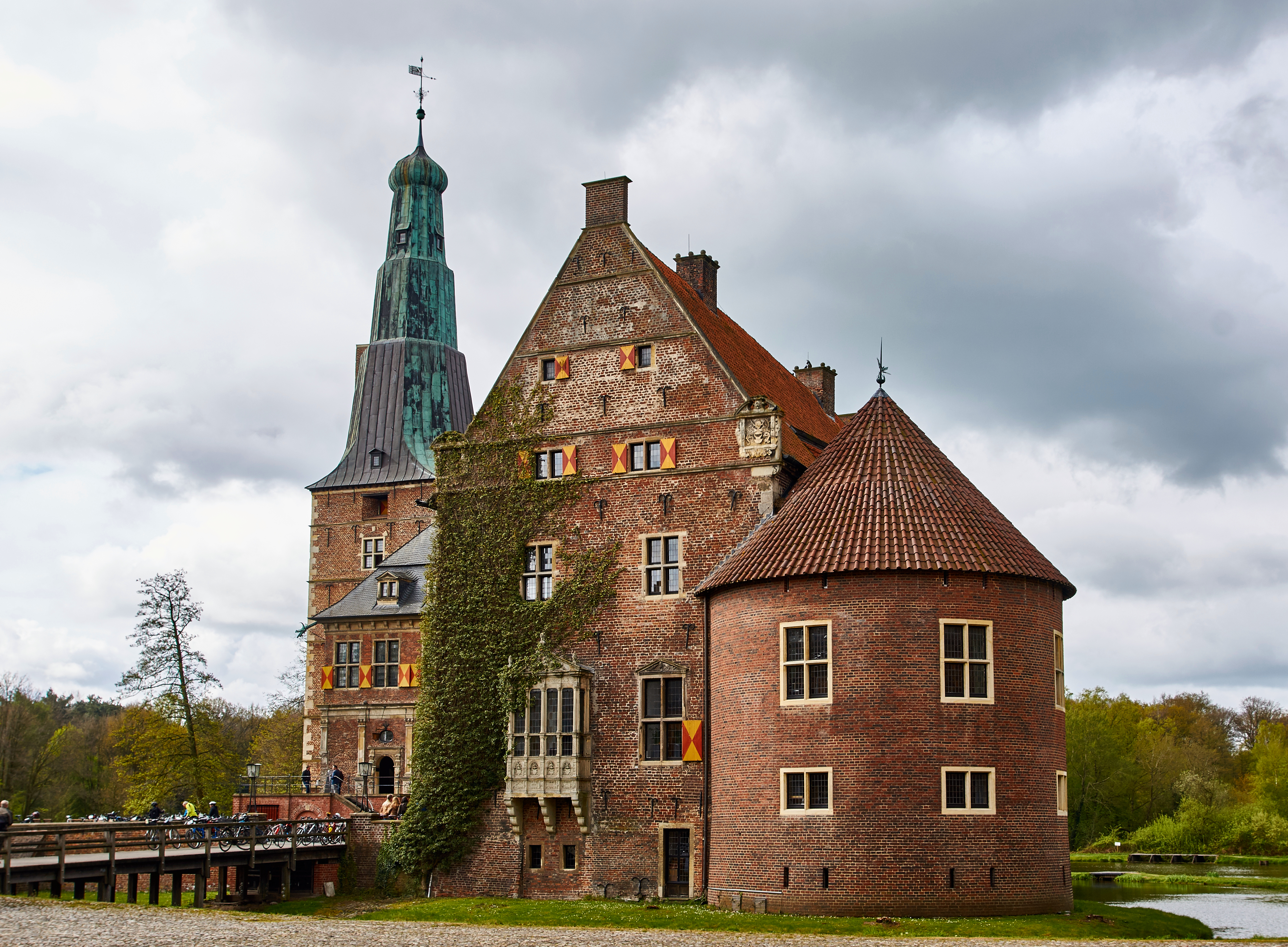
Schloss Raesfeld, east facade

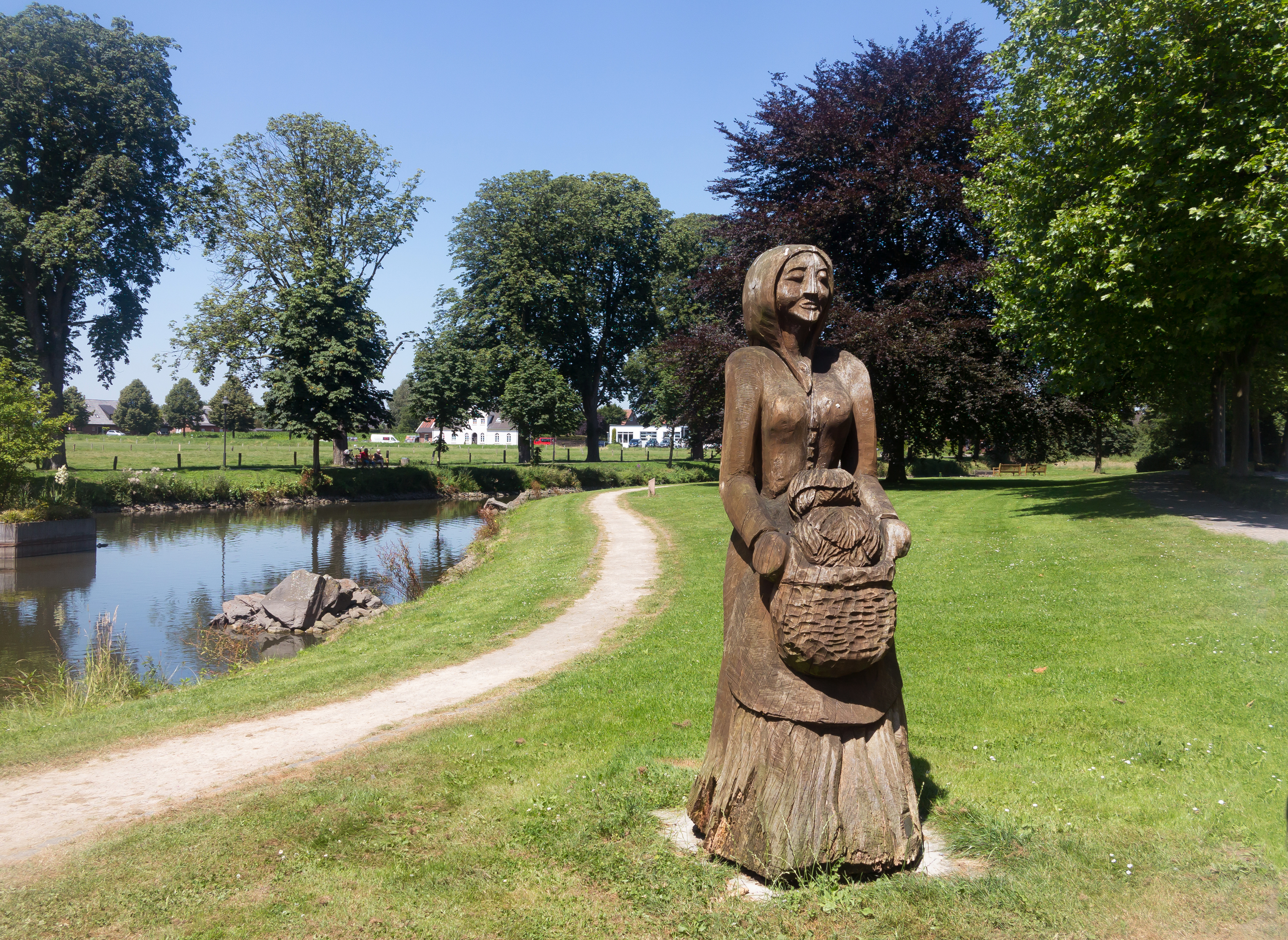
Kappes Anna (Cabbage Anna) sculpture

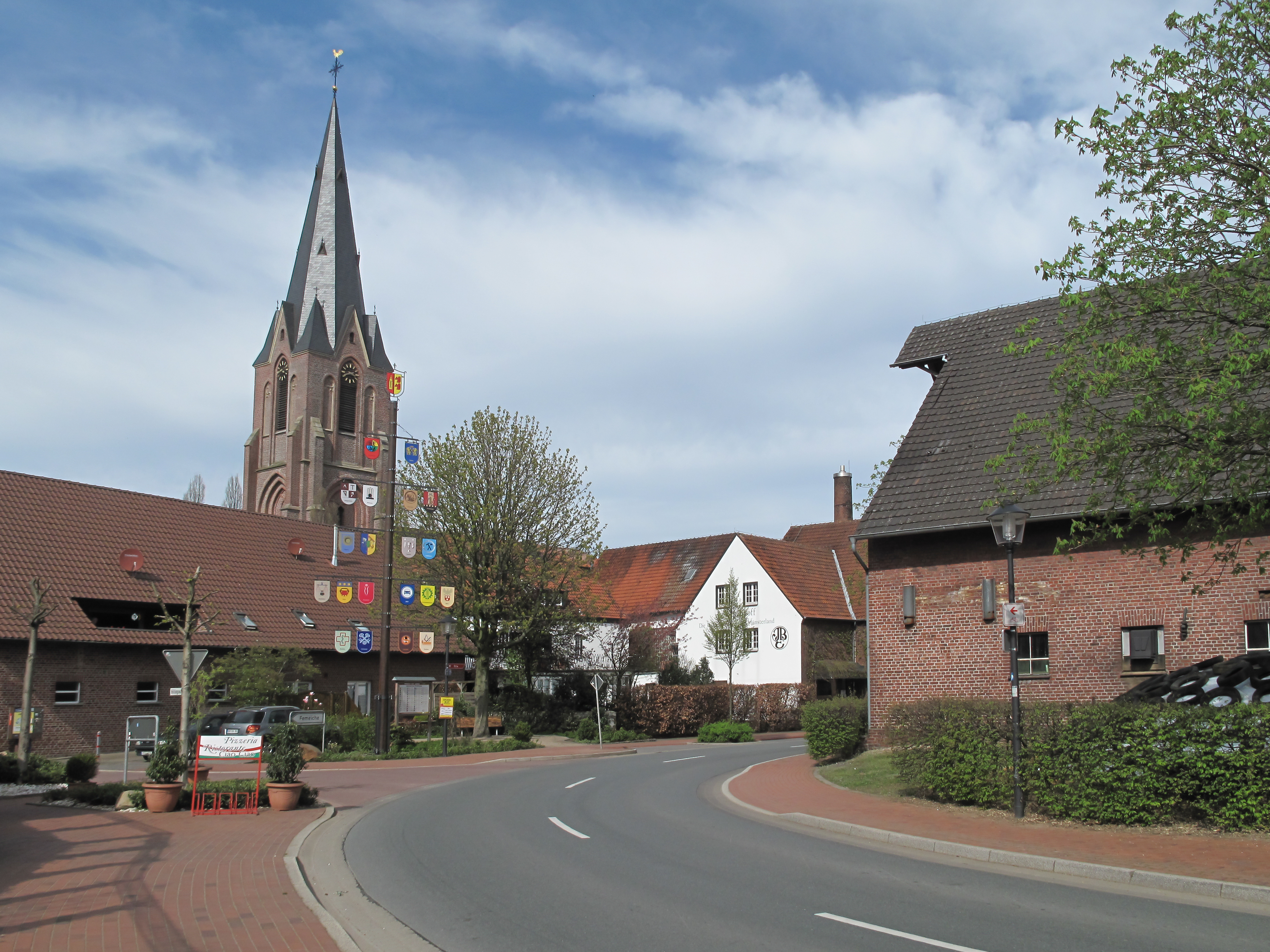
Erle, with church of St. Silvester
