= Wilhelm I of Limburg =

15th-century German noble

Wilhelm I of Limburg, count of Limburg (fl. 1422–1498), son of Eberhard of Limburg.

He married Agnes von Limburg and they had issue:

- Adolf of Limburg, count of Limburg (died 1506);
- Anna, Abbess of Vilich and Borghorst (fl. 1507);
- Ponzetta, Abbess of Herford (died 1524);
- Sophia, married in 1497 Reiner von Strünkede (died 1535).

== Literature ==
- Genealogische Handbuch des Adels, Gräfliche Häuser A Band II, 1955;
- W. Gf v. Limburg Stirum, Stamtafel der Graven van Limburg Stirum, 's Gravenhage 1878;
