= Mary Magdalene of Limburg-Stirum =

Dutch countess (1632–1707)

- Countess of Nassau-Siegen

Countess of Bronkhorst, Lady of Wisch, Borculo, Lichtenvoorde and Wildenborch, and hereditary lady banneret of the Duchy of Guelders and the County of Zutphen
- Coat of arms
- Reign: 1661–1707
- Predecessor: George Ernest of Limburg-Stirum
- Successor: Frederick William Adolf of Nassau-Siegen
- Full name: Mary Magdalene Countess of Limburg-Stirum
- Native name: Maria Magdalena Gravin van Limburg-Stirum
- Born: 1632
- Died: 27 December 1707; Nassauischer Hof, Siegen
- Buried: 29 December 1707; Fürstengruft, Siegen
- Noble family: House of Limburg-Stirum
- Spouse: Henry of Nassau-Siegen
- Issue Detail: William Maurice; Sophie Amalie; Frederick Henry
- Father: George Ernest of Limburg-Stirum
- Mother: Magdalene of Bentheim-Tecklenburg

Countess Mary Magdalene (Note: "Europäische Stammtafeln calls her Maria Elisabeth. On the other hand, we found Maria Magdalena in the Geschiedenis van de Graven van Limburg-Stirum volume III, 1, 9, which is confirmed by the death notification: «Maria Magdalena».") of Limburg-Stirum (1632 – 27 December 1707), Dutch: Maria Magdalena Gravin van Limburg-Stirum, official titles: gravin van Limburg en Bronkhorst, vrouwe van Stirum, Wisch en Borculo, erfbaandervrouw van het hertogdom Gelre en het graafschap Zutphen), was a countess from the House of Limburg-Stirum. In 1661 she succeeded her father as countess of Bronkhorst, lady of Wisch, Borculo, Lichtenvoorde and Wildenborch, and hereditary lady banneret of the Duchy of Guelders and the County of Zutphen. Through her marriage to a count of Nassau-Siegen these possessions came into the possession of this cadet branch of the Ottonian Line of the House of Nassau.

== Biography ==
Mary Magdalene was born in 1632 (Note: "Geschiedenis der Graven van Limburg Stirum sets the birth around 1632.") as the daughter and only child of Count George Ernest of Limburg-Stirum and his first wife Countess Magdalene of Bentheim-Tecklenburg. The exact date and place of birth of Mary Magdalene are unknown. As the only child of her father, Mary Magdalene was heiress to the County of Bronkhorst and the heerlijkheden of Wisch, Borculo, Lichtenvoorde and Wildenborch.

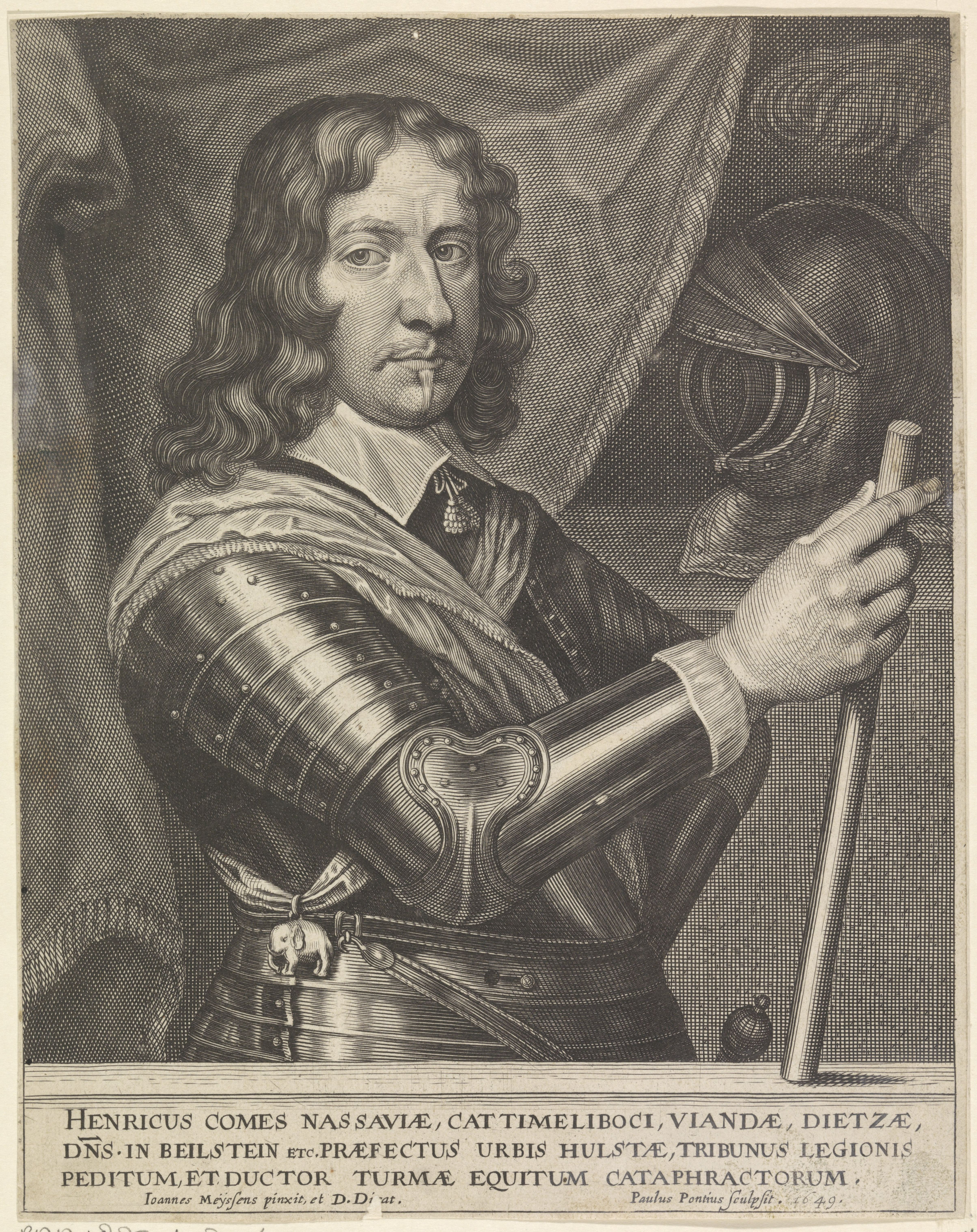
Count Henry of Nassau-Siegen, the husband of Mary Magdalene. Print by Paulus Pontius after a painting by Joannes Meyssens. Rijksmuseum Amsterdam.

Mary Magdalene married at Wisch Castle in Terborg on 19/29 April 1646 (Note: "On 9‑3‑1646 in Europäische Stammtafeln I, 117 en IV, 39. On 19‑4‑1646 in Geschiedenis der Graven van Limburg Stirum volume III, 1, 9 with indication of the place «Terborg». On 29‑4‑1646 in the Genealogisches Handbuch des Adels XXXIII, 51. 9‑3‑1646 is the date of the signing of the marriage contract (see Menk (1967), p. 2). Although a notification was sent to the princes of Holstein inviting them to the ceremony on 15/25 April, must be admitted that it was postponed to 19/29 April (see the marriage registers of Terborg, and Menk (1967), p. 2). The archives of the princes of Wittgenstein in Laasphe (F., 320^{III}) also contain a draft of a congratulatory letter to Count Henry of Nassau-Siegen on the occasion of his marriage on 19/29 April, announced on 16/26 March.") to Count Henry of Nassau-Siegen (Siegen Castle, 9 August 1611 (Note: "From Siegen, on 9-8-1611, John 'the Middle' announced the birth of a son «heute zwischen vier und fünf Uhren vormittags». See State Archives Marburg (115, Waldeck 2, Nassau 337). See also a letter from John 'the Middle' dated Siegen 16‑8‑1611: «den 9. dieses» (State Archives Wiesbaden 170^{III}, Korrespondenzen) and, under the same number: «Ordnung für den Ablaufder Kindtaufe auf dem Schloss (zu Siegen) Heinrich Gf. zu Nassau» (born in Siegen 9‑8‑1611, baptised Siegen, 29 Sept. 1611), Siegen, 29‑9‑1611.") – Hulst, 27 October/7 November 1652 (Note: "The genealogists usually say that he died on 27-10-1652. However, there is a notification in the State Archives Marburg (115, Waldeck 2, Nassau 339) dated 7 November 1652. From Hulst, Mary Magdalene, Countess of Nassau-Siegen, reports the death of her husband, which took place «heute morgen umb 4 Uhren».")), the fourth son of Count John VII 'the Middle' of Nassau-Siegen and his second wife, Duchess Margaret of Schleswig-Holstein-Sonderburg. Mary Magdalene's great-great-grandmother Countess Mary of Nassau-Siegen was a younger sister of Henry's great-grandfather Count William I 'the Rich' of Nassau-Siegen.

The will and testament of Count John VII 'the Middle' of 1621 bequeathed John Maurice and his younger brothers from their father's second marriage the district of Freudenberg, some villages in the Haingericht (Note: "The Haingericht was certainly located around the castle of Hainchen, which passed with its dependencies to the House of Nassau in 1313. See Historische Stätten Deutschlands III, 245.") and a third part of the administration of the city of Siegen. After his older half-brother John 'the Younger' had accepted the homage of the city of Siegen for the entire county of Nassau-Siegen on 12 January 1624 and had voluntarily ceded the sovereignty over the Hilchenbach district with Ginsburg Castle and some villages belonging to the Ferndorf and Netphen districts to his younger brother William on 13/23 January 1624, Henry and his brothers, with the exception of the oldest two brothers John Maurice and George Frederick, accepted only modest appanages.

Henry served the Dutch Republic as an officer in the Dutch States Army since 1632, in diplomatic missions and as governor of Hulst since 1645. He died in 1652 and was first buried in Terborg. On 17 July 1669 (Note: Lück & Wunderlich (1956), p. 27 however, mention the date 19 July 1669.) he was reburied in the Fürstengruft in Siegen.

After the death of Mary Magdalene's mother in 1649, her father remarried at Wisch Castle in Terborg on 13 January 1656 to Countess Sophie Margaret of Nassau-Siegen (Siegen Castle, 16 April 1610 – Wisch Castle, Terborg, 8/18 May 1665), an older sister of Mary Magdalene's husband. That marriage remained childless. After the death of her father in September 1661, Mary Magdalene succeeded him countess of Bronkhorst, lady of Wisch, Borculo, Lichtenvoorde and Wildenborch, and hereditary lady banneret of the Duchy of Guelders and the County of Zutphen. Thus, these properties came into the possession of the House of Nassau.

Mary Magdalene died in the Nassauischer Hof in Siegen on 27 December 1707. (Note: "See the parish registers of Siegen. Burial on the 29th in the royal crypt. A notification dated Siegen 27 December 1707 (State Archives Wiesbaden 130^{II}, 2380^{III} c) states that she died «heute Nachmittag zwischen 1 u. 2 Uhren». An identical notification is kept in the State Archives Marburg (4f. Nassau-Siegen, Nr. 241).") She was buried on 29 December in the Fürstengruft there.

== Issue ==
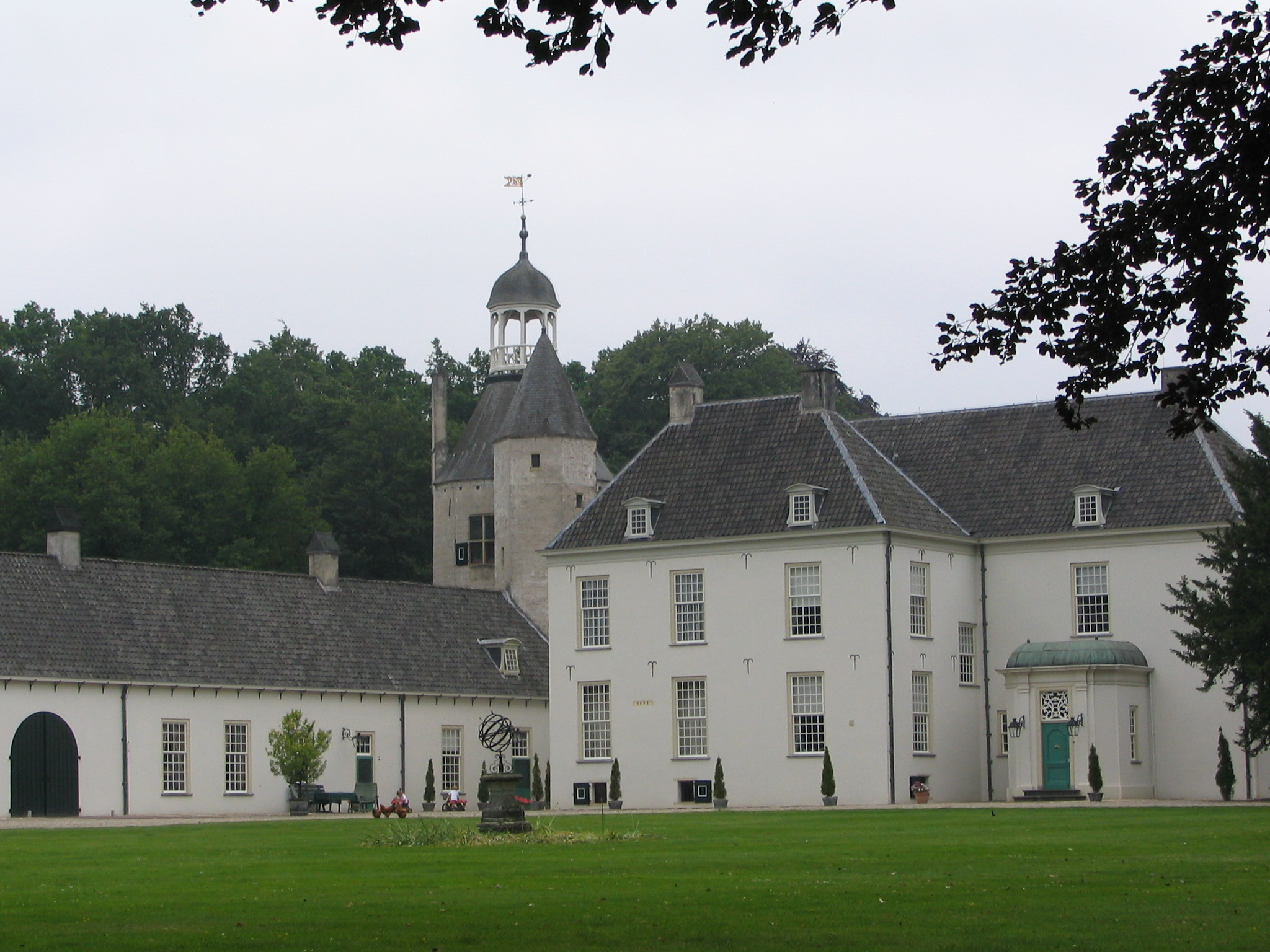
Wisch Castle in Terborg, 2004.

From the marriage of Henry and Mary Magdalene the following children were born:

1. Ernestine (Wisch Castle, Terborg, 15 November 1647 (Note: "Baptismal register of the Reformed Church in Terborg: born on 15‑11, at eleven o'clock in the morning.") – Hulst, October 1652 (Note: "See Royal House Archive of the Netherlands IV/1512. The notification was sent from Hulst to Mengerskirchen on 10‑10‑1652, where it was received on 29‑10‑1652: «im 5 Jahr ihrer blühenden Jugend … im verwichenen Montage abends umb 7 Uhr». If the letter, written on 10 October, is dated in the old style, «verwichene Montag» was on 4 October. But it was the new style that was used in Hulst. Furthermore, the letter is addressed to John Louis, reigning prince of Nassau-Hadamar, who belonged to the Catholic religion. This is another reason to assume that the letter is dated in the new style and that Ernestine died on Monday 7 October 1652, new style.")).
2. Fürst William Maurice (Wisch Castle, Terborg, 18/28 January 1649 (Note: "See the baptismal register of Terborg: the 18th, at three o'clock in the afternoon.") – Nassauischer Hof, Siegen, 23 January 1691^{Jul.} (Note: "See notification of death (State Archives Marburg 115, Waldeck, 2, Nassau, 339) from Siegen 24‑1‑1691: «gestern Freytag den 23. dieses (therefore old style) abendts zwischen 5 und 6 Uhren».")), succeeded his uncle John Maurice as Fürst of Nassau-Siegen in 1679. Married at Schaumburg Castle on 6 February 1678^{Jul.} (Note: "In the parish records of Terborg it is stated that the marriage took place in Schaumburg («in arce Schaumburgenei»). See the marriage announcement (State Archives Marburg 4f, Nassau-Siegen, 203) at Schaumburg 10‑2 old style: «den 6 dieses … das fürstl. Beylager gehalten». Dek (1962) and Europäische Stammtafeln mention 6‑1‑1678; that is the engagement date (see the notification in State Archives Marburg 4f, Nassau-Siegen 203). Dek (1970) no longer gives a place and date of marriage, but only mentions that the announcement was made in Lichtenvoorde on 3‑2‑1678.") to Princess Ernestine Charlotte of Nassau-Schaumburg (Schaumburg Castle, 20 May 1662^{Jul.} (Note: "See State Archives Wiesbaden (170^{III}) several birth notifications dated Schaumburg 21/31 May 1662: «gestern den 20/30ten diesses, des Abends zwischen 8 und 9 Uhren».") – Nassauischer Hof, Siegen, 21 February 1732 (Note: "See State Archives Wiesbaden (170^{III}) notification of death dated Siegen 23‑2‑1732: «vorgestern Mittag zwischen 11 und 12 Uhren in dem 70ten Jahres ihres Alters». See also the parish records of Siegen. Europäische Stammtafeln I, 117 and 118 states the fantasised dates 21‑2‑1714 and 19‑10‑1714 respectively.")).
3. Sophie Amalie (Wisch Castle, Terborg, 10 January 1650^{Jul.} (Note: "See the parish registers of Terborg: the 10th at half past seven in the evening. See the notification of birth in the archives of Copenhagen (Tyske Kanc UA, N.-Siegen A I, 1) from Terborg 11/21‑1‑1650: «gestern abend zwischen sieben und acht Uhren». Europäische Stammtafeln I, 117 states born on 20‑2‑1650.") – Mitau, 15/25 November 1688 (Note: "See notification of death (State Archives Marburg 4f, Kurland Nr. 8) from Mitau, 26‑11‑1688: «Gestern Morgens umb acht Uhren nachdem Ihro Lbd. zwey Tage nach ihrer Entbindung mit grosser Schwachheit gefallen». See Royal House Archive of the Netherlands IV/1514: «Bericht über Entbindung der Sophia Amalia Fürstin zu Nassau Siegen, verm. Herzg. zu Kurland von einer Tochter am 5/15 November … und der bald darauf am 15/25 November, des Morgens um 8 Uhr, erfolgte Ableben der Kindbetterin, deren Leichnam am 16/26 Dezember des Abends am 7 Uhr in die reformierte Kirche zu Mitau überführt wurde». According to Europäische Stammtafeln and Dek (1970) the death occurred on 25‑12‑1688.")), married in The Hague on 5 October 1675^{Greg.} (Note: "See Royal House Archive of the Netherlands IV/1513. According to this document, the marriage contract was signed on 27‑9‑1678 in The Hague. Another copy of the contract signed on the same day, but in Mitau, is to be found in the archives of the princes of Sayn-Wittgenstein-Hohenstein at Wittgenstein Castle in Laasphe, Urk. 187 XXXXVI. It states that the marriage (Beilager) was consummated in The Hague on 5 October (new style) 1675.") to Duke Frederick Casimir of Courland (6 July 1650 – 22 January 1698).
4. Frederick Henry (Note: Huberty, et al. (1981), p. 274 names him Frédéric. The given name Friedrich Heinrich in Menk (2004), p. 192, Lück (1981), p. 113 and Lück & Wunderlich (1956), p. 134. The given name Frederik Hendrik in Dek (1970), p. 96 and Vorsterman van Oyen (1882), p. 127. The given name Frederik Hendrik/Friedrich Heinrich in Blok (1911), p. 902.) (Wisch Castle, Terborg, 11 November 1651 (Note: "See the parish registers of Terborg. See State Archives Wiesbaden (170^{III}), two notifications of birth dated Terborg 15‑11‑1651: «uff vergangenen Martini, welcher war den 11ten Novemb.».") – Roermond, 4 September 1676 (Note: "State Archives Wiesbaden (170^{III}), several notifications of death, of which at least two, dated Cleves 9‑9‑1676, state «am 4. dieses, abents um 7 Uhr zu Roeremondi». Dek (1970) says he died on the battlefield «sneuvelde bij Roermond», which hardly corresponds to the phrases in the notifications of death: «durch einen sanften und seligen Tod» and «nach ausgestandener schwerer Kranckheit». The date 25‑8 (also found in Europäische Stammtafeln) has to correspond with the old style. Should it read: deceased 4‑9‑1676, new style?")), was a colonel in the Dutch States Army.

The sons William Maurice and Frederick Henry were adopted by their uncle John Maurice of Nassau-Siegen after the death of their father. William Maurice, Sophie Amalie and Frederick Henry were elevated to the rank and title of prince(ss) in 1664. (Note: "See Dek (1962), p. 92.")

== Ancestors ==
Ancestors of Mary Magdalene of Limburg-Stirum
Great-great-grandparents	George of Limburg-Stirum (ca. 1500–1552) ⚭ 1539; Ermgard of Wisch (1520–1587)	Jobst II of Hoya (1493–1545) ⚭ ? Anne Magdalene of Gleichen (?–1545)	Jobst I of Holstein-Schauenburg-Pinneberg (1483–1531) ⚭ 1506; Mary of Nassau-Siegen (1491–1547)	Ernest I 'the Confessor' of Brunswick-Lüneburg (1497–1546) ⚭ 1528; Sophia of Mecklenburg-Schwerin (1508–1541)	Arnold II of Bentheim-Steinfurt (?–1544) ⚭ ? Walburga of Brederode-Neuenahr (?–?)	Conrad of Tecklenburg-Schwerin (1501–1557) ⚭ 1527; Mechthild of Hesse (ca. 1490–1558)	Gumprecht I of Neuenahr-Alpen (1465–1504) ⚭ 1490; Amelie of Wertheim (1460–1532)	Wirich V of Daun-Falkenstein (ca. 1473–1546) ⚭ 1505; Irmgard of Sayn (?–1551)
Great-grandparents	Herman George of Limburg-Stirum (1540–1574) ⚭ 1557; Mary of Hoya (1534–1612)		Otto IV of Holstein-Schauenburg-Pinneberg (ca. 1517–1576) ⚭ 1558; Elisabeth Ursula of Brunswick-Lüneburg (1539–1586)		Eberwin III of Bentheim-Steinfurt (1536–1562) ⚭ 1553; Anna of Tecklenburg-Schwerin (1532–1582)		Gumprecht II of Neuenahr-Alpen (ca. 1503–1555) ⚭ 1542; Amöna of Daun-Falkenstein (ca. 1520–ca. 1582)	
Grandparents	Jobst of Limburg-Stirum (1560–1621) ⚭ 1591; Mary of Holstein-Schauenburg-Pinneberg (1559–1616)				Arnold IV of Bentheim-Tecklenburg (1554–1606) ⚭ 1573; Magdalena of Neuenahr-Alpen (1553–1627)			
Parents	George Ernest of Limburg-Stirum (1593–1661) ⚭ 1603; Magdalene of Bentheim-Tecklenburg (1591–1649)							

== Sources ==
- Aßmann, Helmut & Menk, Friedhelm (1996). Auf den Spuren von Nassau und Oranien in Siegen (in German). Siegen: Gesellschaft für Stadtmarketing Siegen e.V.
- Behr, Kamill (1854). Genealogie der in Europa regierenden Fürstenhäuser (in German). Leipzig: Verlag von Bernhard Tauchnitz.
- Blok, P.J. (1911). "Frederik Hendrik, 2 Friedrich Heinrich". In Molhuysen, P.C. & Blok, P.J. (eds.). Nieuw Nederlandsch Biografisch Woordenboek (in Dutch). Vol. Eerste deel. Leiden: A.W. Sijthoff. p. 902.
- Blok, P.J. (1911). "Hendrik, Heinrich". In Molhuysen, P.C. & Blok, P.J. (eds.). Nieuw Nederlandsch Biografisch Woordenboek (in Dutch). Vol. Eerste deel. Leiden: A.W. Sijthoff. pp. 1075–1076.
- Blok, P.J. (1911). "Willem Maurits, Wilhelm Moritz". In Molhuysen, P.C. & Blok, P.J. (eds.). Nieuw Nederlandsch Biografisch Woordenboek (in Dutch). Vol. Eerste deel. Leiden: A.W. Sijthoff. p. 1578.
- Dek, A.W.E. (1962). Graf Johann der Mittlere von Nassau-Siegen und seine 25 Kinder (in German). Rijswijk: Krips Repro.
- Dek, A.W.E. (1968). "De afstammelingen van Juliana van Stolberg tot aan het jaar van de Vrede van Münster". Spiegel der Historie. Maandblad voor de geschiedenis der Nederlanden (in Dutch). 1968 (7/8): 228–303.
- Dek, A.W.E. (1970). Genealogie van het Vorstenhuis Nassau (in Dutch). Zaltbommel: Europese Bibliotheek.
- von Ehrenkrook, Hans Friedrich; Förster, Karl & Marchtaler, Kurt Erhard (1928). Ahnenreihen aus allen deutschen Gauen. Beilage zum Archiv für Sippenforschung und allen verwandten Gebieten (in German). Görlitz: Verlag für Sippenforschung und Wappenkunde C.A. Starke.
- Huberty, Michel; Giraud, Alain & Magdelaine, F. & B. (1981). l'Allemagne Dynastique (in French). Vol. Tome III: Brunswick-Nassau-Schwarzbourg. Le Perreux: Alain Giraud.
- Kooijmans, Luuc (2000). Liefde in opdracht. Het hofleven van Willem Frederik van Nassau (in Dutch). Amsterdam: Uitgeverij Bert Bakker. ISBN 90-351-2201-1.
- Lück, Alfred (1981) [1967]. Siegerland und Nederland (in German) (2nd ed.). Siegen: Siegerländer Heimatverein e.V.
- Lück, Alfred & Wunderlich, Hermann (1956) [1952]. Die Fürstengruft zu Siegen (in German). Siegen: Verkehrsverein Siegen e.V.
- Menk, Friedhelm (1967). "Johann der Mittlere, Graf zu Nassau-Siegen (1561–1623) und seine zweite Gemahlin". Siegerland (in German). Band XLIV (Heft 1): 1–28.
- Menk, Friedhelm (1967). "Wilhelm Graf zu Nassau-Siegen (1592–1642)". Siegerland (in German). Band XLIV (Heft 2): 53–59.
- Menk, Friedhelm (1971). Quellen zur Geschichte des Siegerlandes im niederländischen königlichen Hausarchiv (in German). Siegen: Stadt Siegen/Forschungsstelle Siegerland.
- Menk, Friedhelm (1979). "Johann Moritz Fürst zu Nassau-Siegen". Siegerland (in German). Band LVI (Heft 1–2): 1vv.
- Menk, Friedhelm (2004). "Die Fürstengruft zu Siegen und die darin von 1669 bis 1781 erfolgten Beisetzungen". In Burwitz, Ludwig; Menk, Friedhelm; Opfermann, Ulrich Friedrich; Pfau, Dieter & Plaum, Bernd D. (eds.). Siegener Beiträge. Jahrbuch für regionale Geschichte (in German). Vol. 9. Siegen: Geschichtswerkstatt Siegen – Arbeitskreis für Regionalgeschichte e.V. pp. 183–202. ISSN 1431-6684.
- Neander, Irene (1961). "Friedrich Kasimir Kettler". Neue Deutsche Biographie (in German). Vol. Band 5. Berlin: Duncker & Humblot. pp. 513–514. ISBN 3-428-00186-9.
- Schiemann, Theodor (1882). "Friedrich Casimir Kettler". Allgemeine Deutsche Biographie (in German). Vol. Band 15. Leipzig: Duncker & Humblot. pp. 685–688.
- Spielmann, Christian (1909). Geschichte von Nassau (Land und Haus) von den ältesten Zeiten bis zur Gegenwart (in German). Vol. Teil 1. Politische Geschichten. Wiesbaden: P. Plauen.
- Vorsterman van Oyen, A.A. (1882). Het vorstenhuis Oranje-Nassau. Van de vroegste tijden tot heden (in Dutch). Leiden/Utrecht: A.W. Sijthoff/J.L. Beijers.
