= Frederick Henry of Nassau-Siegen =

German prince and officer in the Dutch Army (1651–1676)

- Coat of arms
- Full name: Frederick Henry Prince of Nassau-Siegen
- Native name: Friedrich Heinrich Prinz von Nassau-Siegen
- Born: Friedrich Heinrich Graf zu Nassau, Katzenelnbogen, Vianden und Diez, Herr zu Beilstein; 11 November 1651; Wisch Castle, Terborg
- Died: 4 September 1676 (aged 24); Roermond
- Buried: Fürstengruft, Siegen
- Noble family: House of Nassau-Siegen
- Spouse: –
- Issue: –
- Father: Henry of Nassau-Siegen
- Mother: Mary Magdalene of Limburg-Stirum
- Occupation: Ritmeester in the Dutch States Army 1670, colonel of the infantry 1674

Prince Frederick Henry (Note: Huberty, et al. (1981), p. 274 names him Frédéric. The given name Friedrich Heinrich in Menk (2004), p. 192, Lück (1981), p. 113 and Lück & Wunderlich (1956), p. 134. The given name Frederik Hendrik in Dek (1970), p. 96 and Vorsterman van Oyen (1882), p. 127. The given name Frederik Hendrik/Friedrich Heinrich in Blok (1911), p. 902.) of Nassau-Siegen (11 November 1651 – 4 September 1676), German: Friedrich Heinrich Prinz von Nassau-Siegen, official titles: Prinz von Nassau, Graf zu Katzenelnbogen, Vianden, Diez, Limburg und Bronkhorst, Herr zu Beilstein, Stirum, Wisch, Borculo, Lichtenvoorde und Wildenborch, Erbbannerherr des Herzogtums Geldern und der Grafschaft Zutphen), was a count from the House of Nassau-Siegen, a cadet branch of the Ottonian Line of the House of Nassau. He served as an officer in the Dutch States Army. In 1664, he was elevated to the rank and title of prince.

== Biography ==
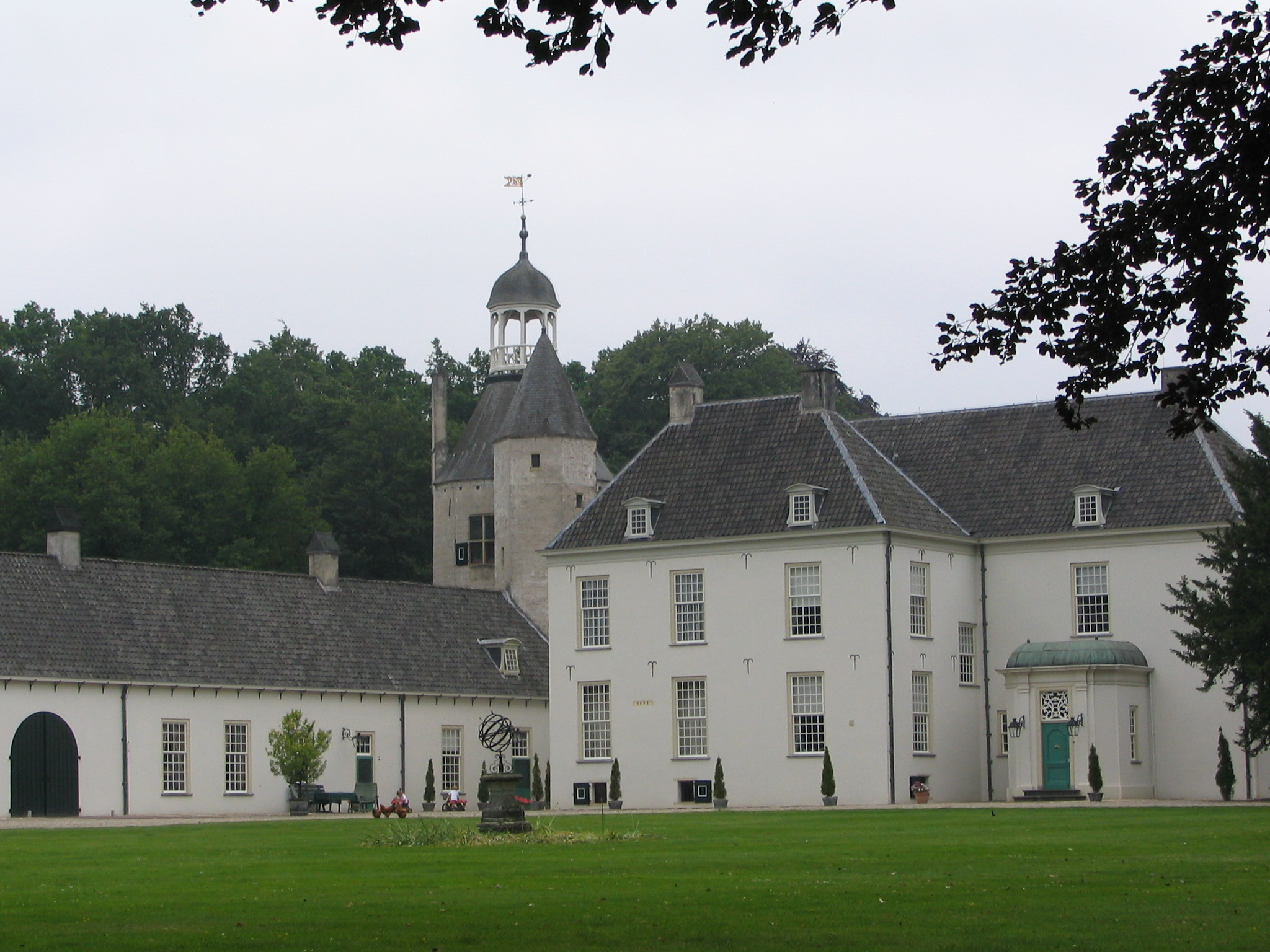
Wisch Castle in Terborg, 2004.

Frederick Henry was born at Wisch Castle in Terborg on 11 November 1651 (Note: "See the parish registers of Terborg. See State Archives Wiesbaden (170^{III}), two notifications of birth dated Terborg 15‑11‑1651: «uff vergangenen Martini, welcher war den 11ten Novemb.».") as the second son of Count Henry of Nassau-Siegen and Countess Mary Magdalene of Limburg-Stirum. After the death of their father, Frederick Henry and his brother William Maurice were adopted by their uncle Fürst John Maurice of Nassau-Siegen.

Frederick Henry and his brother William Maurice accompanied their uncle and adoptive father John Maurice on his journey to the city of Siegen, where they arrived on 21/31 August 1663. On 7 January 1664, the two brothers were inaugurated in the town hall of Siegen, where they confirmed the city privileges and liberties. Both brothers were elevated into the Reichsfürstenstand on 6 May 1664.

In 1667 Frederick Henry became a knight of the Order of Saint John (Bailiwick of Brandenburg) in Sonnenburg. On 18 December 1670 he was appointed ritmeester in the Dutch States Army, on 22 June 1674 he became colonel of the infantry.

Frederick Henry died of dysentery (Note: Dek (1970), p. 96, Blok (1911), p. 902 and Vorsterman van Oyen (1882), p. 127 state that Frederick Henry was killed in action.) in Roermond on 4 September 1676 (Note: "State Archives Wiesbaden (170^{III}), several notifications of death, of which at least two, dated Cleves 9‑9‑1676, state «am 4. dieses, abents um 7 Uhr zu Roeremondi». Dek (1970) says he died on the battlefield «sneuvelde bij Roermond», which hardly corresponds to the phrases in the notifications of death: «durch einen sanften und seligen Tod» and «nach ausgestandener schwerer Kranckheit». The date 25‑8 (also found in Europäische Stammtafeln) has to correspond with the old style. Should it read: deceased 4‑9‑1676, new style?" Dek (1970), p. 96, Lück & Wunderlich (1956), p. 134, Blok (1911), p. 902 and Vorsterman van Oyen (1882), p. 127 mention the date 25 August 1676 without stating which calendar they used.) and was buried in the Fürstengruft in Siegen.

== Ancestors ==
Ancestors of Frederick Henry of Nassau-Siegen
| Great-great-grandparents | William I 'the Rich' of Nassau-Siegen (1487–1559) ⚭ 1531; Juliane of Stolberg-Wernigerode (1506–1580) | George III of Leuchtenberg (1502–1555) ⚭ 1528; Barbara of Brandenburg-Ansbach (1495–1552) | Christian III of Denmark (1503–1559) ⚭ 1525; Dorothea of Saxe-Lauenburg (1511–1571) | Ernest V of Brunswick-Grubenhagen (1518–1567) ⚭ 1547; Margaret of Pomerania (1518–1569) | Herman George of Limburg-Stirum (1540–1574) ⚭ 1557; Mary of Hoya (1534–1612) | Otto IV of Holstein-Schauenburg-Pinneberg (ca. 1517–1576) ⚭ 1558; Elisabeth Ursula of Brunswick-Lüneburg (1539–1586) | Eberwin III of Bentheim-Steinfurt (1536–1562) ⚭ 1553; Anna of Tecklenburg-Schwerin (1532–1582) | Gumprecht II of Neuenahr-Alpen (ca. 1503–1555) ⚭ 1542; Amöna of Daun-Falkenstein (ca. 1520–ca. 1582) |
| Great-grandparents | John VI 'the Elder' of Nassau-Siegen (1536–1606) ⚭ 1559; Elisabeth of Leuchtenberg (1537–1579) | | John 'the Younger' of Schleswig-Holstein-Sonderburg (1545–1622) ⚭ 1568; Elisabeth of Brunswick-Grubenhagen (1550–1586) | | Jobst of Limburg-Stirum (1560–1621) ⚭ 1591; Mary of Holstein-Schauenburg-Pinneberg (1559–1616) | | Arnold IV of Bentheim-Tecklenburg (1554–1606) ⚭ 1573; Magdalena of Neuenahr-Alpen (1553–1627) | |
| Grandparents | John VII 'the Middle' of Nassau-Siegen (1561–1623) ⚭ 1603; Margaret of Schleswig-Holstein-Sonderburg (1583–1658) | | | | George Ernest of Limburg-Stirum (1593–1661) ⚭ 1603; Magdalene of Bentheim-Tecklenburg (1591–1649) | | | |
| Parents | Henry of Nassau-Siegen (1611–1652) ⚭ 1646; Mary Magdalene of Limburg-Stirum (1632–1707) | | | | | | | |

== Sources ==
- Aßmann, Helmut & Menk, Friedhelm (1996). Auf den Spuren von Nassau und Oranien in Siegen (in German). Siegen: Gesellschaft für Stadtmarketing Siegen e.V.
- Behr, Kamill (1854). Genealogie der in Europa regierenden Fürstenhäuser (in German). Leipzig: Verlag von Bernhard Tauchnitz.
- Blok, P.J. (1911). "Frederik Hendrik, 2 Friedrich Heinrich". In Molhuysen, P.C. & Blok, P.J. (eds.). Nieuw Nederlandsch Biografisch Woordenboek (in Dutch). Vol. Eerste deel. Leiden: A.W. Sijthoff. p. 902.
- Dek, A.W.E. (1962). Graf Johann der Mittlere von Nassau-Siegen und seine 25 Kinder (in German). Rijswijk: Krips Repro.
- Dek, A.W.E. (1968). "De afstammelingen van Juliana van Stolberg tot aan het jaar van de Vrede van Münster". Spiegel der Historie. Maandblad voor de geschiedenis der Nederlanden (in Dutch). 1968 (7/8): 228–303.
- Dek, A.W.E. (1970). Genealogie van het Vorstenhuis Nassau (in Dutch). Zaltbommel: Europese Bibliotheek.
- von Ehrenkrook, Hans Friedrich; Förster, Karl & Marchtaler, Kurt Erhard (1928). Ahnenreihen aus allen deutschen Gauen. Beilage zum Archiv für Sippenforschung und allen verwandten Gebieten (in German). Görlitz: Verlag für Sippenforschung und Wappenkunde C.A. Starke.
- Huberty, Michel; Giraud, Alain & Magdelaine, F. & B. (1981). l'Allemagne Dynastique (in French). Vol. Tome III: Brunswick-Nassau-Schwarzbourg. Le Perreux: Alain Giraud.
- Huberty, Michel; Giraud, Alain & Magdelaine, F. & B. (1994). l'Allemagne Dynastique (in French). Vol. Tome VII: Oldenbourg-Familles alliées H-L. Le Perreux-sur-Marne: Alain Giraud.
- Lück, Alfred (1981) [1967]. Siegerland und Nederland (in German) (2nd ed.). Siegen: Siegerländer Heimatverein e.V.
- Lück, Alfred & Wunderlich, Hermann (1956) [1952]. Die Fürstengruft zu Siegen (in German). Siegen: Verkehrsverein Siegen e.V.
- Menk, Friedhelm (1971). Quellen zur Geschichte des Siegerlandes im niederländischen königlichen Hausarchiv (in German). Siegen: Stadt Siegen/Forschungsstelle Siegerland.
- Menk, Friedhelm (2004). "Die Fürstengruft zu Siegen und die darin von 1669 bis 1781 erfolgten Beisetzungen". In Burwitz, Ludwig; Menk, Friedhelm; Opfermann, Ulrich Friedrich; Pfau, Dieter & Plaum, Bernd D. (eds.). Siegener Beiträge. Jahrbuch für regionale Geschichte (in German). Vol. 9. Siegen: Geschichtswerkstatt Siegen – Arbeitskreis für Regionalgeschichte e.V. pp. 183–202. ISSN 1431-6684.
- Textor von Haiger, Johann (1617). Nassauische Chronik (in German). Herborn: Christoph Raab.
- Vorsterman van Oyen, A.A. (1882). Het vorstenhuis Oranje-Nassau. Van de vroegste tijden tot heden (in Dutch). Leiden/Utrecht: A.W. Sijthoff/J.L. Beijers.
