= William Maurice, Prince of Nassau-Siegen =

German reigning prince (1649–1691)

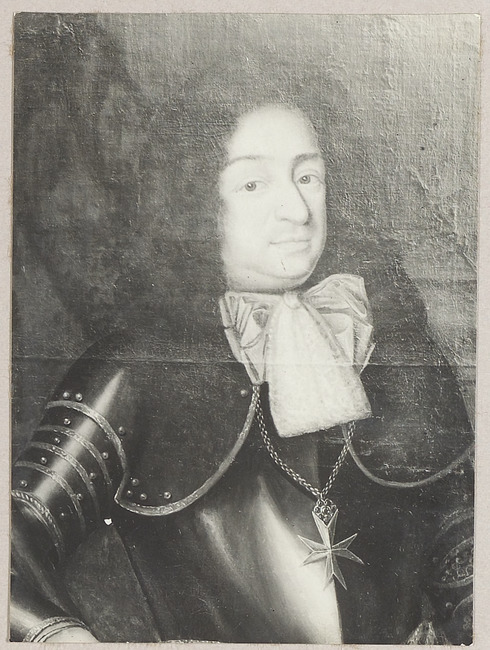
- Fürst William Maurice of Nassau-Siegen. Anonymous portrait, ca. 1690. Siegerlandmuseum, Siegen.

Fürst of Nassau-Siegen
- Coat of arms
- Reign: 1679–1691
- Predecessor: John Maurice
- Successor: Frederick William Adolf
- Full name: William Maurice Prince of Nassau-Siegen
- Native name: Wilhelm Moritz Fürst von Nassau-Siegen
- Born: Wilhelm Moritz Graf zu Nassau, Katzenelnbogen, Vianden und Diez, Herr zu Beilstein; 18/28 January 1649; Wisch Castle, Terborg
- Died: 23 January 1691^{Jul.} Nassauischer Hof, Siegen
- Buried: 12 March 1691; Fürstengruft, Siegen
- Noble family: House of Nassau-Siegen
- Spouse: Ernestine Charlotte of Nassau-Schaumburg
- Issue Detail: Frederick William Adolf
- Father: Henry of Nassau-Siegen
- Mother: Mary Magdalene of Limburg-Stirum
- Occupation: Hopman of a company of Swiss soldiers in the Dutch States Army 1663, lieutenant colonel of an infantry regiment 1672, colonel 1673, ritmeester of a cavalry company 1678

Prince William Maurice of Nassau-Siegen (18/28 January 1649 – 23 January 1691^{Jul.}), German: Wilhelm Moritz Fürst von Nassau-Siegen, official titles: Fürst zu Nassau, Graf zu Katzenelnbogen, Vianden, Diez, Limburg und Bronkhorst, Herr zu Beilstein, Stirum, Wisch, Borculo, Lichtenvoorde und Wildenborch, Erbbannerherr des Herzogtums Geldern und der Grafschaft Zutphen, was a count from the House of Nassau-Siegen, a cadet branch of the Ottonian Line of the House of Nassau. He served as an officer in the Dutch States Army. In 1664, he was elevated to the rank and title of prince. In 1679, he became Fürst of Nassau-Siegen, a part of the County of Nassau.

William Maurice is described as a man of integrity, but not a man of above-average talent.

== Biography ==
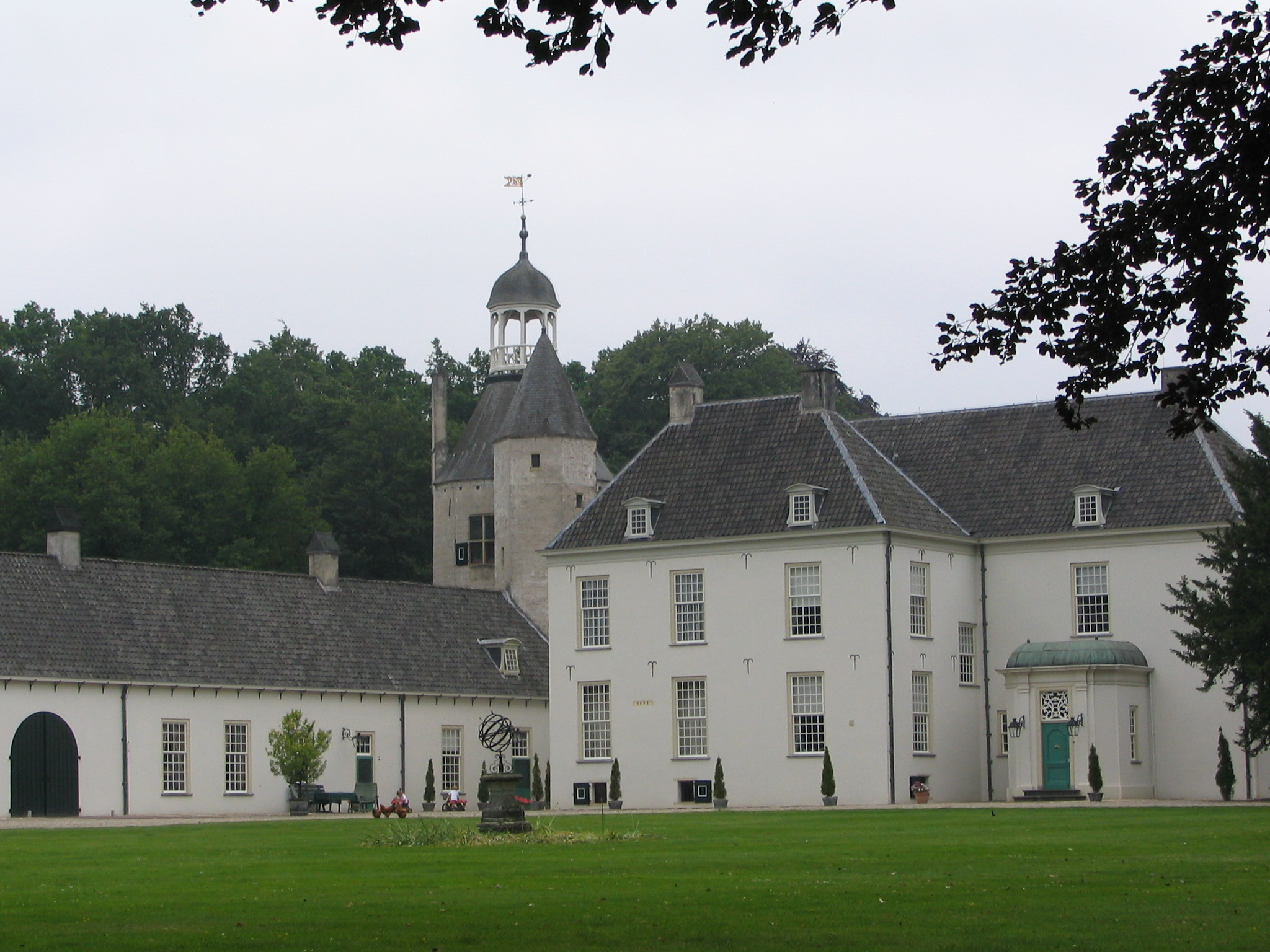
Wisch Castle in Terborg, 2004.

William Maurice was born at Wisch Castle in Terborg on 18/28 January 1649 (Note: "See the baptismal register of Terborg: the 18th, at three o'clock in the afternoon." Menk (2004), p. 195 mentions the date 6 May 1649.) as the eldest son of Count Henry of Nassau-Siegen and Countess Mary Magdalene of Limburg-Stirum. After the death of their father, William Maurice and his brother Frederick Henry were adopted by their uncle Fürst John Maurice of Nassau-Siegen.

After the death of his maternal grandfather, Count George Ernest of Limburg-Stirum, in September 1661, William Maurice succeeded him as count of Bronkhorst, lord of Wisch, Borculo, Lichtenvoorde and Wildenborch, and hereditary knight banneret of the Duchy of Guelders and the County of Zutphen. Thus, these properties came into the possession of the House of Nassau.

On 29 April 1663, William Maurice became a hopman of a company of Swiss soldiers in the Dutch States Army. On 20 April 1672 he became lieutenant colonel of an infantry regiment and in 1673 he was promoted to colonel. In 1678 he also became ritmeester of a cavalry company to the repartition (Note: Through the system of repartition, the provinces of the Dutch Republic paid for the troops assigned to them.) of Friesland.

William Maurice and his brother Frederick Henry accompanied their uncle and adoptive father John Maurice on his journey to the city of Siegen, where they arrived on 21/31 August 1663. On 7 January 1664, the two brothers were inaugurated in the town hall of Siegen, where they confirmed the city privileges and liberties. Both brothers were elevated into the Reichsfürstenstand on 6 May 1664.

In 1667 William Maurice became a knight of the Order of Saint John (Bailiwick of Brandenburg, Saxony, Pomerania and Wendland) in Sonnenburg and commander of Grüneberg, and also a knight of the Teutonic Order (Bailiwick of Utrecht) and commander of Tiel.

In October 1672, William Maurice came to the aid of his uncle John Maurice to defend Muiden in the Franco-Dutch War, with a company of soldiers "geworben in dem deutschen Stammlanden des Fürsten", i.e. recruited in Nassau-Siegen.

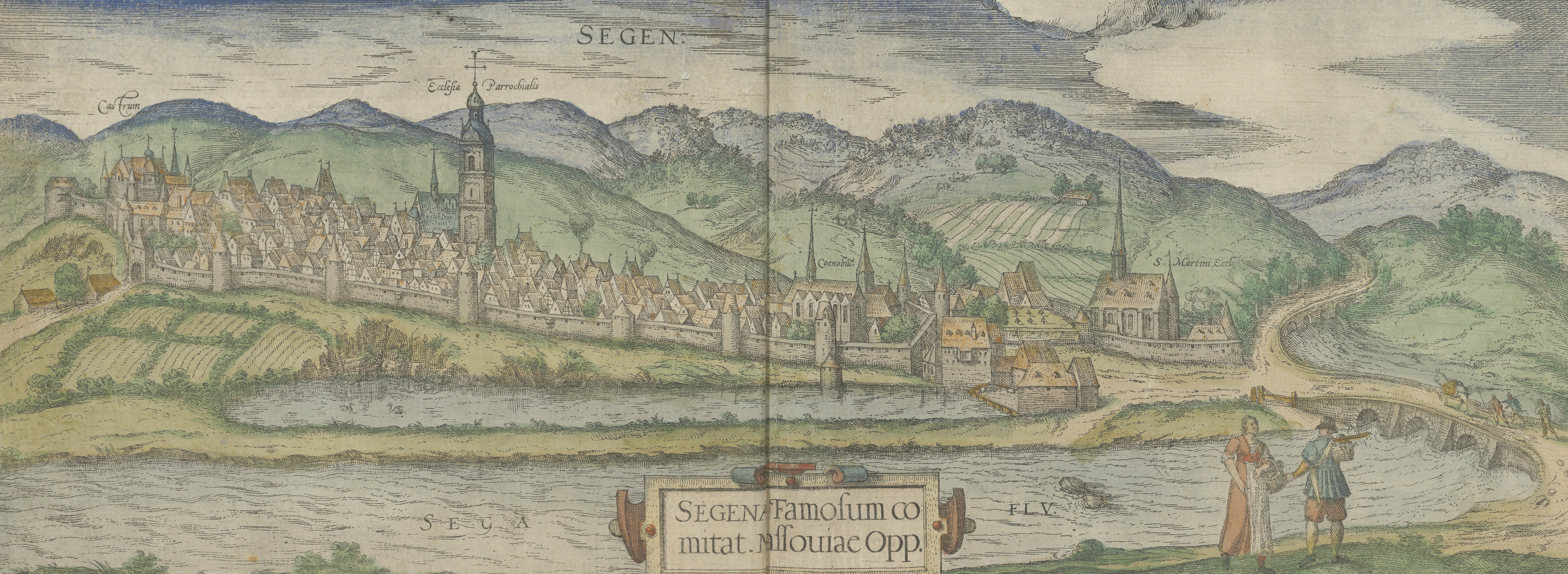
Siegen in 1617. From Braun & Hogenberg, Civitates orbis terrarum Band 6, Cologne, 1617. In the middle (under the word Coenobiu) the St. John's Church of the former monastery, which buildings were the Residenz of the Protestant Fürsten of Nassau-Siegen with the name Nassauischer Hof. Left from the center the St. Nicholas Church.

In 1678, William Maurice was appointed co-regent by John Maurice. A year later, John Maurice died and William Maurice succeeded him as the territorial lord of the Protestant part of the principality of Nassau-Siegen and co-ruler of the city of Siegen. He possessed the district of Siegen (with the exception of seven villages) and the districts of Hilchenbach and Freudenberg. He shared the city of Siegen with his second cousin, John Francis Desideratus, the Catholic Fürst of Nassau-Siegen. During his reign, William Maurice had the Nassauischer Hof, the Residenz of the Protestant princes of Nassau-Siegen in the city of Siegen, extended. In 1690, he had the members of his dynasty, who had been buried in the St. Nicholas Church in Siegen, transferred to the Fürstengruft there.

William Maurice died in the Nassauischer Hof in Siegen on 23 January 1691^{Jul.}, (Note: "See notification of death (State Archives Marburg 115, Waldeck, 2, Nassau, 339) from Siegen 24‑1‑1691: «gestern Freytag den 23. dieses (therefore old style) abendts zwischen 5 und 6 Uhren»." Menk (2004), p. 195 mentions the date 18/28 January 1691.) and was buried in the Fürstengruft there on 12 March. He was succeeded by his son Frederick William Adolf, who was under the custody and regency of his mother until 1701.

== Marriage and issue ==
William Maurice married at Schaumburg Castle on 6 February 1678^{Jul.} (Note: "In the parish records of Terborg it is stated that the marriage took place in Schaumburg («in arce Schaumburgenei»). See the marriage announcement (State Archives Marburg 4f, Nassau-Siegen, 203) at Schaumburg 10‑2 old style: «den 6 dieses … das fürstl. Beylager gehalten». Dek (1962) and Europäische Stammtafeln mention 6‑1‑1678; that is the engagement date (see the notification in State Archives Marburg 4f, Nassau-Siegen 203). Dek (1970) no longer gives a place and date of marriage, but only mentions that the announcement was made in Lichtenvoorde on 3‑2‑1678.") to Princess Ernestine Charlotte of Nassau-Schaumburg (Schaumburg Castle, 20 May 1662^{Jul.} (Note: "See State Archives Wiesbaden (170^{III}) several birth notifications dated Schaumburg 21/31 May 1662: «gestern den 20/30ten diesses, des Abends zwischen 8 und 9 Uhren».") – Nassauischer Hof, Siegen, 21 February 1732 (Note: "See State Archives Wiesbaden (170^{III}) notification of death dated Siegen 23‑2‑1732: «vorgestern Mittag zwischen 11 und 12 Uhren in dem 70ten Jahres ihres Alters». See also the parish records of Siegen. Europäische Stammtafeln I, 117 and 118 states the fantasised dates 21‑2‑1714 and 19‑10‑1714 respectively.")), the second daughter of Prince Adolf of Nassau-Schaumburg and Elisabeth Charlotte Melander, Countess of Holzappel.

From the marriage of William Maurice and Ernestine Charlotte the following children were born:

1. Fürst Frederick William Adolf (Note: "In almost all official documents he is mentioned with these three given names, but sometimes only Frederick William (see for instance Menk (1971), p. 89). Dek (1970) names him Frederik Willem I Adolf; Europäische Stammtafeln on the other hand, mentions him as Adolf in its table Nassau-Siegen (band I, 117), while in other places he mentions him under the double given name Friedrich Wilhelm, which causes some confusion among readers.") (Nassauischer Hof, Siegen, 20 February 1680 – Nassauischer Hof, Siegen, 13 February 1722), succeeded his father in 1691. Married:
  1. at Homburg Castle on 7 January 1702 (Note: "Although the marriage announcement (State Archives Marburg 4f, Nassau-Siegen, Nr. 241), dated Siegen 12‑1‑1702 says that it was «den 6 hujus mittelst christgewöhnlicher Einsegnung und Beilager vollzogen» (without mentioning the place), we have taken the 7th, just like Knetsch (1931), according to the register of the reformed parish of Homburg: «Ao 1702 den 7 Januarii ist der Durchlachtigste Fürst Friedrich Wilhelm Adolph zu Nassau-Siegen mit der Durchl. Princesse Elisabetha Juliana Francisca Landgräfin zu Hessen Homburg alhier zu Homburg auf dem festen Schloss ehelich vermählet worden». Likewise, the personal details in the printed funeral sermon: «und darauff noch den 7 Januarii zu Homburg in der Hochfürstl. Schloss Kirche nach erfolgter Priestlichen Copulation Dero Hochfürstl. … Beylager gehalten» and the personalia preserved in the Royal House Archive of the Netherlands (IV/1561): «den 7 Januar 1702 zu Homburg a.d.H. vermittelst Priestlicher Copulation». We found 6‑1 in Dek (1962), Europäische Stammtafeln I, 117, Vorsterman van Oyen (1882), and 7‑1 in Europäische Stammtafeln I, 106 and Knetsch (1931).") to Landgravine Elisabeth Juliana Francisca of Hesse-Homburg (Homburg Castle, 6 January 1681 (Note: "Europäische Stammtafeln I, 117 states, incorrectly, 6‑2‑1681. The actual date is 6‑1‑1681 (see Europäische Stammtafeln I, 106, Knetsch (1931), Dek (1962), Dek (1970) and zu Stolberg-Stolberg & von Arnswaldt), confirmed by the parish records of Homburg, which state that she was born on 6‑1, between eight and nine o'clock in the evening and was baptised on 13‑1.") – Nassauischer Hof, Siegen, 12 November 1707).
  2. at the Old Castle in Bayreuth on 13 April 1708 (Note: "Although Dek (1962) and Dek (1970) place the marriage in Bayreuth on 20‑4‑1708 (date confirmed by Europäische Stammtafeln I, 117, Europäische Stammtafeln II, 88 and Knetsch (1931)), we find in the marriage contract that was signed in Siegen on 6‑8‑1708: «solches durch das Fürstliche Beylager mit öffentlichen und gewöhnlichen Christfürstlichen Ceremonien den 13. April des noch laufenden 1708 Jahres in der Fürstlichen Residenz zu Bayreuth vollzogen». The date 13 April is confirmed by the notification of the marriage (see State Archives Marburg 4f, Nassau-Siegen N. 241), dated Bayreuth 18‑4‑1708: «den 13. Aprilis allhier zu Bayreuth … durch würklich gehaltenes Beylager». See also in the Royal House Archive of the Netherlands (IV/1561), personalia: «den 13. April 1708 dero christfürstl. Beylager in Bayreuth». The registers of the Hofkirche in Bayreuth have disappeared.") to Duchess Amalie Louise of Courland (Mitau, 23 July 1687 (Note: "Although Dek (1970) and Europäische Stammtafeln I, 117 and II, 88 say that she was born on 27‑7‑1687, we could establish that the birth took place in Mitau on the 23rd. Indeed, the notification that the Duke of Courland sent from Mitau on 24‑7‑1687 announces the birth of a daughter «gestern morgens» (see State Archives Wiesbaden 170^{III}).") – Untere Schloss, Siegen, 18 January 1750).
2. Charles Louis Henry (Nassauischer Hof, Siegen, 17 March 1682^{Jul.} (Note: "See the registers of the Reformed Church of Siegen 1682: «getauft Domin. Lætare», without mentioning the date of birth. See State Archives Marburg (4f. Nassau-Siegen Nr. 203), notification dated 21‑3‑1682 «den 17 dieses», invitation for baptism «nächstkünftigen Sonntag». See Royal House Archive of the Netherlands (IV/1527), Personalia: «geb. den 17. März 1682, getauft 26 März» (which was indeed a Sunday in the old calendar). See State Archives Marburg (115, Waldeck 2, Nr. 338), notification dated Siegen 21‑3‑1682: «den 17. dieses nachts zw. 1 u. 2 Uhren», from which we can deduce without the risk of error that the birth took place in Siegen on 17‑3‑1682, old style.") – Nassauischer Hof, Siegen, 18 October 1694^{Jul.} (Note: "See State Archives Wiesbaden (130^{II} 2380^{III} e), notification from Siegen on 20‑10‑1694: «Donnerstag den 18. dieses Monaths», therefore old style.")), was hopman of the company of Swiss soldiers in the Dutch States Army, that had been his father's, since 1691.

== Ancestors ==
Ancestors of William Maurice, Prince of Nassau-Siegen
Great-great-grandparents	William I 'the Rich' of Nassau-Siegen (1487–1559) ⚭ 1531; Juliane of Stolberg-Wernigerode (1506–1580)	George III of Leuchtenberg (1502–1555) ⚭ 1528; Barbara of Brandenburg-Ansbach (1495–1552)	Christian III of Denmark (1503–1559) ⚭ 1525; Dorothea of Saxe-Lauenburg (1511–1571)	Ernest V of Brunswick-Grubenhagen (1518–1567) ⚭ 1547; Margaret of Pomerania (1518–1569)	Herman George of Limburg-Stirum (1540–1574) ⚭ 1557; Mary of Hoya (1534–1612)	Otto IV of Holstein-Schauenburg-Pinneberg (ca. 1517–1576) ⚭ 1558; Elisabeth Ursula of Brunswick-Lüneburg (1539–1586)	Eberwin III of Bentheim-Steinfurt (1536–1562) ⚭ 1553; Anna of Tecklenburg-Schwerin (1532–1582)	Gumprecht II of Neuenahr-Alpen (ca. 1503–1555) ⚭ 1542; Amöna of Daun-Falkenstein (ca. 1520–ca. 1582)
Great-grandparents	John VI 'the Elder' of Nassau-Siegen (1536–1606) ⚭ 1559; Elisabeth of Leuchtenberg (1537–1579)		John 'the Younger' of Schleswig-Holstein-Sonderburg (1545–1622) ⚭ 1568; Elisabeth of Brunswick-Grubenhagen (1550–1586)		Jobst of Limburg-Stirum (1560–1621) ⚭ 1591; Mary of Holstein-Schauenburg-Pinneberg (1559–1616)		Arnold IV of Bentheim-Tecklenburg (1554–1606) ⚭ 1573; Magdalena of Neuenahr-Alpen (1553–1627)	
Grandparents	John VII 'the Middle' of Nassau-Siegen (1561–1623) ⚭ 1603; Margaret of Schleswig-Holstein-Sonderburg (1583–1658)				George Ernest of Limburg-Stirum (1593–1661) ⚭ 1603; Magdalene of Bentheim-Tecklenburg (1591–1649)			
Parents	Henry of Nassau-Siegen (1611–1652) ⚭ 1646; Mary Magdalene of Limburg-Stirum (1632–1707)							

== Sources ==
- Aßmann, Helmut & Menk, Friedhelm (1996). Auf den Spuren von Nassau und Oranien in Siegen (in German). Siegen: Gesellschaft für Stadtmarketing Siegen e.V.
- Behr, Kamill (1854). Genealogie der in Europa regierenden Fürstenhäuser (in German). Leipzig: Verlag von Bernhard Tauchnitz.
- Blok, P.J. (1911). "Willem Maurits, Wilhelm Moritz". In Molhuysen, P.C. & Blok, P.J. (eds.). Nieuw Nederlandsch Biografisch Woordenboek (in Dutch). Vol. Eerste deel. Leiden: A.W. Sijthoff. p. 1578.
- Dek, A.W.E. (1962). Graf Johann der Mittlere von Nassau-Siegen und seine 25 Kinder (in German). Rijswijk: Krips Repro.
- Dek, A.W.E. (1968). "De afstammelingen van Juliana van Stolberg tot aan het jaar van de Vrede van Münster". Spiegel der Historie. Maandblad voor de geschiedenis der Nederlanden (in Dutch). 1968 (7/8): 228–303.
- Dek, A.W.E. (1970). Genealogie van het Vorstenhuis Nassau (in Dutch). Zaltbommel: Europese Bibliotheek.
- von Ehrenkrook, Hans Friedrich; Förster, Karl & Marchtaler, Kurt Erhard (1928). Ahnenreihen aus allen deutschen Gauen. Beilage zum Archiv für Sippenforschung und allen verwandten Gebieten (in German). Görlitz: Verlag für Sippenforschung und Wappenkunde C.A. Starke.
- Huberty, Michel; Giraud, Alain & Magdelaine, F. & B. (1981). l'Allemagne Dynastique (in French). Vol. Tome III: Brunswick-Nassau-Schwarzbourg. Le Perreux: Alain Giraud.
- Huberty, Michel; Giraud, Alain & Magdelaine, F. & B. (1994). l'Allemagne Dynastique (in French). Vol. Tome VII: Oldenbourg-Familles alliées H-L. Le Perreux-sur-Marne: Alain Giraud.
- Knetsch, Carl (1931). Das Haus Brabant. Genealogie der Herzoge von Brabant und der Landgrafen von Hessen (in German). Vol. II. Teil: Die Nachkommen Philipps des Grossmütigen. Darmstadt: Historischer Verein für das Großherzogtum Hessen.
- Lück, Alfred (1981) [1967]. Siegerland und Nederland (in German) (2nd ed.). Siegen: Siegerländer Heimatverein e.V.
- Lück, Alfred & Wunderlich, Hermann (1956) [1952]. Die Fürstengruft zu Siegen (in German). Siegen: Verkehrsverein Siegen e.V.
- Menk, Friedhelm (1971). Quellen zur Geschichte des Siegerlandes im niederländischen königlichen Hausarchiv (in German). Siegen: Stadt Siegen/Forschungsstelle Siegerland.
- Menk, Friedhelm (2004). "Die Fürstengruft zu Siegen und die darin von 1669 bis 1781 erfolgten Beisetzungen". In Burwitz, Ludwig; Menk, Friedhelm; Opfermann, Ulrich Friedrich; Pfau, Dieter & Plaum, Bernd D. (eds.). Siegener Beiträge. Jahrbuch für regionale Geschichte (in German). Vol. 9. Siegen: Geschichtswerkstatt Siegen – Arbeitskreis für Regionalgeschichte e.V. pp. 183–202. ISSN 1431-6684.
- Gräfin zu Stolberg-Stolberg, Sophie Eleonore & von Arnswaldt, Werner Konstantin (1927–1935). Katalog der fürstlich Stolberg-Stolberg'schen Leichenpredigten-Sammlung (in German). Leipzig: Verlag Degener & Co.
- Textor von Haiger, Johann (1617). Nassauische Chronik (in German). Herborn: Christoph Raab.
- Vorsterman van Oyen, A.A. (1882). Het vorstenhuis Oranje-Nassau. Van de vroegste tijden tot heden (in Dutch). Leiden/Utrecht: A.W. Sijthoff/J.L. Beijers.

William Maurice, Prince of Nassau-Siegen House of Nassau-Siegen (Protestant branch) Born: 18/28 January 1649 Died: 23 January 1691^{Jul.}
Regnal titles
Preceded by George Ernest of Limburg-Stirum	Count of Bronkhorst, Lord of Wisch, Borculo, Lichtenvoorde and Wildenborch, Hereditary Knight Banneret of the Duchy of Guelders and the County of Zutphen; September 1661 – 23 January 1691^{Jul.}	Succeeded by Frederick William Adolf of Nassau-Siegen
Preceded by John Maurice	Fürst of Nassau-Siegen; 10/20 December 1679 – 23 January 1691^{Jul.}	Succeeded by Frederick William Adolf
