= Adolf III =

Adolf III may refer to:

- Adolf III of Berg, count of Berg from 1093 until 1132
- Adolf III of Holstein (1160–1225)
- Adolf III of the Marck (1334–1394)
- Adolf III of Nassau (c. 1423–1475)
- Adolf III of Nassau-Wiesbaden-Idstein (1443–1511)
- Adolf III of Schauenburg (1511–1556)
