= Henry of Nassau-Siegen (1611–1652) =

German count, officer in the Dutch Army, diplomat for the Dutch Republic (1611–1652)

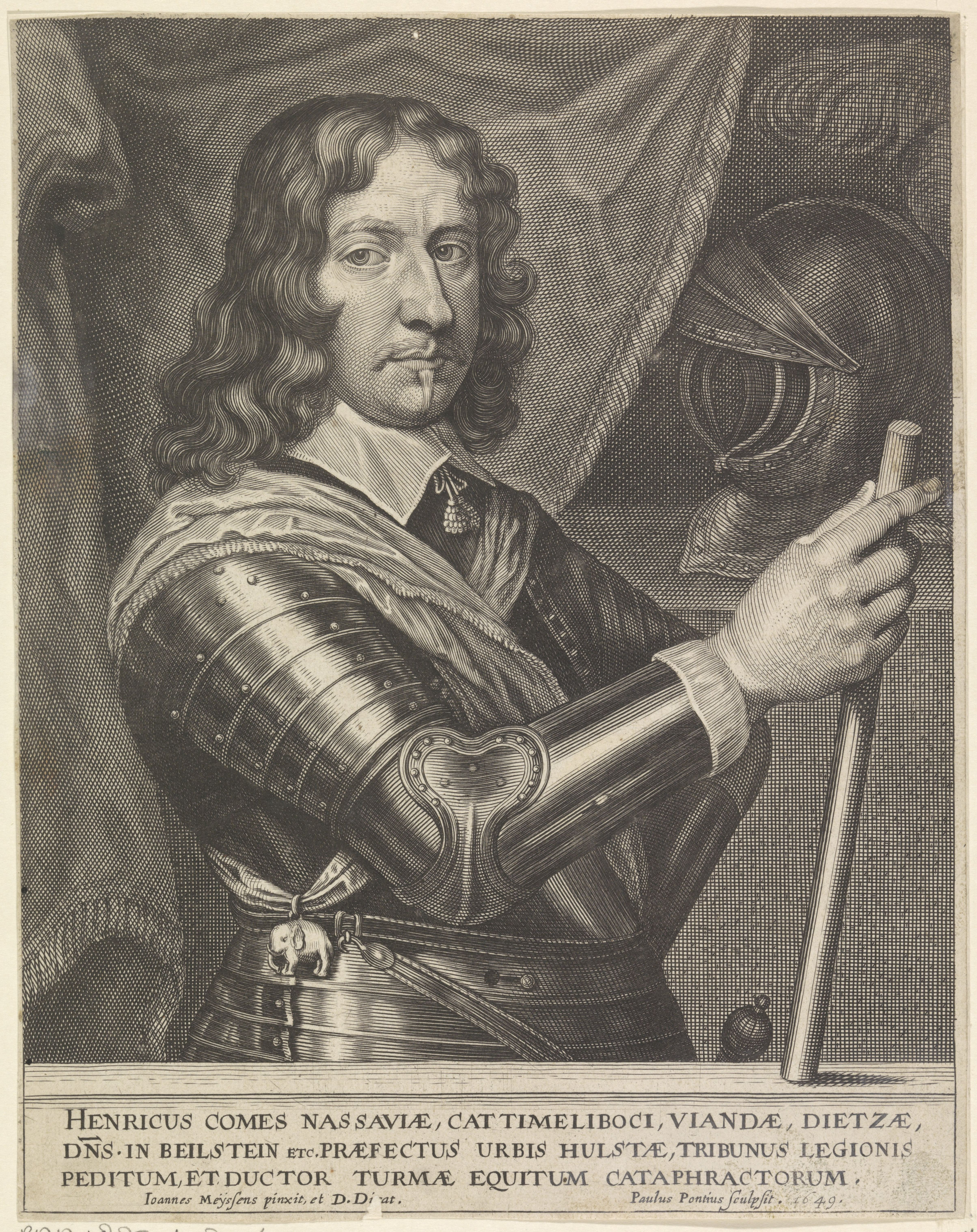
- Count Henry of Nassau-Siegen. Print by Paulus Pontius after a painting by Joannes Meyssens. Rijksmuseum Amsterdam.

- Coat of arms
- Full name: Henry Count of Nassau-Siegen
- Native name: Heinrich Graf von Nassau-Siegen
- Born: Heinrich Graf zu Nassau, Katzenelnbogen, Vianden und Diez, Herr zu Beilstein; 9 August 1611; Siegen Castle
- Baptised: 29 September 1611; Siegen Castle
- Died: 7 November 1652 (aged 41); Hulst
- Buried: Terborg reburied: 17 July 1669 in the Fürstengruft, Siegen
- Noble family: House of Nassau-Siegen
- Spouse: Mary Magdalene of Limburg-Stirum
- Issue Detail: William Maurice; Sophie Amalie; Frederick Henry
- Father: John VII 'the Middle' of Nassau-Siegen
- Mother: Margaret of Schleswig-Holstein-Sonderburg
- Occupation: Captain of the infantry in the Dutch States Army 1632, lieutenant colonel 1636, colonel 1647, governor of Hulst 1645–1652, diplomat for the Dutch Republic.

Count Henry of Nassau-Siegen (9 August 1611 – 27 October/7 November 1652), German: Heinrich Graf von Nassau-Siegen, official titles: Graf zu Nassau, Katzenelnbogen, Vianden und Diez, Herr zu Beilstein, was a count from the House of Nassau-Siegen, a cadet branch of the Ottonian Line of the House of Nassau. He served the Republic of the United Netherlands in diplomatic missions, as an officer in the Dutch States Army, and as governor of Hulst.

== Biography ==
Henry was born at Siegen Castle on 9 August 1611 (Note: "From Siegen, on 9-8-1611, John 'the Middle' announced the birth of a son «heute zwischen vier und fünf Uhren vormittags». See State Archives Marburg (115, Waldeck 2, Nassau 337). See also a letter from John 'the Middle' dated Siegen 16‑8‑1611: «den 9. dieses» (State Archives Wiesbaden 170^{III}, Korrespondenzen) and, under the same number: «Ordnung für den Ablaufder Kindtaufe auf dem Schloss (zu Siegen) Heinrich Gf. zu Nassau» (born in Siegen 9‑8‑1611, baptised Siegen, 29 Sept. 1611), Siegen, 29‑9‑1611.") as the fourth son of Count John VII 'the Middle' of Nassau-Siegen and his second wife, Duchess Margaret of Schleswig-Holstein-Sonderburg. He was baptised on 29 September, also at Siegen Castle. He was educated at the court of the Electoral Palatinate in Heidelberg and the Bohemian court in Prague. With the 'Winter King' (Elector Frederick V of the Palatinate, King of Bohemia) Henry fled from Prague to The Hague and studied with the King's eldest son Frederick Henry at Leiden University since 14 September 1623.

=== In service of the Dutch Republic ===
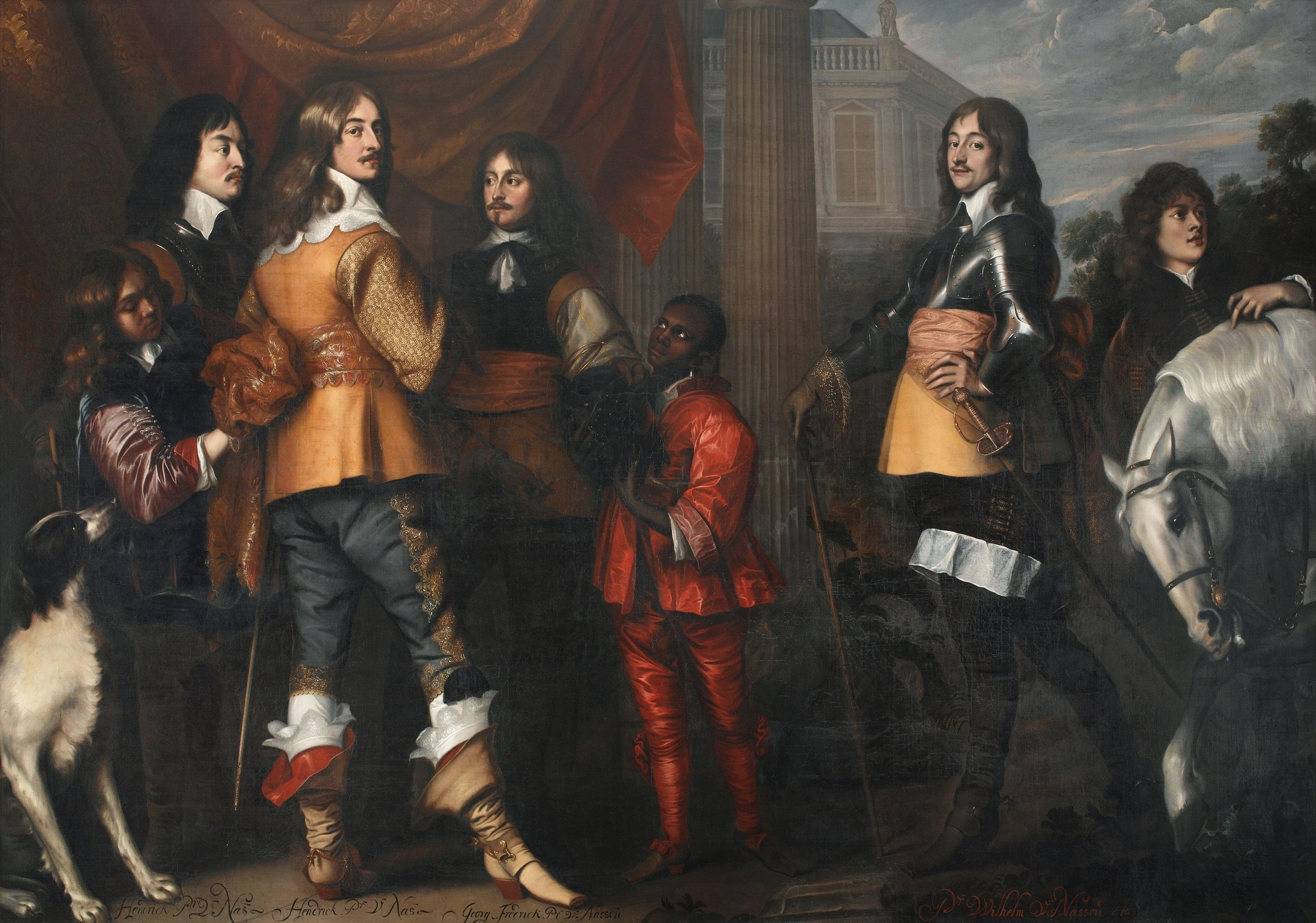
Group portrait of four counts of Nassau by Adriaen Hanneman, 1660–1669. Stadhouderlijk Hof, Leeuwarden. From left: Henry of Nassau-Siegen, Henry Casimir I of Nassau-Diez, George Frederik of Nassau-Siegen, William Frederick of Nassau-Diez.

Henry became captain of a infantry company in the Dutch States Army on 27 November 1632. On 2 January 1636 he became lieutenant colonel and on 23 March 1647 colonel of the Northern Holland regiment. On 20 April 1640 he also became ritmeester. In the Eighty Years' War he distinguished himself at the Siege of Gennep in 1641 and in the Rijk van Nijmegen. He was governor of Hulst since 1645.

The Dutch Republic repeatedly called on Henry for diplomatic missions. In 1638, in Paris he delivered the congratulations of the States General of the Netherlands on the occasion of the birth of the Dauphin of France (later King Louis XIV), and requested King Louis XIII on behalf of Prince Frederick Henry of Orange to stand as godparent at the baptism of the latter's son Henry Louis.

In 1643 Henry travelled to Scandinavia. In February he attended the marriage of Count Oxenstierna (a cousin of the Swedish Lord High Chancellor Axel Oxenstierna) in Stockholm. At the court of Queen Christina of Sweden, Henry met his sister Amalia and her husband, field marshal Herman Wrangel af Salmis, governor of Livonia. With a large entourage, Henry travelled to Danzig and Warsaw and returned to the Dutch Republic via Vienna. The purpose of this diplomatic journey has remained unknown. (Note: Blok (1911), p. 1075 therefore speaks of a mysterious journey to the Nordic realms, Poland and Austria.) But from a letter it is known that King Władysław IV of Poland, despite his distrust of everything that came from Prince Frederick Henry of Orange, was pleased to have Henry at his court as a Dutch envoy.

In 1649 Henry undertook another journey to the Nordic countries, the purpose of which also remains unknown. This journey earned him the high honour of the Danish Order of the Elephant. The later scientist and inventor Christiaan Huygens, whose knowledge of the law in the Deensche saecke (Danish affairs) would be of use to Henry, accompanied him as a secretary. Huygens gave interesting accounts of Henry's experiences at the Danish royal court. The Danish-Norwegian Queen Sophia Amalia took on the sponsorship of Henry's daughter Sophia Amalia, born in 1650.

On behalf of the House of Nassau, Henry and his brothers John Maurice and George Frederick were witnesses at the marriage of Count William Frederick of Nassau-Diez, the stadtholder of Friesland, and Countess Albertine Agnes of Nassau in Kleve on 2 May 1652.

=== Succession dispute for the County of Nassau-Siegen ===
The third will and testament of Count John VII 'the Middle' of 1621 bequeathed John Maurice and his younger brothers from their father's second marriage the district of Freudenberg, some villages in the Haingericht (Note: "The Haingericht was certainly located around the castle of Hainchen, which passed with its dependencies to the House of Nassau in 1313. See Historische Stätten Deutschlands III, 245.") and a third part of the administration of the city of Siegen. For the eldest son from the first marriage, John 'the Younger', only one third of the county was provided for in this will. On 6 August 1621, he was informed of this, with a precise statement of the reasons that had led his father to take this step. On 9 May 1623, i.e. not until two years later, John 'the Younger' protested against this with a letter from Frankfurt to the councillors of Siegen. In the meantime he had not been idle and had not hesitated to denounce his father to the Emperor. At the time of his letter of protest he was certainly already aware of the Poenale mandatum cassatorium, which Emperor Ferdinand II officially issued some time later, on 27 June 1623, informing John 'the Middle' that at the time of making his third will as a fellow combatant of the outlawed 'Winter King' he was not entitled to make a will. He had to revoke it and answer to an imperial court within two months. It seems that John 'the Younger' then shrank from having the imperial decree delivered to his seriously ill father.

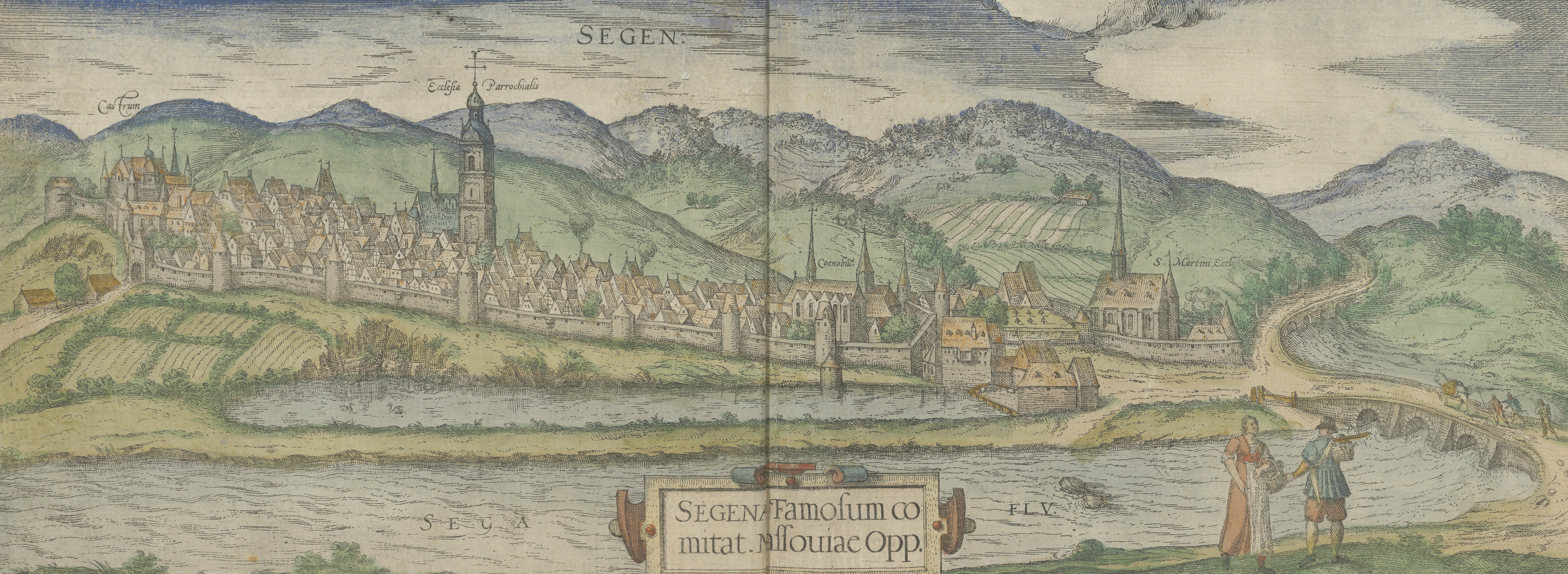
Siegen in 1617. From Braun & Hogenberg, Civitates orbis terrarum Band 6, Cologne, 1617. On the left Siegen Castle.

John 'the Middle' died at Siegen Castle on 27 September 1623. None of the three sons mentioned in the will were present at the death of their father. On 13 October William and John Maurice arrived in Siegen, and on 26 October John 'the Younger'. Everyone knew that there would be a dispute at the reading of the will on 11 December 1623. John 'the Younger' had the imperial decree read out, and when his brothers demurred, he said as he stood up: "Der Kaiser wird uns scheiden!" ("The Emperor will part us!"). He had taken the precaution of obtaining a further imperial decree on 20 November 1623 against Countess Dowager Margaret and her sons, in which the Emperor strictly forbade impeding John's assumption of government, his taking possession of the land and his inauguration. On 12 January 1624, John 'the Younger' was able to accept the homage from the town of Siegen but only because he beforehand had secretly let a squadron of selected horsemen into the town through the castle gate (that is, not through a city gate) in a heavy snowstorm, so that they could not be seen or heard by the town guards.

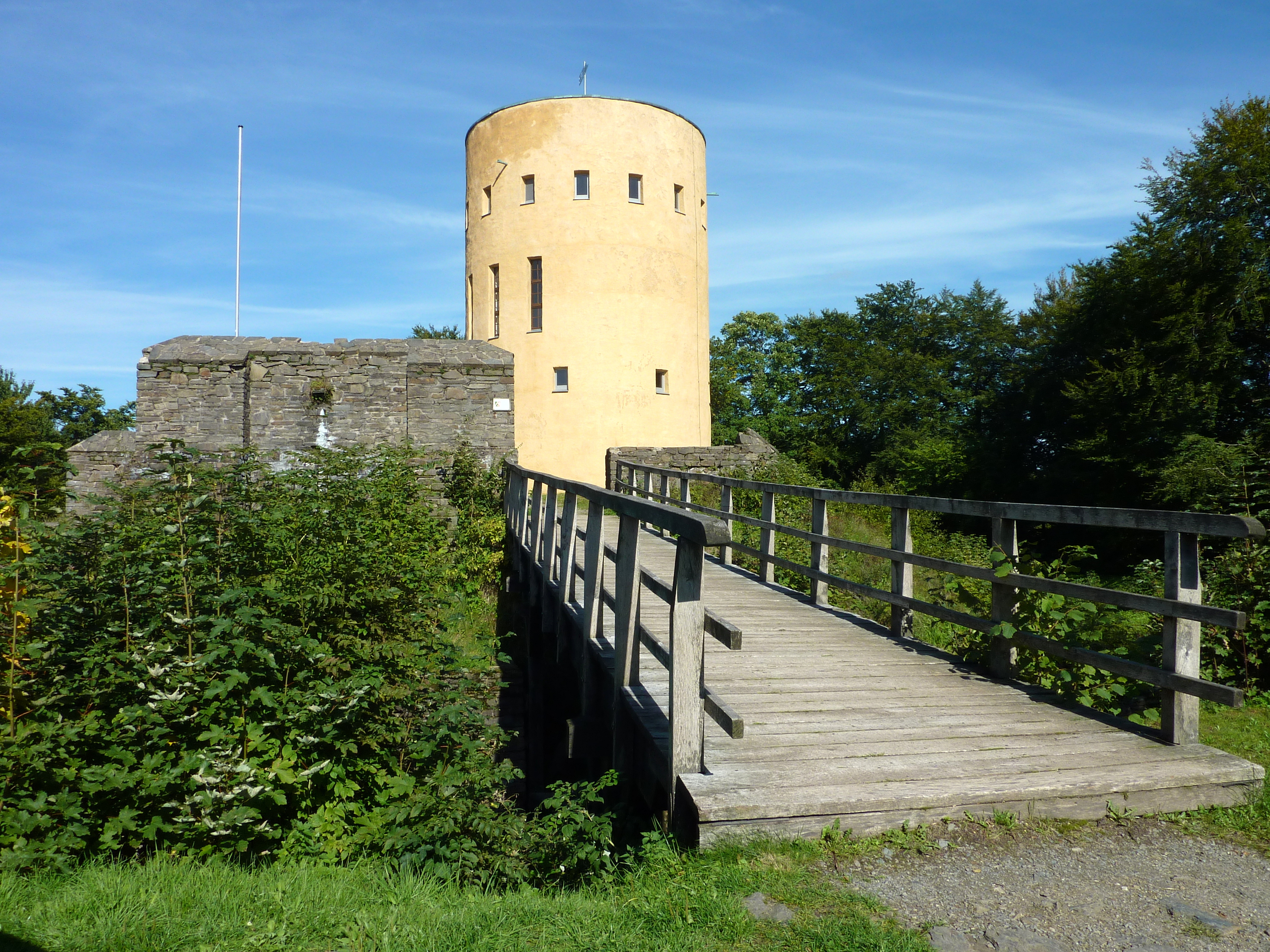
Ginsburg Castle. Photo: Frank Behnsen, 2010.

John 'the Younger' thus received the entire inheritance, and the provisions of the will made in favour of William and John Maurice remained a dead letter. However, on 13/23 January 1624, John 'the Younger' voluntarily ceded the sovereignty over the Hilchenbach district with Ginsburg Castle and some villages belonging to the Ferndorf and Netphen districts, to William. With the exception of John Maurice and George Frederick, the younger brothers accepted only modest appanages. Henceforth, until 1645, the county of Nassau-Siegen had two governments, one in Siegen, the other in Hilchenbach. However, for a short period (1632–1635) this situation underwent a temporary change: during the Thirty Years' War, his brothers, who were fighting on the Protestant side, rebelled against John 'the Younger'.

Count Louis Henry of Nassau-Dillenburg entered the service of King Gustavus II Adolphus of Sweden on 1 December 1631, who had landed in Germany on 24 June 1630 to intervene in favour of the Protestants in the Thirty Years' War. Countess Dowager Margaret, through the mediation of Louis Henry, turned to Gustavus Adolphus and asked for help against the machinations of her stepson John 'the Younger'. On 14 February 1632 the Swedish king sent an order from Frankfurt to Louis Henry to provide military support for his first cousin John Maurice. Louis Henry then occupied the city of Siegen with his regiment of Dutch and Swedish soldiers. One day later, on 29 February, John Maurice and his brother Henry arrived in Siegen. Just as John 'the Younger' had kept his cavalry in reserve eight years earlier, now John Maurice and Henry, supported by the presence of the Swedish regiment, negotiated with the citizens, who felt bound by the oath they had sworn to John 'the Younger'. On 4 March, after long and difficult negotiations, the citizens paid homage to John Maurice and Henry. John Maurice obtained for himself not only the Freudenberg district, which his father had intended for him in the will of 1621, but also Netphen, which had been intended for John 'the Younger' in the same will. William was not only confirmed in the possession of Hilchenbach, but also received Ferndorf and Krombach, as stipulated in his father's will. The city of Siegen paid homage to William and John Maurice only, who only in 1635 re-admitted their elder brother John 'the Younger' into co-sovereignty. However, the latter soon restored the old order: in 1636, he again became the sole owner of his father's property, with the exception of Hilchenbach, which he left to William, and he again governed the city of Siegen alone. John Maurice was again excluded from the county's sovereignty. However, in 1642 he inherited the territory from his brother William in accordance with his father's will.

John 'the Younger' died in Ronse on 27 July 1638. His only son John Francis Desideratus was born in Nozeroy on 28 July 1627. His mother acted as regent until his marriage in 1651. He made several attempts to obtain the whole Siegerland. In 1646 he visited the Emperor in Vienna to protest against his uncle John Maurice's seizure of the county. On 22 January 1645, after his return from Brazil, the latter, with his brothers George Frederick and Henry and an 80-man entourage, had forcibly occupied Siegen Castle and on 15 February had received the renewed homage from the citizens, albeit this time only for two thirds of the county. In order to end the constant dispute, John Maurice wanted to adhere strictly to his father's will of 1621 and leave his nephew John Francis Desideratus the one third that was due to him. Already before his departure to Brazil, on 25 October 1635, he had explicitly authorised his subjects to recognise the then still living John 'the Younger' as co-ruler. In 1645 John Maurice relinquished his rights to the Freudenberg district, granted by the will of 1621, in favour of his brother George Frederick. John Francis Desideratus was unsuccessful with the Emperor in Vienna, and two years later, at the Congress of Westphalia, Emperor Ferdinand III ratified the fiercely contested 1621 will of John 'the Middle'. This left John Francis Desideratus only the Catholic third part, which is still known today as Johannland. John Maurice held both the other thirds in his hand, because his brother William had already died and left him his third part, and George Frederick had ceded all his rights to John Maurice in 1649. It was therefore the latter who continued to administer the Freudenberg district.

=== Death, burial and reburial ===
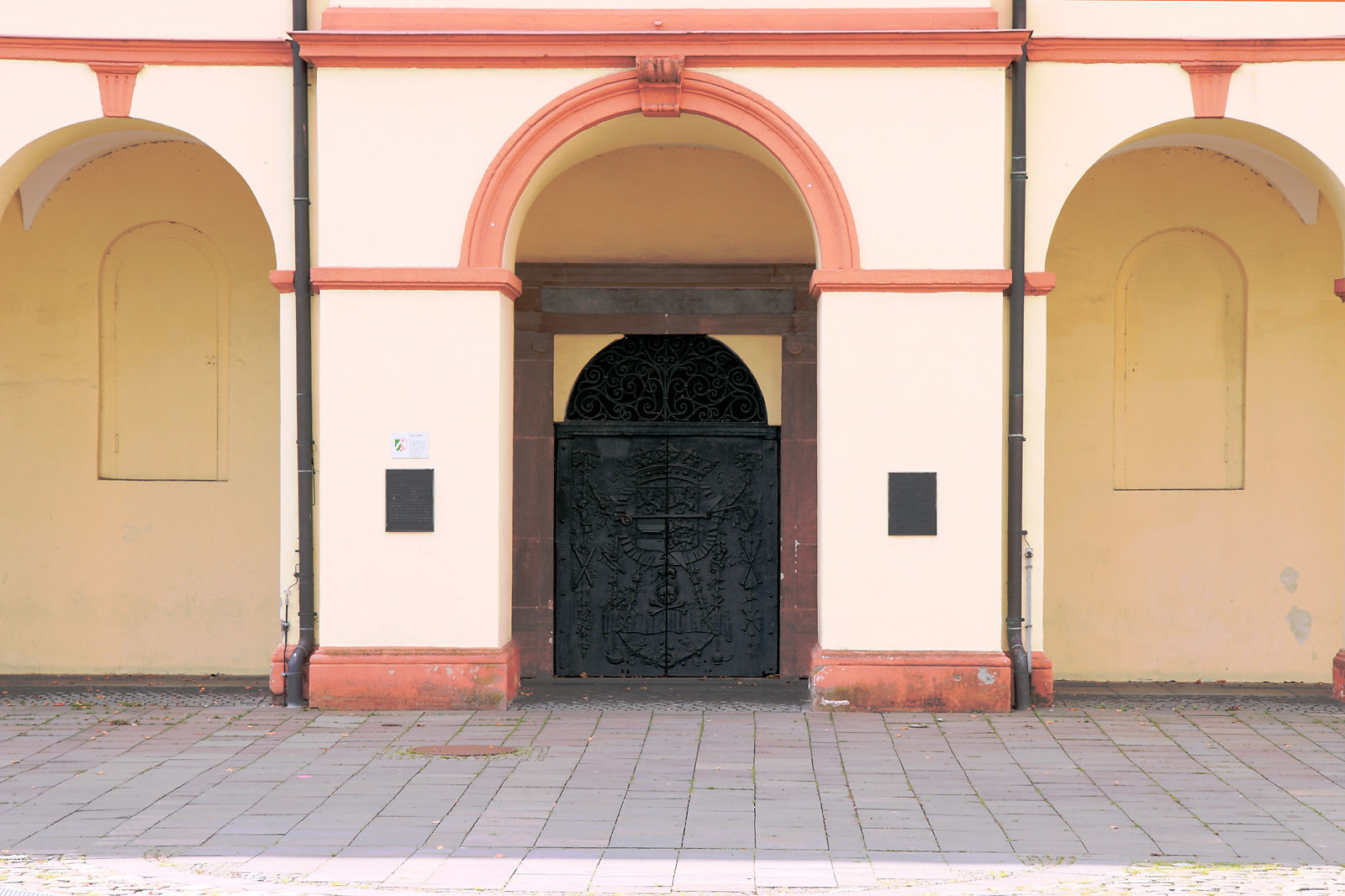
The entrance to the Fürstengruft in Siegen. Photo: Bob Ionescu, 2009.

Henry died in Hulst on 27 October/7 November 1652. (Note: "The genealogists usually say that he died on 27-10-1652. However, there is a notification in the State Archives Marburg (115, Waldeck 2, Nassau 339) dated 7 November 1652. From Hulst, Mary Magdalene, Countess of Nassau-Siegen, reports the death of her husband, which took place «heute morgen umb 4 Uhren».") He was first buried in Terborg. On 17 July 1669 (Note: Lück & Wunderlich (1956), p. 27 however, mention the date 19 July 1669.) he was reburied in the Fürstengruft in Siegen.

== Marriage and issue ==
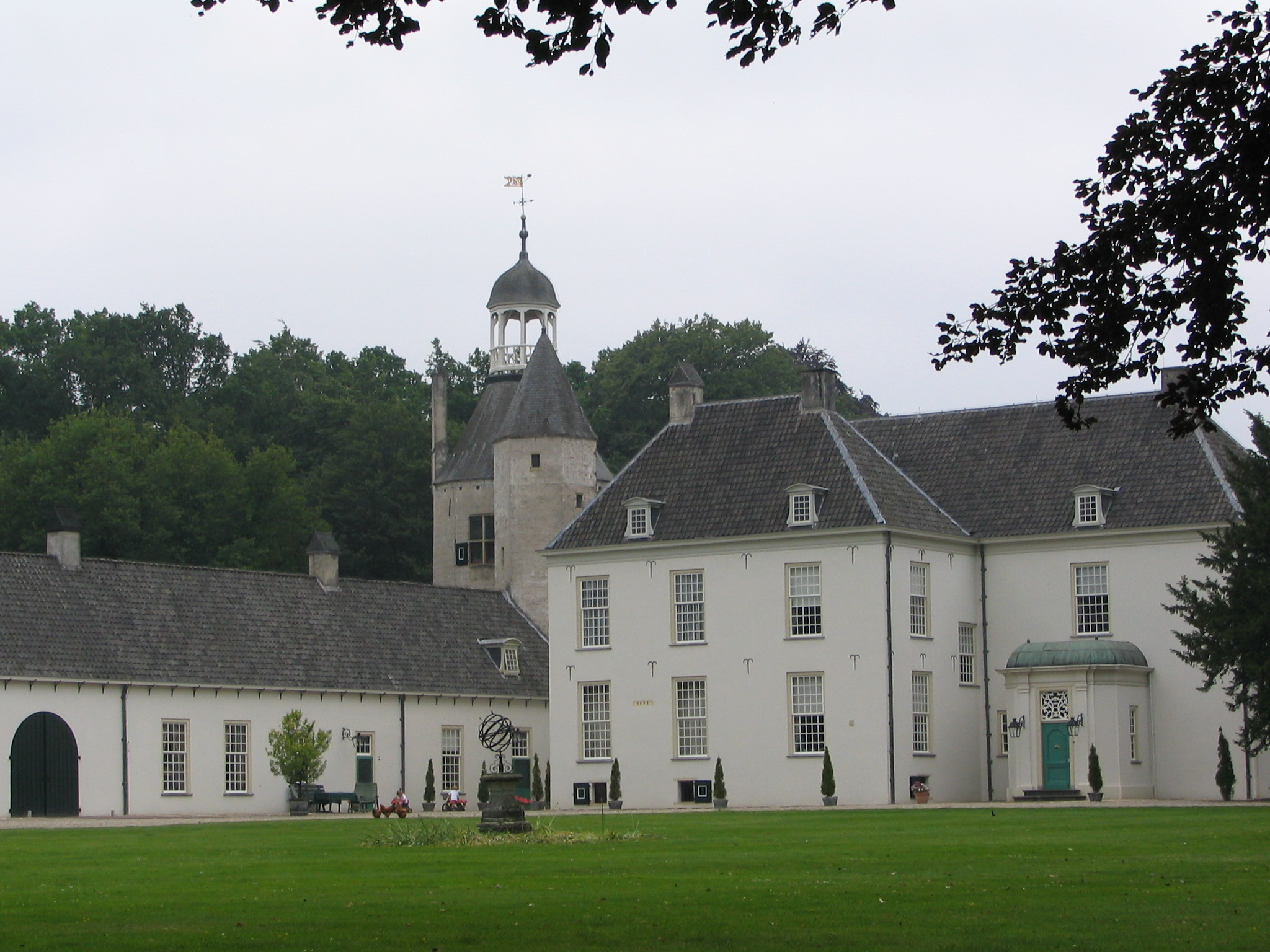
Wisch Castle in Terborg, 2004.

Henry married at Wisch Castle in Terborg on 19/29 April 1646 (Note: "On 9‑3‑1646 in Europäische Stammtafeln I, 117 en IV, 39. On 19‑4‑1646 in Geschiedenis der Graven van Limburg Stirum volume III, 1, 9 with indication of the place «Terborg». On 29‑4‑1646 in the Genealogisches Handbuch des Adels XXXIII, 51. 9‑3‑1646 is the date of the signing of the marriage contract (see Menk (1967), p. 2). Although a notification was sent to the princes of Holstein inviting them to the ceremony on 15/25 April, must be admitted that it was postponed to 19/29 April (see the marriage registers of Terborg, and Menk (1967), p. 2). The archives of the princes of Wittgenstein in Laasphe (F., 320^{III}) also contain a draft of a congratulatory letter to Count Henry of Nassau-Siegen on the occasion of his marriage on 19/29 April, announced on 16/26 March.") to Countess Mary Magdalene of Limburg-Stirum (Note: "Europäische Stammtafeln calls her Maria Elisabeth. On the other hand, we found Maria Magdalena in the Geschiedenis van de Graven van Limburg-Stirum volume III, 1, 9, which is confirmed by the death notification: «Maria Magdalena».") (1632 (Note: "Geschiedenis der Graven van Limburg Stirum sets the birth around 1632.") – Nassauischer Hof, Siegen, 27 December 1707 (Note: "See the parish registers of Siegen. Burial on the 29th in the royal crypt. A notification dated Siegen 27 December 1707 (State Archives Wiesbaden 130^{II}, 2380^{III} c) states that she died «heute Nachmittag zwischen 1 u. 2 Uhren». An identical notification is kept in the State Archives Marburg (4f. Nassau-Siegen, Nr. 241).")), the daughter and only child of Count George Ernest of Limburg-Stirum and his first wife Countess Magdalene of Bentheim-Tecklenburg. Mary Magdalene was the heiress of the County of Bronkhorst and the heerlijkheden of Wisch, Borculo, Lichtenvoorde and Wildenborch.

From the marriage of Henry and Mary Magdalene the following children were born:

1. Ernestine (Wisch Castle, Terborg, 15 November 1647 (Note: "Baptismal register of the Reformed Church in Terborg: born on 15‑11, at eleven o'clock in the morning.") – Hulst, October 1652 (Note: "See Royal House Archive of the Netherlands IV/1512. The notification was sent from Hulst to Mengerskirchen on 10‑10‑1652, where it was received on 29‑10‑1652: «im 5 Jahr ihrer blühenden Jugend … im verwichenen Montage abends umb 7 Uhr». If the letter, written on 10 October, is dated in the old style, «verwichene Montag» was on 4 October. But it was the new style that was used in Hulst. Furthermore, the letter is addressed to John Louis, reigning prince of Nassau-Hadamar, who belonged to the Catholic religion. This is another reason to assume that the letter is dated in the new style and that Ernestine died on Monday 7 October 1652, new style.")).
2. Fürst William Maurice (Wisch Castle, Terborg, 18/28 January 1649 (Note: "See the baptismal register of Terborg: the 18th, at three o'clock in the afternoon.") – Nassauischer Hof, Siegen, 23 January 1691^{Jul.} (Note: "See notification of death (State Archives Marburg 115, Waldeck, 2, Nassau, 339) from Siegen 24‑1‑1691: «gestern Freytag den 23. dieses (therefore old style) abendts zwischen 5 und 6 Uhren».")), succeeded his uncle John Maurice as Fürst of Nassau-Siegen in 1679. Married at Schaumburg Castle on 6 February 1678^{Jul.} (Note: "In the parish records of Terborg it is stated that the marriage took place in Schaumburg («in arce Schaumburgenei»). See the marriage announcement (State Archives Marburg 4f, Nassau-Siegen, 203) at Schaumburg 10‑2 old style: «den 6 dieses … das fürstl. Beylager gehalten». Dek (1962) and Europäische Stammtafeln mention 6‑1‑1678; that is the engagement date (see the notification in State Archives Marburg 4f, Nassau-Siegen 203). Dek (1970) no longer gives a place and date of marriage, but only mentions that the announcement was made in Lichtenvoorde on 3‑2‑1678.") to Princess Ernestine Charlotte of Nassau-Schaumburg (Schaumburg Castle, 20 May 1662^{Jul.} (Note: "See State Archives Wiesbaden (170^{III}) several birth notifications dated Schaumburg 21/31 May 1662: «gestern den 20/30ten diesses, des Abends zwischen 8 und 9 Uhren».") – Nassauischer Hof, Siegen, 21 February 1732 (Note: "See State Archives Wiesbaden (170^{III}) notification of death dated Siegen 23‑2‑1732: «vorgestern Mittag zwischen 11 und 12 Uhren in dem 70ten Jahres ihres Alters». See also the parish records of Siegen. Europäische Stammtafeln I, 117 and 118 states the fantasised dates 21‑2‑1714 and 19‑10‑1714 respectively.")).
3. Sophie Amalie (Wisch Castle, Terborg, 10 January 1650^{Jul.} (Note: "See the parish registers of Terborg: the 10th at half past seven in the evening. See the notification of birth in the archives of Copenhagen (Tyske Kanc UA, N.-Siegen A I, 1) from Terborg 11/21‑1‑1650: «gestern abend zwischen sieben und acht Uhren». Europäische Stammtafeln I, 117 states born on 20‑2‑1650.") – Mitau, 15/25 November 1688 (Note: "See notification of death (State Archives Marburg 4f, Kurland Nr. 8) from Mitau, 26‑11‑1688: «Gestern Morgens umb acht Uhren nachdem Ihro Lbd. zwey Tage nach ihrer Entbindung mit grosser Schwachheit gefallen». See Royal House Archive of the Netherlands IV/1514: «Bericht über Entbindung der Sophia Amalia Fürstin zu Nassau Siegen, verm. Herzg. zu Kurland von einer Tochter am 5/15 November … und der bald darauf am 15/25 November, des Morgens um 8 Uhr, erfolgte Ableben der Kindbetterin, deren Leichnam am 16/26 Dezember des Abends am 7 Uhr in die reformierte Kirche zu Mitau überführt wurde». According to Europäische Stammtafeln and Dek (1970) the death occurred on 25‑12‑1688.")), married in The Hague on 5 October 1675^{Greg.} (Note: "See Royal House Archive of the Netherlands IV/1513. According to this document, the marriage contract was signed on 27‑9‑1678 in The Hague. Another copy of the contract signed on the same day, but in Mitau, is to be found in the archives of the princes of Sayn-Wittgenstein-Hohenstein at Wittgenstein Castle in Laasphe, Urk. 187 XXXXVI. It states that the marriage (Beilager) was consummated in The Hague on 5 October (new style) 1675.") to Duke Frederick Casimir of Courland (6 July 1650 – 22 January 1698).
4. Frederick Henry (Note: Huberty, et al. (1981), p. 274 names him Frédéric. The given name Friedrich Heinrich in Menk (2004), p. 192, Lück (1981), p. 113 and Lück & Wunderlich (1956), p. 134. The given name Frederik Hendrik in Dek (1970), p. 96 and Vorsterman van Oyen (1882), p. 127. The given name Frederik Hendrik/Friedrich Heinrich in Blok (1911), p. 902.) (Wisch Castle, Terborg, 11 November 1651 (Note: "See the parish registers of Terborg. See State Archives Wiesbaden (170^{III}), two notifications of birth dated Terborg 15‑11‑1651: «uff vergangenen Martini, welcher war den 11ten Novemb.».") – Roermond, 4 September 1676 (Note: "State Archives Wiesbaden (170^{III}), several notifications of death, of which at least two, dated Cleves 9‑9‑1676, state «am 4. dieses, abents um 7 Uhr zu Roeremondi». Dek (1970) says he died on the battlefield «sneuvelde bij Roermond», which hardly corresponds to the phrases in the notifications of death: «durch einen sanften und seligen Tod» and «nach ausgestandener schwerer Kranckheit». The date 25‑8 (also found in Europäische Stammtafeln) has to correspond with the old style. Should it read: deceased 4‑9‑1676, new style?")), was a colonel in the Dutch States Army.

The sons William Maurice and Frederick Henry were adopted by their uncle John Maurice of Nassau-Siegen after the death of their father. William Maurice, Sophie Amalie and Frederick Henry were elevated to the rank and title of prince(ss) in 1664. (Note: "See Dek (1962), p. 92.")

== Ancestors ==
Ancestors of Henry of Nassau-Siegen
Great-great-grandparents	John V of Nassau-Siegen (1455–1516) ⚭ 1482; Elisabeth of Hesse-Marburg (1466–1523)	Bodo III 'the Blissful' of Stolberg-Wernigerode (1467–1538) ⚭ 1500; Anna of Eppstein-Königstein (1481–1538)	John IV of Leuchtenberg (1470–1531) ⚭ 1502; Margaret of Schwarzburg-Blankenburg (1482–1518)	Frederick V 'the Elder' of Brandenburg-Ansbach (1460–1536) ⚭ 1479; Sophia of Poland (1464–1512)	Frederick I of Denmark (1471–1533) ⚭ 1502; Anne of Brandenburg (1487–1514)	Magnus I of Saxe-Lauenburg (?–1543) ⚭ 1509; Catherine of Brunswick-Wolfenbüttel (?–1563)	Philip I of Brunswick-Grubenhagen (ca. 1476–1551) ⚭ 1517; Catherine of Mansfeld (1501–1535)	George I of Pomerania (1493–1531) ⚭ 1513; Amalie of the Palatinate (1490–1524)
Great-grandparents	William I 'the Rich' of Nassau-Siegen (1487–1559) ⚭ 1531; Juliane of Stolberg-Wernigerode (1506–1580)		George III of Leuchtenberg (1502–1555) ⚭ 1528; Barbara of Brandenburg-Ansbach (1495–1552)		Christian III of Denmark (1503–1559) ⚭ 1525; Dorothea of Saxe-Lauenburg (1511–1571)		Ernest V of Brunswick-Grubenhagen (1518–1567) ⚭ 1547; Margaret of Pomerania (1518–1569)	
Grandparents	John VI 'the Elder' of Nassau-Siegen (1536–1606) ⚭ 1559; Elisabeth of Leuchtenberg (1537–1579)				John 'the Younger' of Schleswig-Holstein-Sonderburg (1545–1622) ⚭ 1568; Elisabeth of Brunswick-Grubenhagen (1550–1586)			
Parents	John VII 'the Middle' of Nassau-Siegen (1561–1623) ⚭ 1603; Margaret of Schleswig-Holstein-Sonderburg (1583–1658)							

== Sources ==
- Aßmann, Helmut & Menk, Friedhelm (1996). Auf den Spuren von Nassau und Oranien in Siegen (in German). Siegen: Gesellschaft für Stadtmarketing Siegen e.V.
- Behr, Kamill (1854). Genealogie der in Europa regierenden Fürstenhäuser (in German). Leipzig: Verlag von Bernhard Tauchnitz.
- Blok, P.J. (1911). "Frederik Hendrik, 2 Friedrich Heinrich". In Molhuysen, P.C. & Blok, P.J. (eds.). Nieuw Nederlandsch Biografisch Woordenboek (in Dutch). Vol. Eerste deel. Leiden: A.W. Sijthoff. p. 902.
- Blok, P.J. (1911). "Hendrik, Heinrich". In Molhuysen, P.C. & Blok, P.J. (eds.). Nieuw Nederlandsch Biografisch Woordenboek (in Dutch). Vol. Eerste deel. Leiden: A.W. Sijthoff. pp. 1075–1076.
- Blok, P.J. (1911). "Willem Maurits, Wilhelm Moritz". In Molhuysen, P.C. & Blok, P.J. (eds.). Nieuw Nederlandsch Biografisch Woordenboek (in Dutch). Vol. Eerste deel. Leiden: A.W. Sijthoff. p. 1578.
- Dek, A.W.E. (1962). Graf Johann der Mittlere von Nassau-Siegen und seine 25 Kinder (in German). Rijswijk: Krips Repro.
- Dek, A.W.E. (1968). "De afstammelingen van Juliana van Stolberg tot aan het jaar van de Vrede van Münster". Spiegel der Historie. Maandblad voor de geschiedenis der Nederlanden (in Dutch). 1968 (7/8): 228–303.
- Dek, A.W.E. (1970). Genealogie van het Vorstenhuis Nassau (in Dutch). Zaltbommel: Europese Bibliotheek.
- von Ehrenkrook, Hans Friedrich; Förster, Karl & Marchtaler, Kurt Erhard (1928). Ahnenreihen aus allen deutschen Gauen. Beilage zum Archiv für Sippenforschung und allen verwandten Gebieten (in German). Görlitz: Verlag für Sippenforschung und Wappenkunde C.A. Starke.
- Huberty, Michel; Giraud, Alain & Magdelaine, F. & B. (1981). l'Allemagne Dynastique (in French). Vol. Tome III: Brunswick-Nassau-Schwarzbourg. Le Perreux: Alain Giraud.
- Huberty, Michel; Giraud, Alain & Magdelaine, F. & B. (1994). l'Allemagne Dynastique (in French). Vol. Tome VII: Oldenbourg-Familles alliées H-L. Le Perreux-sur-Marne: Alain Giraud.
- Kooijmans, Luuc (2000). Liefde in opdracht. Het hofleven van Willem Frederik van Nassau (in Dutch). Amsterdam: Uitgeverij Bert Bakker. ISBN 90-351-2201-1.
- Lück, Alfred (1981) [1967]. Siegerland und Nederland (in German) (2nd ed.). Siegen: Siegerländer Heimatverein e.V.
- Lück, Alfred & Wunderlich, Hermann (1956) [1952]. Die Fürstengruft zu Siegen (in German). Siegen: Verkehrsverein Siegen e.V.
- Menk, Friedhelm (1967). "Johann der Mittlere, Graf zu Nassau-Siegen (1561–1623) und seine zweite Gemahlin". Siegerland (in German). Band XLIV (Heft 1): 1–28.
- Menk, Friedhelm (1967). "Wilhelm Graf zu Nassau-Siegen (1592–1642)". Siegerland (in German). Band XLIV (Heft 2): 53–59.
- Menk, Friedhelm (1971). Quellen zur Geschichte des Siegerlandes im niederländischen königlichen Hausarchiv (in German). Siegen: Stadt Siegen/Forschungsstelle Siegerland.
- Menk, Friedhelm (1979). "Johann Moritz Fürst zu Nassau-Siegen". Siegerland (in German). Band LVI (Heft 1–2): 1vv.
- Menk, Friedhelm (2004). "Die Fürstengruft zu Siegen und die darin von 1669 bis 1781 erfolgten Beisetzungen". In Burwitz, Ludwig; Menk, Friedhelm; Opfermann, Ulrich Friedrich; Pfau, Dieter & Plaum, Bernd D. (eds.). Siegener Beiträge. Jahrbuch für regionale Geschichte (in German). Vol. 9. Siegen: Geschichtswerkstatt Siegen – Arbeitskreis für Regionalgeschichte e.V. pp. 183–202. ISSN 1431-6684.
- Neander, Irene (1961). "Friedrich Kasimir Kettler". Neue Deutsche Biographie (in German). Vol. Band 5. Berlin: Duncker & Humblot. pp. 513–514. ISBN 3-428-00186-9.
- Schiemann, Theodor (1882). "Friedrich Casimir Kettler". Allgemeine Deutsche Biographie (in German). Vol. Band 15. Leipzig: Duncker & Humblot. pp. 685–688.
- Schutte, O. (1979). "Genealogische gegevens". In Tamse, C.A. (ed.). Nassau en Oranje in de Nederlandse geschiedenis (in Dutch). Alphen aan den Rijn: A.W. Sijthoff. pp. 40–44, 224–228. ISBN 90-218-2447-7.
- Spielmann, Christian (1909). Geschichte von Nassau (Land und Haus) von den ältesten Zeiten bis zur Gegenwart (in German). Vol. Teil 1. Politische Geschichten. Wiesbaden: P. Plauen.
- Textor von Haiger, Johann (1617). Nassauische Chronik (in German). Herborn: Christoph Raab.
- Vorsterman van Oyen, A.A. (1882). Het vorstenhuis Oranje-Nassau. Van de vroegste tijden tot heden (in Dutch). Leiden/Utrecht: A.W. Sijthoff/J.L. Beijers.

Henry of Nassau-Siegen (1611–1652) House of Nassau-Siegen (Protestant branch) Born: 9 August 1611 Died: 27 October/7 November 1652
Political offices
Preceded by Jacques d'Heynin	Governor of Hulst; 1645 – 1652	Succeeded by Gijsbrecht van Hardenbroek
