= Otto IV of Schaumburg =

German nobleman

- Born: 1517
- Died: 21 December 1576 (aged 58–59); Bückeburg

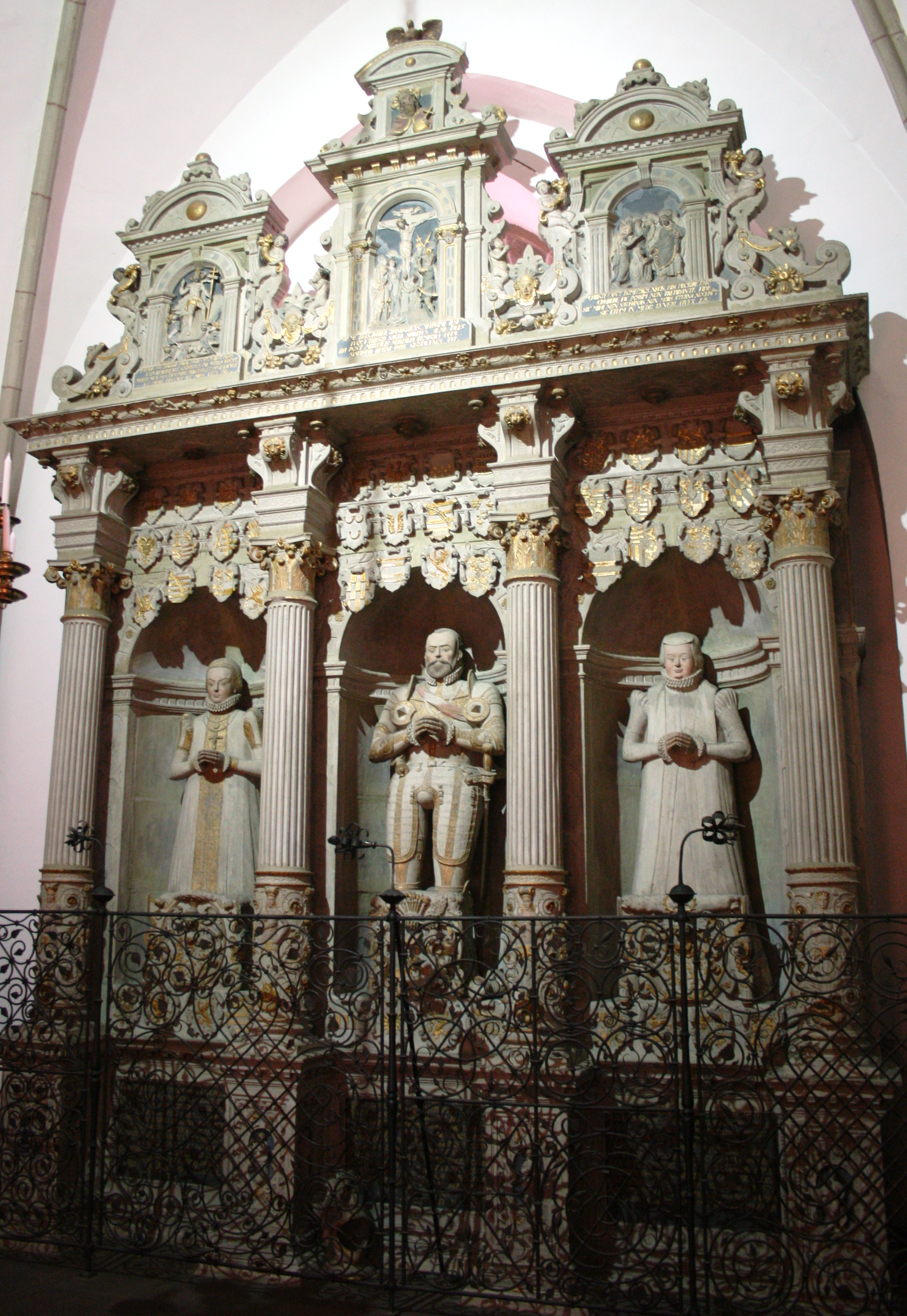
Grave monument for Otto IV and his two wives in St. Martini Church in Stadthagen.

Otto IV of Schaumburg (1517 – 21 December 1576) was a German nobleman. He was a ruling Count of Schauenburg and of Holstein-Pinneberg. He was a son of Jobst I and his wife Mary of Nassau-Siegen, a daughter of Count John V of Nassau-Siegen.

He adopted the teachings of Martin Luther. However, with respect to his elder brothers Cologne's Archbishop-Electors Adolphus III (reg. 1547–1556) and Anthony I (reg. 1557–1558) he refrained from open confrontation. In 1559 he officially began the Reformation in Schauenburg and Holstein-Pinneberg. These areas remained Lutheran throughout the Counter-Reformation and into modern times.

== Marriages and issue ==
Otto first married Mary (1527–1554), daughter of Duke Barnim XI of Pomerania-Stettin. Mary and Otto had four sons:

- Hermann (1545–1592), Prince-Bishop of Minden (1566–1581)
- Otto (1545–1572) (mentally insane)
- Adolphus XIV (1547–1601), count regnant in Schaumburg and Holstein-Pinneberg, married to Elisabeth of Brunswick-Wolfenbüttel (1567–1618)
- Anthony (1549–1599), Prince-Bishop of Minden (1587–1599)

In 1558 Otto married a second time, with Elisabeth Ursula (1539–1586), a daughter of Ernest I, Duke of Brunswick-Lüneburg. Elisabeth Ursula and Otto had two daughters and one son:

- Mary (1559–1616) married in 1591 Count Josse of Limburg-Styrum (1560–1621)
- Elisabeth, married in 1585 Count Simon VI of Lippe (1554-1613)
- Ernest (1569–1622), count regnant of Schaumburg and Holstein-Pinneberg as of 1601, elevated to Prince of Schaumburg in 1619.

== See also ==
- Martin Luther

Otto of Schaumburg House of Schaumburg Born: 1517 Died: 21 December 1576 in Bückeburg
Catholic Church titles
Regnal titles
Preceded by Balthasar Merklin	Prince-Bishop of Hildesheim as Otto III; 1533–1537	Succeeded by Valentin von Teutleben
Regnal titles
Preceded by John V	Count of Schaumburg and Holstein-Pinneberg as Otto IV; 1544–1576 with his elder brother John V (1531–1560)	Succeeded by Adolphus XI
