= Eberhard Billick =

German Catholic theologian (died 1557)

Eberhard Billick OCarm (1499/1500 – 12 January 1557) was a German Catholic priest and theologian, instrumental in keeping the city of Cologne Catholic during the Reformation.

== Biography ==
Billick was born 1499 or 1500 in Cologne and died there 12 January, 1557. Of a family which gave a number of prominent men to the Carmelites of Cologne, Eberhard entered the Carmelite Order in 1513, took his vows in 1514, became a priest and master of students in 1525, and reader of divinity in 1526; he matriculated at the University of Cologne in 1528.

Billick was made Prior of Cassel, 1531, Prior of Cologne, 1536–1542, received his licentiate and doctorate of divinity, 1540 and in 1542 was appointed Provincial of the province of Lower Germany. He retained this dignity until his death, for, although nominated auxiliary Bishop of Cologne, he did not live to be consecrated. Billick's activity on behalf of his order was successful; he enrolled numerous candidates, improved the plan of studies, saved several monasteries from destruction, re-established others, and reformed both his own province and that of Upper Germany. His chief importance, however, lies in his dealings with the Archbishop of Cologne. If Cologne remained true to the Catholic cause the merit is principally due to the provincial of the Carmelites. As the leader of the lower clergy he protested against the heretical tendencies of Archbishop Hermann von Wied, who since 1536 had favoured the Reformers. Von Wied was excommunicated in 1546, gave up the archbishopric in 1547, and died in 1552. It was Billick's exposure of the archbishop's breach of faith that led to the latter's deposition. Writing against Bucer, Billick drew upon himself the ire of Luther and Melanchthon. He took part in the disputations of Worms, 1540, Ratisbon, 1541 and 1546, and Augsburg, 1547, and as theologian accompanied the new Archbishop of Cologne to the Council of Trent, 1551.
