= Georg Ernst of Limburg Stirum =

Count of Limburg Stirum

Georg Ernst of Limburg Stirum, count of Limburg Stirum, count of Bronckhorst, Lord of Wisch, Lichtenvoorde and Wildenborch, son of Jobst of Limburg.

Georg Ernst was Captain (in 1625), then Major (in 1641) of the Army of the Republic of the United Netherlands.

He married twice. His first wife was countess Magdalene, the daughter of Arnold III of Bentheim, Limburg and Bronckhorst. They had one daughter: Mary Magdalene (d. 1707), who married Henry of Nassau-Siegen (d. 1652). Henry and Mary Magdalene had four children: Ernestine, William Maurice, Sophie Amalie and Frederick Henry.

After Magdalena's death, Georg Ernst married in Terborg, on 13 January 1636, to countess Sophie Margarete (1610-1665), a daughter of Count John VII of Nassau-Siegen. She was a titular countess of Nassau, Katzenelnbogen, Vianden and Diez and Lady of Beilstein. She was the older sister of Henry of Nassau-Siegen (d. 1652) and therefor the sister of his son-in-law. This marriage was childless.

Georg Ernst died in 1666.

== Literature ==
- Genealogische Handbuch des Adels, Gräfliche Häuser A Band II, 1955;
- W. Gf v. Limburg Stirum, "Stamtafel der Graven van Limburg Stirum", 's Gravenhage 1878;
