= Anton of Schauenburg =

Archbishop-Elector of Cologne

- Archbishop of Cologne
- Church: Roman Catholic Church
- Archdiocese: Cologne
- See: Cologne
- Appointed: 1557
- Term ended: 1558

Personal details
- Born: Unknown
- Died: 18 June 1558

Anton of Schauenburg (German: Anton von Schaumburg) (died June 18, 1558) was Archbishop-Elector of Cologne from 1557 to 1558.

== Biography ==
Anton of Schauenburg was the son of Jobst I, Count of Holstein-Schauenburg and his wife Mary of Nassau-Siegen.

His elder brother Adolf III of Schauenburg was his predecessor as Archbishop of Cologne (1547-1556). On 26 October 1557 the cathedral chapter of Cologne Cathedral elected Anton to be the new Archbishop of Cologne. This election was confirmed by Pope Paul IV on October 1557. Anton was never ordained as a priest or as a bishop, and had only achieved the clerical rank of subdeacon at the time of his death. He spent the bulk of his time as Archbishop attempting to improve the disastrous financial situation of the archbishopric.

Anton died in June 1558. Cornelis Floris de Vriendt created matching tombs for Anton and his brother Adolf in Cologne Cathedral. Originally located in the choir, they were relocated to the apse chapels in 1863. Anton's is in the west end of the Engelbert Chapel.

== See also ==
- Counts of Schauenburg and Holstein

Anthony of Schaumburg House of Schaumburg Died: 18 June 1558
Catholic Church titles
Regnal titles
Preceded by Adolphus III of Schauenburg	Archbishop-Elector of Cologne and Duke of Westphalia and Angria as Anthony I 1556–1558	Succeeded by Gebhard I von Mansfeld-Vorderort
