= Magdalena of Neuenahr-Alpen =

German noblewoman

- Born: c. 1550
- Died: 13 January 1626
- Noble family: House of Neuenahr-Alpen
- Spouse: Arnold III, Count of Bentheim-Steinfurt-Tecklenburg-Limburg
- Father: Gumprecht II, Count of Neuenahr-Alpen
- Mother: Amöna of Daun-Falkenstein

Magdalena of Neuenahr-Alpen (c. 1550 – 13 January 1626) was a German noblewoman. She was the heiress of the House of Neuenahr-Alpen; she inherited the County of Limburg. By marriage, she was Countess of Tecklenburg.

== Life ==
She was the daughter of Count Gumprecht II and his wife Amöna, a daughter of Count Wirich V of Daun-Falkenstein. On 26 July 1573 in Wesel, she married Count Arnold III of Bentheim-Tecklenburg. They enjoyed a happy married life and had seven sons and four daughters. They resided alternately in Bentheim and Steinfurt, and when they grew older, mostly in Tecklenburg.

Via Magdalena's relatives, they had close ties with the leading Calvinist princes in the Holy Roman Empire. Her half-sister Amalia was married to Elector Palatine Frederick III. Her brother Adolf of Neuenahr, Count of Limburg and Moers was also a leading proponent of Calvinism. In 1573, her husband also converted to Calvinism, probably influenced by her relatives. Over time, they introduced the new faith in the territories of the County of Tecklenburg. The County suffered when the Eighty Years' War raged in the neighbouring Netherlands.

After her brother Adolf died in 1589, Magdalena inherited the Lordships of Alpen, Helpenstein, Linnep and the office of city advocatus of Cologne. When her half-sister Amalia died in 1590, Magdalena inherited the County of Limburg and Hohenlimburg Castle. However, the Duke of Jülich-Cleves-Berg, who was the liege lord of Limburg, did not recognize her right to inherit and claimed Limberg for himself as a completed fief. Archbishop Ernest of Cologne occupied Limburg militarily in 1584, with permission from the Emperor, to prevent this expansion of the Duke's territory. He then tried to keep the county and annex it to his Archbishopric. Although Magdalena's right to inherit was recognized by the courts, the county and the castle remained occupied by Cologne, until 1610. Cologne only ended the occupation when it was pressured by the Netherlands. After Cologne retreated from Limburg, Magdalena appointed her son Conrad Gumprecht as governor.

After Arnold died in 1605, his father's territories were divided among her sons. Some of them were still minors, and she acted as regent until 1609.

In 1611, Calvinism was introduced in Limburg. In 1616, she ceded the county to Conrad Gumprecht. In 1618, he died and ownership of the county reverted to Magdalena, who appointed her son's widow Johanetta Elisabeth of Nassau-Dillenburg as governor.

== Issue ==
Arnold and Magdalena had the following children:

- Otto (22 December 1574 in Steinfurt – 1574)
- Eberwin Wirich (14 January 1576 in Bentheim – 31 May 1596 in Padua)
- Adolf (7 July 1577 in Steinfurt – 5 November 1623), married in 1606 to Margaret of Nassau-Wiesbaden
- Anna (4 January 1579 – 9 December 1624), married in 1595 to Prince Christian I of Anhalt-Bernburg
- Arnold Jost (4 April 1580 – 26 August 1643), married in 1608 to Anna Amalia of Isenburg-Büdingen, daughter of Wolfgang Ernst I of Isenburg-Büdingen-Birstein.
- Amalie Amoena (15 May 1581 in Tecklenburg – 31 January 1584 in Bentheim)
- William Henry (13 February 1584 in Bentheim – 6 October 1632), married in 1617 with Anna Elisabeth of Anhalt-Dessau
- Conrad Gumprecht (10 March 1585 in Bentheim – 10 March 1618), married in 1616 Johannetta Elisabeth of Nassau-Siegen
- Amoena Amalia (19 March 1586 in Bentheim – 3 September 1625)married in 1606 to Prince Louis I of Anhalt-Köthen
- Frederick Ludolph (23 August 1587 in Bentheim – 8 January 1629)
- Magdalena (6 May 1591 in Steinfurt – 1649) married on 24 May 1631 in Steinfurt with George Ernest, son of Jobst of Limburg

== Footnotes ==
Magdalena of Neuenahr-Alpen House of Neuenahr-Alpen Born: c. 1550 Died: 13 January 1626
Preceded by Gumprecht II	Count of Limburg; 1602-1610	Succeeded by Conrad Gumprecht
