= Adolf III of Schauenburg =

Archbishop-Elector of Cologne, Count of Schauenburg and Holstein-Pinneberg

- Archbishop of Cologne
- Church: Roman Catholic Church
- Archdiocese: Cologne
- See: Cologne
- Appointed: 1547
- Term ended: 1556

Personal details
- Born: 19 January 1511
- Died: 20 September 1556 (aged 45)

Adolf III of Schauenburg (German: Adolf von Schaumburg) (1511-1556) was the Archbishop-Elector of Cologne from 1547 to 1556.

== Biography ==
Adolf of Schauenburg was born on January 19, 1511, and baptized on February 3. He was the son of Jobst I, Count of Holstein-Schauenburg and his wife Mary of Nassau-Siegen.

As a younger son, Adolf was groomed for a life in the church from a young age. From 1522 he studied at Leuven. He became a canon of Liège Cathedral on September 2, 1528, and then provost of the cathedral on May 30, 1533. In 1529, he also became a canon of Mainz Cathedral and, on December 23, 1529, of Cologne Cathedral. He became dean of St. Gereon's Basilica, and then its provost in 1533.

With his father's death in 1531, Adolf returned to Schaumburg to act as his younger brothers' guardian. He played a role in the governance of Schaumburg until 1544.

In the early 1530s, the Archbishop of Cologne, Hermann of Wied, grew increasingly sympathetic to the Protestant Reformation. To try to curb the archbishop's influence, on December 17, 1533, the cathedral chapter of Cologne Cathedral elected Adolf to be the coadjutor bishop of Cologne. He was to be a conservative counterweight to Hermann's attempted reforms.

On June 3, 1543, Pope Paul III wrote to Adolf encouraging him to be vigilant in his efforts against the archbishop. The pope excommunicated Hermann on July 3, 1546, naming Adolf the administrator of the archdiocese in his stead. The cathedral chapter elected Adolf as Archbishop of Cologne on January 24, 1547. He was ordained as a priest by Bishop Johann Nopel on May 3, 1547.

Adolf's first task was to roll back the reforms initiated by his predecessor. Hermann had installed Martin Bucer, but Adolf now banned Protestant preaching throughout the archdiocese. Accompanied by Eberhard Billick, provincial superior of the Carmelites, Adolf attended the Diet of Augsburg in 1547-48. He was ordained a bishop on April 8, 1548, in the presence of Pope Paul III and Charles V, Holy Roman Emperor. He attended the 1551 session of the Council of Trent, accompanied by Billick and Johann Gropper.

Adolf died in Brühl on September 20, 1556. Cornelis Floris de Vriendt created matching tombs for Adolf and his younger brother Anton of Schauenburg (d. 1558) in Cologne Cathedral. Originally located in the choir, they were relocated to the radiating chapels in 1863.

== See also ==
- Counts of Schauenburg and Holstein

Adolphus of Schaumburg House of Schaumburg Born: 19 January 1511 Died: 20 September 1556 in Brühl
Catholic Church titles
Regnal titles
Preceded by Hermann of Wied	Archbishop-Elector of Cologne and Duke of Westphalia and Angria as Adolphus III; 1546–1556	Succeeded by Anthony of Schauenburg
