= Jobst I of Holstein-Schauenburg =

German nobleman (1483–1531)

Jobst I, Count of Holstein-Schauenburg
- Born: 1483
- Died: 1531 (aged 47–48)
- Noble family: House of Schauenburg
- Spouse: Mary of Nassau-Siegen
- Father: John IV, Count of Holstein-Schauenburg
- Mother: Cordula of Gemen

Jobst I, Count of Holstein-Schauenburg (1483-1531) was a German nobleman. He was the ruling Count of Schauenburg and Holstein-Pinneberg from 1527 until his death. He was a son of John IV (1449 – 30 March 1527) and his wife, Cordula of Gemen (d. 30 May 1528).

== Marriage and issue ==
In 1506, he married Mary of Nassau-Siegen (1491-1547), a daughter of Count John V of Nassau-Siegen. Among their children were:

- Otto, died young
- Adolph III, Elector and Archbishop of Cologne from 1547 to 1556
- Anton, Elector and Archbishop of Cologne from 1556 to 1558
- John V (c. 1512 – 1560), Count of Holstein-Schauenburg from 1531, married in 1555 to Countess Elisabeth of East Frisia (1531-1558)
- Cordula (1516-1542), married:
  1. on 8 April 1529 to Count Everwin of Bentheim (1461-13 December 1530)
  2. in 1536 to Count Gumprecht II of Neuenahr-Alpen
- Otto IV (1517-1576), co-ruler from 1531 to 1560, ruling Count of Holstein-Schauenburg from 1560
- Jobst II (c. 1520 – 1581), ruling Lord of Gemen from 1531, married in 1561 to Elisabeth of Palland (d. 1606)
- William II (d. 1580), Provost of Hildesheim

Jobst I of Holstein-Schauenburg House of Schauenburg Born: 1483 Died: 1531
| Preceded by John IV | Count of Schauenburg and Holstein-Pinneberg; 1527-1531 | Succeeded by John V |
