= Mary of Nassau-Siegen (1491–1547) =

German countess (1491–1547)

- Countess Consort of Holstein-Schauenburg-Pinneberg
- Coat of arms
- Full name: Mary Countess of Nassau-Siegen
- Native name: Maria Gräfin von Nassau-Siegen
- Born: Mary Gräfin zu Nassau, Vianden und Diez; February 1491; Vianden
- Died: 1547 (aged 55–56); Siegen
- Noble family: House of Nassau-Siegen
- Spouse: Jobst I of Holstein-Schauenburg-Pinneberg
- Father: John V of Nassau-Siegen
- Mother: Elisabeth of Hesse-Marburg

Countess Mary of Nassau-Siegen (Note: In many sources she is called Mary of Nassau-Dillenburg. The County of Nassau-Siegen is erroneously called Nassau-Dillenburg in many sources. The county was not named after the small, unimportant city of Dillenburg, which did not even have a church until 1491, but after the, for that time, large city of Siegen, the economic centre of the county and the counts' main residence. See Lück (1981), passim. It is also evident from the numbering of the reigning counts with the given name John. One John without regal number who ruled the County of Nassau-Dillenburg in the period 1303–1328, and eight counts by the name of John who ruled the County of Nassau-Siegen in the period 1362–1638.) (February 1491 – 1547), German: Maria Gräfin von Nassau-Siegen, official titles: Gräfin zu Nassau, Vianden und Diez, was a countess from the House of Nassau-Siegen, a cadet branch of the Ottonian Line of the House of Nassau, and through marriage Countess of Holstein-Schauenburg-Pinneberg.

== Biography ==
Mary was born in Vianden in February 1491 as the second daughter and sixth and youngest child of Count John V of Nassau-Siegen and his wife Landgravine Elisabeth of Hesse-Marburg. Mary was born in the County of Vianden, that her uncle Engelbert II of Nassau had pledged to Mary's father. Her family spent most of the time there from 1489 onwards, because to get to know these new areas and to include them in his administration, Mary's father had to stay there for longer periods.

Mary married in February 1506 to Count Jobst I of Holstein-Schauenburg-Pinneberg (1483 – 5 June 1531 (Note: The date of death 5 June 1532 in Vorsterman van Oyen (1882), p. 97.)). It was a double wedding, on the same day Mary's elder sister Elisabeth married to Count John III of Wied. The double wedding of Elisabeth and Mary was held at Siegen Castle. A banquet was also held in the city hall in Siegen at which both brides and grooms were present. The feast with the city magistrates was paid for by the brides' father and the city council donated 16 oxen and 19 pigs for the feast. On 16 February 1506, the ʻBeilagerʼ of the two sisters was celebrated in Dillenburg with the greatest of festivities. The purchase of gold fabric for 747 guilders and silk fabric for 396 guilders at the trade fair in Mainz for these celebrations and the wedding of their brother William in Koblenz in May 1506, as well as the unusually high total expenditure of 13,505 guilders in the accounts of 1505/1506, show that these weddings must have been splendid events.

Mary's husband was the son of Count John IV of Holstein-Schauenburg-Pinneberg and his wife Lady Cordula of Gemen.

Mary died in Siegen in 1547. (Note: The date of death 1543 in Vorsterman van Oyen (1882), p. 97.) She had nine children including Adolf III of Schauenburg, Archbishop of Cologne from 1547 to 1556, Anton of Schauenburg, Elector and Archbishop of Cologne from 1556 to 1558 and Otto IV of Schaumburg (1517-1576), co-ruler from 1531 to 1560, ruling Count of Holstein-Schauenburg from 1560.

== Ancestors ==
Ancestors of Mary of Nassau-Siegen
| Great-great-grandparents | John I of Nassau-Siegen (c. 1339–1416) ⚭ 1357; Margaret of the Mark (?–1409) | John III of Polanen (?–1394) ⚭ 1390; Odilia of Salm (?–1428) | Godfrey II of Heinsberg (?–1395) ⚭ 1357; Philippa of Jülich (?–1390) | Otto I of Solms (?–1410) ⚭ Agnes of Falkenstein (c. 1358–1409) | Herman II 'the Scholar' of Hesse (c. 1342–1413) ⚭ 1383; Margaret of Nuremberg (c. 1363–1406) | Frederick I 'the Belligerent' of Saxony (1370–1428) ⚭ 1402; Catherine of Brunswick-Lüneburg (?–1442) | John III of Katzenelnbogen (?–1444) ⚭ 1383; Anne of Katzenelnbogen (?–1439) | Eberhard IV 'the Younger' of Württemberg (1388–1419) ⚭ 1397/98; Henriette of Montbéliard (1387–1444) |
| Great-grandparents | Engelbert I of Nassau-Siegen (c. 1370–1442) ⚭ 1403; Joanne of Polanen (1392–1445) | | John II of Looz-Heinsberg (?–1438) ⚭ 1423; Anne of Solms (?–1433) | | Louis III 'the Peaceful' of Hesse (1402–1458) ⚭ 1433; Anne of Saxony (1420–1462) | | Philip 'the Elder' of Katzenelnbogen (c. 1402–1479) ⚭ 1422; Anne of Württemberg (1408–1471) | |
| Grandparents | John IV of Nassau-Siegen (1410–1475) ⚭ 1440; Mary of Looz-Heinsberg (1424–1502) | | | | Henry III 'the Rich' of Hesse-Marburg (1440–1483) ⚭ 1458; Anne of Katzenelnbogen (1443–1494) | | | |
| Parents | John V of Nassau-Siegen (1455–1516) ⚭ 1482; Elisabeth of Hesse-Marburg (1466–1523) | | | | | | | |

== Sources ==
- Aßmann, Helmut & Menk, Friedhelm (1996). Auf den Spuren von Nassau und Oranien in Siegen (in German). Siegen: Gesellschaft für Stadtmarketing Siegen e.V.
- Behr, Kamill (1854). Genealogie der in Europa regierenden Fürstenhäuser (in German). Leipzig: Verlag von Bernhard Tauchnitz.
- Becker, E. (1983) [1950]. Schloss und Stadt Dillenburg. Ein Gang durch ihre Geschichte in Mittelalter und Neuzeit. Zur Gedenkfeier aus Anlaß der Verleihung der Stadtrechte am 20. September 1344 herausgegeben (in German) (Neuauflage ed.). Dillenburg: Der Magistrat der Stadt Dillenburg.
- Brachthäuser, Christian (1 October 2016). "Kloster, Krypta, Kontroversen. Zum 500. Todesjahr des Siegener Landesherrn Johann V. Graf zu Nassau, Katzenelnbogen, Vianden und Diez, Herr Breda, Grimbergen und Diest (1455–1516)" (PDF). Universitätsstadt Siegen. Archived from the original (PDF) on 16 October 2022.
- Dek, A.W.E. (1970). Genealogie van het Vorstenhuis Nassau (in Dutch). Zaltbommel: Europese Bibliotheek.
- Ehrenkrook, Hans Friedrich von; Förster, Karl & Marchtaler, Kurt Erhard (1928). Ahnenreihen aus allen deutschen Gauen. Beilage zum Archiv für Sippenforschung und allen verwandten Gebieten (in German). Görlitz: Verlag für Sippenforschung und Wappenkunde C.A. Starke.
- Huberty, Michel; Giraud, Alain & Magdelaine, F. & B. (1976). l'Allemagne Dynastique (in French). Vol. Tome I: Hesse-Reuss-Saxe. Le Perreux: Alain Giraud.
- Huberty, Michel; Giraud, Alain & Magdelaine, F. & B. (1981). l'Allemagne Dynastique (in French). Vol. Tome III: Brunswick-Nassau-Schwarzbourg. Le Perreux: Alain Giraud.
- Knetsch, Carl (1917). Das Haus Brabant. Genealogie der Herzoge von Brabant und der Landgrafen von Hessen (in German). Vol. I. Teil: Vom 9. Jahrhundert bis zu Philipp dem Grossmütigen. Darmstadt: Historischer Verein für das Großherzogtum Hessen.
- Lück, Alfred (1981) [1967]. Siegerland und Nederland (in German) (2nd ed.). Siegen: Siegerländer Heimatverein e.V.
- Schutte, O. (1979). "Genealogische gegevens". In Tamse, C.A. (ed.). Nassau en Oranje in de Nederlandse geschiedenis (in Dutch). Alphen aan den Rijn: A.W. Sijthoff. pp. 40–44. ISBN 90-218-2447-7.
- Textor von Haiger, Johann (1617). Nassauische Chronik (in German). Herborn: Christoph Raab.
- Vorsterman van Oyen, A.A. (1882). Het vorstenhuis Oranje-Nassau. Van de vroegste tijden tot heden (in Dutch). Leiden: A.W. Sijthoff/Utrecht: J.L. Beijers.

Mary of Nassau-Siegen (1491–1547) House of Nassau-Siegen Born: February 1491 Died: 1547
Regnal titles
| Preceded by Cordula of Gemen | Countess Consort of Holstein-Schauenburg-Pinneberg; 30 March 1527 – 5 June 1531 | Vacant Title next held by Mary of Pomerania |
