= Jobst of Limburg =

German nobleman (1560–1621)

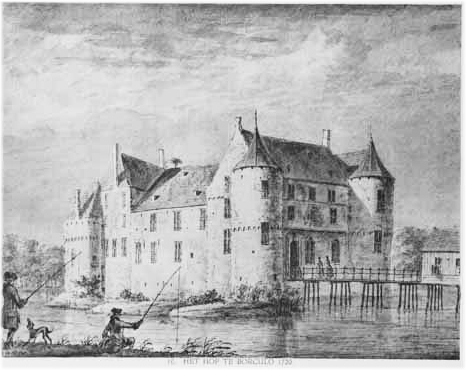
Ending a long succession dispute between the heirs of the last lords of Borculo, the Court of Guelders gave on 20 December 1615 the lordship of Borculo to Count Jobst of Limburg and Bronkhorst.

Jobst of Limburg (19 April 1560, Borculo, Gelderland - 7 August 1621) was count of Limburg and Bronckhorst, Lord of Styrum, Wisch and Borculo (1616), and the son of Hermann Georg of Limburg, count of Limburg and Bronckhorst.

He married in 1591 Countess Maria of Schauenburg and Holstein-Pinneberg (1559-1616) and they had issue:

- Hermann Otto I of Limburg-Styrum, count of Limburg and Bronckhorst, Lord of Styrum and Gemen (born 1592, died 17 Oct. 1644);
- Wilhelm Friedrich of Limburg (died 1636);
- Johann Adolf of Limburg (died 1624). He married Walpurga Anna von Daun, countess von Falkenstein (d.1618);
- Georg Ernst of Limburg Stirum, count of Limburg Stirum, count of Bronckhorst, Lord of Wisch, Lichtenvoorde and Wildenborch (died 1666);
- Bernhard Albrecht of Limburg and Bronckhorst (died 1669);
- Anna Sophie of Limburg. She married (1st) Baron Johann von Morien and (2nd) Johann Melchior von Dombroeck;
- Agnes Elisabeth of Limburg, Abbess of Elten (died 1641).

== Literature ==
- Genealogische Handbuch des Adels, Gräfliche Häuser A Band II, 1955;
- W. Gf v. Limburg Stirum, "Stamtafel der Graven van Limburg Stirum", 's Gravenhage 1878;
