= William Wirich, Count of Daun-Falkenstein =

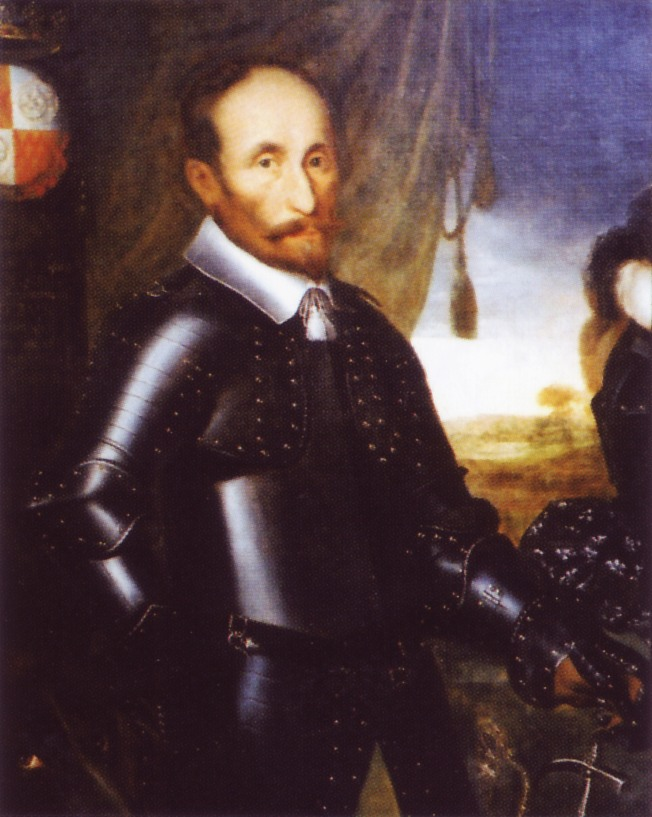
- William Wirich, Count of Daun-Falkenstein
- Born: 1 June 1613
- Died: 26 August 1682 (aged 69)
- Noble family: Counts of Falkenstein
- Spouses: Elizabeth of Waldeck-Wildungen; Agnes Catherine of Limburg-Styrum
- Father: John Adolph, Count of Daun-Falkenstein
- Mother: Anna Maria of Nassau-Siegen

Count William Wirich of Daun-Falkenstein (1 June 1613 – 26 August 1682) was a German nobleman. By descent, he was a Count of Falkenstein; by inheritance, he was Lord of Broich and Bürgel.

== Life ==
Born into an old German nobility, which ruled the County of Falkenstein, William Wirich was a third child and second son of Count John Adolph (1582–1623) and Countess Anna Maria of Nassau-Siegen (1589–1620), a daughter of Count John VII of Nassau-Siegen and Countess Magdalene of Waldeck-Wildungen (1558-1599).

On 28 October 1634, he married at Waldeck Castle to his cousin Elisabeth of Waldeck-Wildungen (1610-1647), the daughter of Christian, Count of Waldeck-Wildungen (1585.-1637) and Countess Elisabeth of Nassau-Siegen (1584-1661).

In 1636, he inherited the County of Falkenstein from his third cousin once removed, Count Francis Christopher of Daun-Falkenstein-Oberstein (1603-1636), who was killed during the Thirty Years' War.

Charles Alexander was his only son who survived into adulthood. However, he was shot by Count Moritz of Limburg-Stirum during a fight on 7 October 1659.

William Wirich remarried to Countess Agnes Catherine of Limburg-Styrum (1629-1686), the daughter of Count Bernhard Albrech of Limburg-Bronckhorst (1597-1637) and Countess Anna Maria of Berg (d. 1653).

However, this marriage remained childless, so when he died, the Daun-Falkenstein branch died out in the male line.

The impoverished count sold the county of Falkenstein to the Duke Charles IV of Lorraine in 1667. The Lordships of Broich and Bürgel were inherited by his third cousin once removed, Count Emich Christian of Leiningen-Dagsburg.

== Marriage and issue ==
On 28 November 1634 at Waldeck Castle, he married his cousin Elizabeth (1610–1647), the daughter of Count Christian of Waldeck-Wildungen. They had the following children:

- Anna Elizabeth (9 January 1636 – 1685), married:

1. in 1658 to George William (1636-1672), the son of Count Emich XIII of Leiningen-Dagsburg (1612-1658) and Christiane of Solms-Laubach (1607-1638)
2. in 1673 to George Frederick, the son of Wild- and Rhinegrave John Casimir of Salm-Kyrburg (1577-1651) and Dorothea of Solms-Laubach (1579-1631)

- Ferdinand Christian (25 December 1636 – 29 March 1642)
- Charlotte Auguste (30 December 1637 – 1713)

married Rev. A. Siebel

- Amalie Sibylle (b. 27 January 1639)

married on 22 August 1664 (renounced 1674), John Louis (1643-1687), the son of Count Emich XIII of Leiningen-Dagsburg and Dorothea of Waldeck-Wildungen

- Christine Louise (18 July 1640 – December 1717)

married on 17 July 1664 to Count Emich Christian (1642-1702), another son of Count Emich XIII of Leiningen-Dagsburg and Dorothea of Waldeck-Wildungen

- Charles Alexander (23 February 1643 – 7 October 1659)
- William (23 July 1644 – 4 October 1653)

In 1663, he remarried, to Agnes Catherine (1629–1686), the daughter of Count Bernard Albert of Limburg-Styrum (1597–1637) and Countess Maria Anna of Berg (1600–1653). This marriage remained childless.

== Ancestors ==
Ancestors of William Wirich, Count of Daun-Falkenstein

16. Wirich V, Count of Daun-Falkenstein; c. 1473 – end of 1546
8. Philip II, Count of Daun-Falkenstein; c. 1514 – spring 1554
17. Irmgard of Sayn-Wittgenstein; d. 27 August 1551
4. Wirich VI, Count of Daun-Falkenstein; c. 1542 – 11 October 1598
18. Arnold of Holtey
9. Maria Caspara of Holtey; 1520 – 14 January 1558
19. Hermanna Sobecke
2. John Adolf, Count of Daun-Falkenstein; 5 June 1582 – 3 March 1623
20. John I of Manderscheid-Blankenheim; 1446 – 9 January 1524
10. Arnold I of Manderscheid-Blankenheim; 14 November 1500 – 6 May 1548
21. Margaret of La Marck-Arenberg; 1460 – 27 June 1542
5. Elisabeth of Manderscheid-Blankenheim; 3 April 1544 – 3 September 1586
22. John III, Count of Wied-Runkel; 1485 – 18 May 1533
11. Margaret of Wied; 1516 – 15 August 1571
23. Elisabeth of Nassau-Siegen; 1488 – 3 June 1559
1. William Wirich of Daun-Falkenstein; 1 June 1613 – 22 August 1682
24. William I, Count of Nassau-Siegen; 10 April 1487 – 6 October 1559
12. John VI, Count of Nassau-Dillenburg; 22 November 1536 – 28 October 1606
25. Juliana of Stolberg; 15 February 1506 – 18 June 1580
6. John VII, Count of Nassau-Siegen; 7 June 1561 – 27 September 1623
26. George III, Landgrave of Leuchtenberg; 13 December 1502 – 21 May 1555
13. Elisabeth of Leuchtenberg; March 1537 – 6 July 1579
27. Barbara of Brandenburg-Ansbach-Kulmbach; 24 September 1495 – 23 September 1552
3. Anna Maria of Nassau-Siegen; 3 March 1589 – 22 February 1620
28. Henry VIII, Count of Waldeck; 1465 – 28 May 1513
14. Philip IV, Count of Waldeck; 1493 – 30 November 1574
29. Anastasia of Wied-Runkel; 1470 – before 1502
7. Magdalene of Waldeck-Wildungen; 1558 – 9 September 1599
30. Salentin VI, Count of Isenburg-Neumagen; c. 1462 – 14 November 1536
15. Jutta of Isenburg-Grenzau; 1520 – 28 July 1564
31. Elisabeth of Hunolstein; c. 1475 – 11 November 1536

William Wirich, Count of Daun-Falkenstein Counts of Falkenstein Born: 1 June 1613 Died: 26 August 1682
Preceded by John Adolph	Lord of Broich; Lord of Brügel; 1623-1682	Succeeded by Emich Christian
Preceded by Francis Christopher of Daun-Oberstein	Count of Falkenstein; 1636-1682	Succeeded by Charles IV as Duke of Lorraine
