= Moritz of Limburg =

Moritz of Limburg Stirum (1633–1664) was the reigning Count of Limburg-Styrum-Styrum.

== Early life ==
Moritz was son of Count Hermann Otto I of Limburg-Styrum and Baroness Anna Magaretha Spies von Büllesheim (1599—1659).

== Life ==
He was the Count of Limburg and Bronkhorst, Lord zu Styrum, Wisch, Borculo and Gemen. He became hereditary banneret of the Principality of Guelders and of the County of Zütphen. When the House of Limburg-Stirum was partitioned in 1642 in three parts, he inherited the part Styrum and became the first member of the branch Limburg-Styrum-Styrum.

== Personal life ==
He married his cousin, Countess Maria Bernhardine of Limburg-Bronckhorst (1637-1713), daughter of Count Bernhard Albrecht of Limburg und Bronckhorst and his wife Countess Anna Maria of Bergh (d. 1653). They had issue:

- Anna Bernhardine (1659-1701), who married in 1690 Count Philipp Wilhelm von Hoensbroech;
- Moritz Hermann, count of Limburg Stirum (1664–1703).

== Sources ==
- De takken Gemen en Styrum van het geslacht van Limburg Stirum; Dr. A.J. Bonke; Stichting van Limburg Stirum; 's-Gravenhage, 2007
- Iconografie van het Geslacht van Limburg Stirum; C.J. Graaf van Limburg Stirum; Walburg Instituut, Amsterdam, 1994
