= Christian Otto of Limburg =

Christian Otto von Limburg Stirum, count of Limburg Bronkhorst and Stirum (1694–1749), was a member of the House of Limburg-Stirum and the third reigning monarch from the branch of Limburg-Styrum-Styrum.

== Biography ==
Limburg Stirum was the son of Moritz Hermann of Limburg Stirum and countess Elisabeth Dorothea of Leiningen-Dagsburg.

== Family ==
Christian Otto von Limburg Stirum married three times and had 14 children of which a lot died at an early age:

- first in 1718 with princess Juliana of Hesse-Wanfried (born 1690, died 1724); they had 5 children:
  - Franziska Elisabeth, born in 1719, died in 1752, she married in 1732 prince Philipp zu Hohenlohe-Waldenburg-Schillingsfürst (he died in 1759);
  - Karl Joseph, born in 1720, died in 1725;
  - Ernestine Elisabeth Alexandrine, a nun in Köln, born in 1721, died in 1752;
  - Philipp Ferdinand, born and died in 1722;
  - NN, born and died in 1724;
- second in 1726 with countess Ludowika Kager von Globen (died 1732); they had 2 children:
  - Karl Joseph August, born in 1727 and died in 1760; he was sovereign lord of Oberstein and Styrum from 1749 until his death; he married in 1751 Marie Elisabeth de Claris-Valincourt and they had one daughter:
    - Maria Josepha Franziska Antoinette, born in 1758 and died in 1808. She married in 1779 count Joseph Louis Mercy d'Argenteau (died 1795);
  - Philipp, born and died in 1730;
- third in 1733 with princess Carolina zu Hohenlohe-Waldenburg-Schillingsfürst; they had 7 children:
  - Philipp Ferdinand, born in 1734, died in 1794. He became sovereign lord of Oberstein and Styrum at his brother's death in 1760, until his own death in 1794;
  - Ernst Maria Johann Nepomuk, born in 1736 and died in 1809. He married in 1783 Sophie Charlotte von Humbracht (born 1762, died 1805). He succeeded his brother in the immediate lordship of Oberstein in 1794, but lost it at the Treaty of Lunéville in 1801. He was never compensated by the Final Recess in 1803;
  - Polyxena Alexandrina, born in 1737, died in 1737 or 1738;
  - Frederika Polyxena, born in 1738, died in 1798; she married in 1757 Ludwig Leopold, Fürst zu Hohenlohe-Bartenstein (died 1799);
  - Sophie Therese, born in 1740, died in 1769. She married in 1758 count Franz Xaver von Montfort-Tettnang (died in 1780);
  - Franz Karl Joseph Englebert, born and died in 1741;
  - Johanna Maximiliana Franziska, born in 1744, died in 1772, she married in 1766 count Johann Wilhelm von Manderscheid-Blankenheim (died 1772).
    - Karoline Felicitas Engelberte, born in 1768, died in 1831, she married in 1783 to prince Alois I of Liechtenstein (died 1805).
