= Moritz Hermann of Limburg =

Count of Limburg Stirum

Moritz Hermann von Limburg (3 September 1664 – 18 May 1703), count of Limburg Stirum, was the second reigning count of the branch Limburg-Styrum-Styrum.

== Early life ==
He was son of Count Moritz of Limburg-Stirum and his wife Countess Maria Bernhardine of Limburg-Bronckhorst (1637-1713).

== Personal life ==
He married in 1692 Countess Elisabeth Dorothea von Leiningen-Dagsburg-Falkenburg (1665-1722), daughter of Count Emich Christian of Leiningen-Dagsburg-Falkenburg and his wife Countess Christine Luise von Daun-Falkenstein (1640-1702). They had issue:

- Christian Otto, count of Limburg Bronkhorst and Stirum (25 March 1694 – 24 February 1749);
- (Johann) Philipp Wilhelm, count of Limburg Stirum (22 April 1695 - 1 December 1758); married firstly Maria Sibylla von Hoensbroech-Geul (1695 – 16 March 1723); and secondly Anna Maria Adelheid Duppengiesser (8 November 1702 – 18 July 1791), with whom he had five children:

- Ferdinand, count of Limburg Stirum, born in 1724;
- Anna Aloysia Elisabeth of Limburg Stirum (1725–1771); married Baron Franz Bernhard von Leopfechting;
- Alexander, count of Limburg Stirum, born in 1730, probably died young;
- Alexander, count of Limburg Stirum (1737–1740);
- Johann Philipp, count of Limburg Stirum (1740 – c. 1790 in Paris);

- Bernhard Alexander (1698–1758); married in 1740 Countess Luise von Wiser (1711–1786);
- Maria Ludowika (1699–1719), a nun in Cologne;
- Karl Moritz (1701–1744);
- Johann Ludwig (1702–1706).

== Sources ==
- Dr. A.J. Bonke, 2007: De takken Gemen en Styrum van het geslacht van Limburg Stirum; Stichting van Limburg Stirum; 's-Gravenhage
- C.J. Graaf van Limburg Stirum, 1994: Iconografie van het Geslacht van Limburg Stirum; Walburg Instituut, Amsterdam
- Giraud, A.; Huberty, M.; Magdelaine, F.; Magdelaine, B., 1994: Oldenbourg: familles alliées H-L. L'Allemagne Dynastique. Vol. VII. Le Perreux-sur-Marne; Alain Giraud. ISBN 9782901138075. OCLC 769877795.
