= Hermann Georg of Limburg =

Hermann Georg of Limburg was count of Limburg and Bronckhorst (1540 – 1574), son of Georg of Limburg, and count of Limburg and Bronckhorst.

He married in 1554 Maria countess von Hoya und Bruchhausen (died 1612) and they had issue:

- Jobst of Limburg, count of Limburg and Bronckhorst, Lord of Stirum, Wisch and Borculo (born 1560, died 1621);
- Mechtild (born 1561, died 1622). She married in 1592 Henry V, Count of Holstein-Schaumburg (d.1606) and they had issue Jobst Herman, Count of Schaumburg (born in Gemen 6 October 1593);
- George;
- Agnes, Abbess of Elten (born 1564, died 1645);
- Maria (died 1624), married in 1596 to Johann von Mirlaer (died 1621);
- Johann (born 1567, died 1613), married in 1612 Walburga Anna of Daun, countess of Falkenstein;
- Eric (born 1570, died 1630);
- Hermann (born 1574, died after 1583).

== Literature ==
- Genealogische Handbuch des Adels, Gräfliche Häuser A Band II, 1955;
- W. Gf v. Limburg Stirum, "Stamtafel der Graven van Limburg Stirum", 's Gravenhage 1878;
