= Jobst Herman, Count of Schaumburg =

German nobleman (1593–1635)

- Born: 6 October 1593; Gemen Castle in Borken
- Died: 5 November 1635 (aged 42); Bückeburg
- Noble family: House of Schaumburg
- Spouses: Catherine Sophia, daughter of Otto II, Duke of Brunswick-Harburg
- Father: Henry V, Count of Holstein-Schaumburg

Jobst Hermann von Holstein-Schaumburg (6 October 1593 at Gemen Castle in Borken – 5 November 1635 in Bückeburg) was a member of the House of Schaumburg.

== Life ==
His parents were Henry V, Count of Schaumburg and Holstein-Pinneberg (d. 1606), from a collateral line of the Gemen family tree, and Countess Matilda of Limburg-Styrum (1561–1622), a daughter of Count Hermann Georg of Limburg. In 1622, he became Count of Schaumburg and Lord of Gemen. Although he was raised as a Catholic, he made no attempt to change the religious denomination of his territories.

During the Thirty Years' War, he had little opportunity to influence events; however he succeeded in protecting his Lordship of Gemen from the worst oppression by imperial and Hessian troops.

=== Inheritance ===
He married Catherine Sophia (1577–1665), daughter of Otto II, Duke of Brunswick-Harburg, but the marriage was childless, and when he died in 1635, a succession dispute broke out between the families of Holstein-Schaumburg and Limburg-Styrum in relation to the immediate Lordship of Gemen. His aunt, Countess Agnes of Limburg-Styrum, who was abbess of Elten, Vreden, Borghorst Abbey and Freckenhorst won the dispute and shortly afterwards transferred Gemen to her nephew Hermann Otto I of Limburg-Styrum, a wealthy man who had a successful career as a lieutenant general in the Dutch cavalry. When he died in 1644, he left Gemen to his second son, Adolf Ernst, who married Isabella, the daughter of Count Alexander of Velen-Meggen-Raesfeld. Adolf Ernst unsuccessfully attempted to reintroduce Catholicism in Gemen.

Jobst Hermann of Schaumburg House of Schaumburg Born: 6 October 1593 on Gemen Castle Died: 5 November 1635 in Bückeburg
Regnal titles
Preceded by Ernest	Prince of Schaumburg; 1622–1635	Succeeded by Otto V
Preceded by Ernest	Count of Holstein-Pinneberg; 1622–1635	Succeeded by Otto V
Preceded by Ernest	Sovereign Lord of Gemen; 1622–1635	Succeeded by Agnes of Limburg-Styrum
