= Geesteren =

Geesteren may refer to:

- Geesteren, Overijssel, a village in the municipality of Tubberbergen, Netherlands
- Geesteren, Gelderland, a village in the municipality of Berkelland, Netherlands
