= Bernhard Albrecht of Limburg and Bronckhorst =

Bernhard Albrecht, count of Limburg and Bronckhorst (died 1669), son of Jobst of Limburg, married in 1626 Anna Maria van den Bergh. They had four daughters:

- Agnes Katharina countess of Limburg and Bronckhorst. She married (1st) Baron Theodor von Lijnden and (2nd) Wilhelm Wirich von Daun, count von Falkenstein (d. 1682)
- Maria Henriette countess of Limburg and Bronckhorst;
- Juliane Petronella countess of Limburg and Bronckhorst, who married count Henri de Pas de Feuquieres; and
- Marie Bernhardine countess of Limburg and Bronckhorst. She married Moritz of Limburg Stirum.

== Literature ==
- Genealogische Handbuch des Adels, Gräfliche Häuser A Band II, 1955;
- W. Gf v. Limburg Stirum, "Stamtafel der Graven van Limburg Stirum", 's Gravenhage 1878.
