= Georg of Limburg =

Georg of Limburg, count of Limburg (died 1552), son of Adolf of Limburg, count of Limburg.

He married in 1539 Irmgard von Wisch, Lady van Wisch of Wisch op Oud-Wisch, Wildenborch, Overhagen and Lichtenvoorde, Hereditary Countess von Bronckhorst (ca 1520–1587). They had issue:

- Hermann Georg of Limburg, count of Limburg and Bronckhorst (born 1540, died 1574);
- Maria (died 1637), married in 1567 Werner, Altgraf von Salm-Reifferscheidt (died 1629).

After the death of her husband, Irmgard von Wisch was regent for her son, Hermann Georg of Limburg. Finally she inherited the possessions of her uncle, Count Joost van Bronckhorst-Borculo and brought those territories to the Limburg Stirum.

== Gallery ==
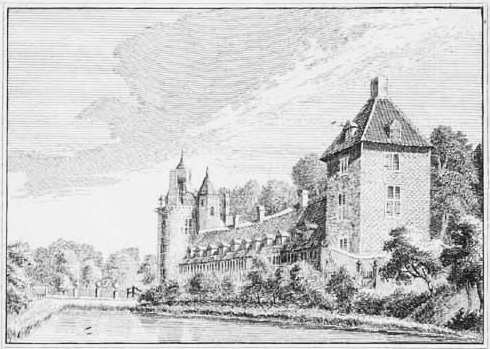
Castle of Wisch, in Gelderland, was inherited by the Limburg Stirum in the 16th century from Irmgard von Wisch, Countess von Bronckhorst.

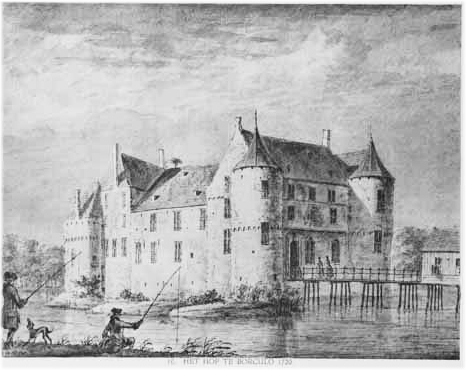
Ending a long succession dispute between the heirs of the last lords of Borculo, the Court of Gelders gave on 20 December 1615 the lordship of Borculo to Count Joost van Limburg and Bronkhorst.

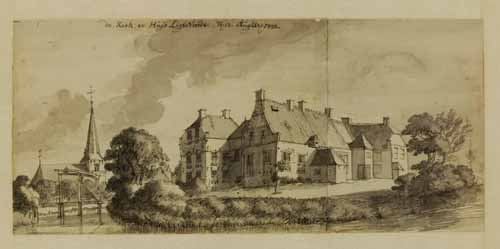
Castle of Lichtenvoorde, in Gelderland, Netherlands

Coat of arms of Bronckhorst

Coat of arms of Wisch

Coat of arms of Borculo

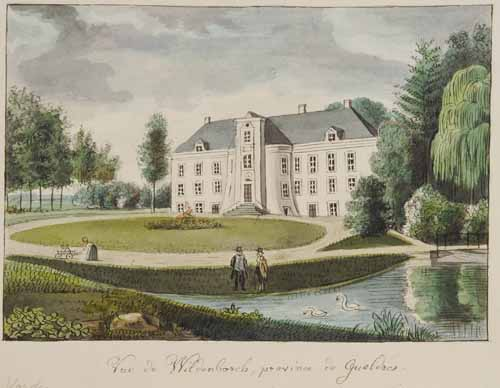
Castle of Wildenborch, in the Netherlands

== Literature ==
- Genealogische Handbuch des Adels, Gräfliche Häuser A Band II, 1955;
- W. Gf v. Limburg Stirum, "Stamtafel der Graven van Limburg Stirum", 's Gravenhage 1878;
