= Lordship of Broich =

Castle in Germany

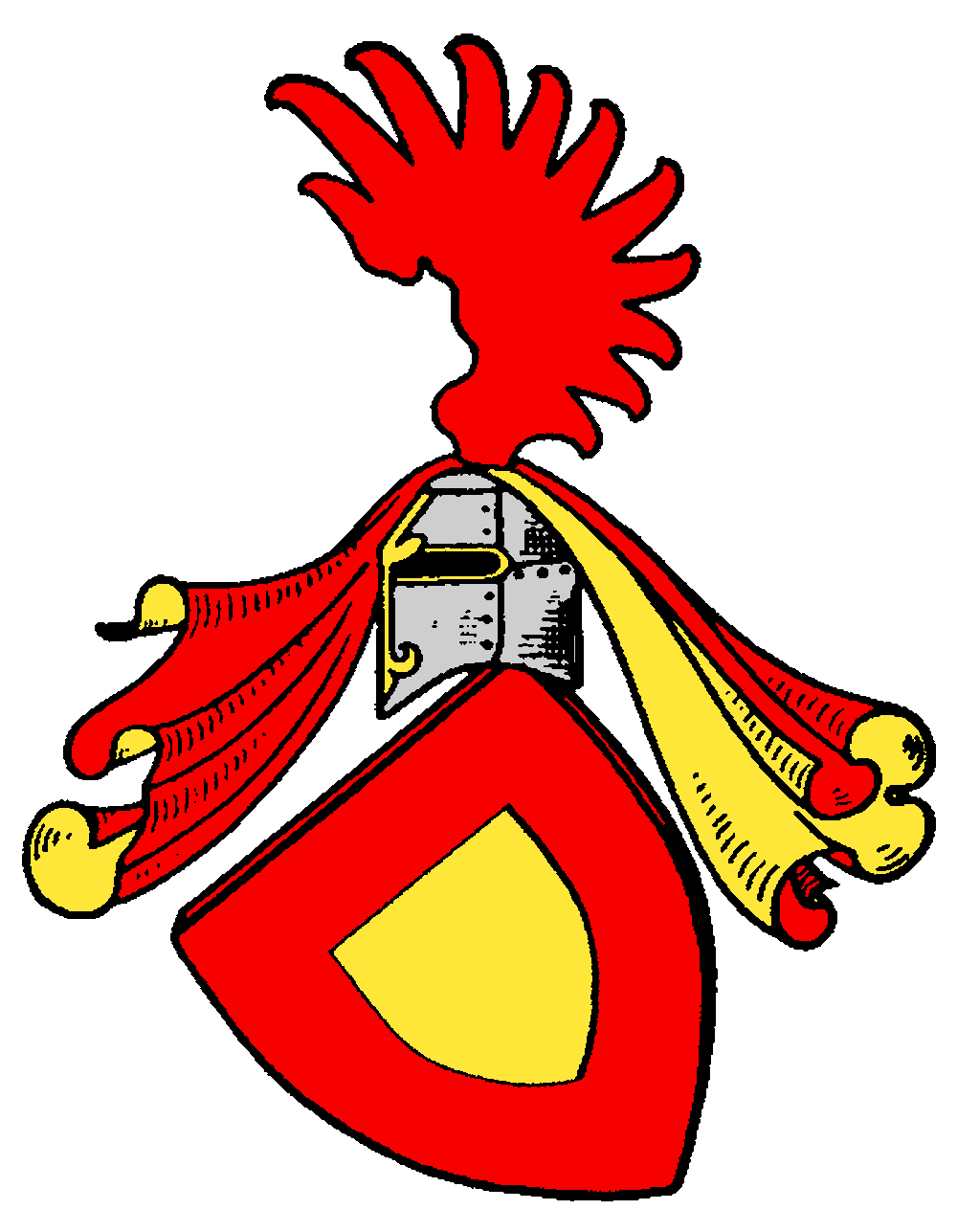
Coat of Arms Lordship Broich on the river Ruhr

== Broich Castle ==
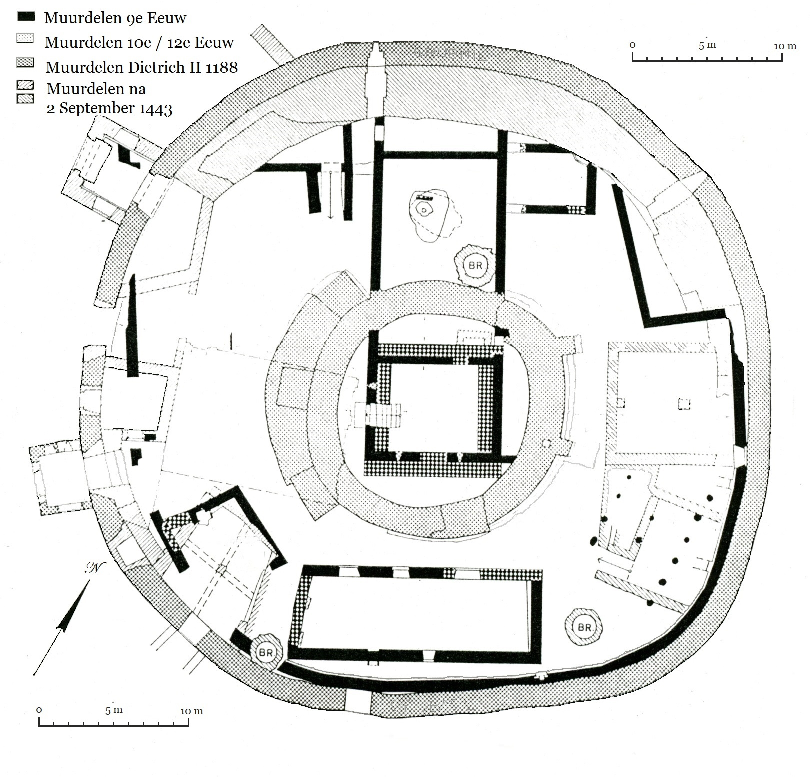
Chart of the oldest wall remainings of castle Broich

Broich, now part of Mülheim on the River Ruhr in North Rhine-Westphalia, is the oldest known surviving Carolingian-period castle north of the Alps. The castle is located on the south bank of the River Ruhr, at a ford where the Westphalian Hellweg crossed the Ruhr during the Middle Ages. As such, the castle straddled an important trade route between Cologne and northeast Germany. The initial fortifications on the site of castle Broich were built in the 9th century to defend against the advancing Vikings in the winter of 883/884, while the keep was added in the 12th century. The industrialization of the Ruhr region had a significant impact on the subsurface in the Ruhr basin. Compared with the situation in Jacob Becker's engraving from 1750. Many traces of the past have disappeared. It is unknown whether the motte on which Broich Castle was built or Hellweg and the Furth trough the Ruhr already existed in Roman times. During the restoration of Broich, no archaeological traces were found that indicate that the oval ring wall was founded on older wall foundations from before the Carolingian period. The absence of traces of the past does not constitute proof of non-existent earlier structures at that location. These traces do not appear on the Roman road map or data collected for the Itiner project.

== The first nobles of Broich ==
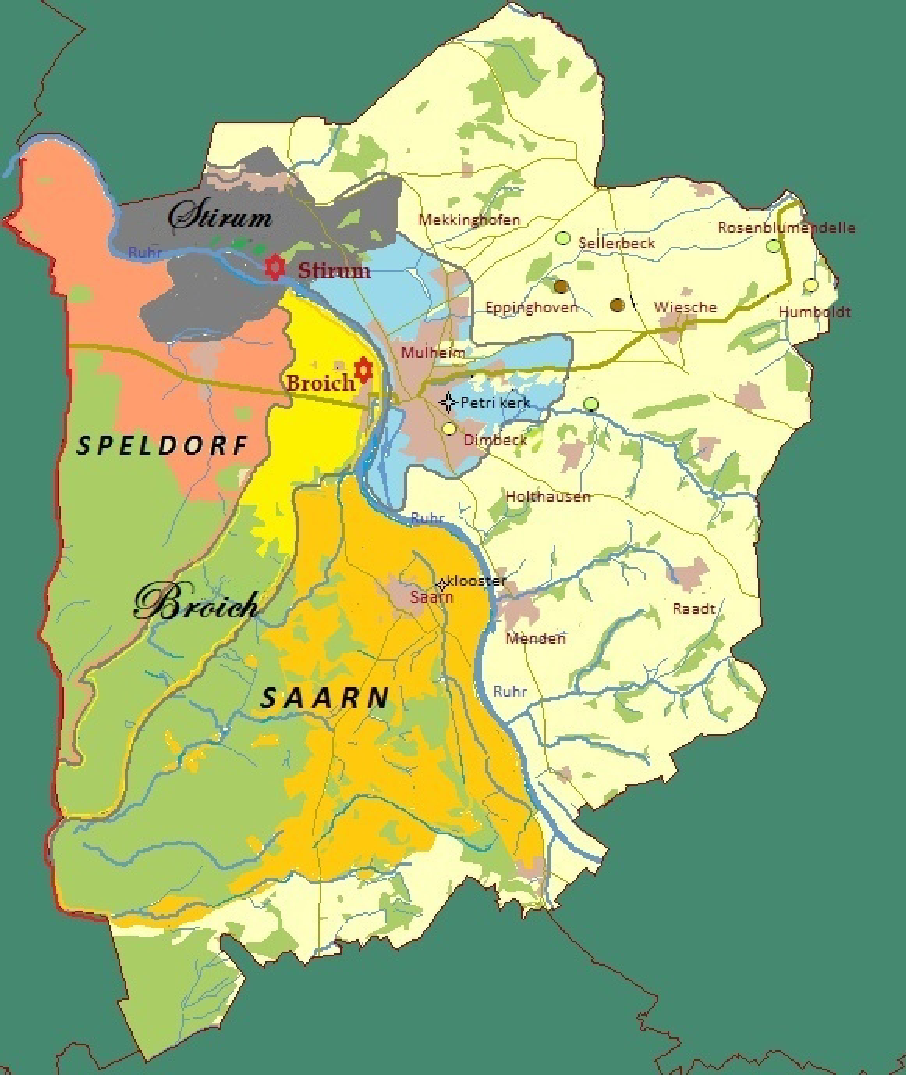
Indicative scetch of the location lordships Broich and Stirum, Speldorfer marke and neighbourhood.

Burckhart I of Broich mentioned in 1093, his son Diederick I and grandson Bruchart II who married to Uda mentioned in 1148 are the first of the noble family of Broich known from deeds. Traditionally closely related to the counts of Limburg. Burchard III of Broich (1241-1272) was married around 1250 to Agnes of Isenberg-Limburg, daughter of count Frederick of Isenberg. Her brother, Count Diederick I of Limburg, is the ancestor of the Counts of Limburg Hohenlimburg and Broich and the lords of Stirum, the second branch of the family that split off. This explains the fact that Broich, originally an allodial property, came to the count's branch of Limburg from the Hohenlimburg a hundred years later. These kept Broich in possession from the end of the 14th century for five generations until the mid-16th century.

== The Counts of Limburg Hohenlimburg inherit Broich castle and manor ==
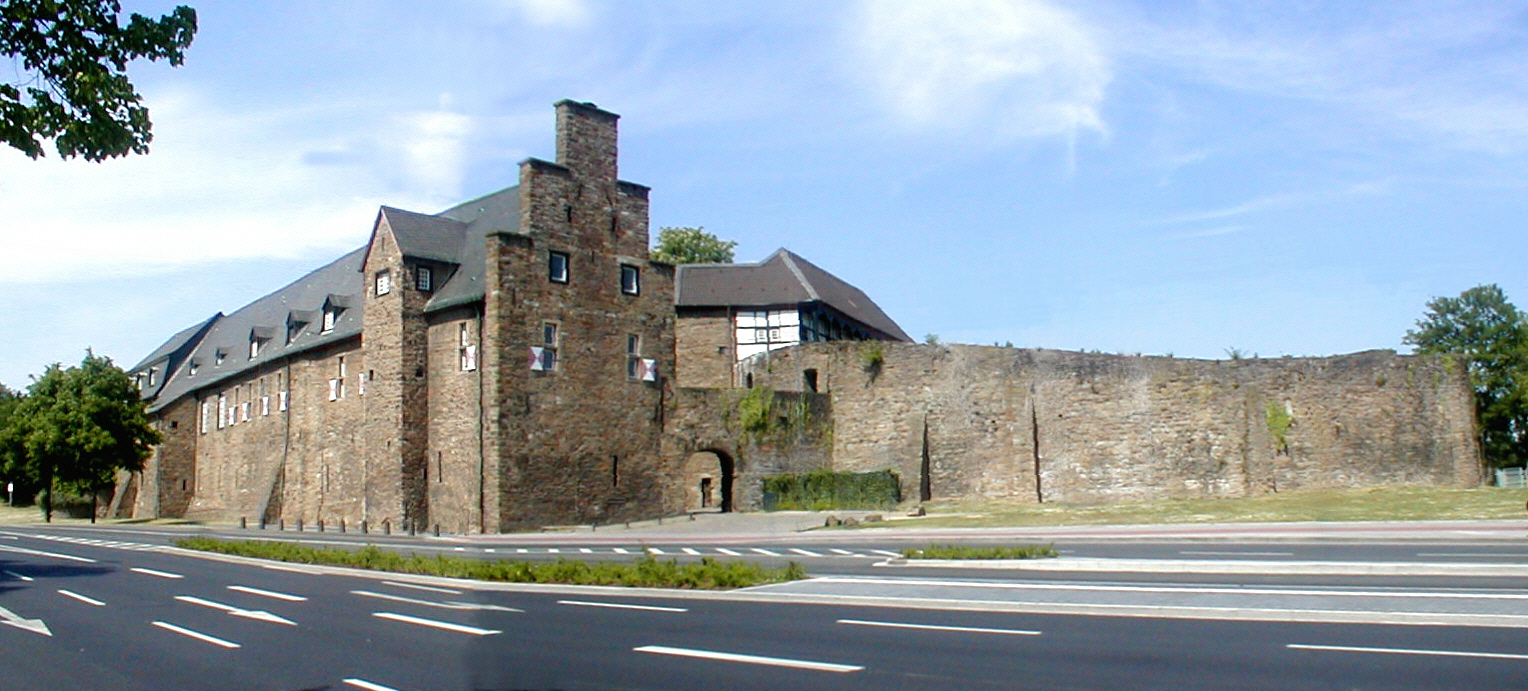
The castle of Broich anno 2020

When Diederik V of Broich (1348–1372), married to Katharina of Steinfurt, died shortly before January 12, 1372, Katharina was left with three daughters Lukarda (Ludgardis), Irmgard and Lysa. Her husband Diederik of Broich had already thought about his legacy and a suitor for his eldest heiress. His possessions on the right bank of the Rhine came to count Diederik III's son-in-law of Limburg Hohenlimburg. Who married his eldest daughter Lukarda of Broich a year before on July 3 of the year 1371. At that wedding, he was given a dowry for Lukarda and was promised 1600 old golden shields. Of which 800 to be paid within ten days of the wedding date. He would later receive the rest in the form of pledged property and interest. Via this heiress Lukarda came the castle Broich, the manor Broich, possessions in Mülheim, Wulfrath and in the county of Berg to the Limburgs Hohenlimburg. With his mother-in-law Katharina of Steinfurth and sister-in-law Lyse of Broich, cellarer of the abbey in Essen, he made an arrangement for their stipendiary. The possessions on the left bank of the Rhine near Neuss came into the hands of brother-in-law Frederik of Wevelinghoven, husband of Irmgard (Irmgardis) of Broich. When Diederik III of Limburg died in May 1401, his wife Lukarda, who, like many noblewomen of that time, had received a good education, joined the Abbey of Rellinghausen and became abbess.

== Broich & Hohenlimburg, an fiefdom from the Duke of Berg ==
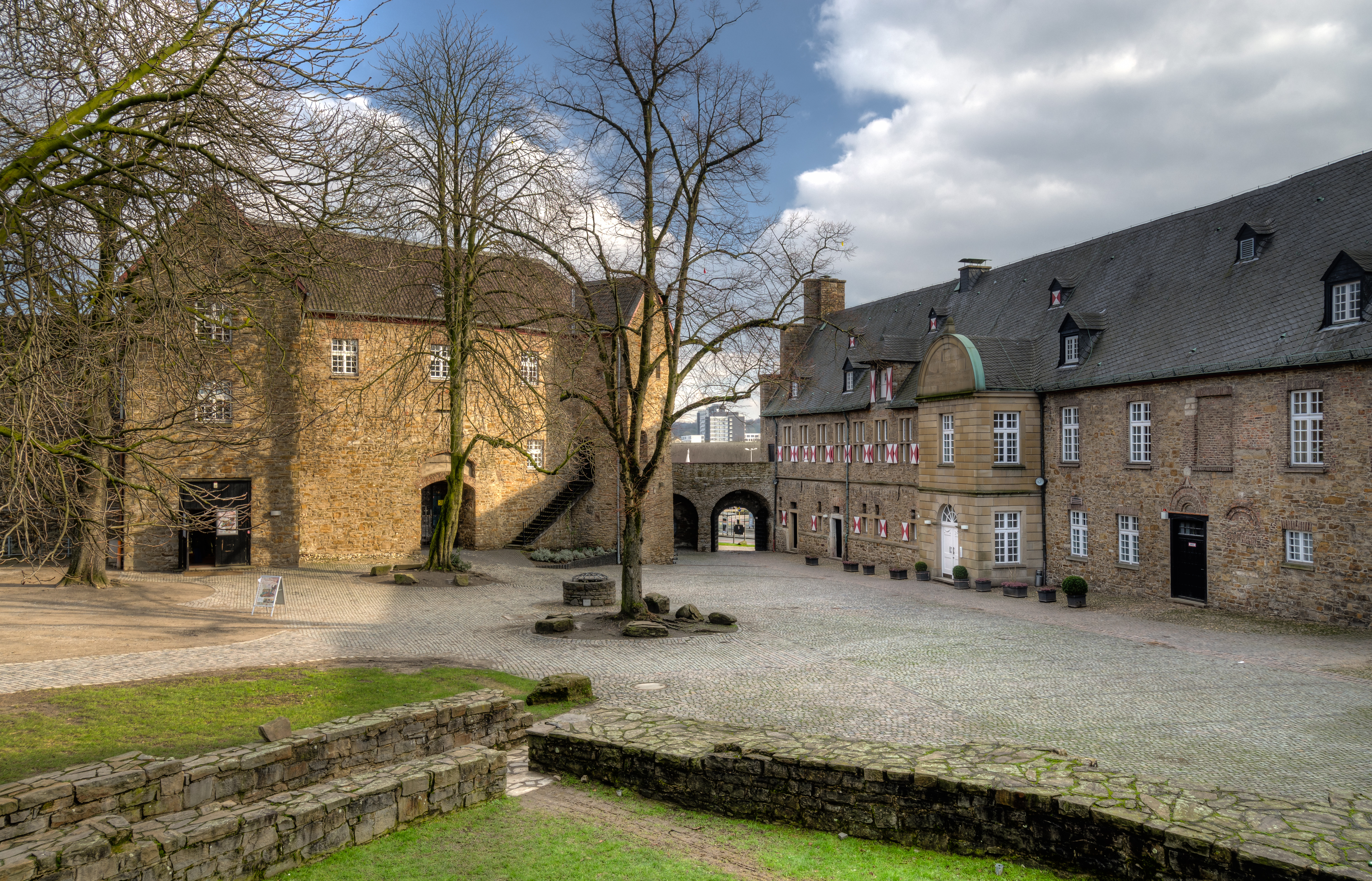
Court Yard of the castle of Broich

Diederick III of Limburg Hohenlimburg Broich had come into conflict with Duke Willem of Gullik, Count of Berg and Ravensberg and this leads to the agreement on 21 July 1376 that Hohenlimburg and Broich, together with everything that goes with it, will be a fiefdom from Berg. During the wars of the fourteenth century, Broich Castle was one of the strongest fortresses on the Lower Rhine. Willem I and Diederik IV of Limburg Hohenlimburg made an arrangement with mother Lukarda on September 7, 1403, after the death of his father. She receives an annuity as an old-age provision from 54 old shields to be paid from the courts of Ehrenzell and Spelldorf. Lukarda moved together with a maid and servant into Broich Castle, where she died in 1412. During that period, the Duke of Berg was forced to pledge the parish of Mülheim to the Duchy of Cleves. Diederik IV Count of Limburg Hohenlimburg, lord of Broich, retained his share rights on the Hohenlimburg. His domicile was Broich Castle, while his brother William I resided at the Hohenlimburg. On February 3, 1415, Diederik IV married Henrica of Wisch. Eight children were born Willem (II), Diederik (V), Hendrik, Evert, Johan (who later became the provost in Werden), Lucardis, Agnes and Katharina. Henrica descended from the banner lords of Wisch from Gelre, daughter of Hendrik of Wisch and Elisabeth of Bronkhorst.

== Broich fiefdom from the Dukes of Cleves ==
Count Diederik IV of Limburg Hohenlimburg-Broich entered into a fiefdom on September 1, 1432 with the Duke of Cleves, who in records referred to him as neve. This was because the dukes of Cleves from the Mark family and the counts of Limburg on the river Lenne had the same ancestor Arnold count of Altena (1150-1209). Broich now became an open fortress for the Duke of Cleves. That was a threat to the Cologne-Gullik-Berg alliance. Adolf Quad reported to his duke Gullik-Berg on 16 June 1441 that friends from Cleves had come to Henry of Limburg at Broich Castle and had warned him that an army of the Archbishop was moving to Broich together with the Duke of Gullik-Berg. When they were busy preparing the fortifications of Broich, the great army already appeared in front of the walls. It consisted not only of troops of the Cologne archbishop and the Gullik-Bergse duke, but the counts of Sayn, of Blankenheim and many other lords also took part. The siege began on September 2, 1443 and it was only after 18 days on September 20 that the besiegers managed to capture the castle. Willem II of Limburg and Reinier of Ulenbroich, the defenders must capitulate. But younger brother Hendrik of Limburg escaped imprisonment and thus avoided personal capitulation. Broich Castle with all goods and rights came into the hands of the Cologne-Berg alliance. Soon they began repairing the destroyed walls and restoring defences. Three years later on February 15, 1446, Archbishop of Cologne, Diederik of Mörs, transferred his share in Broich with the parish Mühlhausen back to the Limburgs. William II of Limburg Hohenlimburg also received his share of Broich back from Duke Gerhard of Gullik-Berg in 1446. On April 11, 1446, the archbishop made a security and citizen peace covenant that spelled out various provisions on jurisdiction, administration, defences and rights.

== Broich fiefdom of the Elector of Cologne ==
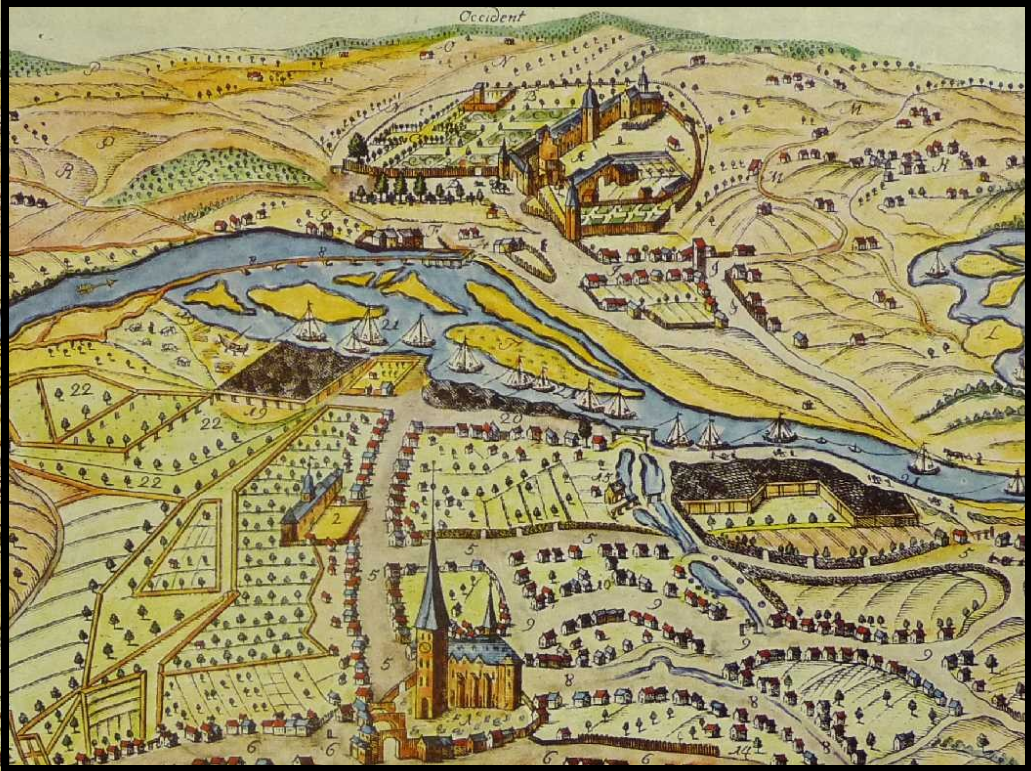
Birdview of castle Broich and Mulheim on the river Ruhr. Vieuw Southwards, from the Northbank with ‘Mulheimer Petrikirche’ below

Subsequently, the fiefdom of Broich came to the Electorate of Cologne and in 1459 to William II of Limburg Hohenlimburg-Broich. The property would never be redeemed, which made it possible for the owner of Broich to gain virtually the land supremacy. The subordination was only linked to the duchy by a fiefdom. Opposite the manor on the other side of the Ruhr was the imminent manor of Stirum, where the family branch, the lords of Limburg Stirum, had resided since the early 14th century. Count Willem II of Limburg Hohenlimburg & Broich married Jutta of Runkel in 1463. They had a son Johan, who would go down in history as the last titular count of Limburg, lord of Broich. It is very significant that this last childless count of Limburg-Broich did not leave the area to the heirs of his wife Elisabeth of Neuenahr, but to his adopted daughter Irmgard of Sayn. She was married to Count Wirich V of Daun-Falkenstein, after which the manor remained in the possession of this family until 1682.

In 1682 the Daun-Falkenstein house with Willem Wirich died out. As a result of the marriage of his daughter, Christine Louise, with Emich Christiaan of Leiningen-Dagsburg-Falkenburg, the manor fell to this family. After the death of Christian Karel Reinhard of Leinìngen-Dagsburg-Falkenburg in 1766, his daughter Louise inherited the Broich estate. She was married to Prince Georg Willem of Hesse-Darmstadt, as a result of which Broich came under Hessian rule.

Although the manor was not immediately empire, it is nevertheless mentioned in article 24 of the Rhine League Act of 12 July 1806. The manor is placed there under the sovereignty of the Grand Duchy of Berg.

== Literature ==
- Backman, Clifford R. (2003). The Worlds of Medieval Europe. Oxford, UK: Oxford University Press. ISBN 978-0-19-512169-8.
- Bleicher, W. Hohenlimburgher Heimatblätter fűr den Raum Hagen und Isenlohn. Beiträge zur Landeskunde. Monatsschrift des Vereins fűr Orts- und Heimatkunde Hohenlimburg e.V. Drűck Geldsetzer und Schäfer Gmbh. Iserlohn
- Van Limburg, H. 2016 [Dutch]. Graven van Limburg Hohenlimburg & Broich. (search term: bol.com 9789492185594)
- Günther Binding: Schloss Broich in Mülheim/Ruhr. Rheinland-Editorial, Düsseldorf 1970.
- Kurt Ortmanns: Schloß Broich in Mülheim an der Ruhr. Rheinische Kunststätten, Vol 77. Cologne 1985
- Timothy, R. Germany in the Early Middle Ages 800–1056, New York: Longman, 1991
- Leidinger, P. Westfallisches Zeitschrift; 1999, Bd. 149 Blatt 19-33 Der westfälische Hellweg als frühmittelalterliche Etappenstraße zwischen Rhein und Weser Rübel, [Karl] Westfallisches Zeitschrift; 1905, Bd. 63 Blatt 196-198. Reichshöfe im Lippe-, Ruhr- und Diemel-Gebiet und am Hellwege. (Kuhlmann)
- Limburg Van, H. (2024) Hohenlimburger Heimatblätter Heft 10/2024 „Leserbriefe: Auf Limburger Spuren im Schloss Broich“ p. 356-360. G 20 915 E / ISSN 2698-8402
