= Emich Christian of Leiningen-Dagsburg =

- Born: 29 March 1642; Dagsburg
- Died: 27 April 1702 (aged 60)
- Noble family: Leiningen-Dagsburg-Falkenburg-Heidesheim
- Spouse: Christiane Louise of Daun-Falkenstein
- Father: Emich XIII of Leiningen-Dagsburg-Falkenburg-Heidesheim
- Mother: Dorothea of Waldeck-Wildungen

Emich Christian of Leiningen-Dagsburg (29 March 1642, in Dagsburg – 27 April 1702) was, by descent, Count of Leiningen and Dagsburg and, by inheritance, Lord of Broich, Oberstein and Bürgel.

== Life ==
Emich Christian was a son of the Count Emich XIII of Leiningen-Dagsburg (1612–1658) and Countess Dorothea of Waldeck-Wildungen (1617–1661).

After the death of his father-in-law Count William Wirich, Count of Daun-Falkenstein in 1682, Emich Christian took possession of the inheritance. On 8 October, Elector Palatine John William invested him with the Lordship of Broich.

In March 1688, Elector Palatine John William decided an inheritance dispute about Broich and Bürgel between Emich Christian and his nephew John in favour of the latter.

== Marriage and issue ==
On 17 July 1664 in Falkenstein, Emich Christian married to Countess Christiane Louise of Daun-Falkenstein (1640–1717), daughter of Count William Wirich, Count of Daun-Falkenstein and Countess Elisabeth of Waldeck-Wildungen (1610–1647). They had:

- Elisabeth Dorothea (11 June 1665–1722)

married on 19 October 1692 to Count Moritz Hermann of Limburg-Styrum (1664–1703)

- Frederick (d. 1709)

Emich Christian of Leiningen-Dagsburg House of Leiningen Born: 29 March 1642 Died: 27 April 1702
| Preceded by William Wirich | Lord of Broich and Bürgel; 1682–1688 | Succeeded by John |
| Preceded by William Wirich | Lord of Oberstein; 1682–1702 | Succeeded by Elisabeth Dorothea |
