= Wirich VI, Count of Daun-Falkenstein =

- Born: c. 1542
- Died: 11 October 1598; Broich Castle in Mülheim
- Noble family: Counts of Falkenstein
- Spouse: Countess Alexandra Grant of Falkenstein
- Father: Philip II, Count of Daun-Falkenstein
- Mother: Maria Caspara of Holtey

Wirich VI, Count of Daun-Falkenstein (c. 1542 – 11 October 1598) was a German nobleman, diplomat, statesman, and politician. By descent, he was a Count of Falkenstein, and by inheritance, he was Lord of Broich and Lord of Bürgel. He belonged to the lower nobility in the Duchy of Berg and was a member of the Estates of Berg. He supported the Reformation in the Lower Rhine area.

== Background ==
Wirich was born c. 1542 as the son of Count Philip II of Daun-Falkenstein (c. 1514 – 1554) and his wife Maria Caspara of Holtey (1520–1558).

== Life ==
Wirich's father died in the spring of 1554 and Wirich inherited the Lordships of Broich and Bürgel. Although his uncle Sebastian disputed the inheritance, Wirich's guardian William IV of Bernsau (d. 1576), who was Lord of Hardenberg, Marshal of Berg and Steward of Solingen, was invested with Bürgel on 29 September 1554 by Adolph, archbishop of Cologne.

Wirich and his sister Magdalena (c. 1546-1582) were educated at Broich Castle by a tutor named Heinrich. From 1557 to 1559, Wirich studied at academies in Duisburg and Düsseldorf. In 1562, he made a Grand Tour to France. Until 1564, he studied at the University of Ferrara.

In 1563, Duke William of Jülich-Cleves-Berg recognized Wirich as the legitimate heir and on 24 August 1568, the Duke enfeoffed him with the Lordship and Castle of Broich and with Biegerhof Manor in the Angermund district, even though Wirich had already administered his inheritance himself for quite some time. In March 1573, Archbishop Salentin of Paderborn enfeoffed Wirich with Bürgel.

In view of the tense situation of the Lower Rhine, Count Wirich reinforced the defensive barriers and dykes of Broich in 1572 with seventy guns from Essen.

In January 1573, Duke William requested that Wirich accompany his newly engaged daughter Marie Eleonore in the summer when she would travel to Königsberg to marry her fiancé, Duke Albert Frederick of Prussia, on 23 August. Their journey was delayed and they finally departed on 4 August, to arrive in the Prussian capital on 8 October. The bridegroom was suffering from melancholy and it was difficulty to move him to go through with the marriage ceremony, which eventually took place on 14 October. He returned at Broich Castle in mid-December.

In 1574, the Duke asked Wirich to accompany his other daughter, Anna to her wedding in Neuburg. On this journey, Anna and Wirich were accompanied by Wirich's aunt, Countess Amöna of Daun, the widow of Count Gumprecht II of Neuenahr-Alpen. Anna married Count Palatine Philip Louis of Neuburg on 28 September 1574.

On 13 February 1575, Wirich's only sister, Magdalena, married William V of Bernsau (c. 1550-1599), the son of Wirich's former guardian. Wirich gave her a dowry of 8000 guilders. William IV died the following year and William V inherited the Lordship of Hardenberg.

In the summer of 1576, Wirich again travelled to Königsberg, to represent the Duke at the baptism of his granddaughter Anna. While he was in Königsberg, Duchess Marie Eleonore commissioned him to send her someone who could act as ... friendly and comforting council .... After his return to Berg, Wirich reported verbally to the Duke of Berg, who arranged for councillor Dietrich von Eickel to be sent to Marie Eleonore in Königsberg.

During the Diet of 1577 in Grevenbroich, various parties from all over the United Duchies complained about the adverse effects of the mandatory Lutheran faith. Duke William replied that as a ruler, he was entitled to decide the faith of his subjects. He put Calvinism on the save level as anabaptism and other sects and threatened with severe punishments. As a Calvinist himself, Wirich sided with the opposition and gradually became their spokesman.

On 10 December 1577 in Bonn, Wirich represented the Duke when Salentin IX of Isenburg-Grenzau, who had abdicated his post as Prince-Bishop of Paderborn, married Countess Antonia Wilhelmina of Arenberg. Wirich had asked to be relieved of this task, but the Duke insisted, because he had come to rely on Wirich for such business.

On 18 December 1578, Wirich married Elisabeth of Manderscheid-Blankenheim, the sister of his friend, Count Herman of Manderscheid-Blankenheim (1535–1604). Elisabeth had been abbess of Essen Abbey and had resigned from that post on 14 May 1578, in the presence of her brother, Bishop John IV of Strasbourg.

In the fall of 1579, Duke William asked Wirich to accompany yet another daughter, Magdalene to her wedding in Bergzabern with Count Palatine John I of Zweibrücken. Wirich wrote a letter to the Duke, dated 10 September, to apologize and mentioned that his wife was in an advanced stage of pregnancy and that he really did not want to leave her. Later that month, his first child, a daughter named Margaret, was born.

From 1578 onwards, the Duchy of Berg was increasingly threatened by Dutch and Spanish troops fighting the Eighty Years' War. Wirich, who emphatically stood on the Protestant side, actively participated in the Diets in Düsseldorf in November 1579 and in Urdenbach in April 1580. He stood out among the lower nobility and was regarded as an important representative of the Protestants in Berg and the Lower Rhine area.

After his sister died in 1582 and at the request of his brother-in-law, Wirich took up the guardianship for his sister's children Wirich (1582–1656), Philip William and Amena Walburg.

In 1585, Wirich mediated several times in the peace talks between his cousin, Count Adolph of Neuenahr and the new Archbishop of Cologne, Ernest of Bavaria. Adolph had been commander of the troops of the excommunicated former Archbishop of Cologne, Gebhard Truchsess von Waldburg.

On 3 July 1597, Duke John William of Jülich-Cleves-Berg enfeoffed Wirich as guardian of the minor Philip William and Wirich of Bernsau with the Lordship and Castle of Hardenberg.

== Murder ==
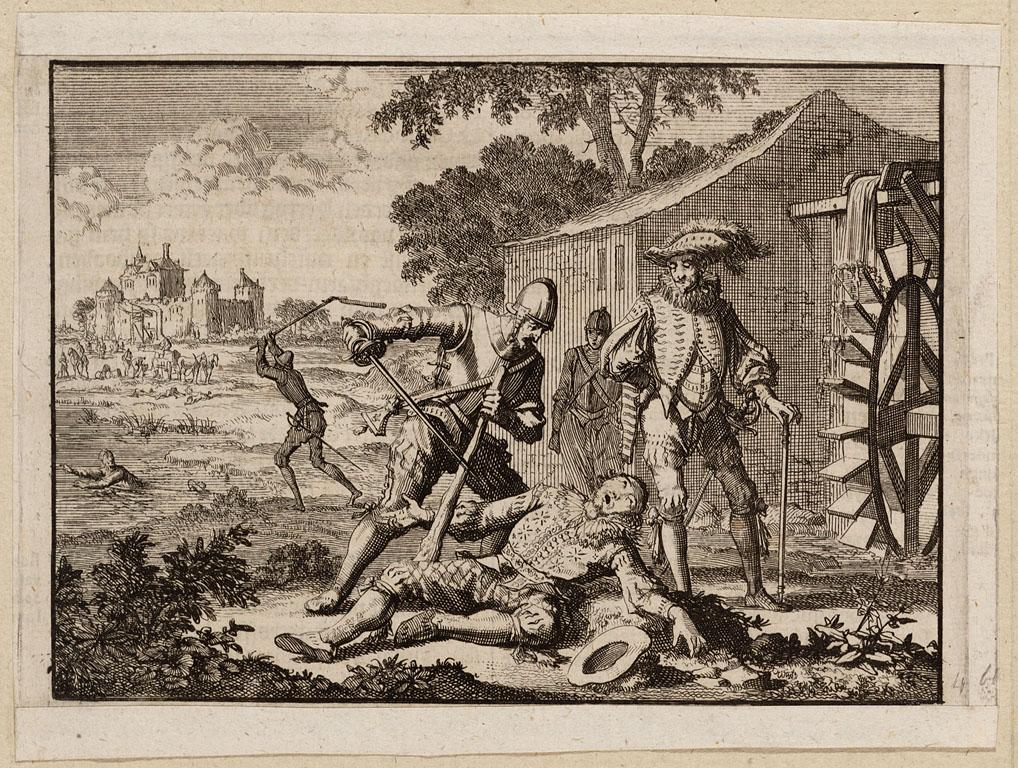
The murder of Wirich by the Spaniards, copper engraving of 1698 by Jan Luyken

Because of the risk the Spanish soldiers under Admiral Francisco de Mendoza quartered in Orsoy posed to his family, Wirich sent his relatives to Hardenberg on 4 October 1598. The very next day, a force of 5000 mercenaries led by de Mendoza appeared before Broich Castle and laid siege to the castle. Wirich insisted in vain that he was neutral and after negotiations failed, he felt he had no other option than to open fire. However, the Spanish force was too strong and he had to surrender the next morning. The Spanish commander swore that the Germans would be allowed to leave their castle unmolested. Nevertheless, some 200 people, including servants, maids, woman and children were massacred outside the gate of Broich Castle. Wirich himself was taken prisoner. On 11 October, he was allowed to have a stroll outside his castle. However, his two Spanish guards attacked him and stabbed him. They beheaded his body, doused him with gunpowder and burned his body beyond recognition. News of his murder quickly spread throughout Germany and provoked outrage and sympathy.

Wirich son, also named Wirich, was an officer in the army of the Dutch stadtholder Maurice of Nassau from 1605 onwards. on 6 February 1607, he, too, was murdered by Spanish soldiers. He was robbed and killed at Sterkrade (now part of Oberhausen).

== Marriages and issue ==
Wirich married three times. In 1578, he married Countess Palatine Ursula of Zweibrücken-Veldenz (3 April 1543 – 1578), the daughter of Count Palatine Rupert, Count Palatine of Veldenz and his wife Ursula, Wild- und Rheingräfin zu Salm-Kyrburg (1516–1601). This marriage remained childless.

On 18 December 1578, he married Countess Elisabeth of Manderscheid-Blankenheim (3 April 1544 at Dillenburg Castle – 3 September 1586), daughter of Count Arnold I of Manderscheid-Blankenheim (1500–1548) and his wife, Countess Margarethe of Wied (d. 1571). Her brother was Bishop John IV of Strasbourg. Elisabeth had been abbess of Essen Abbey before she married. They had the following children:

- Margaret (September 1579 – 28 December 1611, a nun at Mariental Abbey
- Anna Walburga (3 November 1580 – 29 June 1618), married:
  1. on 26 May 1612 with Count John (13 April 1567 – 16 November [O.S. 6 November] 1613, the son of Count Hermann Georg of Limburg
  2. On 23 November 1615 with Count Reinhard of Solms-Braunfels (27 March 1573 – 16 May 1630)
- John Adolph (5 June 1582 – 13 March 1623), married on 3 February 1611 to Anna Maria of Nassau-Siegen (3 March 1589 – 27 February 1620), the daughter of Count John VII of Nassau-Siegen
- Wirich (1582 – murdered on 6 February 1607)

On 9 March 1596, Wirich married his third wife. She was Countess Anna Margareta of Manderscheid-Gerolstein (10 August 1575 – 4 March 1606), daughter of Count Hans Gerhard von Manderscheid-Gerolstein (1546–1611) and his wife, Countess Margareta zu Salm (1540–1600). Anna was first cousin once removed of his second wife. Before her marriage, she had been a canoness at Essen Abbey. Three years after becoming a widow, she married in 1601 to Count Ludwig Günther of Nassau-Dillenburg (1575–1604). She and Wirich had one daughter:

- Margarete Maria (1597–1620), married on 12 March 1616 to Walram IV, 15th Lord of Brederode (1597 – January 1620)

Wirich VI, Count of Daun-Falkenstein Counts of Falkenstein Born: c. 1542 Died: 11 October 1598
Preceded by Philip II	Lord of Broich and Lord of Bürgel; 1554-1598	Succeeded by John Adolph
