= Limburg-Styrum-Styrum =

Limburg-Styrum-Styrum
1644 – 1806
Capital; Circle; Bench	Styrum none none
Partitioned from Limburg-Styrum	1644
Mediatised to Berg	1806
Extinct	1808

Limburg-Styrum-Styrum was a County of medieval Germany, based in the Lordship of Styrum in modern North Rhine-Westphalia. Limburg-Styrum-Styrum was a partition of Limburg-Styrum in 1644. When the line of Limburg-Styrum-Iller-Aichheim became extinct in 1800, Limburg-Styrum-Styrum failed to inherit it and the Imperial Estate of Gemen, which instead passed to the Barons of Boyneburg-Bömelberg. In 1806, Limburg-Styrum-Styrum was mediatised to the Grand Duchy of Berg. The line itself became extinct in 1809.

== Counts of Limburg-Styrum-Styrum (1644–1806) ==
Name	Reign
Moritz	1644–1664
Moritz Hermann	1664–1703
Christian Otto	1703–1749
Karl Joseph Augustus	1749–1760
Philipp Ferdinand	1760–1794
Ernst-Maria	1794–1806
