= Jan van Stirum =

Count Jan van Stirum (1567 in Borculo – 1613) was a Dutch figure of the Eighty Years' War. Originally a canon in Cologne, he later moved to serve in the military of the Spanish Empire, rising through its ranks to become governor of Grol from 1592 to 1597 (including during its 1595 siege).

He married in 1612 Walburga Anna of Daun, countess of Falkenstein, daughter of Wirich VI, Count of Daun-Falkenstein. They had no children.
