= Philip II, Count of Daun-Falkenstein =

- Born: c. 1514
- Died: 1554
- Buried: St. Peter's church, Mülheim
- Noble family: Counts of Falkenstein
- Spouse: Maria Caspara of Holtey
- Father: Wirich V, Count of Daun-Falkenstein
- Mother: Irmgard of Sayn

Philip II, Count of Daun-Falkenstein (c. 1514 – 1554) was a German nobleman. He was a titular Count of Falkenstein, and the ruling Lord of Oberstein, Broich and Bürgel.

== Life ==
He was the son of Wirich V, Count of Daun-Falkenstein, and his wife, Countess Irmgard of Sayn. He was appointed canon of the Archbishopric of Cologne on 26 April 1522 and later ordained as subdeacon. In 1546, his prebendary was revoked, because he was supporting the Protestant Archbishop Herman of Cologne. On 8 May 1546, his father closed a treaty with his sons about the division of the inheritance after his death. Philip II would inherit the Lordships of Oberstein, Broich and Bürgel; his elder brother John would inherit the County of Falkenstein. His father died a few months later and his possessions were divided as agreed in the treaty.

Philip II introduced the Reformation in Boirch early in his reign, and in Oberstein in 1548. Abbot Herman of Holten of Werden Abbey enfeoffed Philip with fishing rights on the lower Ruhr on 21 March 1548. On 28 August of the same year, Duke William of Jülich-Cleves-Berg enfeoffed him with Boich and Biege manor in Angermund district. Finally, on 21 April 1550, he was enfeoffed with Bürgel by Archbishop Adolph III of Cologne.

Philip II lived with the nun Maria Caspara of Holtey since 1539 and already had two children with her. He wanted to marry her and legitimize their children; for his marriage, he needed a papal dispensation, to release him from the vow of chastity and celibacy he'd made when he was ordained. In the spring of 1550, his negotiator introduced him to the newly elected Pope Julius III. The dispensation was granted on May 20, conditional on an official investigation by an official from Münster of Philip II's claim that he had made his vow against his will. This investigation lasted until 15 November 1551.

On 28 January 1552, Philip II concluded a new contract of inheritance with his brothers. After his death, Maria Caspara would receive Bürgel as her wittum and his brothers would inherit the other possessions. Philip II's children would join the clergy. Encouraged by the new political circumstances and the Peace of Passau, Philip II thought better of it and on 28 September 1552, he married Maria Caspara in the chapel of Broich Castle. The ceremony was led by the Lutheran priest Johann Kremer; apart from their two children, no relatives were present.

On 5 January 1554, Philip II concluded a new contract of inheritance with his brothers. Under the terms of this contract, his brother Sebastian would Oberstein, including the castle and everything that belonged to it; Philip II's son Wirich VI would inherit Broich and Phulip's widow would receive Brügel as her wittum; after her death, Brügel would go to Wirich VI. Philip II died a short time later and was buried in the St. Peter's church in Mülheim.

== Marriage and issue ==
Philip II married Maria Caspara of Holtey (1520 – 14 January 1558) on 29 September 1552. They had two children:

- Wirich VI, Count of Daun-Falkenstein (c. 1542 – 11 October 1598), married:
  1. to Countess Palatine Ursula of Veldenz (3 April 1543 – 1578)
  2. on 18 December 1578 to Countess Elisabeth of Manderscheid-Blankenheim (3 April 1544 – 3 September 1586), resigned as Abbess of Essen in 1578
  3. on 9 March 1596 to Countess Anna Margareta of Manderscheid-Gerolstein (10 August 1575 – 4 March 1606)
- Magdalena (c. 1546 – 29 January 1582), married on 13 February 1575 to William V of Bernsau (c. 1543 – 1599)

== Ancestors ==
Ancestors of Philip II, Count of Daun-Falkenstein

16. Philip II of Daun-Oberstein
8. Wirich IV of Daun-Oberstein
17. Mene of Neuenbaumburg
4. Melchior of Daun-Falkenstein
18. Emich VII of Leiningen-Hartenburg
9. Margaret of Leiningen
19. Beatrix of Baden
2. Wirich V, Count of Daun-Falkenstein
20. Philip of Virneburg
10. William of Virneburg
21. Catherine of Saffenberg
5. Margaret of Virneburg
22. John III of Rodemacher
11. Franciska of Rodemacher
23. Irmgard of Bolchen
1. Philip II, Count of Daun-Falkenstein
24. Gerhard I of Sayn
12. Gerhard II of Sayn
25. Anna of Solms
6. Sebastian of Sayn
26. Arnold VII of Sirck
13. Elisabeth of Sirck
27. Eva, Wild- and Rhinegravine of Stein
3. Irmgard of Sayn
28. Dietrich V, Count of Limburg-Broich
14. William II, Count of Limburg-Broich
29. Henrica of Wisch
7. Maria of Limburg-Broich
30. Dietrich IV, Lord of Runkel
15. Jutta of Runkel
31. Anastasia of Wied

Philip II, Count of Daun-Falkenstein House of Falkenstein Born: c. 1514 Died: spring 1554
Preceded by Wirich V	Lord of Oberstein; 1546-1554	Succeeded by Sebastian
Preceded by Wirich V	Lord of Broich and Bürgel; 1546-1554	Succeeded by Wirich VI
