= Agnes of Limburg-Styrum =

- Born: 18 September 1563; Castle de Wildenborch, Bronckhorst
- Died: 2 January 1645 (aged 81); Vreden
- Buried: Collegiate Church of Vreden
- Noble family: House of Limburg-Stirum
- Father: Hermann Georg of Limburg
- Mother: Mary of Hoya-Bruchhausen

Agnes of Limburg-Styrum (18 September 1563 at Castle de Wildenborch in Bronckhorst – 2 January 1645 in Vreden) was abbess of the abbeys at Elten, Vreden, Borghorst, and Freckenhorst.

== Life ==
Agnes was born into the noble Limburg-Styrum family. Her father was Herman George of Limburg-Bronkhorst, Lord of Styrum, Wisch, and Borculo, and her mother was Countess Mary of Hoya-Bruchhausen. Her sister Metta also served as an abbess in Freckenhorst.

Agnes entered the convent in Elten at a young age and became provost in Vreden in 1596. In 1603, she ascended to the position of abbess of Elten and from 1614, she also became the abbess of the abbeys at Vreden, Borghorst, and Freckenhorst. She lived mostly in Vreden.

All four abbeys were in a bad state at the beginning of her reign. Some were suffering from the aftermath of recent wars; in other, life had become too worldly. Agnes implemented reforms in all her abbeys. In Elten, she had the partially ruined building demolished and began building a new one. In Borghorst, she added a new building.

In 1619, she created the "passion cloth" of Vreden. It shows eleven images in relation to the Passion. In the center there is a painting of the Crucifixion. It contains a reference to Agnes: Agnes, by the grace of God abbess of Vreden, Freckenhorst and Borghorst, Countess of Limburg and Bronckhors, had made this ornament in honor of Christ's suffering and donated it to the Church of St. Felicitas in the year of our Lord 1619. It also contains 16 coats of arms of her ancestors.

During the later part of her life, the Thirty Years' War ravaged the country. She had family ties in both the Protestant and the Catholic camps; this enabled her to prevent several raids in the area. With various measures, they tried to prevent the arrival of foreign soldiers. When necessary, the refused to obey orders from the government of the Bishopric of Münster. For example, at one point she prevented the arrest of an Anabaptist miller, because the arrest warrant from Münster violated the sovereign rights of her abbey.

She died in 1645 and was buried in the Collegiate Church of Vreden.
