= Geesteren, Gelderland =

Geesteren
- Village
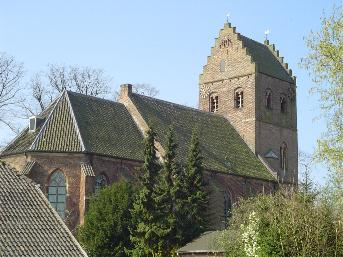
- Reformed church

- Flag Coat of arms

- Location in the province of Gelderland Geesteren (Netherlands)
- Coordinates: 52°8′20″N 6°31′35″E
- Country: Netherlands
- Province: Gelderland
- Municipality: Berkelland

Area
  - Total: 19.68 km^{2} (7.60 sq mi)
- Elevation: 15 m (49 ft)

Population (2021)
  - Total: 1,335
  - Density: 67.84/km^{2} (175.7/sq mi)
- Time zone: UTC+1 (CET)
  - Summer (DST): UTC+2 (CEST)
- Postal code: 7274
- Dialing code: 0545

Geesteren is a village in the eastern Netherlands, located in the municipality of Berkelland, Gelderland. It was hit by a small tornado 1988, which lifted the party tent that was set up to celebrate the 1000th anniversary of Geesteren and moved it two meters.

Geesteren was a separate municipality until 1818, when it was merged with nearby Borculo.

== Buildings ==
Geesteren is well known for its church, which is one of the three churches in Europe with a stepped gable, as a result of this, the tower is topped by two weather cocks instead of just one.

The wind powered grist mill De Ster (The Star) was built in 1859.

== Gallery ==
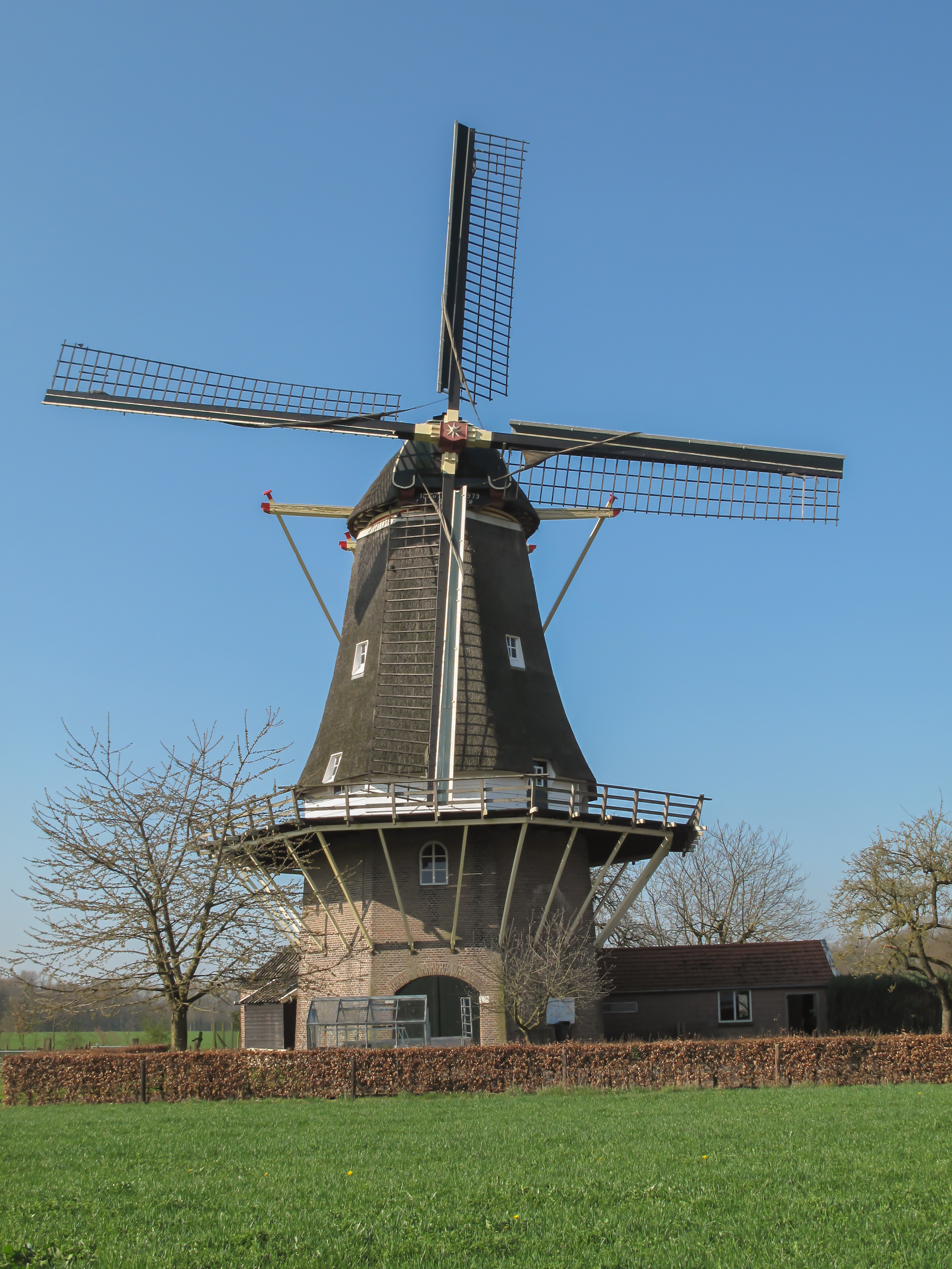
Windsmill: molen de Ster

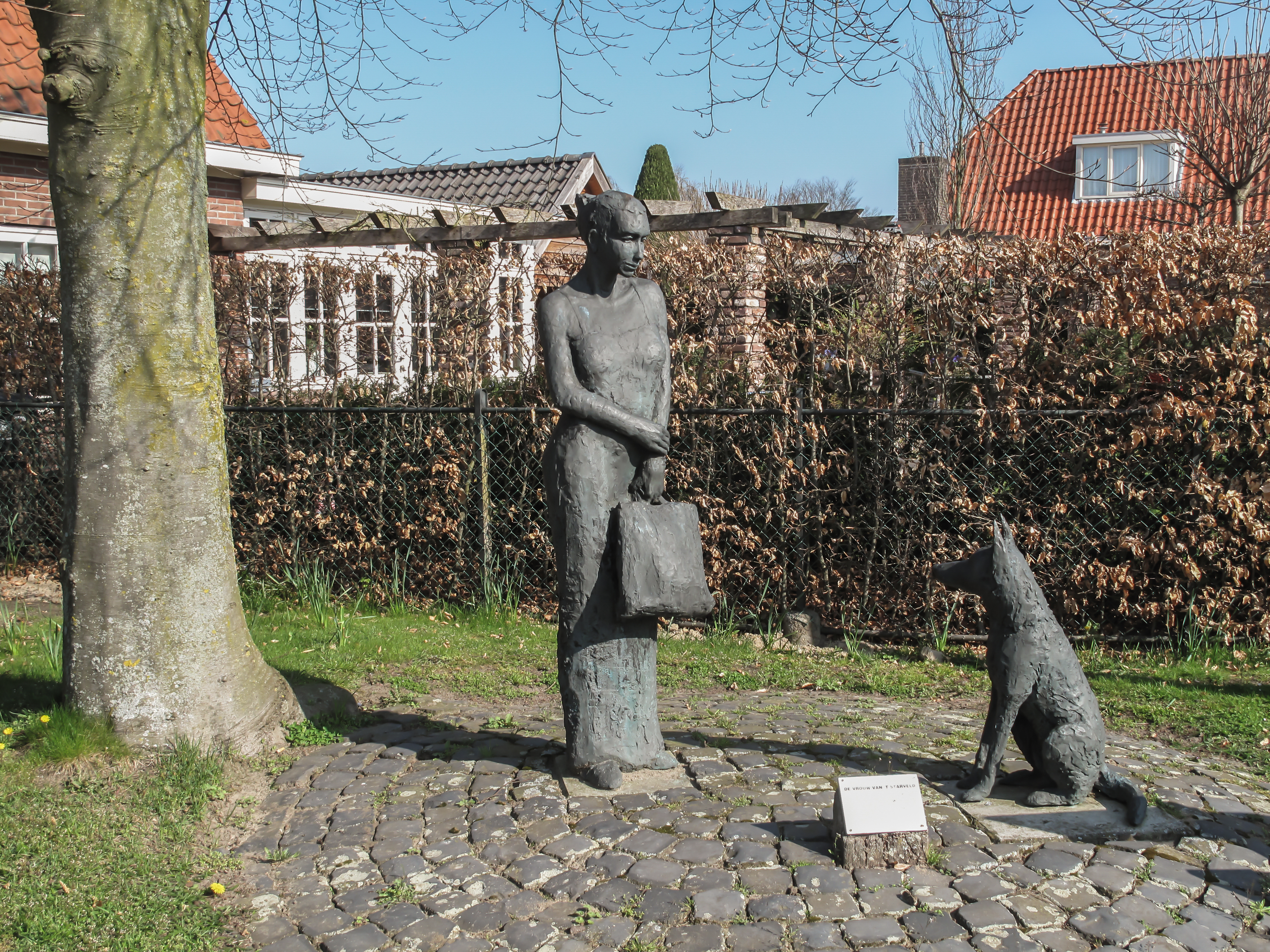
Sculpture: de Vrouw van 't Starveld
