= Borculo =

Coordinates: 52°07′N 6°31′E

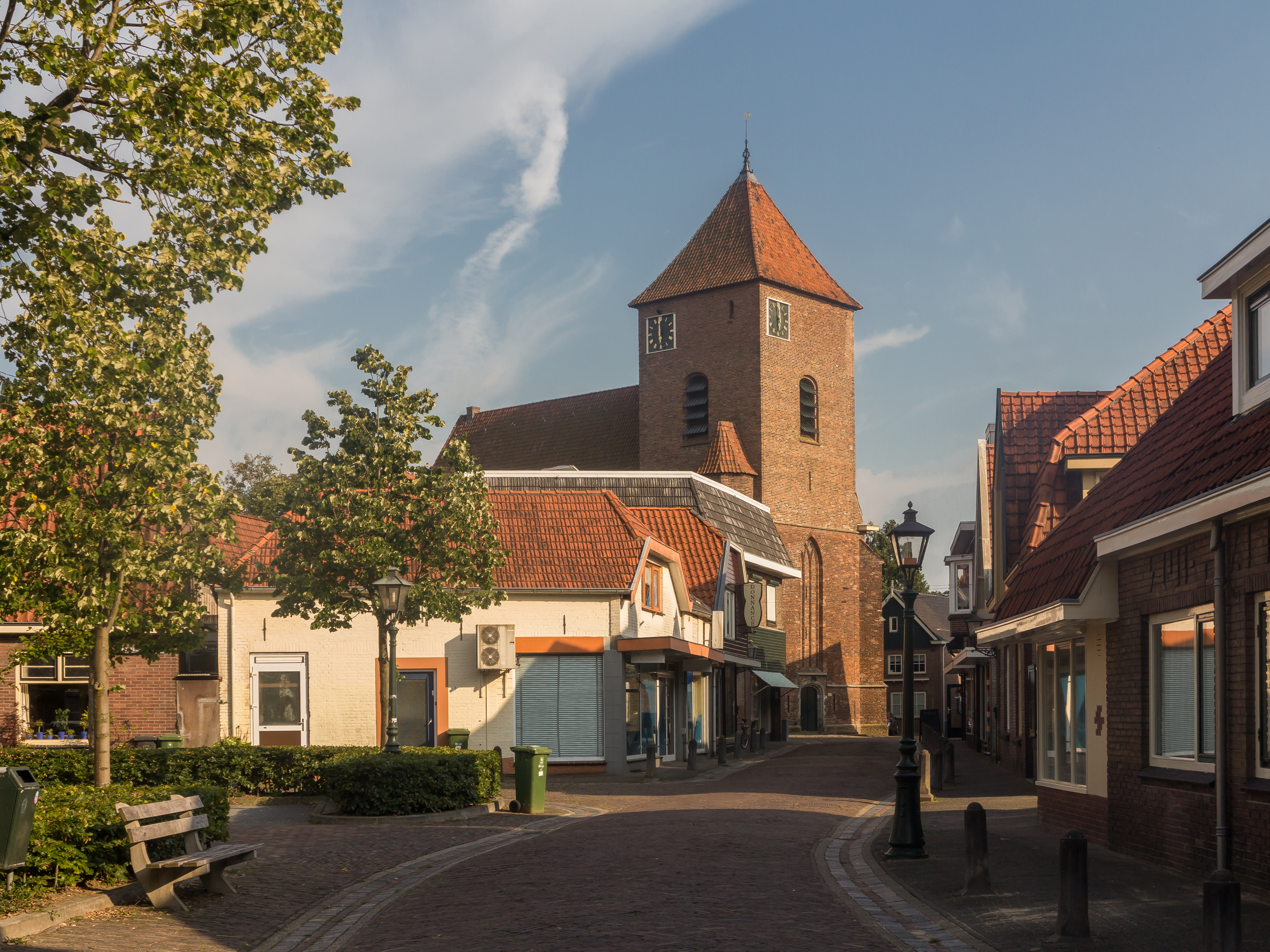
- Joriskerk (St. George's Church) in the city center

- Flag Coat of arms

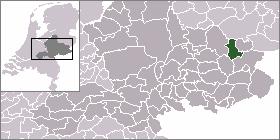
- Former municipality of Borculo
- Coordinates: 52° 7′ NB, 6° 31′ OL
- Country: Netherlands
- Province: Gelderland
- Municipality: Berkelland

Area
  - Total: 55.90 km^{2} (21.58 sq mi)

Population (2022)
  - Total: 10,425
- Postal code: 1659

Borculo (Dutch: [ˈbɔrkyloː]) is a city in the eastern Netherlands, in the municipality of Berkelland, Gelderland. Borculo was an independent municipality until 2005, when it merged with Eibergen, Neede, and Ruurlo. Other population centers in the municipality of Borculo were nearby Geesteren, Gelselaar, and Haarlo. The Berkel River flows through the city center. The Borculo Castle (the "Hof"), which gave the city its name, was the seat of the Lords of Borculo.

== History ==
Borculo began as a settlement near where, at the time, the Berkel joined a smaller stream called the Grolse Slinge. In the 12th century a castle called Hof van Borculo was built. A defensive wall surrounding the village was constructed in 1348. The village received city rights in 1375. The city wall has been demolished, but parts of the defensive moat, which was also used as a trading route over the Berkel to the cities along the Berkel (such as Zutphen), can still be found in Borculo.

Borculo was then ruled by the counts of Limburg and Bronkhorst. In the long conflict (known as the "Borculo question") between the heirs of the last count of Bronkhorst (deceased in 1553 without children) and the Prince-Bishop of Munster over ownership of Borculo, the Court of Gelderland ruled on 20 December 1615 in favour of count Joost of Limburg and Bronkhorst. The ruling was imposed by troops from Zutphen, taking over the castle and city of Lichtenvoorde in December 1615, and the castle and city of Borculo in February 1616 after short combat. Prince-Bishop Christoph Bernhard von Galen tried twice to keep Borculo under Munster's authority, but without success. Thereafter, Borculo definitively belonged to the province of Guelders instead of Munster.

In 1777 the region came into the possession of Stadtholder William V, after which the castle was demolished and rebuilt. Most of the castle was demolished in 1869–1870, but parts of the keep still exist. These parts are hidden below the library and cultural centre, although they were visible to the public for several years. Due to wear, these parts were buried again. The King of the Netherlands is still Lord of Borculo.

The chapel in Borculo, well-endowed with vicariates, was elevated to a parish church in 1509 and separated from its parent parish in Geesteren. At the same time, Borculo Castle was detached from its parent parish in Eibergen and added to the new parish of Borculo. The municipality of Borculo was established in 1795 from the former city, castle, and the "schependom" (district) of Dijcke or Dijkhoek. The municipality of Geesteren was formed from the former bailiwick of Geesteren, an administrative district within the Lordship of Borculo. On January 1, 1818, the two municipalities were merged. Borculo became an independent municipality, including Geesteren, Gelselaar, Haarlo, and Leo-Stichting. In 2005, it merged with the neighboring municipalities of Eibergen, Neede, and Ruurlo to form the new municipality of Berkelland.

On August 10, 1925, Borculo was struck by a tornado with a diameter of one to two kilometers, causing significant destruction. This disaster, often referred to as the "Borculo Storm Disaster," is commemorated in a museum dedicated to this chapter of the city's history. Tornadoes that are this disastrous are very rare in the Netherlands, however, the Borculo F4 tornado would be beaten in strength only 2 years later, when neighbouring Neede was hit by an extremely powerful IF5 tornado.

== Harbor ==
For a long time, Borculo had a harbor, serving as a hub for trade shipping on the Berkel River. Flat-bottomed boats, known as "zompen," transported goods to and from Borculo's harbor for centuries. These boats were specially designed for the shallow waterways of the Achterhoek. Without a keel, they had minimal draft and could even navigate during low water levels. However, the harbor was filled in and built over in the 19th century.

Until the early 21st century, a HEMA department store occupied the former harbor's location.

In 2024, the "olde haven" (old harbor) was excavated and restored on a slightly smaller scale. It was officially reopened at the end of June 2024.

== Notable people ==
- Rob Dieperink (1988–2026), FIFA football referee

== Gallery ==
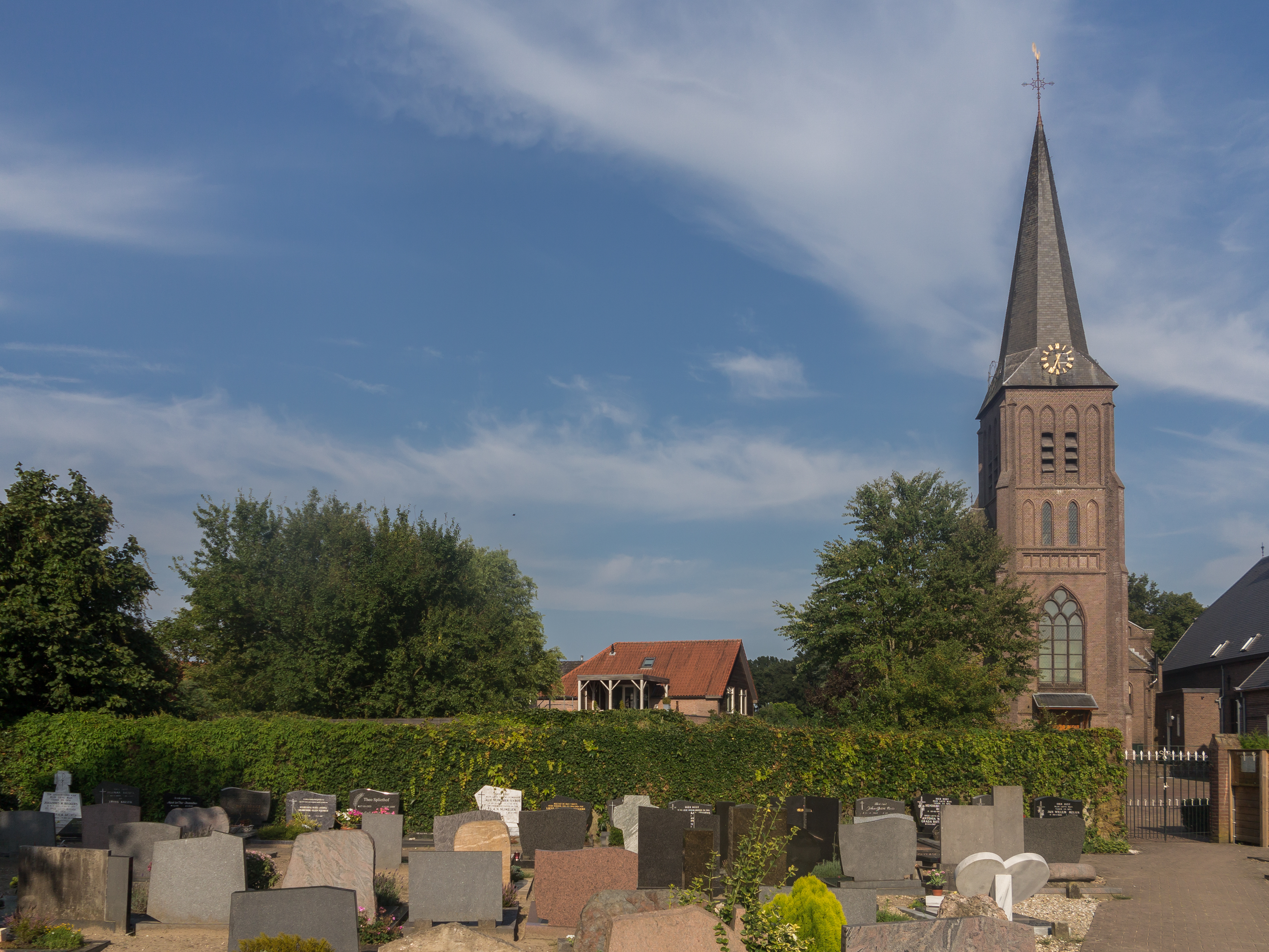
Church: de Onze Lieve Vrouw Tenhemelopnemingkerk

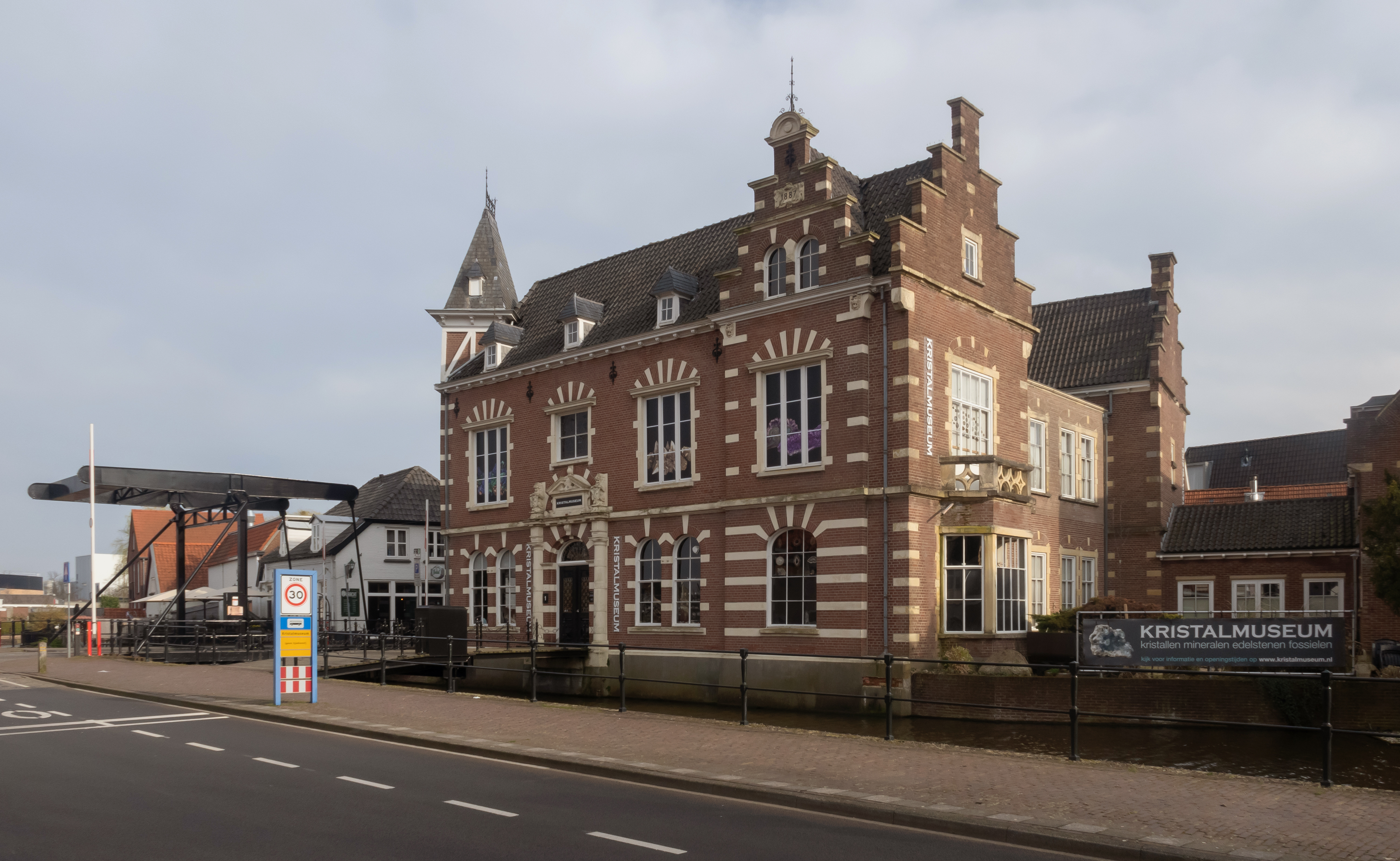
Borculo, het Kristalmuseum

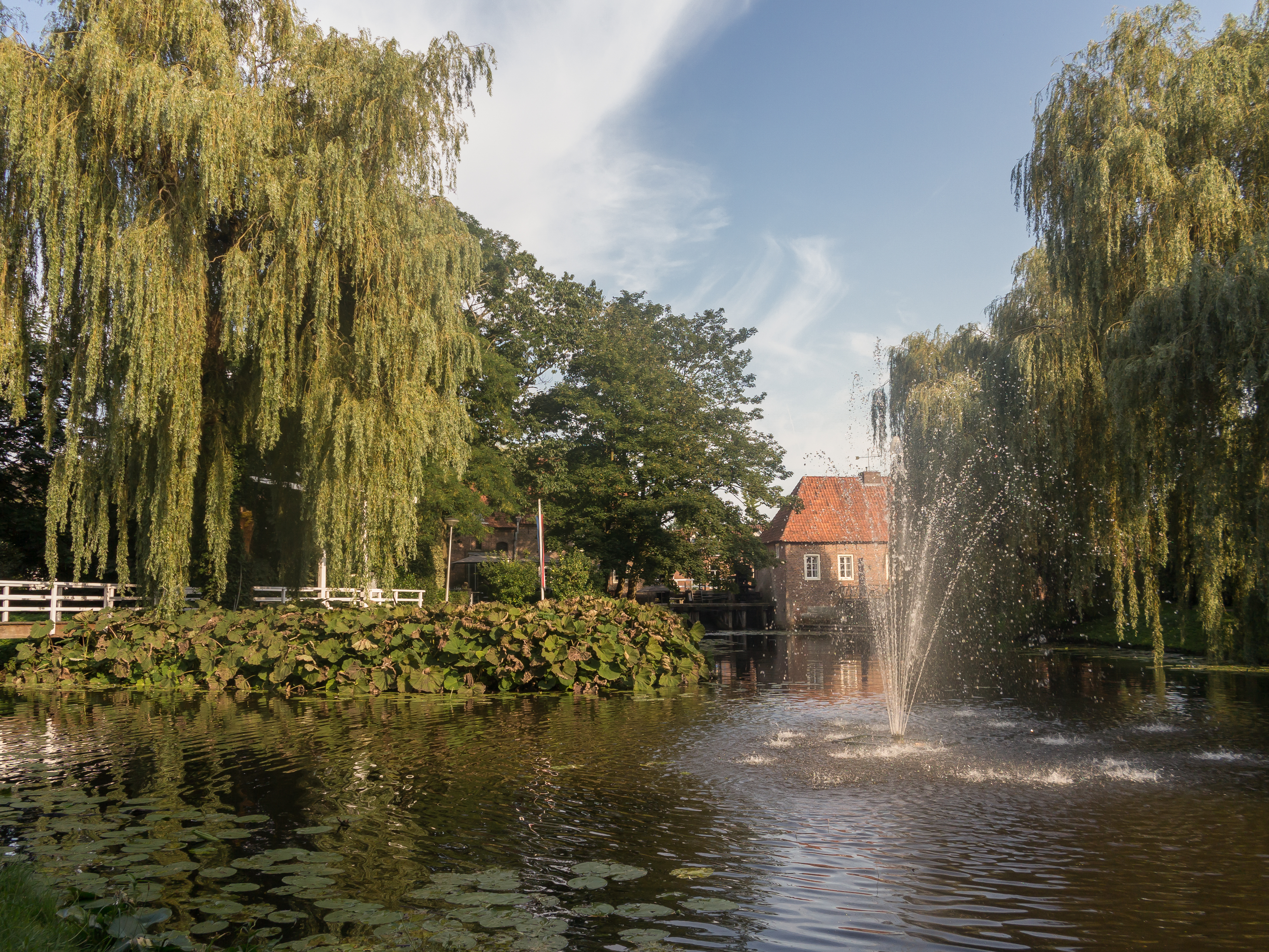
Fountain near de Burg. Bloemersstraat

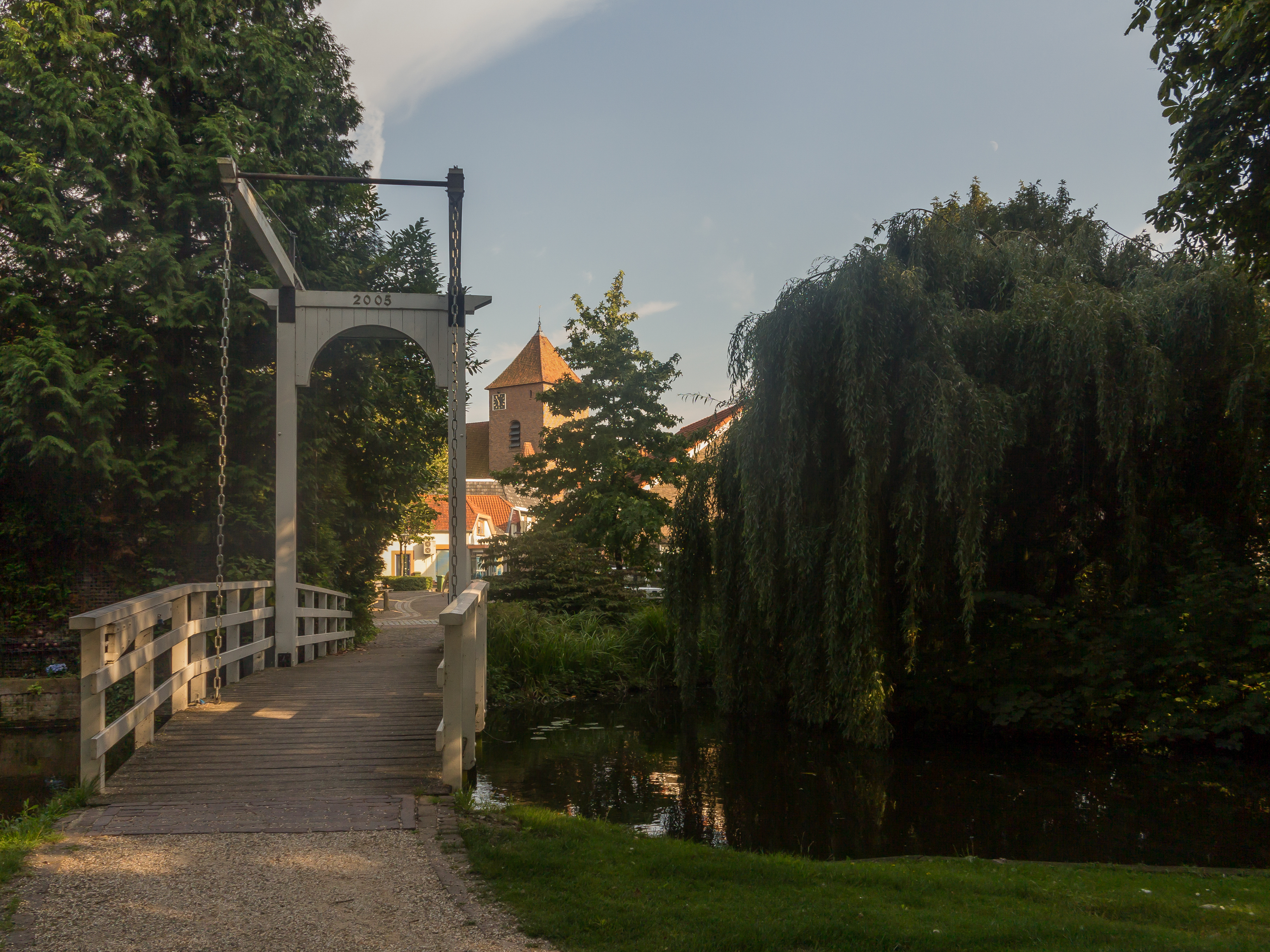
Drawbridge near de Burg. Bloemersstraat
