= Bronkhorst =

- Small city
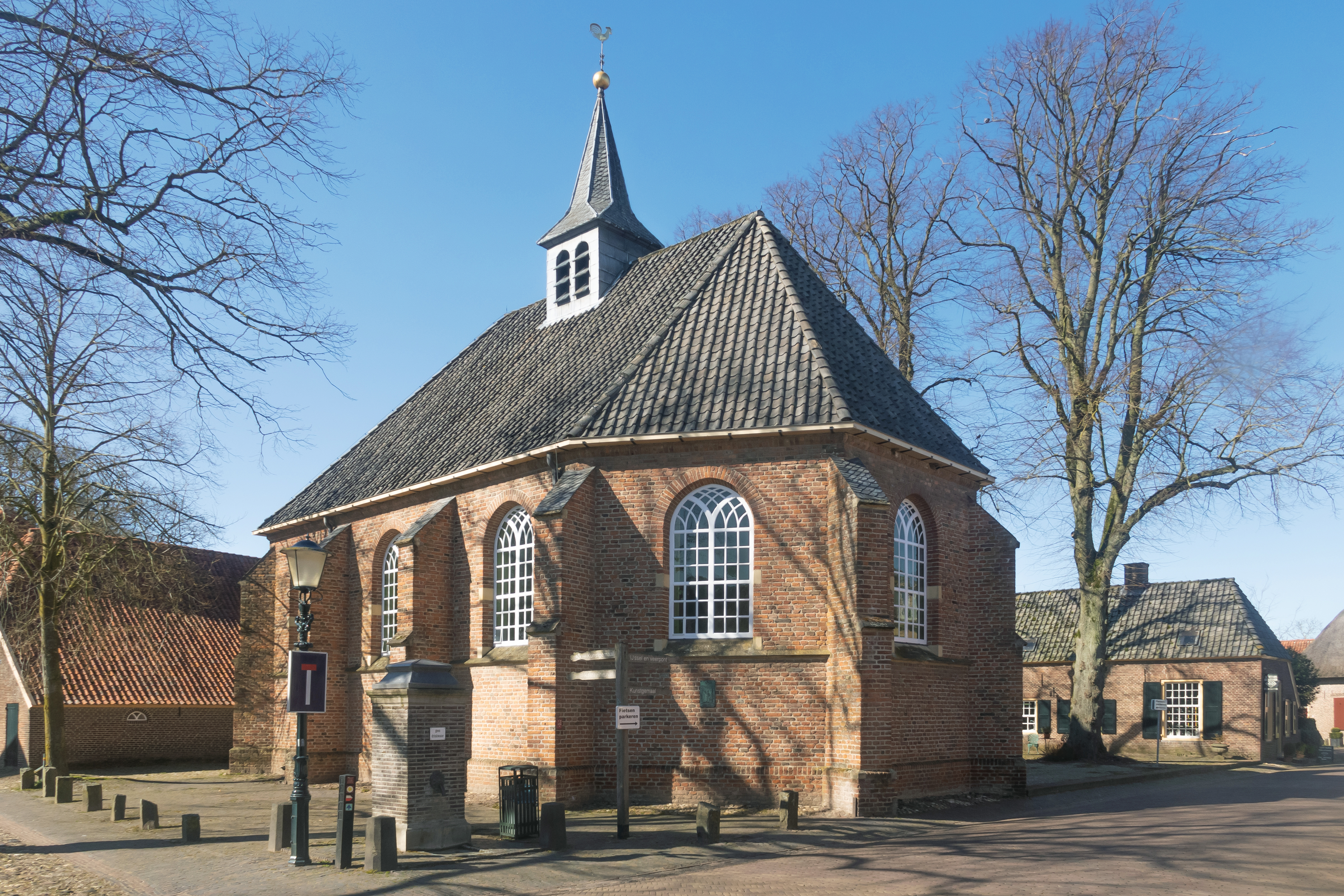
- Church in Bronkhorst

- Location in the province of Gelderland Bronkhorst (Netherlands)
- Coordinates: 52°05′N 6°11′E
- Country: Netherlands
- Province: Gelderland
- Municipality: Bronckhorst

Area
  - Total: 0.13 km^{2} (0.050 sq mi)
- Elevation: 9 m (30 ft)

Population (2022)
  - Total: 100
  - Density: 770/km^{2} (2,000/sq mi)
- Time zone: UTC+1 (CET)
  - Summer (DST): UTC+2 (CEST)
- Postal code: 7226
- Dialing code: 0575

Bronkhorst is a city in the municipality of Bronckhorst, Gelderland, the Netherlands and, with only 157 inhabitants (2010), one of the smallest cities in the Netherlands (after Staverden, Eembrugge and Sint Anna ter Muiden).

== Early history ==
The early history of Bronkhorst is, as is common for Dutch towns, largely unknown. It is possible that in the 7th century farmers settled on and around the hill on which a castle would be built later. The hill formed a refuge amidst the low-lying, fertile clay in the area, which is close to the river IJssel.

=== Lords of Bronkhorst ===
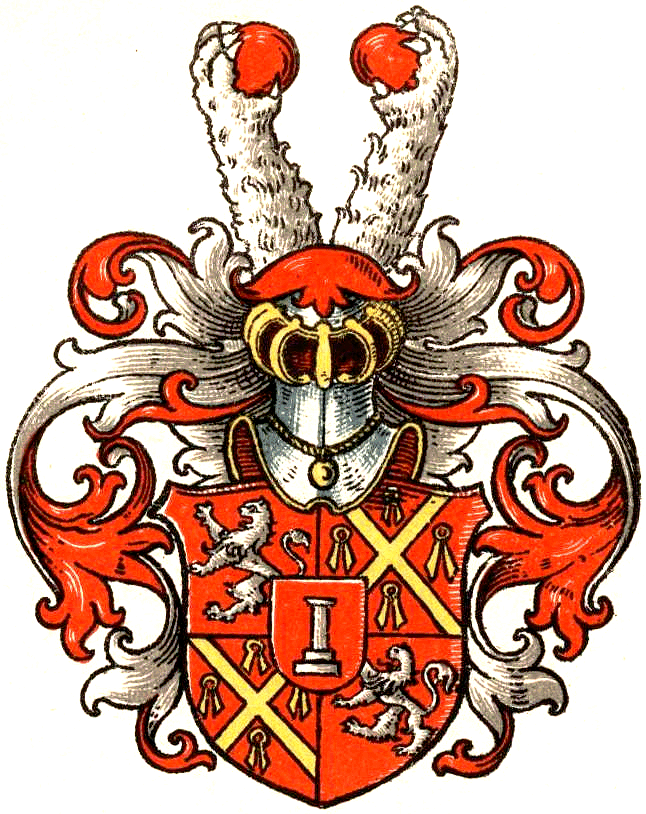
Coat of arms of Lords of Bronckhorst

Bronkhorst used to be a lordship. The earliest known lord of Bronkhorst was Gijsbert of Bronkhorst (1140), son of Adam of Bronkhorst, first mentioned in 1127. He and some of his descendants played an important role in the politics of the time. The last Bronkhorst, Joost, died in 1553, after which the domain fell to the widow of Georg of Limburg.

== Castle ==
In the Middle Ages, a castle was erected on the aforementioned hill. It is first mentioned in a 14th-century document. It consisted of a keep and associated buildings and was surrounded by a thick wall and a wide moat. It was sieged several times, most notably in 1582, when after nine months Dutch troops captured the castle, which was occupied by the Spanish during the Eighty Years' War. The castle changed hands many times, until its last owner, a merchant, had it demolished in 1828.

== Town ==
In a document dated 13 March 1482, Gijsbert VII granted city rights to the inhabitants of the village Bronkhorst, which was right next to the castle. Concretely this meant, among other things, that they were given limited self-government and were allowed to administer the law to some extent.

== Culture ==
Bronkhorst is known for its picturesque buildings, and housed a museum dedicated to Charles Dickens which also contained items purchased from the former Dickens museum at Eastgate House in Rochester, Kent.

== Gallery ==
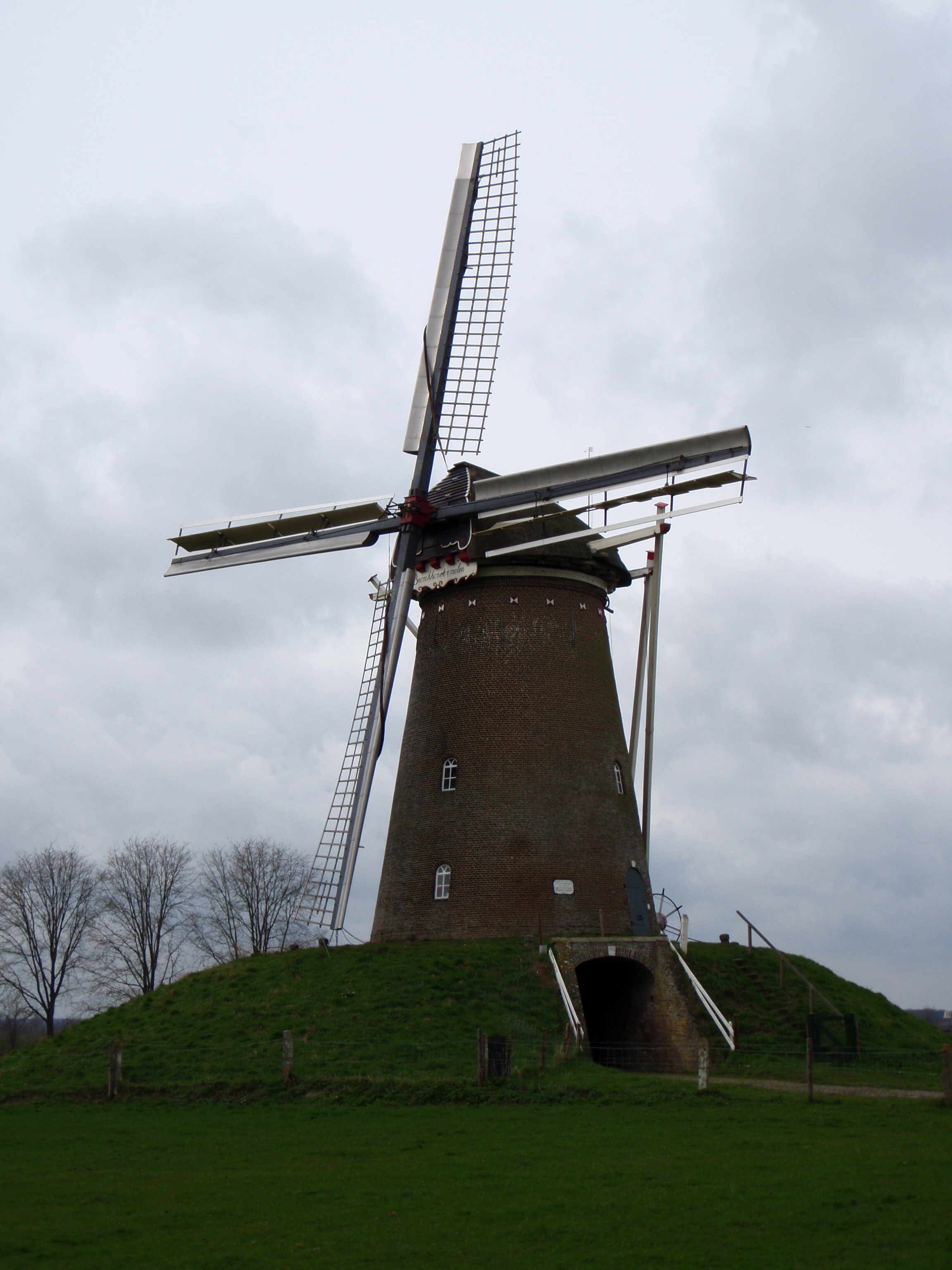
The Bronkhorst Windmill

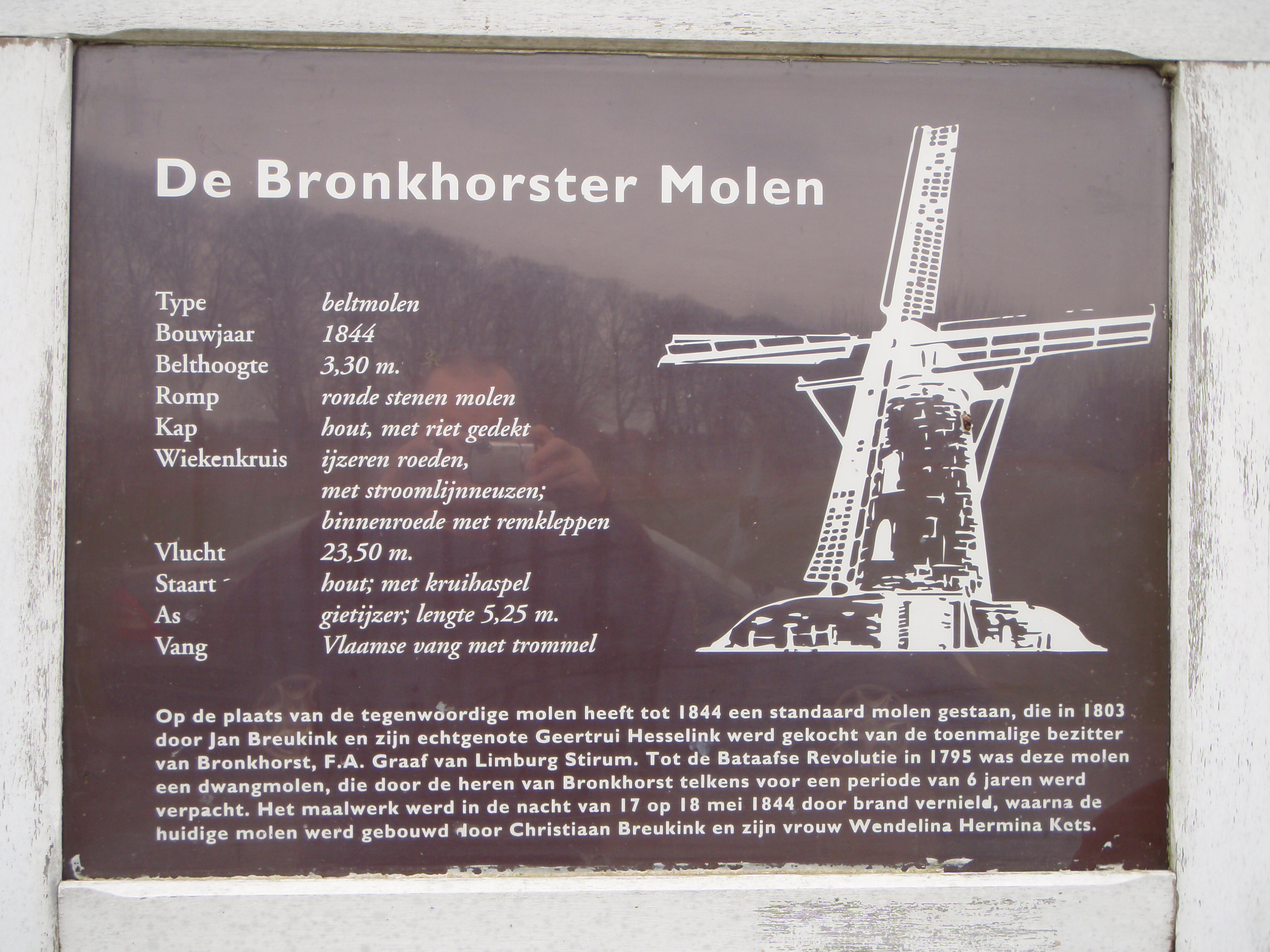
Windmill information board (in Dutch)

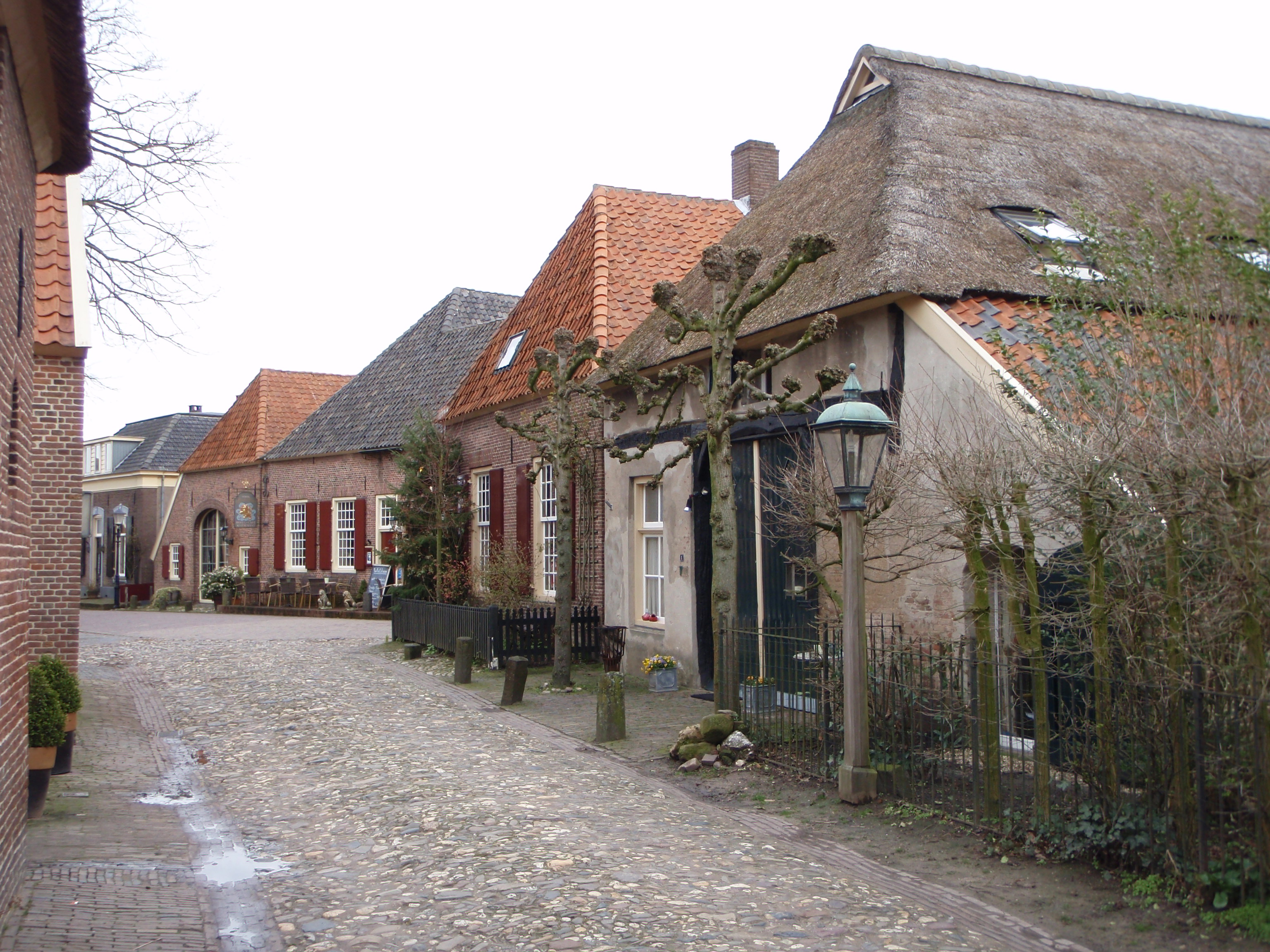

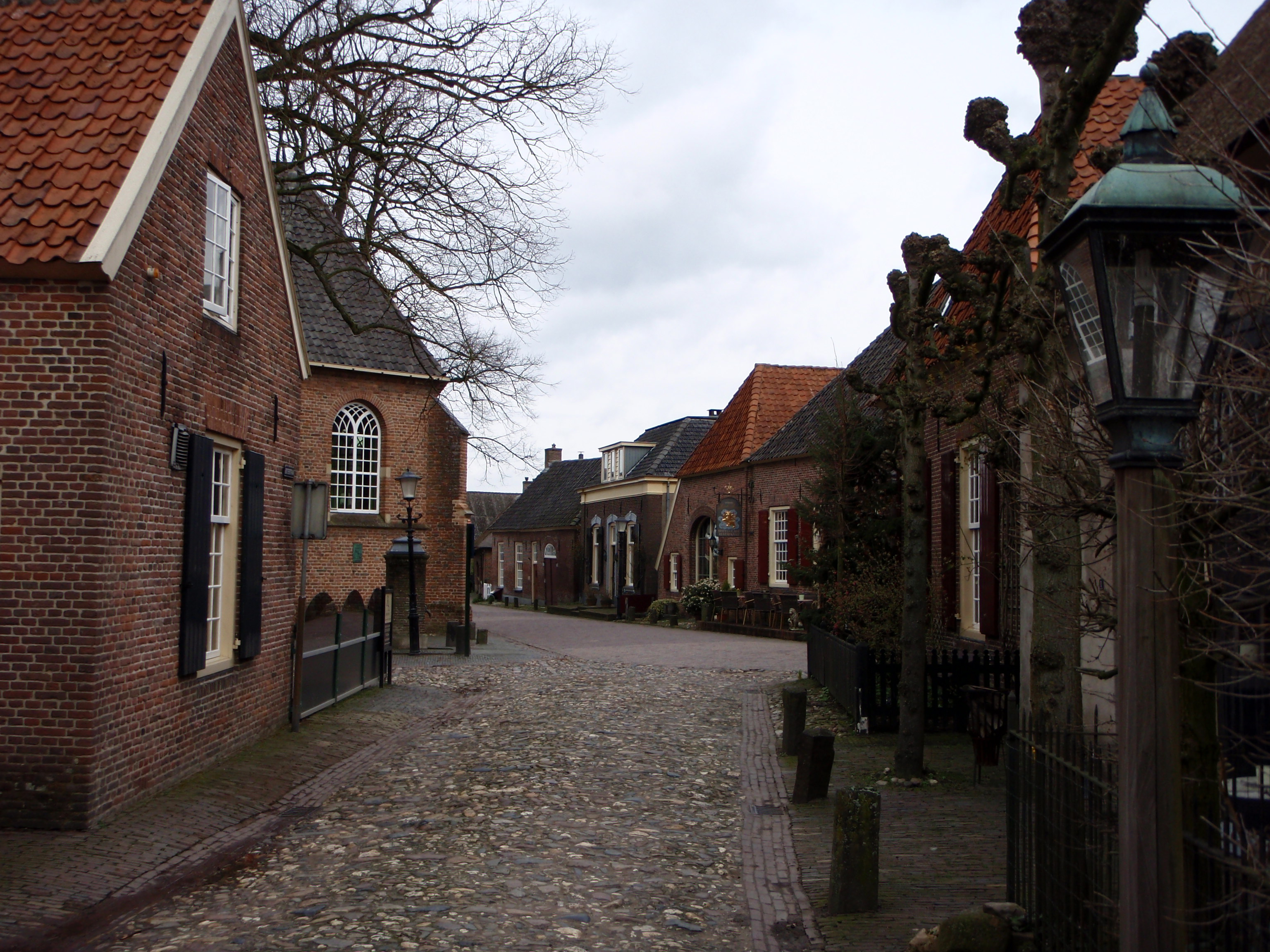

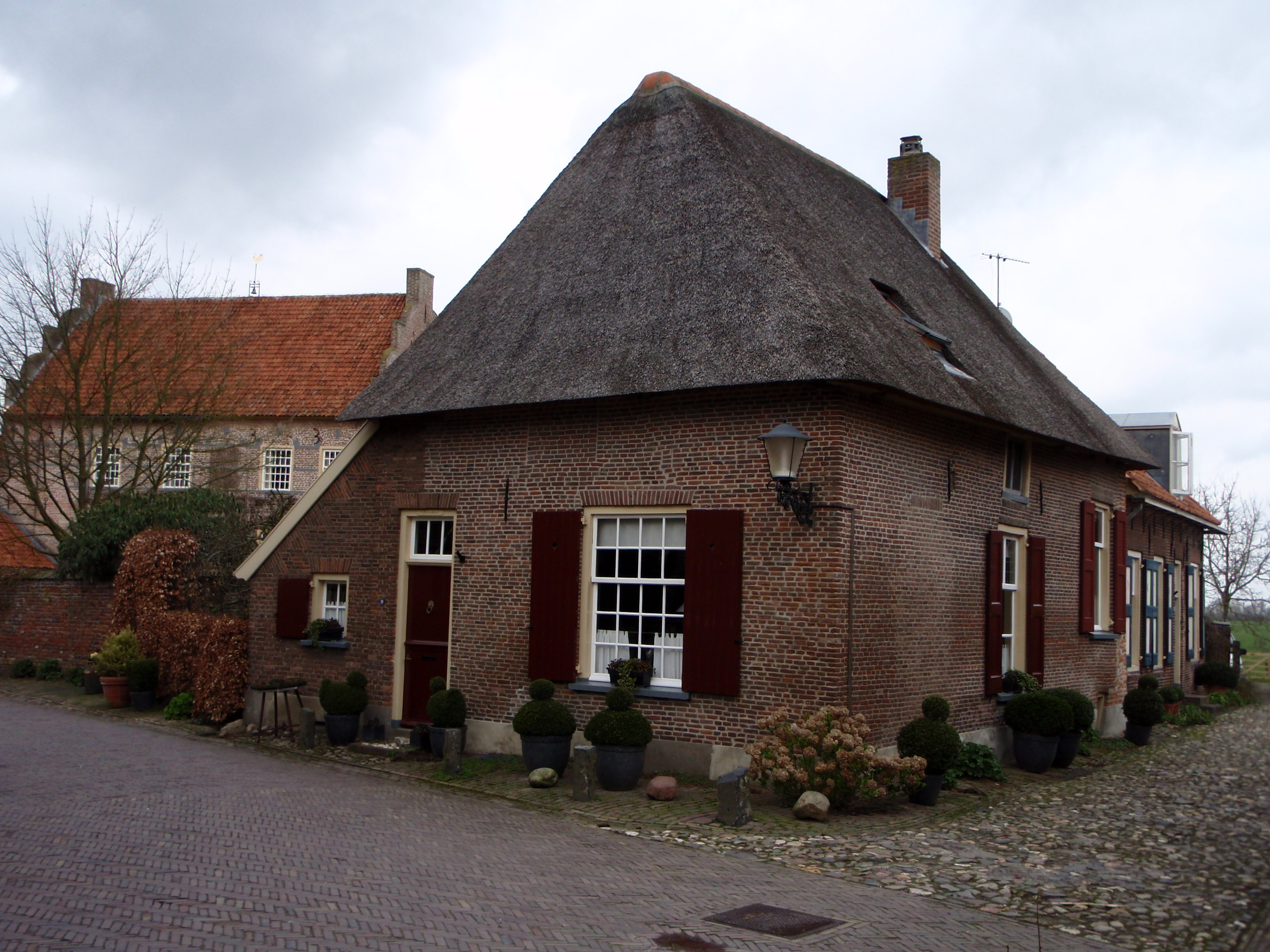

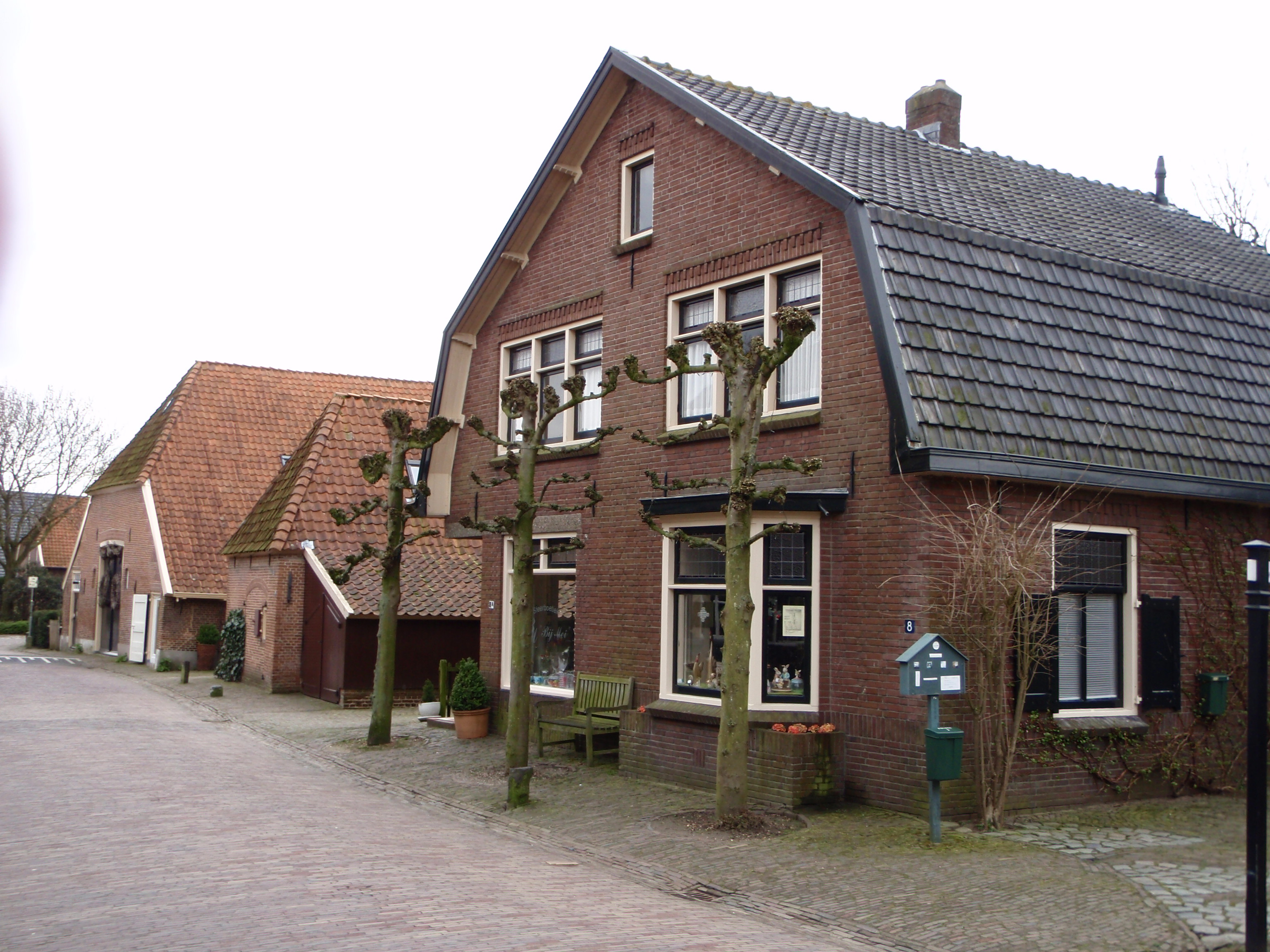
Onderstraat 8
