= Styrum =

Coordinates: 51°26′37″N 6°51′19″E

Castle Styrum before 1990

Styrum (German pronunciation: [ˈʃtiːʁʊm]; sometimes spelled "Stirum") was an immediate lordship in the Holy Roman Empire, located in Mülheim an der Ruhr, North Rhine-Westphalia, Germany. It held no seat in the Diet and was circumvened by the Lordship of Broich.

The exact date of construction of its castle is unknown. Styrum was already prosperous in Frankish times before Charlemagne (late 8th century). In 1067 Styrum was given to the Abbacy of Kaiserswerth. After the murder of the Archbishop of Cologne, Engelbert of Berg, in 1225, the descendants of Frederick I of Isenberg gained ownership of Mülheim on the river Ruhr and thereby of the castle Styrum and the castle Hohenlimburg on the river Lenne. They founded the line of Counts of Limburg zu Hohenlimburg and Lords of Limburg zu Styrum. The family obtained important estates in Westphalia and the Lower Rhine. With the partition of the House of Limburg Styrum in 1644, Styrum passed to the line of Limburg-Styrum-Styrum.

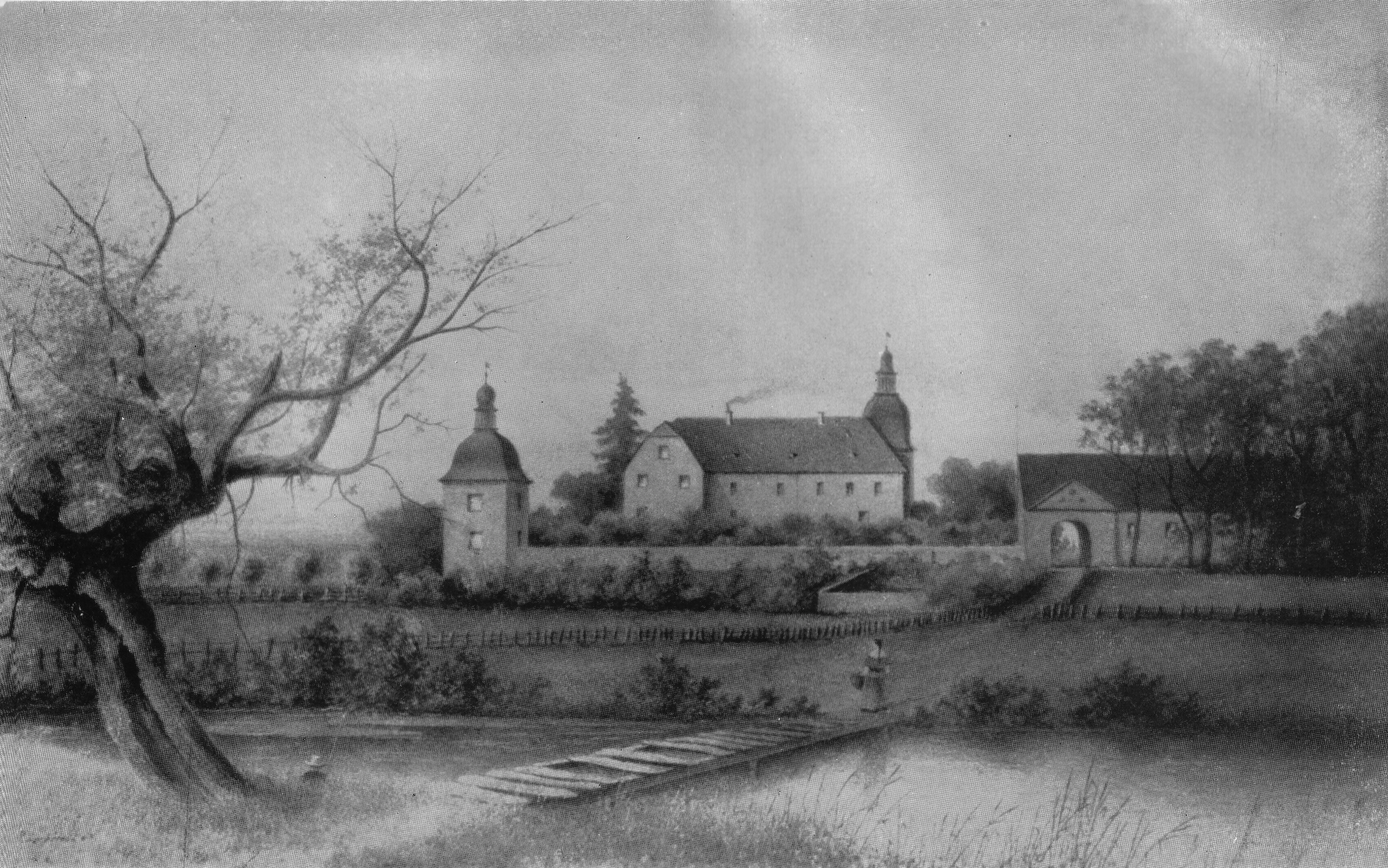
The Castle 1850

Styrum was rebuilt in Baroque style in 1668, and it received its present form after a fire in 1738. In the mediatisation of 1806, Styrum came under control of the Grand Duchy of Berg. The line of Limburg-Styrum-Styrum became extinct in 1809. The last count of the Styrum branch of the family, Ernst Maria Johan (deceased on 23 March 1809) in his will of 29 January 1808 donated Styrum to the sister of his wife: Maria Margaretha von Humbracht, who sold it in 1825.

Styrum was purchased by the German industrialist August Thyssen in 1890. His company gave the castle to the city of Mülheim in 1960. It was transformed into a restaurant, artist studio and community centre for the elderly in 1992.

The community of Styrum is now part of the cities of Mülheim an der Ruhr and Oberhausen. Its local soccer team, FC Styrum, renamed FC Mülheim in 1975, was successful from the 1950s to the 1980s, even playing in the 2. Bundesliga-Nord.

The name "Styrum" originates from "Stiarhem", meaning "Bulls Home" in the early medieval local dialect.

== Literature ==
- Rawe, Kai: Schloss Styrum (2010). In: Niederhöfer, Kai (ed.): Burgen AufRuhr. Unterwegs zu 100 Burgen, Schlössern und Herrensitzen in der Ruhrregion. Essen: Klartext Verlag, p. 301–304.
