= Levett Hanson =

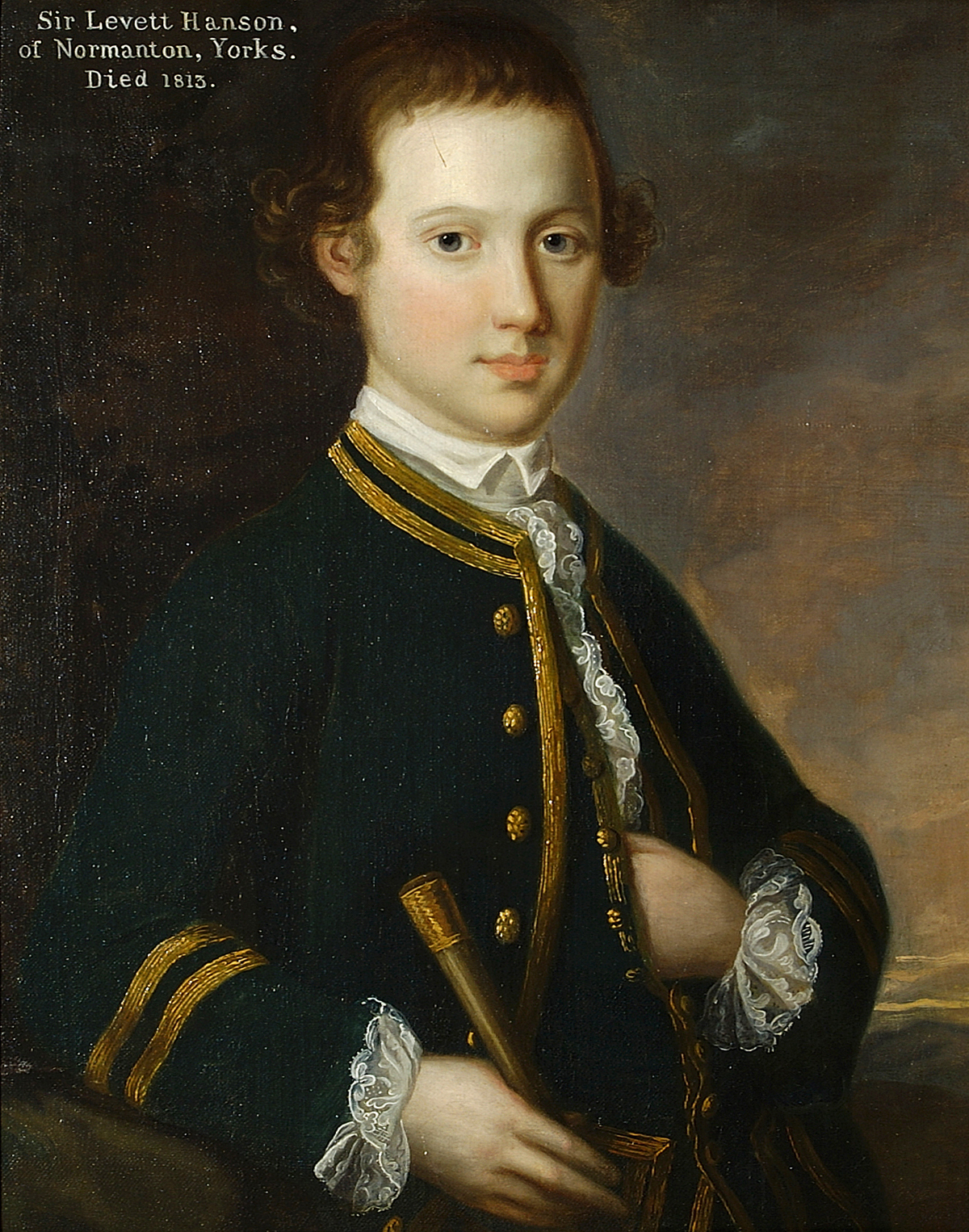
Sir Levett Hanson, of Normanton, Yorks.

Sir Levett Hanson (1754–1814), was an English-born writer and courtier who was active at a number of European courts.

== Early life ==
Hanson was born 31 December 1754, at Melton, Yorkshire. He was the only son of Robert Hanson of Normanton, Yorkshire, by his wife Elizabeth, daughter of Edward Isaack Jackson of Bury St Edmunds. His father was the son of Benjamin Hanson and Elizabeth, daughter of Robert Levett of Normanton. Hanson went to a school at Bury St. Edmunds in 1766, and afterwards, in 1769, to one at North Walsham, Norfolk, where Nelson was his schoolfellow for two years. He was on terms of friendship with Nelson throughout his life. In 1771, he studied with Dr. Zouch, prebend of Durham, at Wycliffe, and in October 1773 went to Trinity College, Cambridge. Owing to a brawl, he soon migrated to Emmanuel as a fellow-commoner, but did not take a degree. In the autumn of 1776, he made, in company with Dr. Michael Lort, his first tour on the Continent and acquired a taste for foreign life and society, which led him to live outside of England.

== Career ==
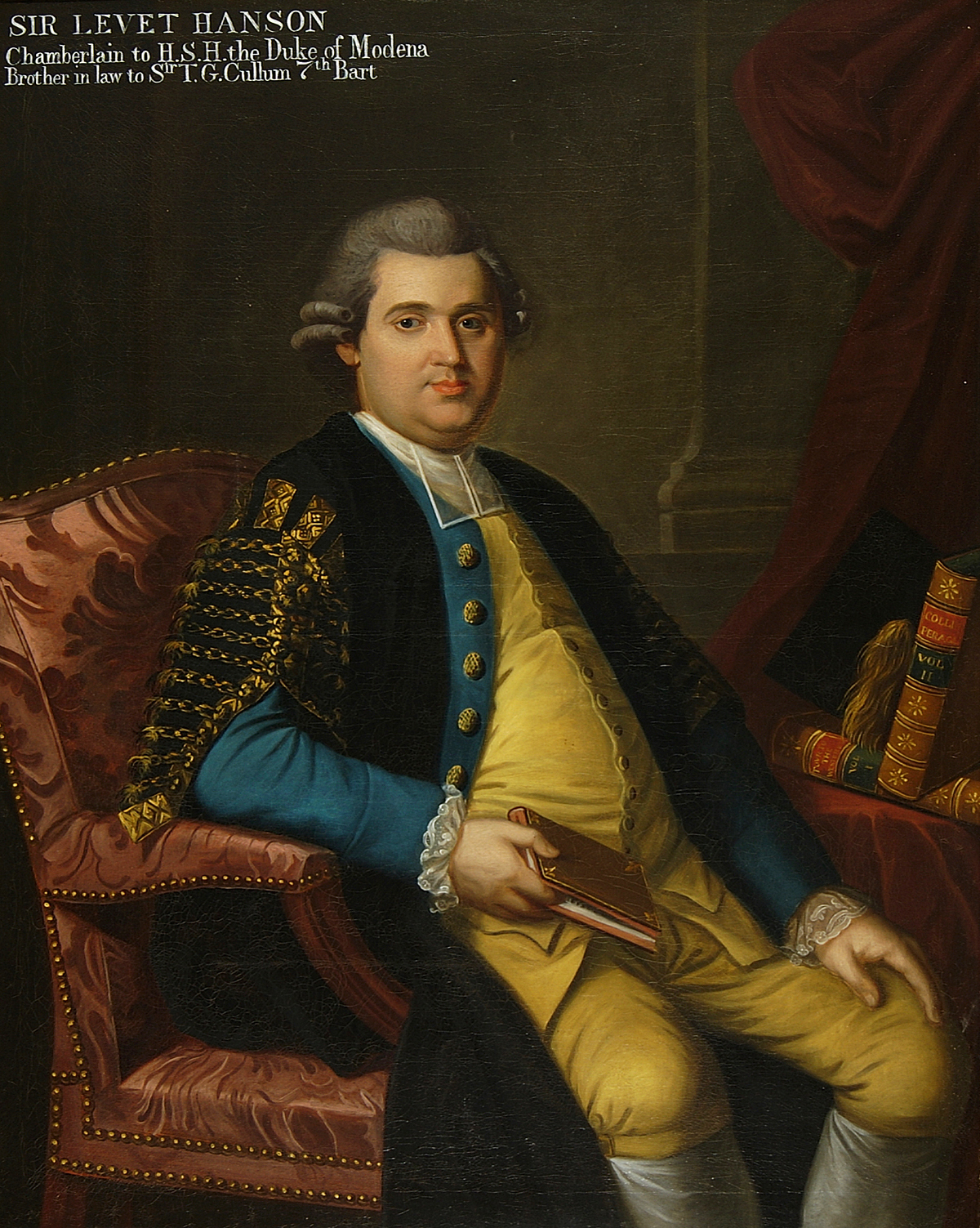
Sir Levett Hanson, Chamberlain to H.S.H. the Duke of Modena, Brother in law to Sir T. G. Cullum, 7th Bart., by Joseph Samuel Webster

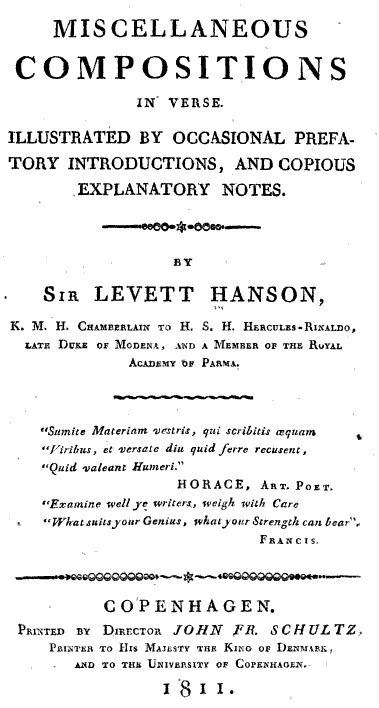
"Miscellaneous Compositions in Verse" by Sir Levett Hanson, Copenhagen, 1811, dedicated to Warren Hastings

Between 1776 and his death, he paid only four brief visits to England (in 1780, 1785, 1786, and 1790). After long sojourns at many foreign courts, Hanson made the acquaintance, in 1780, of Prince Philip of Limbourg, Duke of Holstein, who made him his councillor and knight of his Order of St Philip. Later on, Hanson was made vice-chancellor and knight grand cross of the order, and resided for several years at Ghent. In 1787, he spent some time at the court of Ferdinand, Duke of Parma. In 1789, he visited Naples and saw the Hamiltons, and in 1791, he took up his residence at the court of Ercole III d'Este, Duke of Modena, with the rank of Brigadier-General and Chamberlain. He had previously become a member of the Royal Academy of Parma. In 1794, he incurred the suspicion of the Austrian government and was compelled to leave the court of Modena, though he retained his office and the friendship of Ercole III until the latter's death in 1803.

On arriving at Innsbruck, he was arrested, kept eleven months in confinement, and finally tried at Vienna. On his release, he travelled in Germany, finding favour at various courts, notably at Saxe-Hildburghausen, where he was presented with the family order of the Duke, and settled in 1797 at Erlangen. In 1800, he was made Knight Vice-Chancellor of the Order of Saint Joachim, an order he was afterwards instrumental in conferring on Nelson. He now devoted himself to the compilation of An Accurate Historical Account of all the Orders of Knighthood at Present Existing in Europe, which was printed at Hamburg and published in London in 1803, with a dedication to Nelson.

In 1807, he moved to Stockholm, where he was presented to Gustavus IV by the British minister. An entertaining account of Hanson's appearance at this ceremony is given in Brown's Memoirs of Northern Courts. In 1811, Hanson moved for the last time to Copenhagen, where in the same year he published Miscellaneous Compositions in Verse, dedicated to his friend Warren Hastings.

== Death ==
Hanson died at Copenhagen on 22 April 1814. He was unmarried and his property passed to his only sister, Mary, wife of Sir Thomas Gery Cullum, 7th baronet, of Hardwick House, Bury St. Edmunds. Hanson's correspondence, containing amusing and interesting details of the various courts which he visited, together with three portraits (one a miniature by N. Hone), are preserved at Hardwick House, now in the possession of G. Milner Gibson-Cullum, F.S.A.

== Honours ==
- Limburg-Stirum: Knight Grand Cross of the Order of Saint Philip (1780)
- Knight Vice-Chancellor of the Order of Saint Joachim (1800)
