= Four Emperors =

Four Emperors may refer to:

- The Order of the Four Emperors
- The Roman Emperors Galba, Otho, Vitellius, and Vespasian, who successively came to power in AD 68 and 69, the Year of the Four Emperors
- The Shiseiten, from the manga Samurai Deeper Kyo
- The Yonkou (literally Four Emperors), four pirates in the anime/manga series One Piece
