= Order of Saint George (House of Habsburg) =

- St George's Cross
- Active: 1469 – 1598
- Allegiance: Frederick III, Holy Roman Emperor (1469–1493); Maximilian I, Holy Roman Emperor (1493–1519)
- Type: Catholic religious order (military order)
- Headquarters: Millstatt Abbey; Wiener Neustadt
- Patron: Saint George
- Attire: White mantle with a red cross

Commanders
- First Grand Master: Johann Siebenhirter (1469–1508)
- Second Grand Master: Johann Geumann (1508–1536)
- Third Grand Master: Wolfgang Prandtner (1536–1541)

The Order of Saint George (Latin: Ordo militaris Sancti Georgii; German: St. Georgs-Orden) is an Austrian chivalric order founded by the Habsburg emperor Frederick III and Pope Paul II in 1469. Established as a military order to advocate the Christian faith, its original implicit goal was to combat the Ottoman incursions into the Inner Austrian lands of Styria, Carinthia and Carniola. The order resided at Millstatt Abbey and in Wiener Neustadt, until in 1598 its properties were handed over to the Jesuit college in Graz.

== History ==
=== Frederick III ===
In 1462 Emperor Frederick III and his court were besieged within the Hofburg by his brother, Archduke Albert VI of Austria, and a rebel army of insurgent citizens. While barricaded within the palace, Frederick made a vow that if he were to overcome the siege, he would undertake a pilgrimage to Rome, find a diocese, and establish a chivalric order in honour of Saint George. In 1463 Albert suddenly died, leaving Frederick III's rule uncontested and breaking the siege.

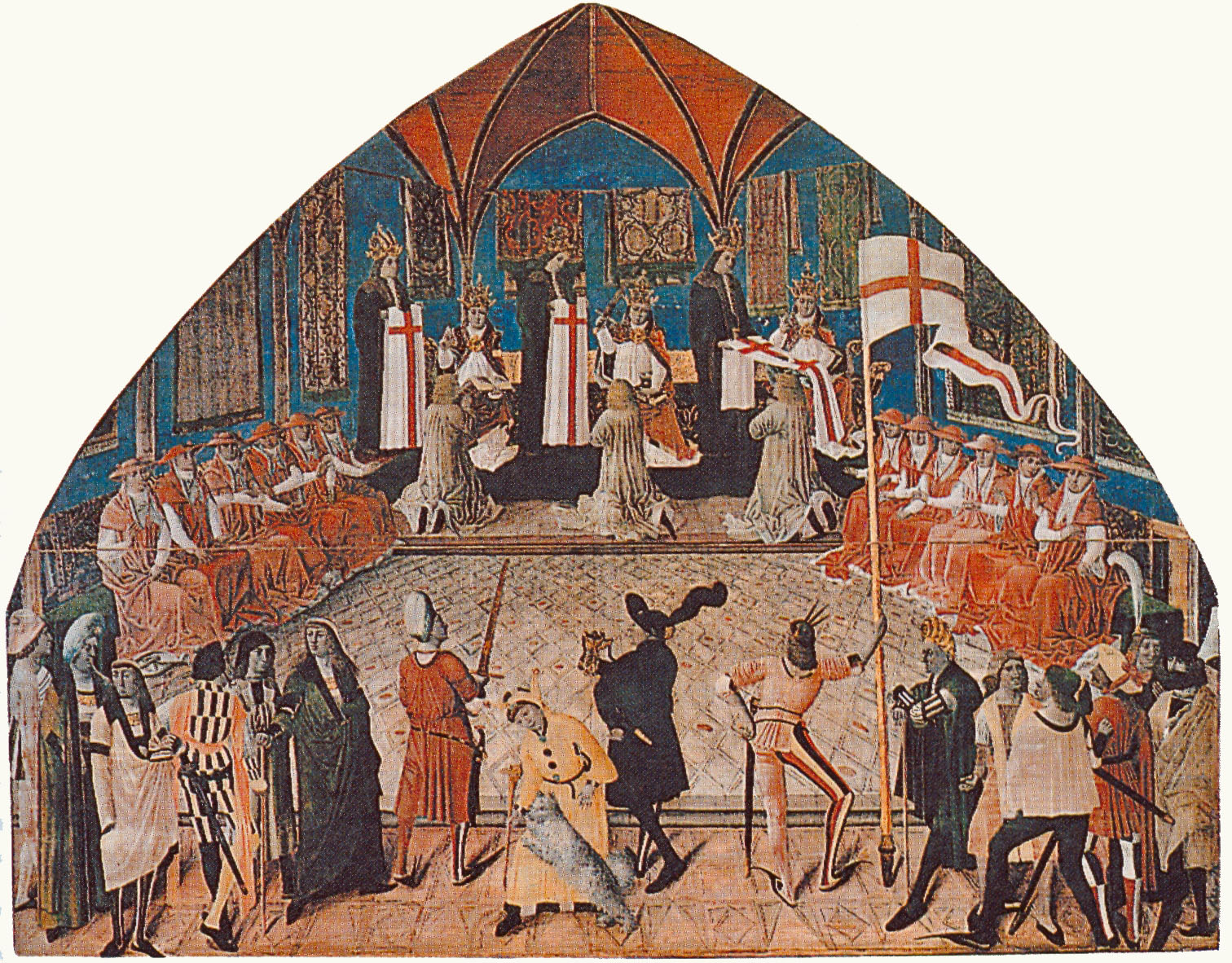
Investiture of the first Grand Master of the Knights of St George by Pope Paul II

In November 1468, Frederick proceeded to the Holy See, where on 1 January 1469 the first Grand Master, Johann Siebenhirter, received his investiture in the Lateran Basilica. On 18 January the Austrian Diocese of Vienna and the Diocese of Wiener Neustadt were established by papal bull. The Wiener Neustadt bishopric was incorporated into the Order of Saint George in 1479; however, this union was overshadowed by ongoing quarrels between the Grand Master and Bishop, mainly over the order of precedence, and the union was again dissolved in 1528.

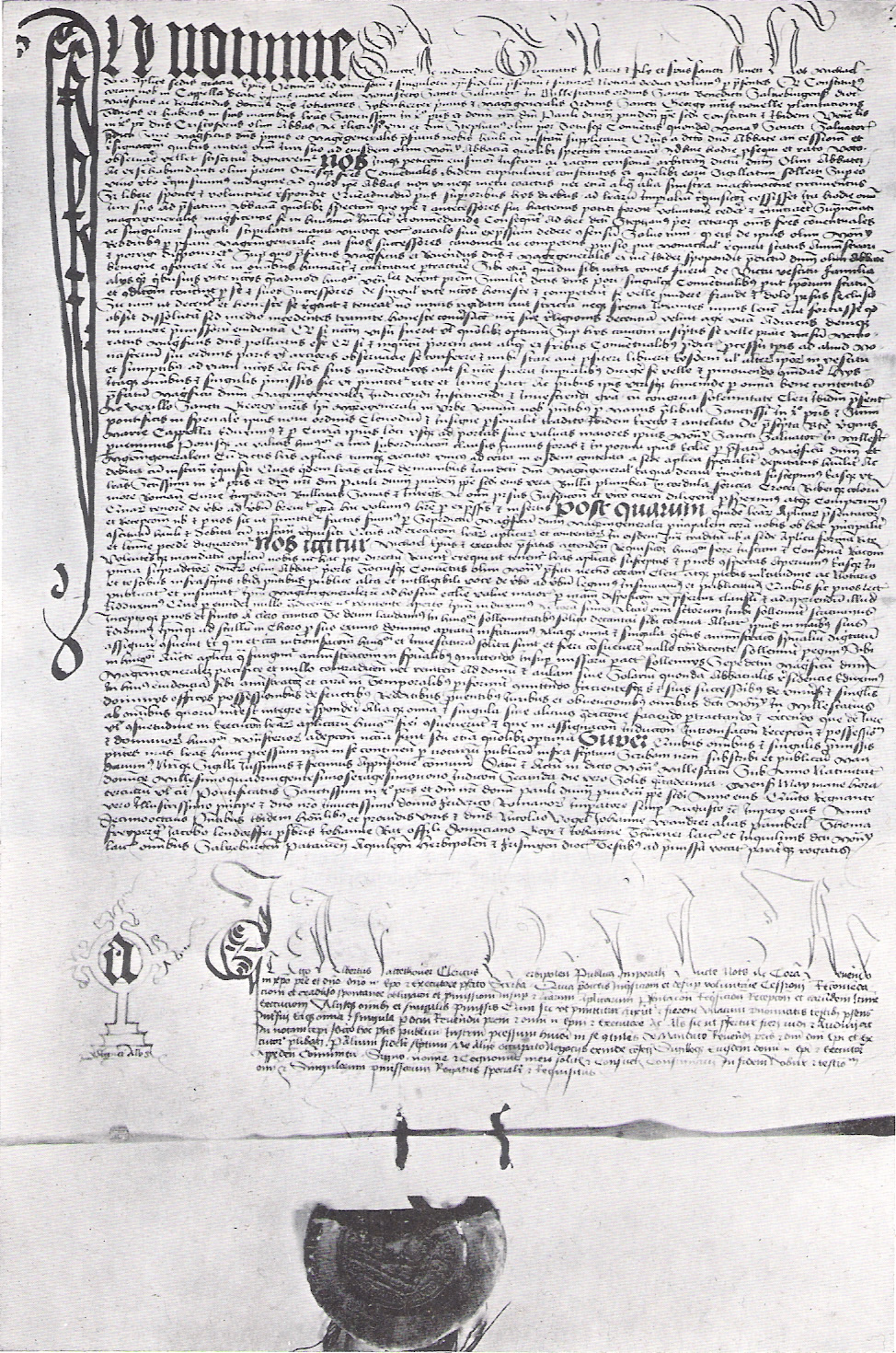
Certificate of the papal legate Michael Padena on the inauguration of Grand Master Johann Siebenhirter, 14 May 1469

On 14 May 1469 Grand Master Siebenhirter ceremoniously entered Millstatt, where the Order was vested with the estates of the former Benedictine abbey. Emperor Frederick III himself acted as the monastery's Vogt protector, but found its premises decayed and monastic life at a low point. His request to dissolve the convent was approved by Pope Paul II. The Order received further Carinthian estates at the strategically important Seeberg Saddle (Rechberg) and the Maria Wörth Provostry, as well as the Styrian lordships of Pürgg in the Enns valley and Sankt Lorenzen im Mürztal. It temporarily held the former Sternberg comital estates, Landskron Castle (from 1511), the Bozen parish in Tyrol and additional possessions in Vienna and Lower Austria. When in 1479 the Order established its headquarters at Burg Wiener Neustadt, the patron of the Cathedral became Saint George. The proposed acquisition of Viktring Abbey, however, met fierce resistance from the Archbishop of Salzburg.

Siebenhirter made significant efforts to restore the Millstatt monastery complex as a presentable residence, and had extensive fortifications erected. He left valuable incunables such as a prayer book, today kept at the National Library of Sweden, and an antiphonary, which is part of the collections of the University Library of Graz. The Grand Master also provided for the decoration of numerous parish churches with Late Gothic winged altarpieces and frescoes.

=== Maximilian I ===
As the few Knights of Saint George proved unfit to fight the invading Ottoman forces, Emperor Frederick's son and successor Maximilian I (archduke 1493–1519, emperor 1508–19), called "the Last Knight", shortly after his father's death in 1493 established an affiliated secular Saint George fraternity, mainly to man a planned fortress at Rann (Brežice) in Lower Styria. Emperor Maximilian himself and several Princes of the Holy Roman Empire joined the brotherhood in a solemn ceremony held at Antwerp Cathedral on 28 October 1494. Pope Alexander VI and numerous cardinals also were members. Maximilian called for a Christian campaign against the Ottoman intruders, which however failed due to the Habsburg quarrels with King Charles VIII of France and the Republic of Venice.

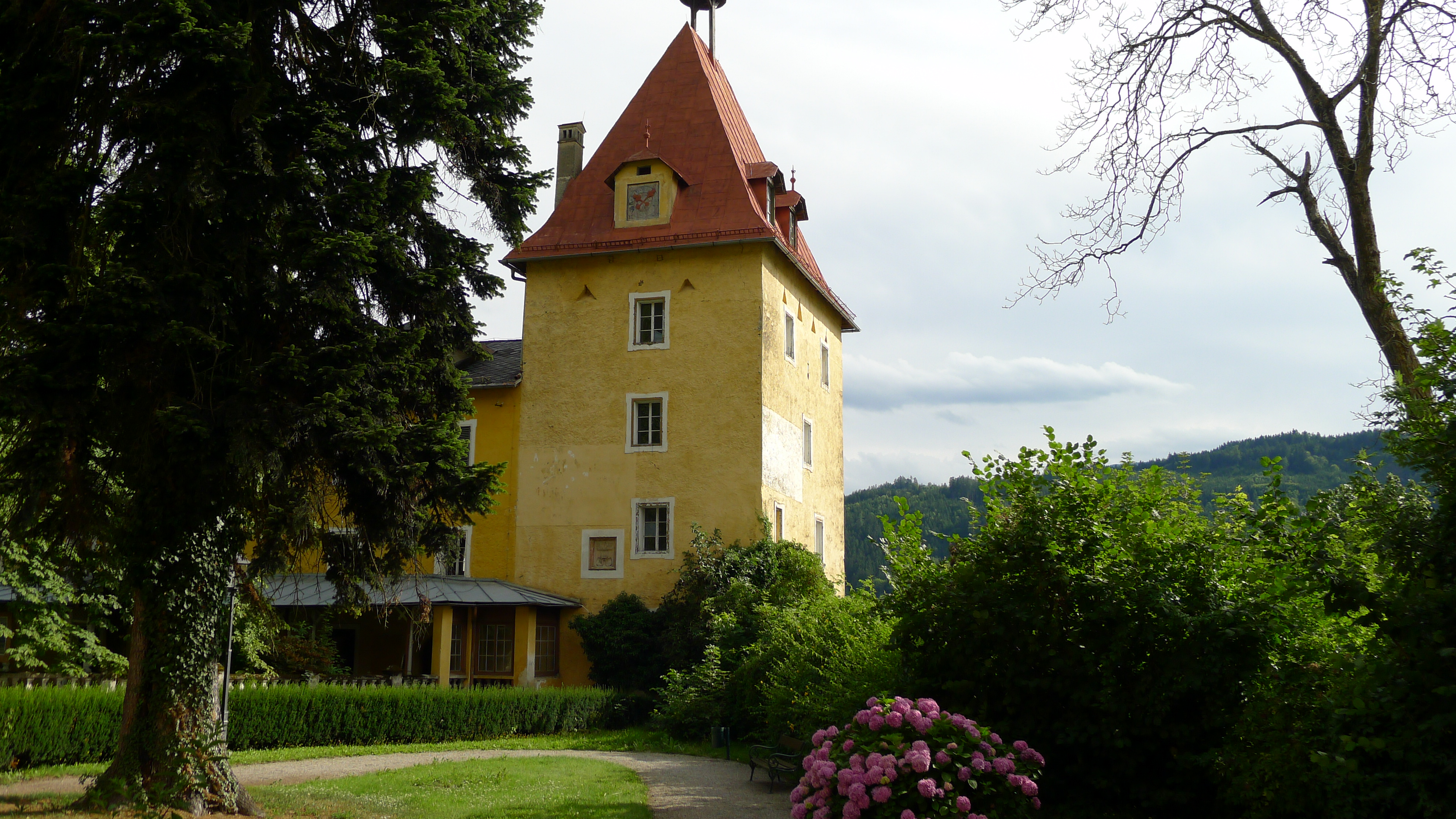
Siebenhirter Tower, Millstatt Abbey

Nevertheless, Maximilian remained an eager patron of the Order, whose representatives were present when in 1508 he took the title of an "Elected Roman Emperor" during a ceremony held at Trient Cathedral. On 10 October 1508 Grand Master Siebenhirter died and was succeeded by the Upper Austrian noble Johann Geumann. Maximilian thought about assuming the title of Grand Master himself, as he had had do cede the rights of Sovereign of the Order of the Golden Fleece to his son Philip I of Castile in 1482, and Geumann did not receive his investiture until Maximilan's death on 1518. The next year, he acted as the late emperor's executioner of will and designated tomb guard at Wiener Neustadt Cathedral, after the Salzburg archbishop Leonhard von Keutschach had thwarted Maximilian's plans for a grail's fortress near St. Wolfgang. Numerous artworks from the estate of the emperor referred to the Order of Saint George, such as the Triumphal Arch, the Theuerdank and Weißkunig publications, as well as his prayer book printed in 1513 with drawings by Albrecht Dürer (kept at the Bavarian State Library).

=== Decline after Maximilian ===
With Maximilian, the Order lost his most influential patron. Emperors Charles V and his brother, Ferdinand I, had no interest in maintaining an obsolete knightly community not sufficient to meet modern military demands. Moreover, the Protestant Reformation spread over the Inner Austrian lands and was joined by many of the Order's members. After Johan Geumann died in 1536, a third Grand Master, Wolfgang Prandtner, was appointed, who nevertheless was absent most of the time and succumbed to the plague five years later. Afterwards no further Grand Master was appointed and the Order's premises were administrated by Imperial commissioners. When the Jesuit college in the Inner Austrian capital Graz was established by Archduke Charles II, the earnings of the order estates were added to its endowment. In 1598, the estates were formally handed over to the Jesuits; however, a formal dissolution of the Order is not documented.

== Further development ==
A 17th century re-establishment of a knightly brotherhood (Italian: Imperiale Ordine Militare Capitolare Di S. Giorgio In Carinzia) at the Augustinian Church in Vienna is mentioned in a 1974 guide to Austrian chivalric orders; the priory is said to be confirmed by Emperor Francis Joseph I of Austria in 1848 and his successor Charles I in 1917. Upon the dissolution of the Austro-Hungarian Empire, Prior Alois Hudal in a memorandum turned to Charles I for the approbation of a secular chivalric order.

The order's history was partly adopted by the secular Old Chivalric Order of Saint George, also called the Order of the Four Emperors, which was re-established in 1768 by count Philipp Ferdinand of Limburg-Stirum.

Since 2011, a European Order of Saint George exists as a dynastic order of the House of Habsburg-Lorraine, whose current head is Karl von Habsburg.

== The false Carinthian order ==
In Slovenia since 2013 an Order of the Knights of Saint George of Carinthia exists, which claims to be the rightful successor to the medieval order although it is not recognized by the Vatican. It also claims the head of the House of Habsburg-Lothringen as their leader although the latter is the grand master of only one order that is present in Slovenia, The European Order of Saint George.
