= Joseph Samuel Webster =

English painter

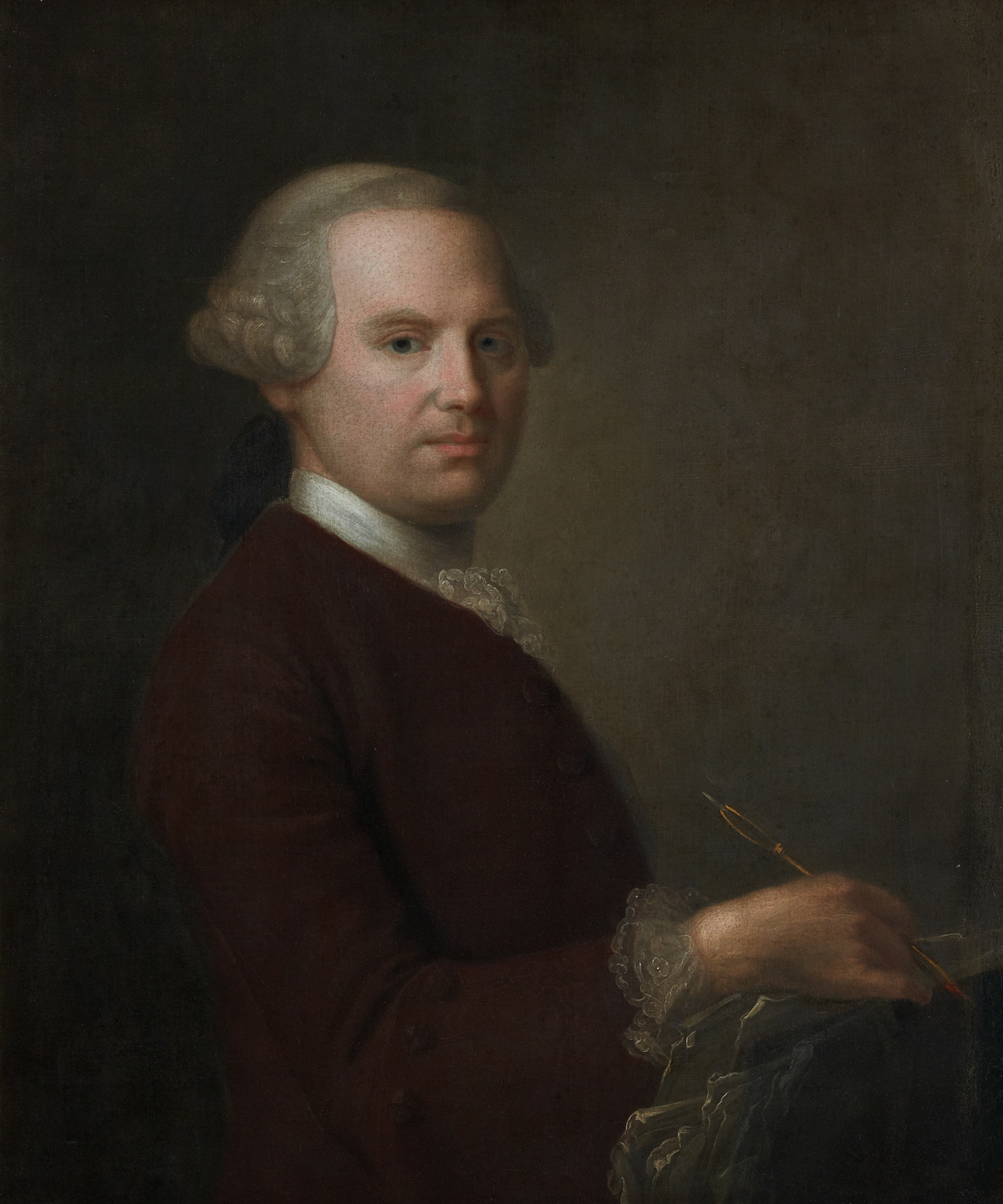
Webster's portrait of Robert Strange, c. 1750

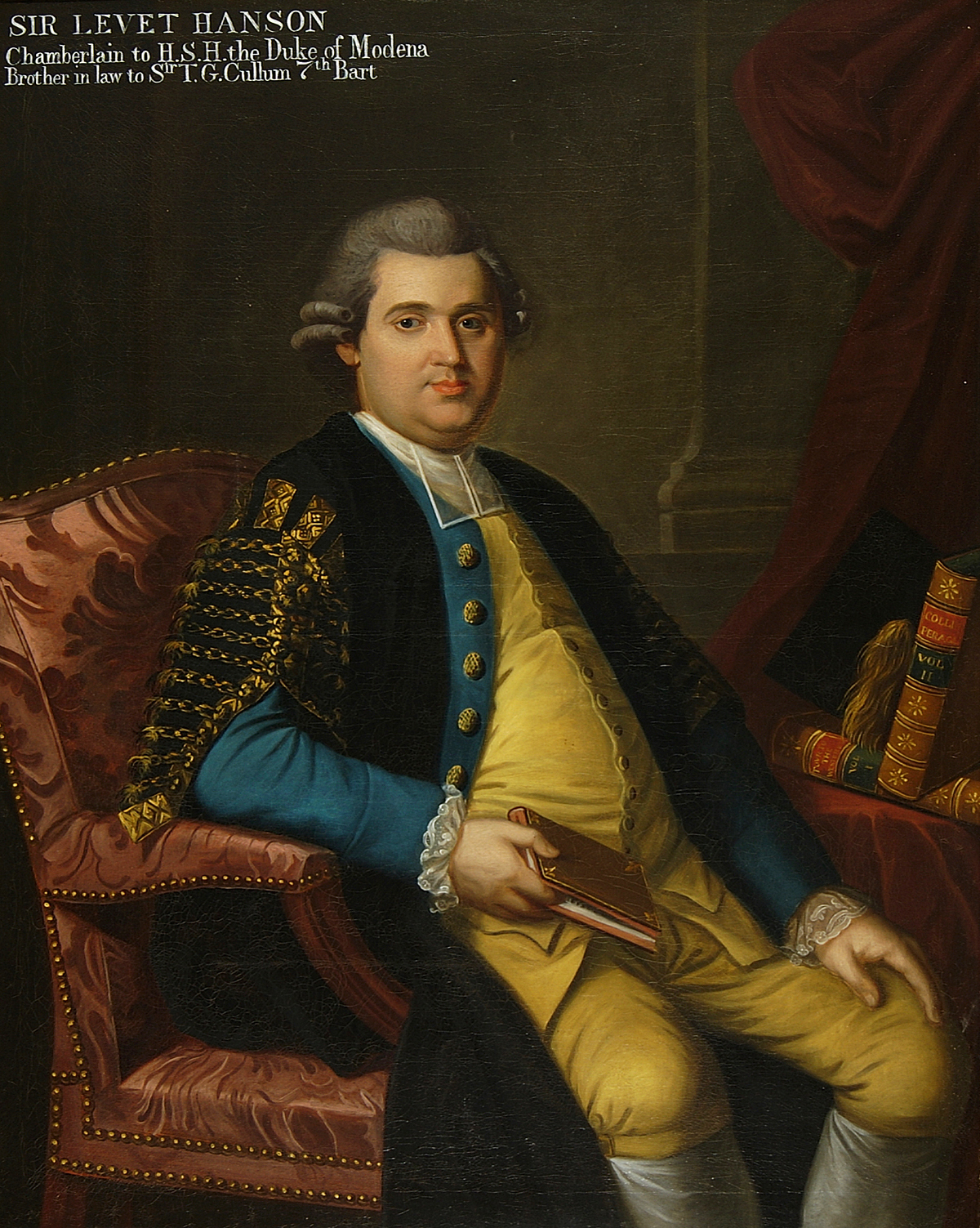
Portrait of Levett Hanson by Webster, c. 1790

Joseph Samuel Webster (died 6 July 1796) was an English portrait painter who worked in miniatures, oils, pastels, and crayons.

Little is known of Webster's life. His portrait of Robert Strange has been reported to date from 1750, while one of John Ward (died 1758) is estimated to date from about 1755. Between 1762 and 1780, while living in Covent Garden, he was exhibiting miniatures and crayons at the Society of Artists of Great Britain, and in 1763 his work also appeared in the Free Society. In 1769 the Society of Artists paid him for some of his work which had been destroyed in a fire. He was still working about 1790, the estimated date of his portrait of Sir Levett Hanson. He died in 1796.

Georg Kaspar Nagler notes that Webster painted in the manner of Joshua Reynolds, that he painted ideal figures as well as portraits, and that some of his work was engraved, including a painting of Thomas Herring, Archbishop of Canterbury.

Webster has been confused with the "Mr. Joseph Webster, jun., of Loughborough", born 1774, whose death was announced in The Gentleman's Magazine for August 1796. The issue for September marked the death of this Webster by printing an engraving of him by James Basire.

== Notes ==
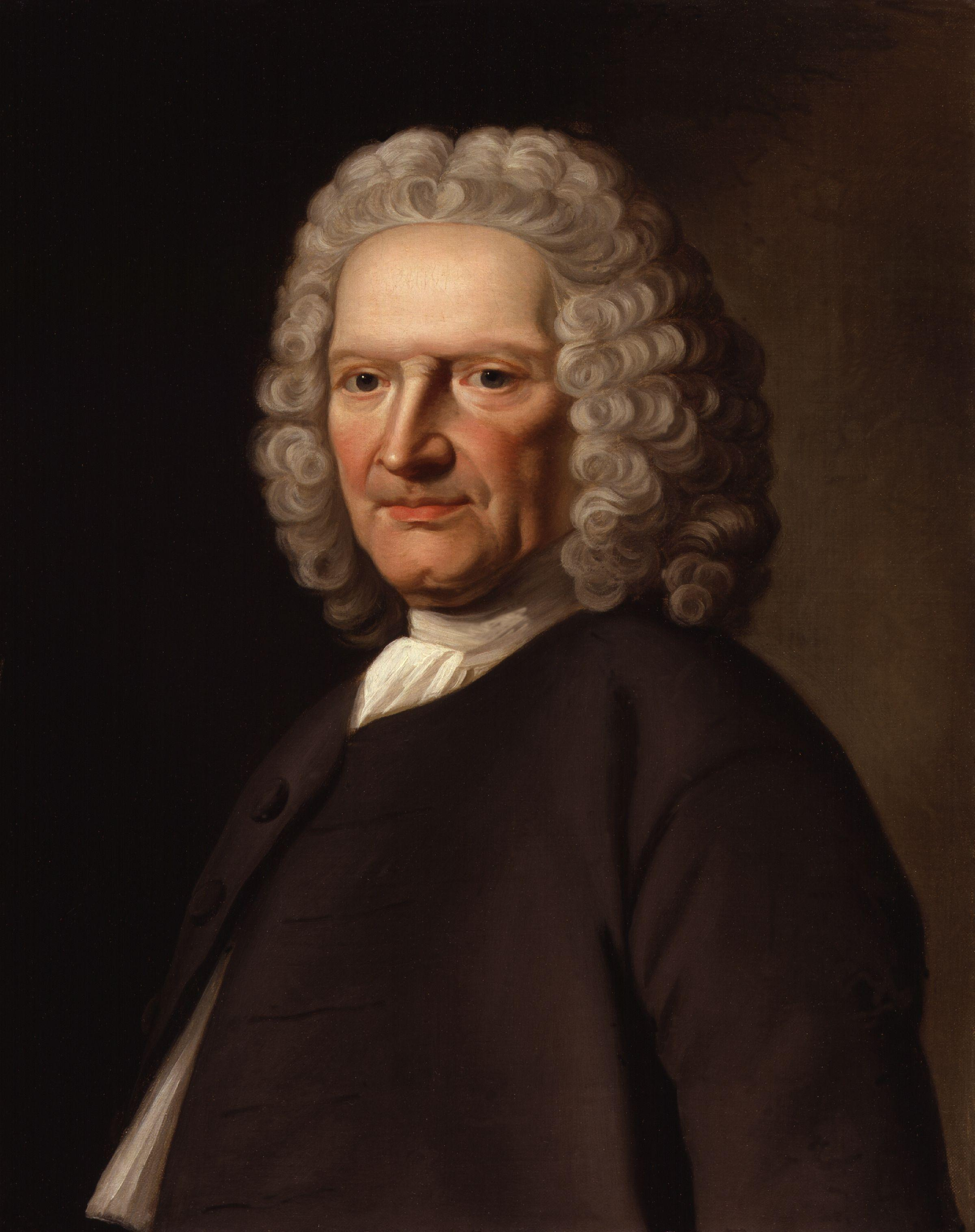
John Ward, by Webster, c. 1755
