= Robert Strange (engraver) =

Scottish engraver

Sir Robert Strange (14 July 1721 – 5 July 1792) was a Scottish engraver. A Jacobite, he spent periods out of Great Britain, but was eventually reconciled to the Hanoverian succession and was knighted by George III.

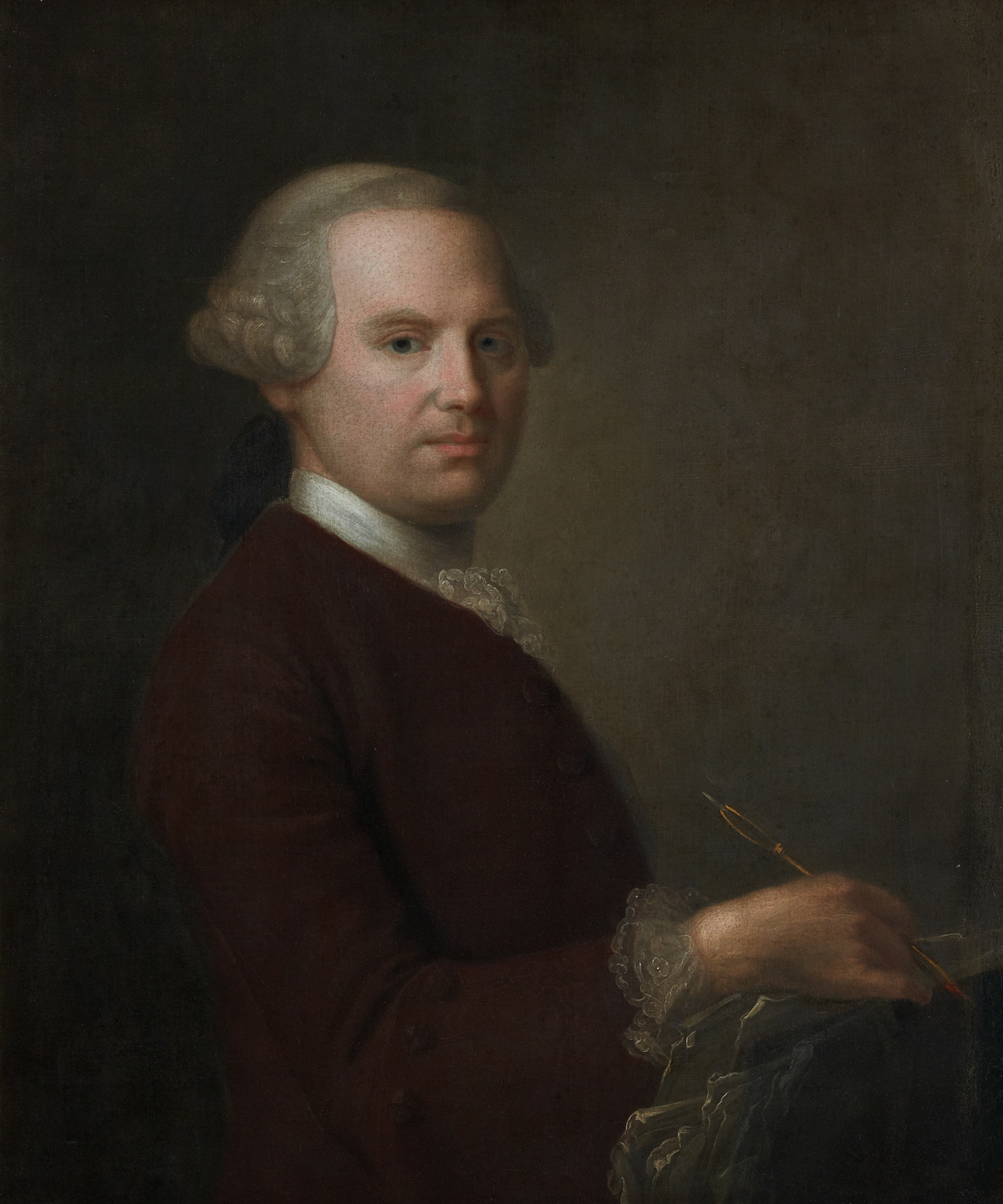
Robert Strange, 1750 portrait by Joseph Samuel Webster

== Early life ==
The eldest son of David Strang of Kirkwall in Orkney, by his second wife Jean, daughter of Malcolm Scollay of Hunton, he was born at Kirkwall on 14 July 1721. He entered the office of a brother, a lawyer in Edinburgh. He then was apprenticed to Richard Cooper, the elder, an engraver, for six years.

Strange fought in the rising of 1745. While with the army at Inverness, he engraved a plate for the bank-notes of the planned Stuart government. The plate was lost but subsequently found in a peat bog and purchased for The West Highland Museum by D.Y. Cameron, a skilled etcher, who printed some notes from it.

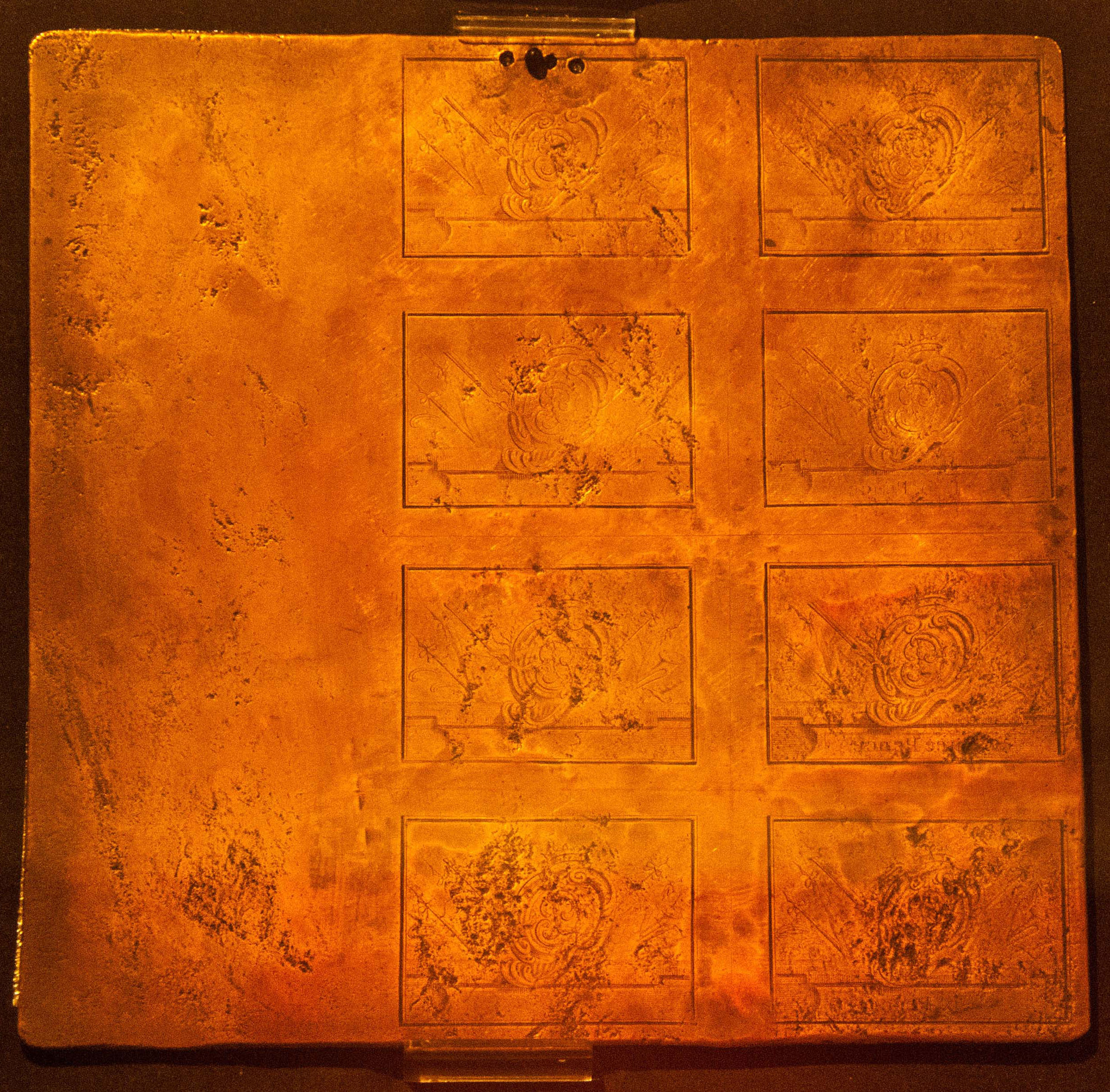
Robert Strange's copper plate for printing banks notes for the Jacobites

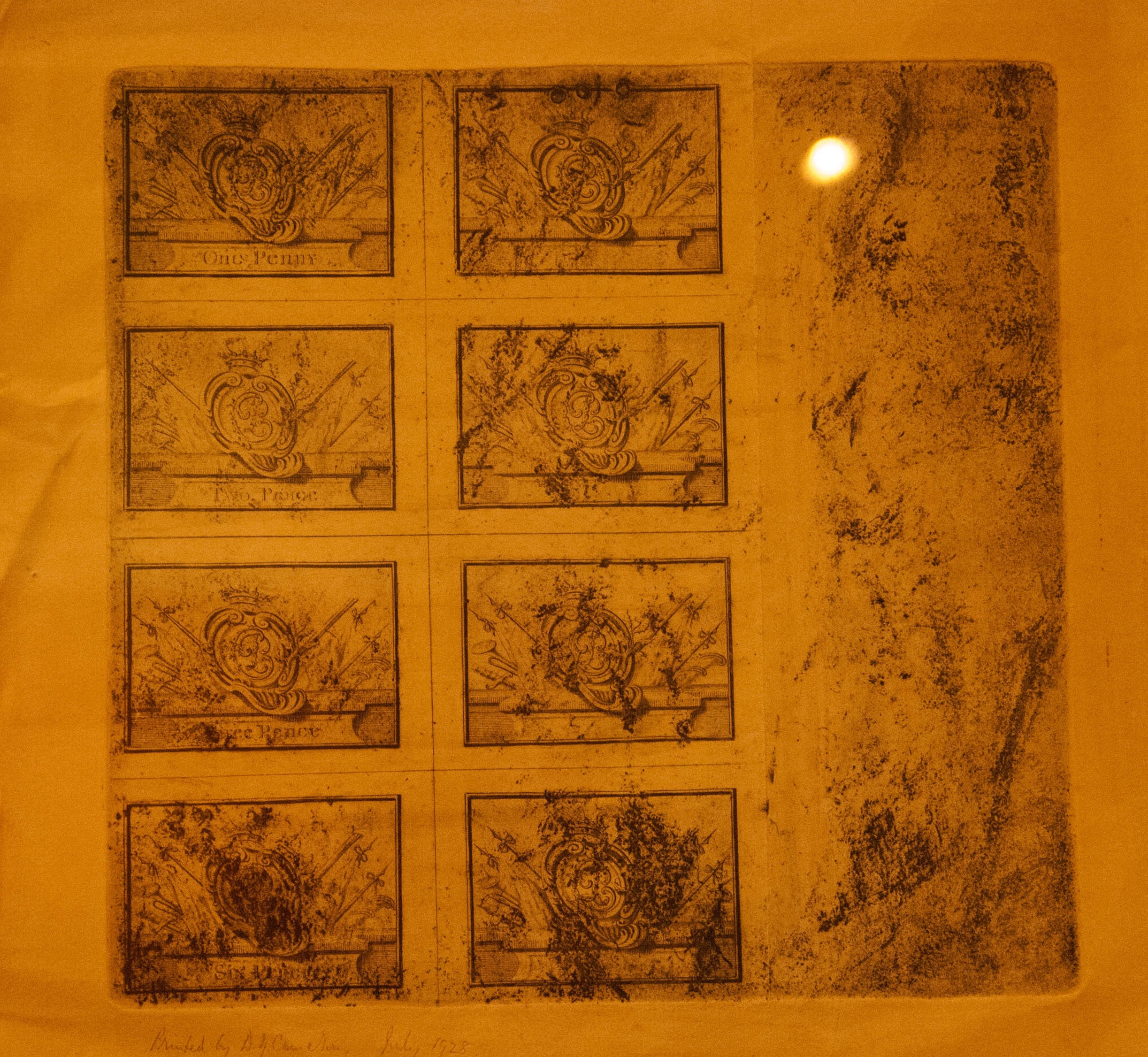
Jacobite bank notes printed from Strange's plate by DY Cameron

He was at the battles of Prestonpans and Falkirk Muir in the Young Pretender's lifeguards; and was in hiding for some months after the Battle of Culloden.

== Voluntary exile ==
After the amnesty Strange went to London and, carrying with him the Prince's seal, which had been left behind in Scotland, to Rouen, a centre of exiled Jacobites. There he studied anatomy under Claude-Nicolas Le Cat, and drawing under Jean-Baptiste Descamps. In 1749 he moved to Paris and placed himself under the engraver Jacques-Philippe Le Bas. There he learned drypoint and returned in 1750 to London.

After a period of dealing in prints and working in London as engraver, Strange fell out with potential patrons at court, including Lord Bute. Princess Augusta of Saxe-Gotha wished an engraving to be made of a portrait of Frederick, Prince of Wales, her late husband, by Allan Ramsay, and one of Bute. Strange found the price too low, and refused the commission via William Chambers; it was taken up in 1758 by William Wynne Ryland who rose in royal favour under George III.

Strange went to Italy in 1760. His connections afforded him a passport for travel in France—this was the height of the Seven Years' War—and introductions through Johann Georg Wille to Johann Joachim Winckelmann and Anton Raphael Mengs, and through Horace Walpole to Horace Mann. He studied at the Academy of St. Luke in Rome. He encountered Richard Dalton on a mission to copy Italian artworks that overlapped with his own plans, and a future rival in Francesco Bartolozzi. He returned to England in 1765, with an international reputation as engraver already established.

== Later life ==
Back in London, Strange exhibited pictures which he had collected, and prepared critical and descriptive catalogues. In 1768, troubles in the Incorporated Society of Artists, of which Strange was a member, led to the foundation of the Royal Academy. Strange opposed those breaking away, and he came to believe that the exclusion from the academy of engravers was levelled against himself. His rival Francesco Bartolozzi was elected, ostensibly as a painter. With other engravers (William Sharp, John Hall, and William Woollett), Strange declined associate membership. In 1775 he published on his grievances in An Inquiry into the Rise and Establishment of the Royal Academy of Arts. He then took his family over to Paris, where they remained in the Rue d'Enfer until 1780.

Strange wished to engrave Anthony van Dyck's portrait of Queen Henrietta Maria, which belonged to George III. He obtained access to the picture via Benjamin West, a friend, and the print was published. in Paris in 1784, along with one of the Vandyck of Charles I on his horse. He was received by Louis XVI and Marie Antoinette. Then he engraved West's picture of The Apotheosis of the Royal Children, finishing in 1786, and on 5 January 1787 was knighted by George III.

== Death ==
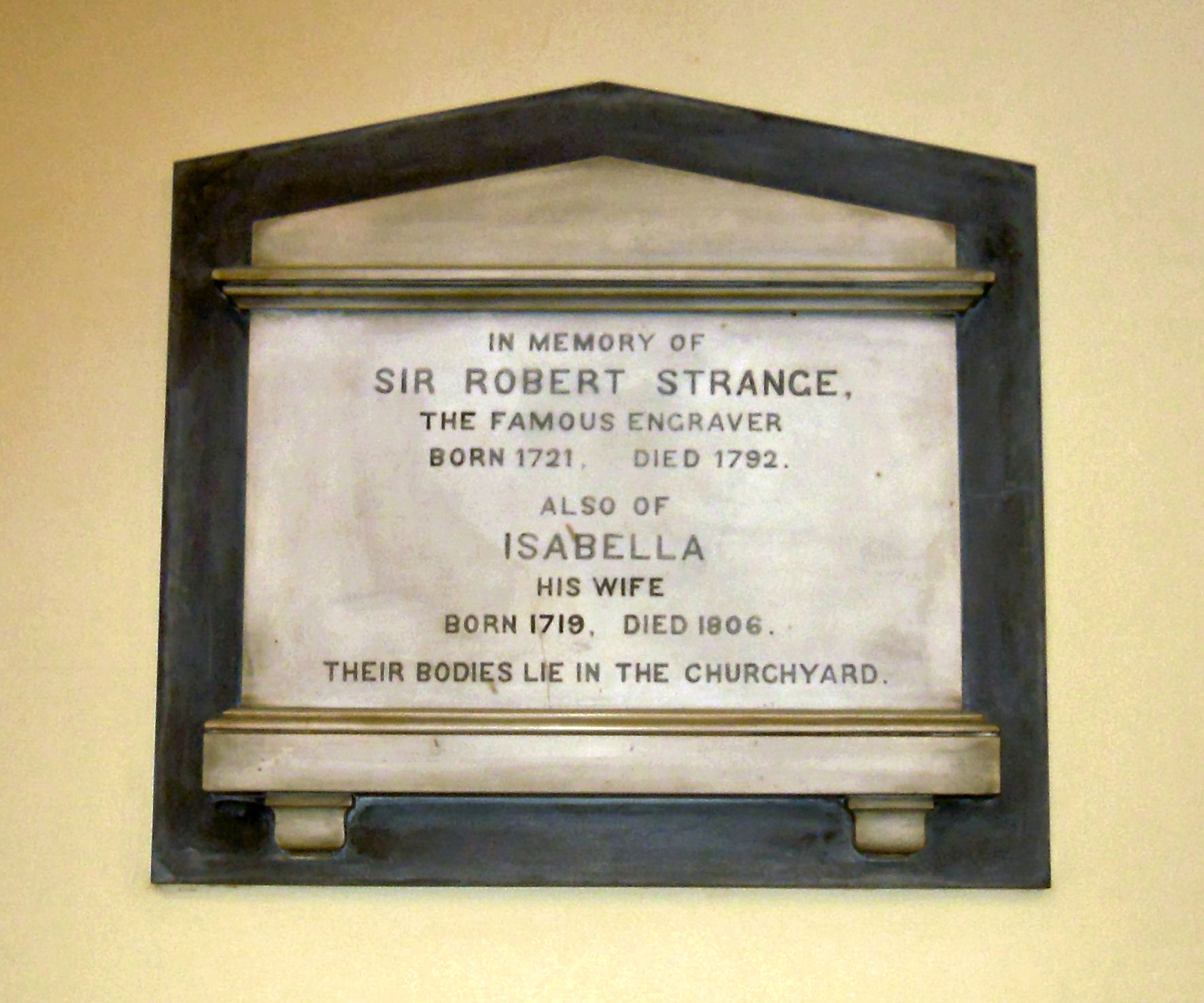
Memorial plaque to Robert Strange at St Paul's, Covent Garden

Strange died at his house, No. 52 Great Queen Street, Lincoln's Inn Fields, on 5 July 1792, and was buried at St. Paul's, Covent Garden. Besides Strange's portrait by Greuze, there is a portrait by Romney and one by Raeburn.

== Works ==
Strange published a portrait of the Young Pretender at the time of the 1745 rebellion. In France he engraved Carl Vanloo's Cupid, with Wouverman's Return from Market. In London his engraved works included the Magdalen and Cleopatra of Guido Reni, and the Apollo and Marsyas of Andrea Sacchi. During four years in Italy he was engaged in making copies of pictures to be engraved on his return, always using his own drawings. Of these drawings most of the water-colours went to Lord Zetland, and the chalks to Lord Wemyss. Many of the engravings were executed and published at Paris. He declined remunerative work such as book-plates and book illustrations. For Bruce of Kinnaird, he engraved the illustrations for Bruce's work on Pæstum, but this was never published. Classical portraits in Thomas Blackwell's History of the Court of Augustus, assumed to be his, are unsigned and not otherwise authenticated.

Technically, Strange habitually employed drypoint, and was followed by Raffaele Morghen, William Woollett, and William Sharp. He disliked the stipple engraving of Bartolozzi. He planned a series of 50 of his major works as legacy, from early in his career. Eighty sets of selected impressions of these were bound in atlas folio, with a dedication to the king (composed mainly by Blair), and published in 1790, with a portrait after Jean-Baptiste Greuze, and an introduction describing the progress of engraving. Apart from Van Dyck, he chose mainly Italian masters.

== Family ==
Shortly before the Jacobite rising of 1745 Strange fell in love with Isabella, daughter of William Lumisden (who was son of Andrew Lumsden) and sister of Andrew Lumisden, a strong Jacobite supporter. In 1747 they were married clandestinely. Isabella's letters were published by James Dennistoun. She died in 1806.

Of Strange's children, his eldest daughter Mary Bruce Strange (1748–1784) was artistic. His eldest son was James Charles Stuart Strange (1753–1840), a Member of Parliament. Strange's second son was Thomas Andrew Lumisden Strange. A third son, Robert Montagu, was major-general in the Madras army.

== Gallery ==
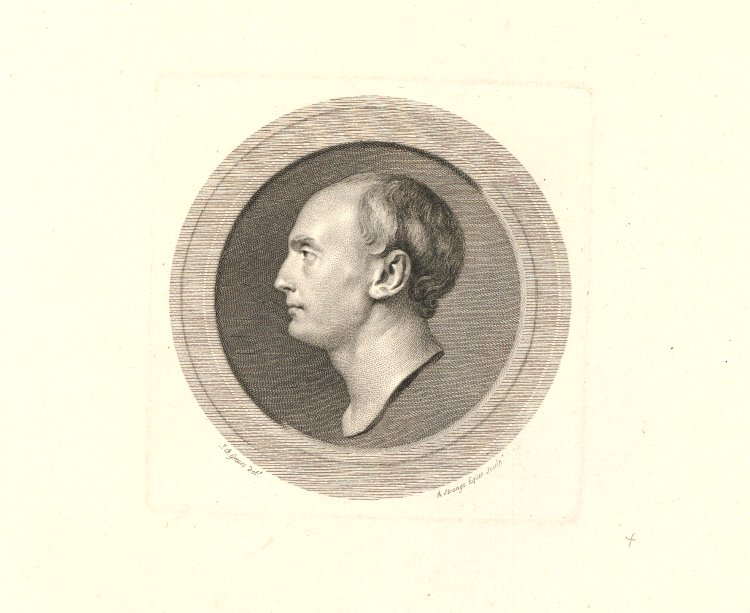
Robert Strange, engraving by the artist himself after Jean-Baptiste Greuze

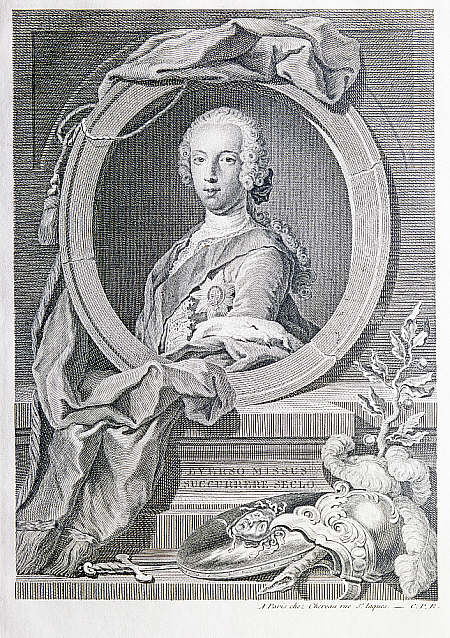
Charles Edward Stuart, the Young Pretender, 1745 engraving by Robert Strange

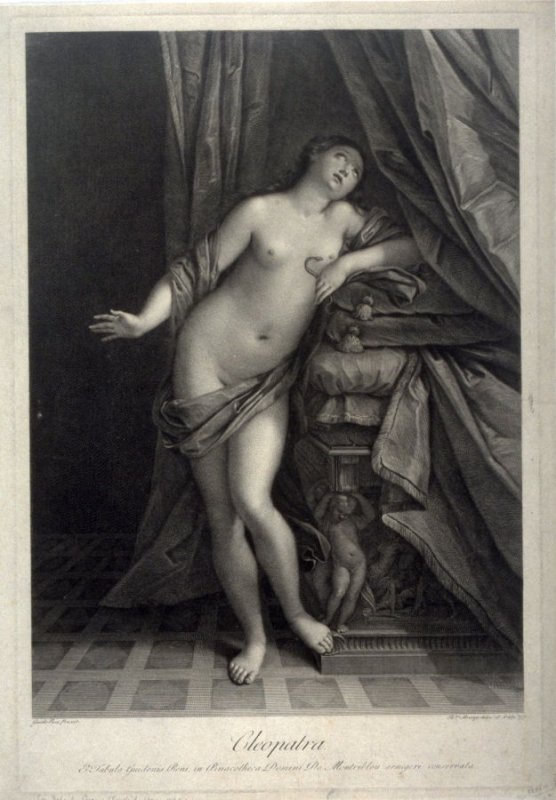
Cleopatra, by Robert Strange (after Guido Reni), 1777

== Notes ==
Attribution

This article incorporates text from a publication now in the public domain: Lee, Sidney, ed. (1898). "Strange, Robert". Dictionary of National Biography. Vol. 55. London: Smith, Elder & Co.
