= Order of Saint Joachim =

Confraternal order of chivalry

The Equestrian, Secular and Chapterial Order of Saint Joachim
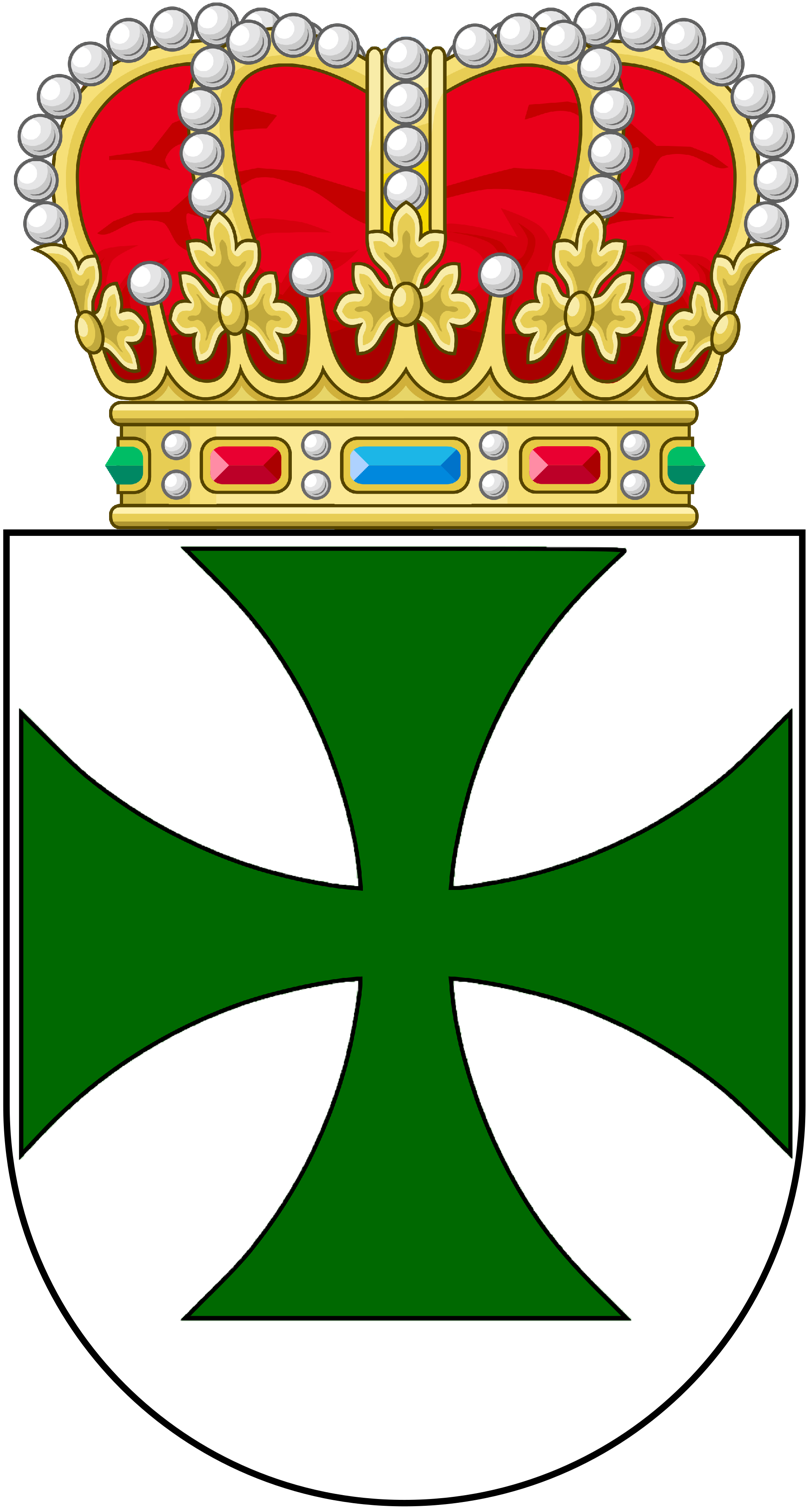
- Arms of the order
- Type: Order of chivalry
- Established: 1755; 271 years ago
- Country: Holy Roman Empire (Past); Prussia (Past); Saxe-Coburg-Gotha (Past); Bulgaria (Past); France (Past); United Kingdom; United States; Canada; Austria; Germany
- Motto: Latin: Junxit Amicus Amor (Love hath united friends)
- Criteria: Charity and Religious Tolerance
- Status: Currently constituted
- Founder: See list
- Grand Master: HE Chevalier Stephen Lautens GCJ of Lindsell
- Classes: Knight Grand Commander (GCJ); Knight Commander / Dame Commander (KCJ/DCJ); Knight / Dame (KJ/DJ); Knight Expectant / Dame Expectant; Postulant
- Website: stjoachimorder.org
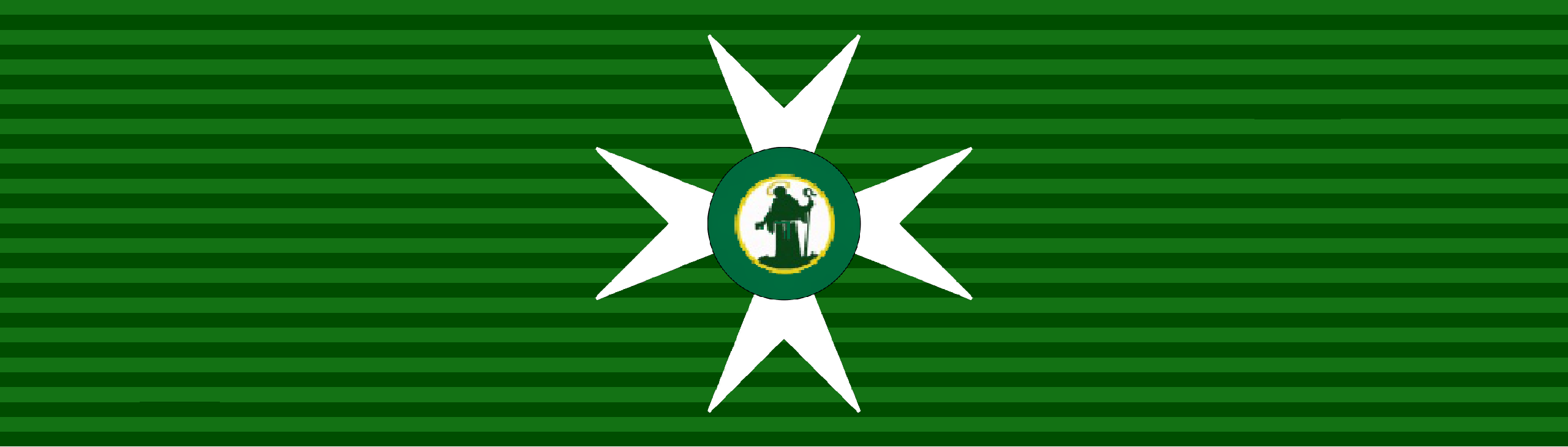
- Ribbon bar

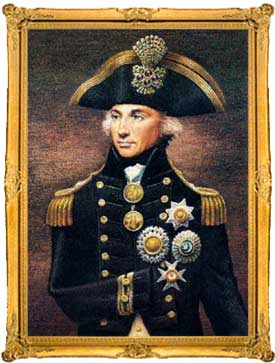
Lord Nelson

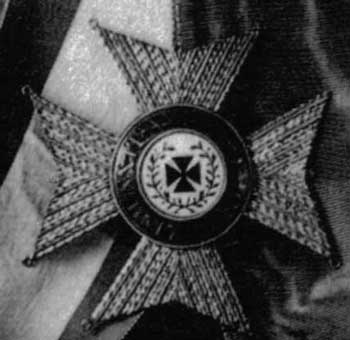
Lord Nelson's star

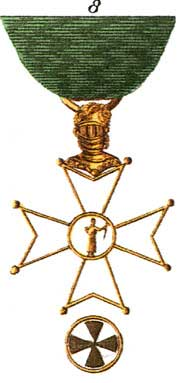
Knight

The Order of Saint Joachim (The Equestrian, Secular and Chapterial Order of Saint Joachim) is an order of chivalry founded in 1755 to promote religious tolerance in Europe, and continues to exist today. Admiral Horatio Nelson accepted the Grand Cross of the Order in 1802.

== 18th century ==
The "Equestrian, Secular and Chapterial Order of Saint Joachim" was established in 1755 by a group of German nobles. Prince Christian Franz von Sachsen-Coburg Saalfeld was installed as its first Grand Master on June 20, 1756, a position he held until 1773.

The Order had fourteen founding members who were nobles and military leaders of the Holy Roman Empire:

- Duke of Württemberg-Oels
- Prince Piccolomini
- Count von Clary und Aldringen
- Baron von Eib
- Ritter Fachner von Trauenstein
- Keck von Schwarzbach
- Count von Kollowrat-Krakowsky
- Baron von Milchling
- Baron Moser von Filseck
- Count von Nostitz
- Baron Reichlin von Meldegg
- Wiedersperger von Wiedersperg
- Baron von Zobel von Giebelstadt

Having seen the consequences of ongoing religious wars in Europe, the Order's founders dedicated themselves to "worship the Supreme Being, show tolerance towards all religions, loyalty towards their princes, support the needs of their military, the poor, widows and orphans." [Perrot: 1821]. The Order was uniquely composed of both Protestant and Catholic nobles and leaders at a time when religion violently divided Europe and the German states within the Holy Roman Empire, and other knightly orders allied themselves exclusively with one faith or the other.

When the Order was founded in 1755, it was originally with the name "The Knights of the Order of Jonathan, Defenders of the Honour of Divine Providence". In 1767 the reference to Jonathan was removed from the name. Finally, in 1785 a further change was made, and the Order's constitution was revised by the General Chapter to rename it "The Equestrian, Secular and Chapterial Order of Saint Joachim".

Albert Pike, prominent American Mason and American Civil War general, associated the Order of Saint Joachim with Illuminati-related Enlightenment societies. In his 1883 work, "A Historical Inquiry In Regard To The Grand Constitutions Of 1786", he stated that the disbanded Illuminati continued on through the various branches of the Rosicrucian Order, including the later versions of the Orden des Gold- und Rosenkreutz (or Order of the Golden and Rosy Cross in English), namely, the Order of Perfect Initiates of Asia, or the Asiatic Brethren, and the various Orders of Light, specifically mentioning "The Order of Saint Joachim (St. Jonathan)". However, having been founded in 1755, The Order of Saint Joachim pre-existed the Illuminati. Records show that a few Illuminati were members of the early Order of Saint Joachim, specifically Count von Kollowrat-Krakowsky, as well as Freemasons and Rosicrucians. The Order of Saint Joachim had direct connection to the Gold- und Rosenkreutz, founded in 1777, which also had Illuminati and Masonic roots. The Gold- und Rosenkreutz was Hermetic in character, drawing heavily on Eastern and Islamic mysticism. The Gold- und Rosenkreutz was headed by Johann Karl Baron von Ecker und Eckhoffen, who in 1787 was Chancellor of The Order of Saint Joachim. Baron von Ecker und Eckhoffen is named as a member of several other mystic societies, including the Christian Masonry of Bohemia in 1756, and the Asiatic Brethren.

The Order of Saint Joachim was recognized in the late 18th and early 19th centuries by several contemporary sovereigns and states. Leopold II, King of Hungary and Bohemia (later Holy Roman Emperor) formally acknowledged and sanctioned the wearing of the insignia of the Order on May 23, 1790 with a document of Royal Concession. He appointed the Comte Christian von Leiningen, a knight of The Order of Saint Joachim and relative of the Grand Master, to be Chamberlain of the Imperial Palace. On 27 April 1791 King Friedrich Wilhelm II of Prussia issued a similar Royal Grant recognizing the legitimacy of the Order and permitting the wearing of the insignia of The Order of Saint Joachim on Prussian officers' military uniforms.

== 19th century ==
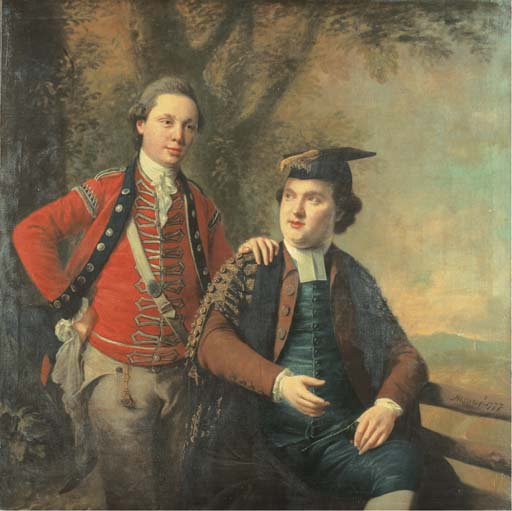
Sir Levett Hanson of the Order of St Joachim and General Richard Wilford in portrait by artist Nathaniel Hone, R.A., 1777

In 1801, 'Sir' Levett Hanson wrote to Admiral Lord Horatio Nelson offering him membership of the order to recognize his victory at the Battle of the Nile. Following the review and approval of the English College of Arms, the King's Warrant approving the acceptance and wear of the insignia of the Order of Saint Joachim was granted. Nelson was wearing the breast cross of the Order of Saint Joachim at the Battle of Trafalgar and is still seen on the famous "Trafalgar coat" in the National Maritime Museum in Greenwich, UK. Several other Englishmen later received the King's Warrant to accept the Order of Saint Joachim, including Nelson's brother, Viscount Merton, General Sir Charles Imhoff, and Philippe d'Auvergne, Prince de Boullion, Rear Admiral of the Blue. In 1802, Hanson published An Accurate Historical Account of all the Orders of Knighthood at present existing in Europe casting the Order of Saint Joachim as equal to existing chivalric orders and dedicating the work to Nelson.

Knighthoods granted by The Order of Saint Joachim to British subjects and confirmed by the King's Warrant also entitled to holder to assume the title of 'Sir' as in the case of Sir Charles Imhoff where "King George the Third not only permitted Imhoff... to accept the insignia and rank of a Knight Commander of the Order of St. Joachim, but granted him at the same time leave to assume, in virtue of that foreign decoration, the titular distinction of a Knight of England."

In 1834 one critic – George Frederick Beltz, Lancaster Herald – claimed that the Order seemed to be domiciled wherever Hanson found himself, and that 'Knighthoods' were available to anyone with sufficient funds. "It was long understood," he wrote, "that moyennant a certain not inconsiderable deposit at a banking house at Pall-mall, the distinction was at the service of any one who might have a fancy for it; and that letters-missive were soon forthcoming from 'Sir' Levett, containing due notification of election by the 'equestrian, secular and chapteral Order,' at its last sitting at Bamberg, Hamburgh, Lubeck or wherever that personage happened, at the time, to be domiciliated."

Napoleon's brother-in-law, Joachim Murat (March 25, 1767 – October 13, 1815), a Marshal of France, usurped the grand mastership of the Order of Saint Joachim in 1806 when he was made the Grand Duke of the newly created "Duchy of Berg and Cleves". During his term as Grand Duke of Berg and Cleves (March 15, 1806 to August 1, 1808 when he left to become King of Naples) Joachim Murat declared himself the Grand Master of The Order of Saint Joachim, and expanded the Order to include members of the French Legion of Honour. His authority was never recognized by the rest of the Order in exile.

Following the Treaty of Vienna, The Order of Saint Joachim continued to be associated with the House of Sachsen-Coburg und Gotha. Ernest I, Duke of Saxe-Coburg-Saalfeld (2 January 1784 – 29 January 1844) continued to award the Order of Saint Joachim. A letter from 1821 exists from a Dr. Joseph Romain Louis de Kirckhoff (also de Kerckhov) thanking Ernst I, Herzog von Sachsen-Coburg und Gotha for awarding him the Order of Saint Joachim. His son, Ernest II, (21 June 1818 – 22 August 1893) is known to have included the Order's post-nominals "K.J." among his awards and honours. Bulgarian Tsar Ferdinand I of Bulgaria (26 February 1861 – 10 September 1948) a prince of the Koháry branch of the ducal family of Saxe-Coburg-Gotha, was popularly pictured with the insignia of The Order of St Joachim in 1888, although the connection between the two is unknown.

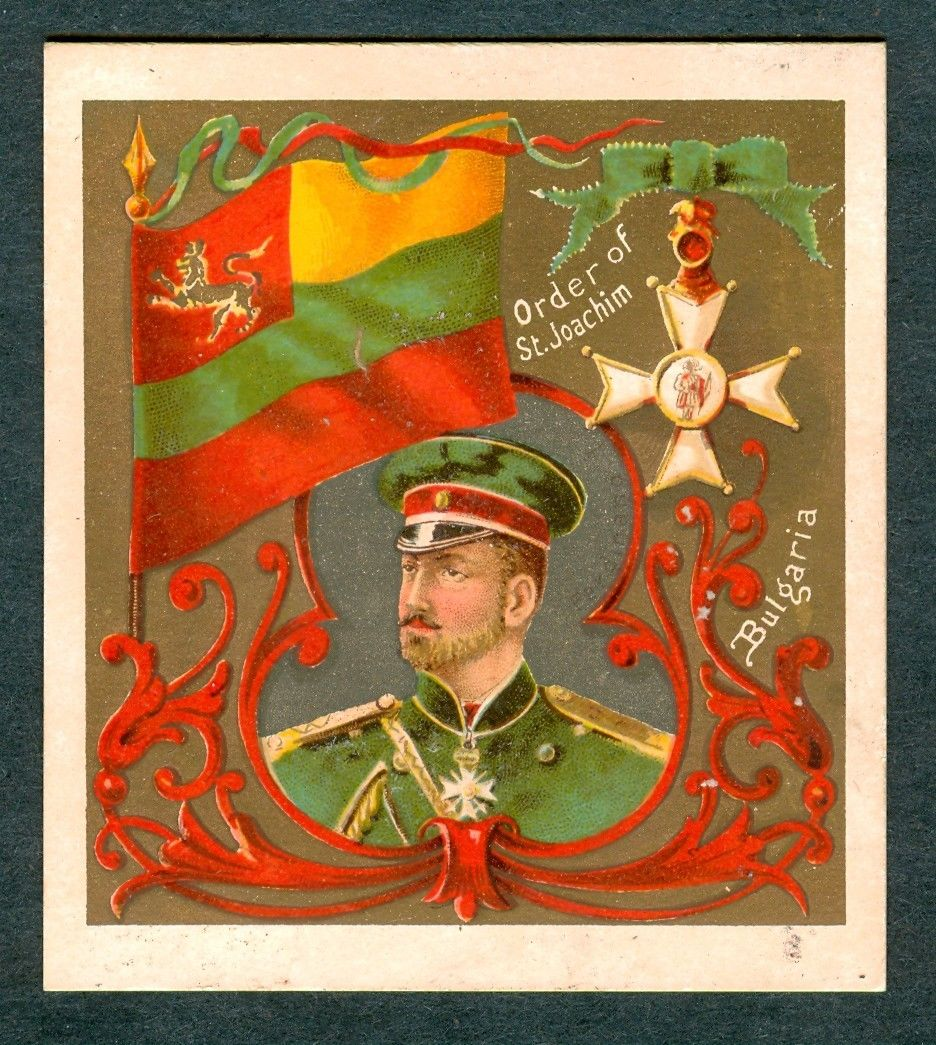
1888 cigarette card published by Kinney Bros. Tobacco Co. from the series “International Cards” - N238 in Burdick ’s American Card Catalogue.

== 20th and 21st centuries ==
In the early 19th century the order was said to have "enjoyed considerable recognition in the early 19th century, including support from the English College of Arms". However in the late 19th the Order had reportedly 'drifted into obscurity'.

A manuscript dated November, 1892 is a translation by F.G. Irwin of a document in the Paris Arsenal Library of a French Masonic ceremony from the “Rite of Adoption Ritual of 35º Chevalieres of St Joachim." The ritual described is almost identical to the Order of Saint Joachim’s Ceremony of Investiture from the early 1800s. The French 35th Degree also has added Masonic-style floor work, wands for the officers, signs and a “secret” handshake which do not appear in the Order’s published ceremony. Because the French ceremony includes both men and women performing the ritual, it likely belongs to the French Grand Orient de France branch of Masonry. Of interest is the opening of the “Court” where it is stated that the reason for the gathering is for “the purpose of studying the Ritual and practices of Freemasonry and tracing its connection with the chivalric orders and the Rite of Adoption, and especially with the Order of Saint Joachim.”

The Order of Saint Joachim was reorganized in 1929 as “politically neutral” and specifically rejecting any connection to Freemasonry or the earlier requirement and division of the Order into noble and non-noble classes. According to the official history of the Order published in 1948, The Order of Saint Joachim was forced to “go quiet” during the Nazi period in Germany, but its members maintained informal connections to one another. From 1948 the Order was led by a "Reorganization Council" and in 1988 the Order was led by Helmut von Bräundle-Falkensee as Grand Master, until his death on 14 October 2007. Bräundle-Falkensee was an Austrian who was also founder and Secretary General of the Austrian Albert Schweitzer Society. After his death, a Canadian barrister named Stephen Lautens (b. 1959) was elected the new Grand Master.

The Order has its Chapterhouse in England and additional Commanderies in the United States, Canada and Austria. It is registered as a charity in the UK (Registered Charity No. 1047873) and supports numerous causes including care for the homeless, ex-servicemen, hospitals and children's charities. In Canada, the Order is organized as a federal not-for-profit corporation, where its general charitable purpose is to promote religious tolerance, support the widows and orphans of war, refugees and indigent servicemen and women. In Canada it also operates a charitable arm, The Noble Hearts Foundation (Charitable Registration Number: 83471 3000 RR0001).

An exhibition displaying the heraldry of Admiral Nelson at the College of Arms in 2005 featured a replica of Nelson's uniform with its honorary blazons. Among the orders of merit worn by Nelson was the Order of St Joachim. The star, said the College of Arms incorrectly in its newsletter, was "the bogus Order of St. Joachim created and hawked around the Courts of Europe by 'Sir' Levett Hanson." In a subsequent newsletter several months later, the editors issued a retraction: "The Order of St. Joachim referred to in the last issue," said the College-of-Arms, "was not (as there stated) created by Levett Hanson, but dated back to an order founded in 1755 by a group of mostly German princes."

In the British Broadcasting Corporation 2010 project "A History of the World in 100 Objects", one of the objects chosen was the insignia of the Order of St. Joachim awarded to Philippe d'Auvergne, Vice Admiral of the Blue, in 1803.

== Status and legitimacy ==
The Order of Saint Joachim did not owe its existence to a royal or noble house, or "fons honorum". Its founder and first Grand Master, Prince Christian Franz von Saxen-Coburg-Saalfeld, was the son of a sovereign duke, but never himself a ruler. The next three Grand Masters were sovereign rulers (Duke de Monfort followed by successive counts of Leinigen), and would technically qualify as a "fons" of royal patron or protector of a confraternity and noble company, like those found in Spain. Instead of being a hereditary position, the grand mastership was elected by its members. Writing in 1828, English College of Arms Windsor Herald, Francis Townsend, Esq., FSA, stated: "This Order owes its foundation to no crowned head, but has been recognized both in Great Britain and abroad, as an Order of Knighthood."

The post-nominals of a Knight of the Order of Saint Joachim ("K.J.") were listed in "Debrett's Baronetage of England" between 1815, and around 1840, and were similarly published in the 1832 "A Key to Both Houses of Parliament".

== Notes and sources ==
Notes

Sources

- Hanson, Levett: "The Court of Saxe-Weimar" with German translation in: Schulz, Heide: "The Court of Saxe-Weimar", Heidelberg 2011, ISBN 978-3-8253-5887-7, p. 68-71 and 190-214
- Hanson, Levett (1802). An Accurate Historical Account of All The Orders of Knighthood At Present Existing In Europe. Vol. 1. J. White - (reprint Kessinger Publishing). ISBN 0-7661-5415-7.
