= John Ward (academic) =

English teacher

John Ward (1679?–1758) was an English teacher, supporter of learned societies, and biographer, remembered for his work on the Gresham College professors, of which he was one.

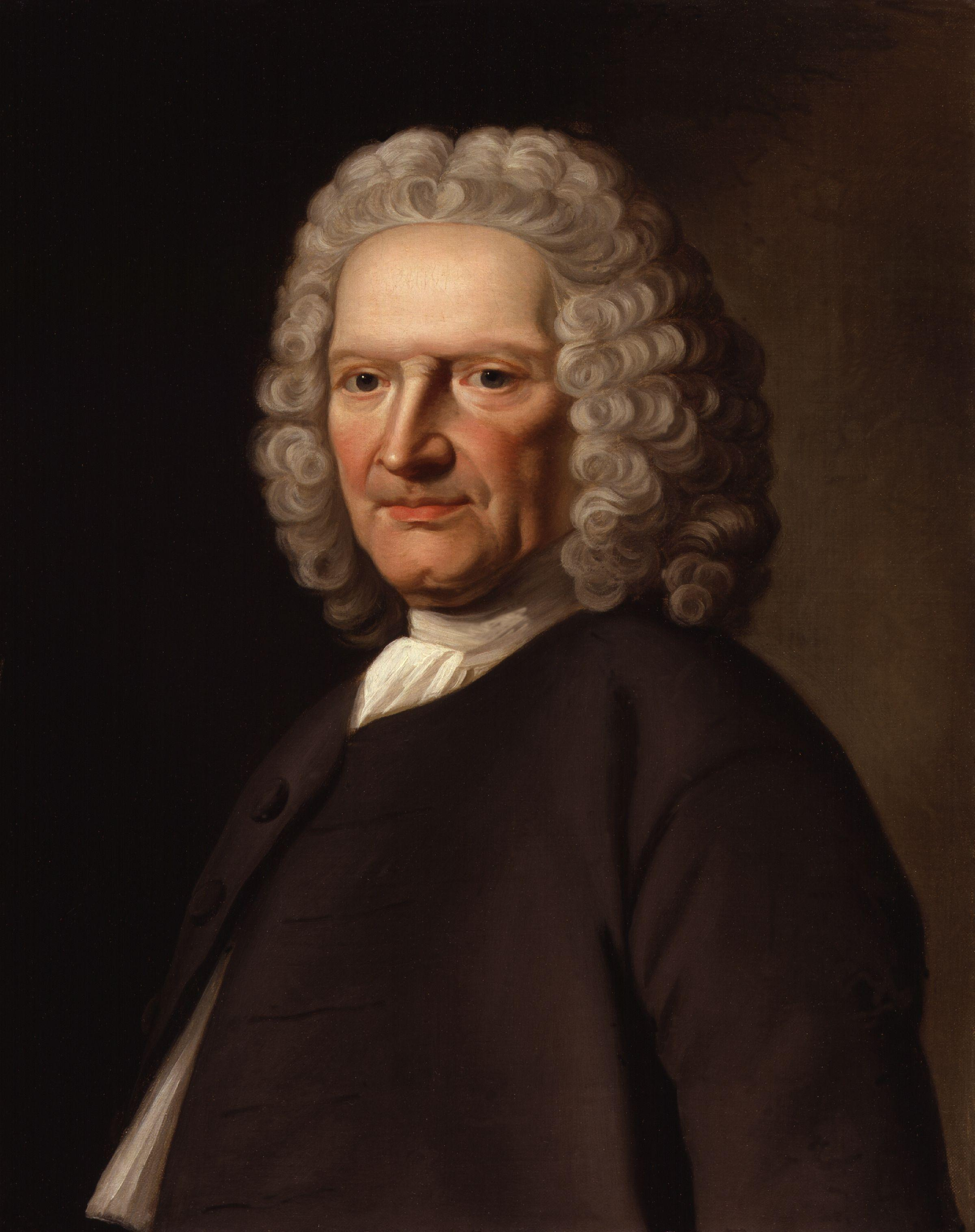
John Ward, portrait by Joseph Samuel Webster.

== Life ==
Son of John Ward, a Baptist minister, by his wife, Constancy Rayner, he was born in London about 1679. For some years he was a clerk in the navy office, studying in spare time with the assistance of John Ker, who kept an academy, first in Highgate and afterwards in St. John's Square, Clerkenwell. He left the navy office in 1710, and opened a school in Tenter Alley, Moorfields, which he kept for many years.

In 1712 he became one of the earliest members of a society composed principally of divines and lawyers, who met periodically in order to read discourses upon the civil law or upon the law of nature and nations. On 1 September 1720 he was chosen Gresham Professor of Rhetoric.

Ward was elected a Fellow of the Royal Society on 30 November 1723. He was often elected a member of the council, and in 1752 he was appointed one of the vice-presidents. In August 1733 he made a journey through Holland and Flanders to Paris. He was elected on 5 February 1736 a Fellow of the Society of Antiquaries, of which he became director on 15 January 1747. In April 1753 he was appointed vice-president of that society.

He also joined another society formed by a number of noblemen and gentlemen for the encouragement of learning. Among the works printed at their expense were John Davies's edition of the Dissertations of Maximus of Tyre, issued under the supervision of Ward, and the De Natura Animalium of Claudius Aelianus, edited by Abraham Gronovius, who acknowledges the assistance he received from Ward. On 20 May 1751 the University of Edinburgh conferred on Ward the degree of LL.D. He afterwards became a member of the Gentlemen's Society at Spalding. On the establishment of the British Museum he was elected one of the trustees.

He died in his apartments in Gresham College on 17 October 1758, and his remains were interred in the dissenters' burial-ground, Bunhill Fields.

== Works ==
His works include:

- De ordine, sive de venusta et eleganti tum vocabulorum, tum membrorum sententiæ collocatione, London, 1712.
- De Asse et partibus ejus commentarius, London, 1719 (anon.); reprinted in Monumenta vetustatis Kempiana, 1720.
- Ad Con. Middletoni de medicorum apud veteres Romanos degentium conditione dissertationem, quæ servilem atque ignobilem eam fuisse contendit, responsio, London [February 1726–7]. Conyers Middleton published a defence of his dissertation in 1727, and to this Ward replied in Dissertationis … de medicorum Romæ degentium conditione ignobili et servili defensio examinata, London, 1728.
- The Lives of the Professors of Gresham College, to which is prefixed the Life of the Founder, Sir Thomas Gresham, London, 1740.
- Four Essays upon the English Language, London, 1758.
- A System of Oratory, delivered in a course of lectures publickly read at Gresham College, London, London, 1759, 2 vols.
- Dissertations upon several Passages of the Sacred Scriptures, London, 1761.

Several manuscript compilations by him are preserved in the British Museum. He also rendered assistance in the publication of Jacques Auguste de Thou's History (1728); Robert Ainsworth's Latin Dictionary, 1736, and also the editions of 1746 and 1752; the works of George Benson; and the second edition of Martin Folkes's Table of English Gold Coins. He translated into Latin the eighth edition of Richard Mead's Discourse of the Plague (1723), edited William Lily's Latin Grammar in 1732, and contributed numerous papers to the Philosophical Transactions.
