= Ancient Order of Saint George named Order of the Four Roman Emperors =

Historic chivalric order

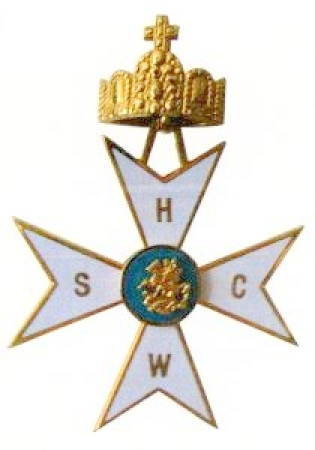
- Insignia with the Crown

Awarded by House of Limburg-Stirum
- Type: Order of chivalry
- Established: 1308
- Royal house: Luxemburg / Limburg-Styrum
- Religious affiliation: Christian interdenominational
- Ribbon: Light blue / yellow
- Motto: ILLUSTRIORIBUS ET NOBILITATI
- Status: discontinued
- Founder: Henry VII
- Governor: Gundakar Prinz von und zu Liechtenstein
- Grades: Grand Cross; Commander; Knight
- Ribbon of the order

The Ancient Order of Saint George named Order of the Four Roman Emperors (German: Alte Orden vom St. Georg genannt Orden der Vier Römischen Kaiser) is a historic chivalric order, first established in 1308. It was re-founded as a secular community on 6 December 1768 by Count Philipp Ferdinand of Limburg-Stirum.

== History ==
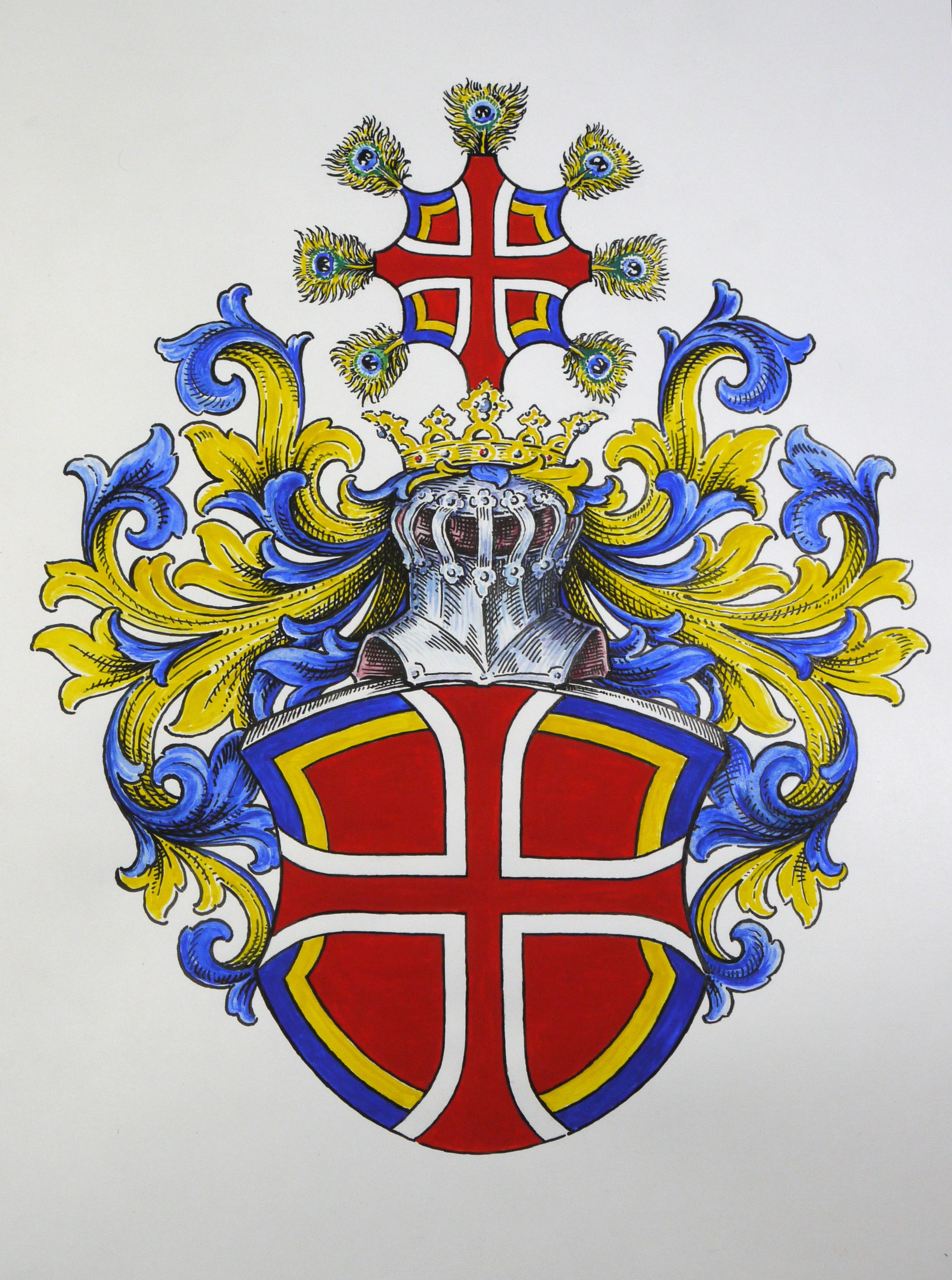
Crest of the Ancient Order of Saint George

=== Early history ===
The history of the Ancient Order of Saint George dates back to the two knightly associations of the House of Luxembourg in the 14th and 15th century, when in 1308 King of Germany (and later Holy Roman Emperor) Henry VII endowed the Order of the Ancient Nobility (Orden vom alten Adel) and in 1408 the King of Hungary (and later Holy Roman Emperor) Sigismund instituted the Order of the Dragon. Both founders were striving to fortify Christendom and knightly virtues.

As a result of his defeat by the Ottomans at the Battle of Nicopolis in 1396, Sigismund placed the so-called Confraternity With the Dragon of Ancient Nobility under the protection of Saint George, which explains the name combination of the order, which is still used today.

With Sigismund's death in 1437, the line of Luxembourg emperors became extinct and the order remained affiliated to the Holy Roman Emperors of the House of Habsburg. When in 1769 Count Philipp Ferdinand re-established the community as a dynastic order of the House of Limburg-Stirum, he also wished to honour the four emperors from the Luxembourg dynasty, namely Henry VII (reigned 1308–1313), Charles IV (1347–1378), Wenceslas (1378–1410), and Sigismund (1410–1437). Twelve commanderies with incomes of 500 gulden were attached to the order. Knights and Commanders gave at their nomination, a substantial amount of money or a territory as commandery to the order. They could still enjoy the revenues of such territories, but left it to the order afterwards.

=== Modern times ===
On 6 December 1768 the Order was newly founded as a secular order of chivalry by Philipp Ferdinand Count von Limburg-Styrum. Among its aims was the preservation of the memory of the Four Roman Emperors of the House of Luxembourg, Henry VII (ruled 1308–1313), Charles IV (ruled 1347–1378), Wenceslas (ruled 1378–1410) and Sigismund (ruled 1410–1437).

The members of the essential ecumenical order stemmed predominantly from the German, Flemish, Walloon and French aristocracy. Its division into German and French speaking parts was laid down in the first reorganization of the order in 1789.

In 1806, as consequence of the dissolution of the Holy Roman Empire the sovereignty over the County of Styrum by the House of Limburg-Styrum was mediatised and the counts lost their rule over their estates. Thereby the order lost its status as a dynastic order and, in the absence of a grand master, the order went into abeyance.

A second reorganizational convention was called in 1838 by the vice-chancellor Dr. Joseph Vicomte de Kerckhove-Varent, which opened the membership of the order to those of non-aristocratic descent, while emphasizing however conservative objectives. Its official language became now German, since French had widely ceased its currency, as a result of the French Revolution. Ackermann, however, in his guide, published in 1855, listed the order as extinct. Similarly, Archbishop H.E. Cardinale, wrote, that the order ceased to exist. An examination of the Dutch High Council of Nobility (Hoge Raad van Adel) in 1886 gave the result that the order is extinct.

=== History in the 20th century until the present day ===
During a 1926 convent in Hanover, the order was again re-organized, under the governorate of the comital House of Stolberg and the princely House of Liechtenstein. Based on the reorganizational convention, the statutes were adapted under the guidance of the order's governor, Count Bernhard zu Stolberg-Stolberg, to consolidate the life within the order. From then on it was called the Ancient Order of Saint George named Order of the Four Roman Emperors, with bailiwicks of Wendland (along the river Elbe), Lower Saxony, North Rhine-Westphalia and Austria-Hungary. As a visual expression of the renewal of the order and in the spirit of its founders and patrons, the image of Saint George the dragon slayer was incorporated into the order's insignia.

Because of the political situation in the German Reich, in 1935 the seat of the order was transferred to Salzburg in the bailiwick of Austria-Hungary, from where it engaged actively against the National Socialism, for an independent Austria and for the reinstatement of its archducal House of Habsburg. Three years later, following Anschluss (Austria's annexation by the German Reich), the order was prohibited for political reasons by the Nazis. Like many other Christian associations, the order was officially dissolved, its assets confiscated and its activities forbidden (as it had already happened in Germany in 1934, after the National Socialists had seized power. The dissolution had taken place under the governor of the order, Prince Johannes von und zu Liechtenstein (a former Captain in the Austro-Hungarian Navy), who, after the irrevocable resignation of his predecessor, Count Bernhard zu Stolberg-Stolberg, had been unanimously elected (per acclamationem) at the knights' general convention on 19 June 1937.

While continuing to be recognized as governor by the remaining knights of the order during World War II, Prince Johannes safeguarded the continuity of the order and immediately after the war began building it up again with its seat in Vienna, Austria. His efforts of consolidation resulted in his official registration of the order in 1951 as Saint George's Club which he led as its president. This step was necessary, because of the still unclear legal situation of secular orders, which had been closed down during the Third Reich.

Under the next governor of the order, Count Karl von und zu Trauttmansdorff-Weinsberg, who had updated the order's statutes, which had officially been confirmed by the authorities in 1960, the Saint George's Club, was renamed the Ancient Order of Saint George, as the order is called today. Since then, its head and chief representative again carries the title Ordensgouverneur (Governor of the Order). As such, the Ancient Order of Saint George successfully exists to this day and holds annual meetings. Since the 19th century the order has upheld a firm loyalty to the archducal House of Austria. Accordingly, Dr. Otto von Habsburg was patron of the Ancient Order of Saint George from 1972 until his death in July 2011.

In 1999 Prince Gundakar von und zu Liechtenstein was elected governor of the order. Since 2001 Count Peter zu Stolberg-Stolberg has assisted him as vice chancellor, and since 2004 as the order's chancellor.

Certain people who had left the Ancient Order of Saint George at the end of 2007 founded an association with a similar name in January 2008. In 2011 it was renamed Order of St. George.

== Principles ==
According to its statutes, the Ancient Order of Saint George is open to members of all levels of society, professions and Christian denominations. In both public and private life, they fight against the roots and implications of the "eight evils": illness, desolation, homelessness, hunger, unkindness, guilt, indifference and disbelief. The order expects from its members impeccable conduct, respectability, sense of true nobility, Christian charity and morals, as well as strict adherence to law and order. Furthermore, the Order acknowledges Christian natural justice and ethics as the source of all rights. The aims of the order are also reflected in its Latin motto Illustrioribus et Nobilitati (for the distinguished and noble).

Saint George, patron saint of chivalry and the English Lord Chancellor, St. Thomas More (1487–1535), patron saint of lawyers, Christian statesmen and politicians, serve for members of the order as symbolic paragons for the conduct of life.

== Life within the order ==
Knights of Saint George are there for one another until the end of their lives, especially when another is in need of help and protection in a difficult situation in life. Besides its charitable activities, the order sees itself today as an opinion-forming think tank, hosting regular gatherings with professionals speaking about relevant social, cultural and political matters. The admission of novices as full members takes place at the order's festive Annual General Convention, around the memorial day of Saint George (23 April). At the same time, selected members are recognized for special merits. Since the year 2000, the order arranges every summer a 2-day philosophical symposium with high-level speakers on socio-politically relevant themes (e.g. 2012: "Natural Law vs. Legal Positivism", 2013: "Truth or Everything is Relative", 2014: "From the Nation State to Supranationality").

== Governors of the order in recent times ==
The governors of the Ancient Order of Saint George since its reorganizational convention in 1926:

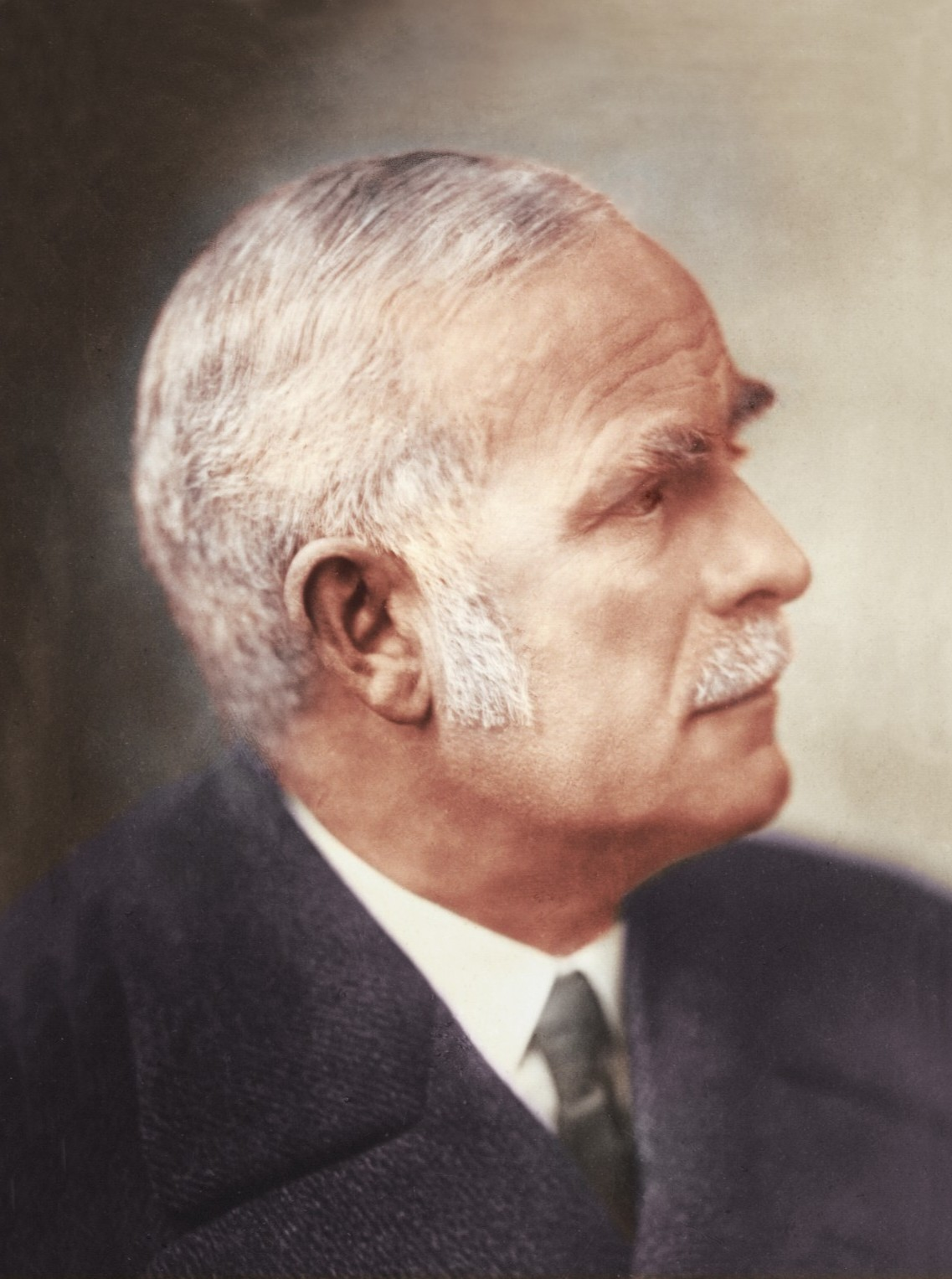
Count Bernhard zu Stolberg-Stolberg

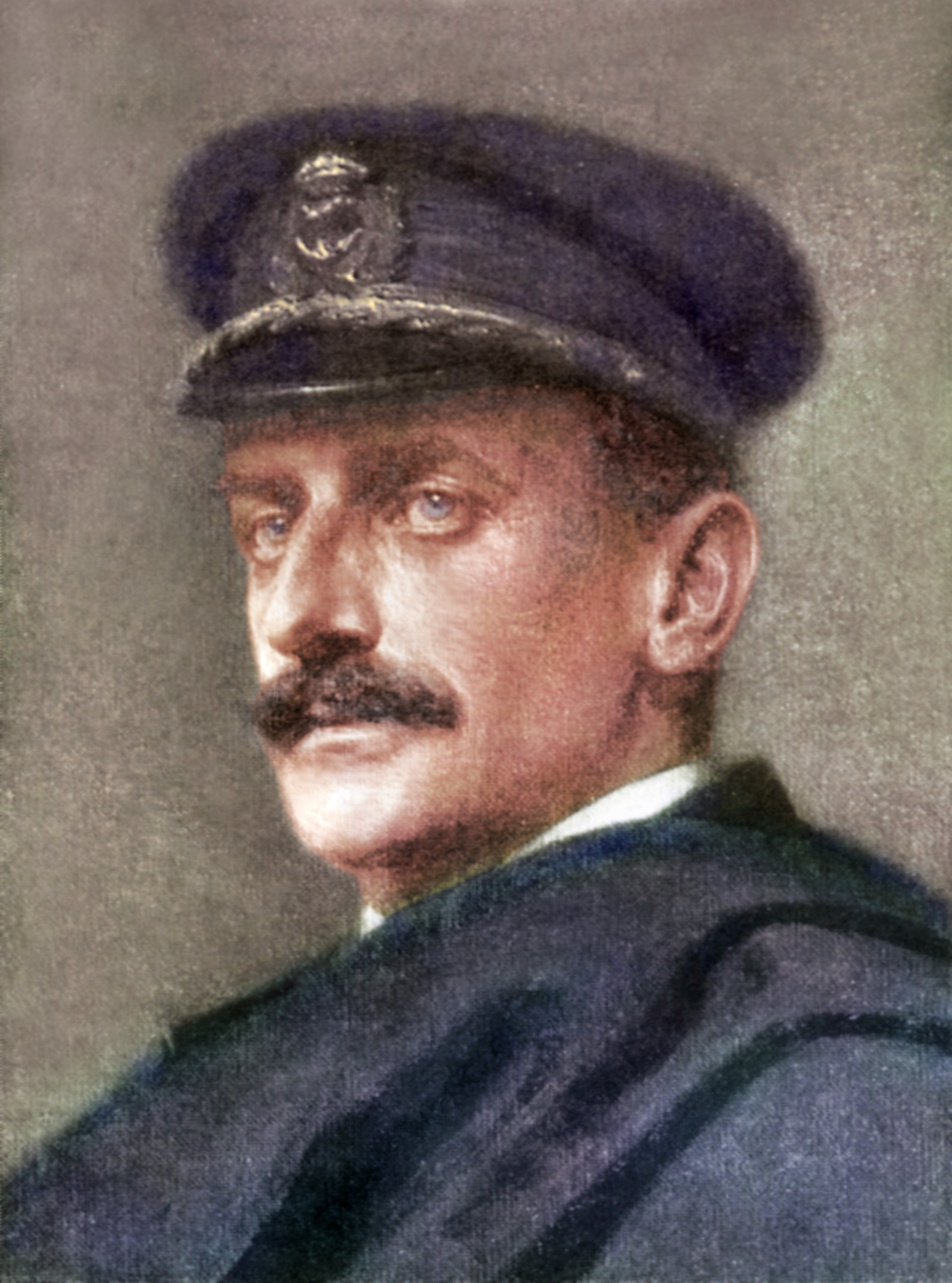
Prince Johannes von und zu Liechtenstein

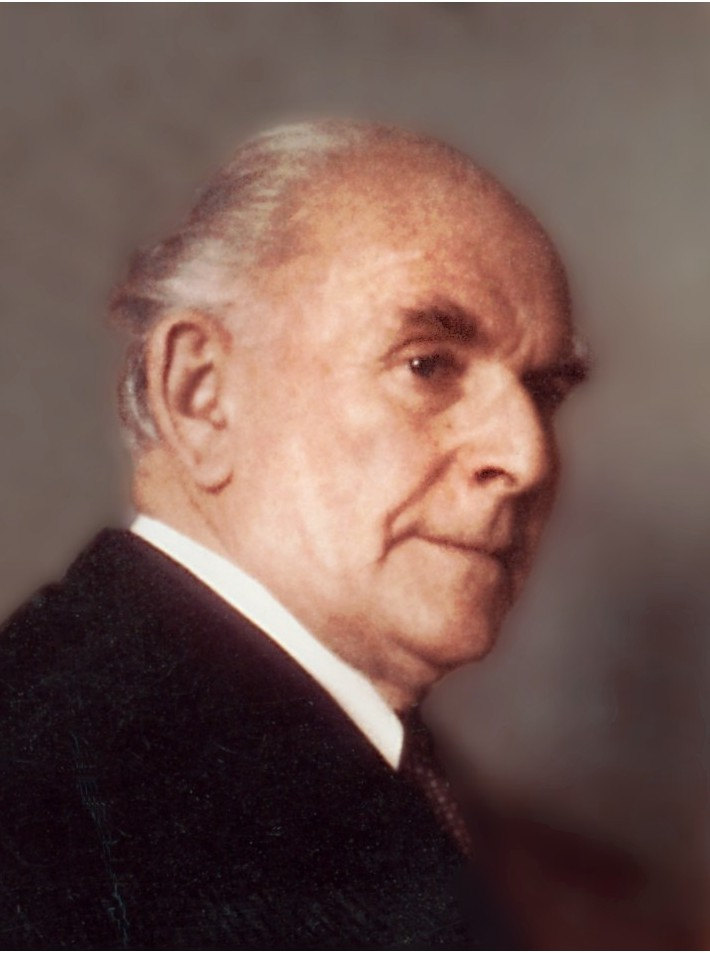
Count Karl von und zu Trauttmansdorff

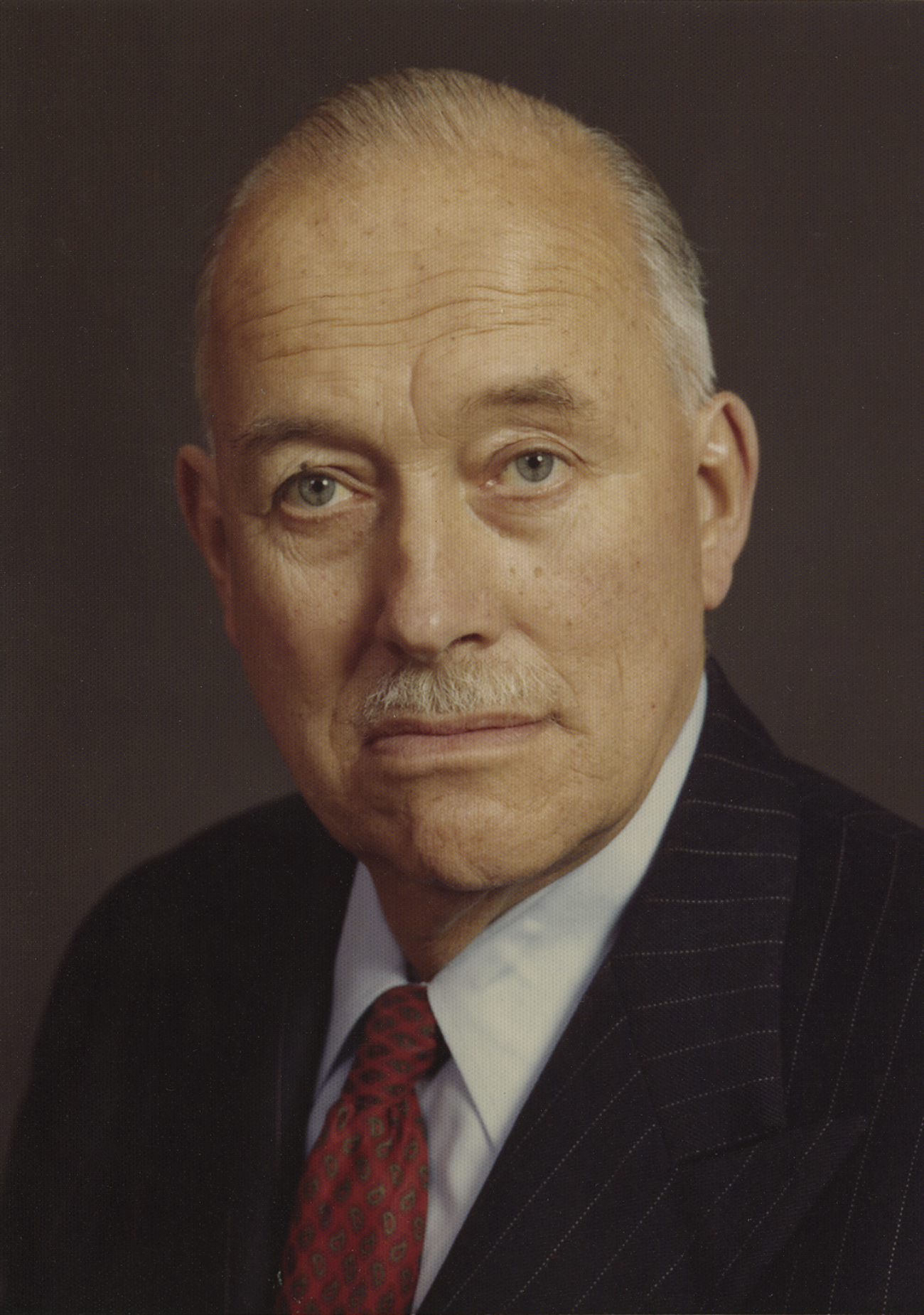
Prince Emanuel von und zu Liechtenstein

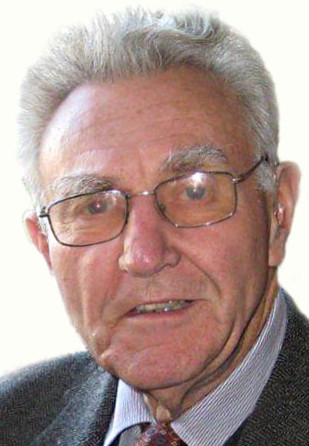
Count Leonhard von Wolkenstein-Rodenegg

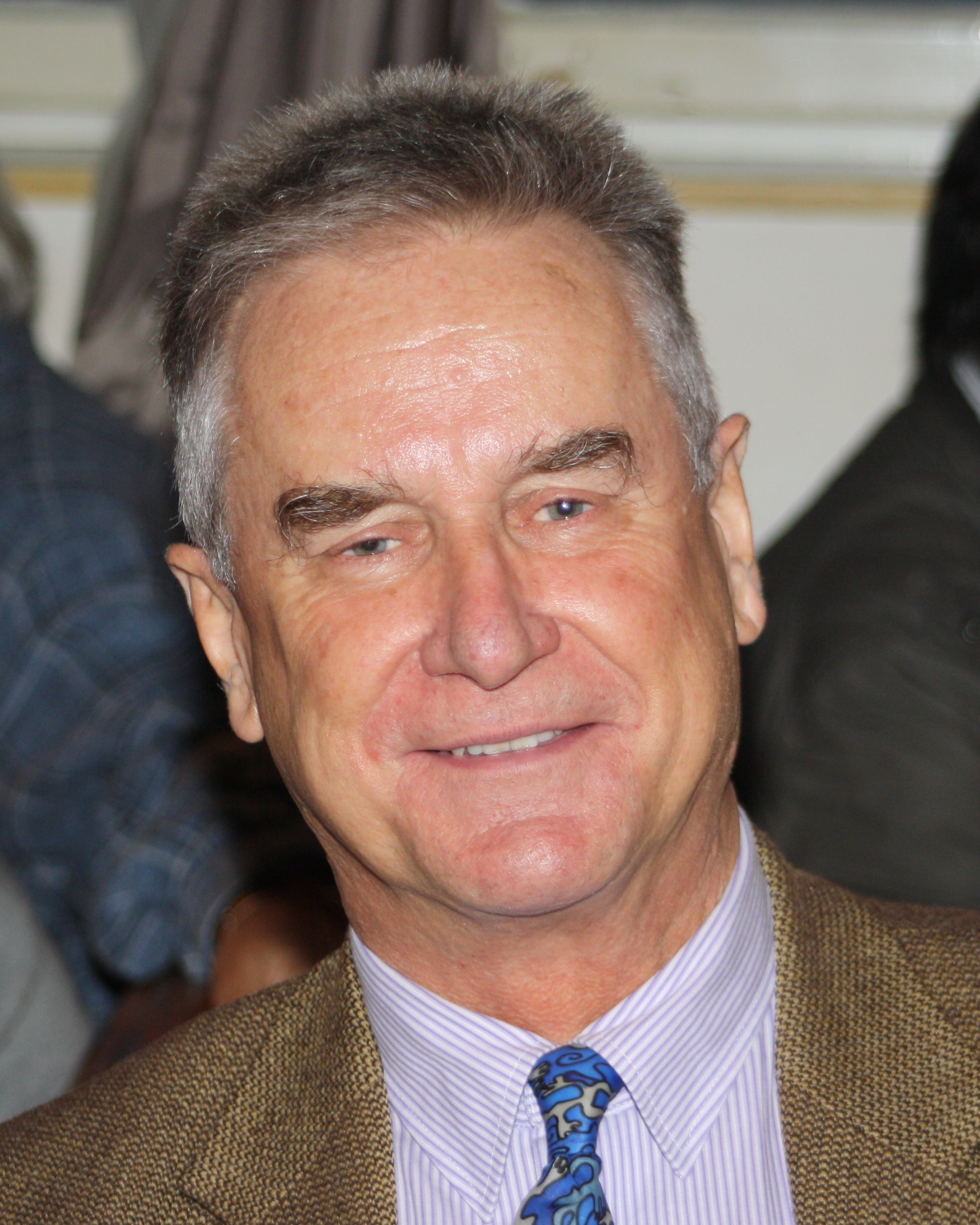
Prince Gundakar von und zu Liechtenstein
- 1926–1937 Count Bernhard zu Stolberg-Stolberg
- 1937–1959 Prince Johannes von und zu Liechtenstein
- 1959–1970 Count Karl von und zu Trauttmansdorff-Weinsberg
- 1979–1987 Prince Emanuel von und zu Liechtenstein
- 1987–1999 Count Leonhard von Wolkenstein zu Rodenegg
- Since 1999 Prince Gundakar von und zu Liechtenstein

== Insignia of the order ==
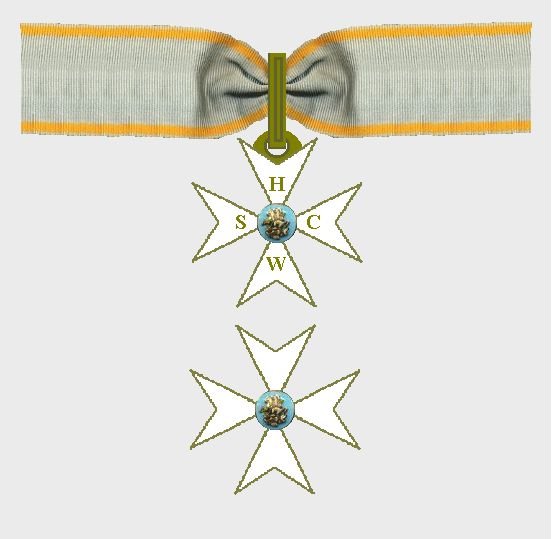
Commander's Cross

The order has three grades:

- Grand Cross
- Commander
- Knight

The order's badge is a white-enamelled, eight-pointed cross pattée (Maltese cross) with golden flames in the corners and topped with the imperial crown of the Holy Roman Empire. On the four arms of the cross the initial letters (H, C, W, S) of the four emperors from the House of Luxembourg are located (Henry VII, Charles IV, Wenceslas I and Sigismund). In the middle of the cross there is a light blue medallion, depicting in gold Saint George on horseback, slaying the dragon. The light blue medallion on the back of the cross blazons in gold the order's motto: Illustrioribus et Nobilitati (or abbreviated Illustr et Nob). Wearing the insignia, it is affixed to a golden-edged light blue cordon. Officers of the Austrian Army are permitted to wear the order's insignia on their uniforms, as per decree of the Austrian Ministry of Defence. The order's insignia and its Latin motto are officially registered as trademarks in Austria (Reg. Nos. 246973 and 247000), Germany (Reg. Nos. 302008053367 and 302008053400) and the European Union (CTMs 011307311 and 011307287).

In Jörg Nimmerguts catalogue another model of Knight cross can be found with flames on the arms of the cross, an Imperial Crown and the letters "P-P-D-E". In the medallion is an angel with a child in the hand.

== See also ==
- Order of St Philip of the Lion of Limburg
- Order of Saint George (House of Habsburg)

== Literature ==
- Jörg Nimmergut, Deutschland-Katalog 2001 Orden und Ehrenzeichen, Nummers 1088 e.v.
- Gustav Adolph Ackermann, Ordensbuch, Sämtlicher in Europa blühender und erloschener Orden und Ehrenzeichen. Annaberg, 1855
- Orders of knighthood, Awards and the Holy See by Peter Bander van Duren and Archbishop H.E. Cardinale (Apostolic Delegate in the United Kingdom), Buckinghamshire 1985.
- Ferdinand Freiherr von Biedenfeld: Geschichte und Verfassung aller geistlichen und weltlichen, erloschenen und blühenden Ritterorden. Bernhard Friedrich Voigt, Weimar 1841, Zweiter Band S. 63–81.
- Ritterorden vom Alten Adel oder der vier Römischen Kaiser – Fundationsbrief. Wilhelmsdorf 1768.
- Maigne, W.: Dictionnaire encyclopédique des ordres de chevalerie civils et militaries créés chez les différents peuples. Paris 1861.
- Kerckhove, J. de: Notice sur l´origine et le rétablissement de l´ordre chapitral d´ancienne noblesse des quatre empereurs. Anvers 1839.
- Kerckhove, J. de: Statuts de l´ordre chapitral d´ancienne noblesse des quatre empereurs. Anvers 1839.
- Procházka, R.: Österreichisches Ordenshandbuch. München 1974.
