= Philipp Ferdinand of Limburg-Stirum =

German nobleman

Philipp Ferdinand von Limburg Stirum (born 1734, died 1794), Count of Limburg, lord of Styrum, was the fourth reigning count from the branch Limburg-Styrum-Styrum. He was also heir of Wilhermsdorf in Franconia and of the sovereign Lordship of Oberstein.

He is known for his very extravagant and fastuous lifestyle, which caused his bankruptcy, and for having been the lover of Princess Tarakanova.

== Life ==
Philipp Ferdinand was born on August 21, 1734, in Schillingsfürst. He was the fifth son of Christian Otto, count of Limburg Stirum and his wife, née Carolina Juliana princess of Hohenlohe-Waldenburg-Schillingsfürst.

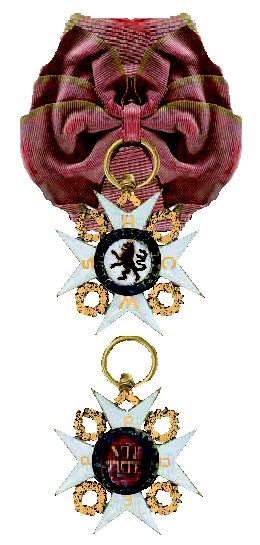
The Order of St Philip of the Lion of Limburg was created by the Limburg Stirum to reward persons of exceptional scientific, artistic or civil virtue.

After the death of his mother in 1758, he inherited the Herrschaft of Wilhermsdorf. Philipp Ferdinand was megalomaniac, and led a fastuous life in his palace of Wilhermsdorf, inspired by the court of Versailles. He had his own court theatre, music chapel and even a corps of hussar. In 1760, after his elder brother's death, he inherited Styrum.

Because of his very extravagant life, he soon had huge debts and was forced to sell Wilhermsdorf in 1769, moving his possessions to Oberstein. Despite selling many of his assets (farms and castles), his debt kept rising. He also gave money to the Jesuits to create a Catholic school and Catholic parish in Protestant Mülheim. The emperor, Joseph II, was trying to control the Church and didn't approve of these actions. When he heard about the enormous debts of the count, he sent a fiscalist to Styrum to take action in order to avoid future problems.

Despite this reprimand, Philipp Ferdinand kept on living a very extravagant life. In order to raise money he created two orders of chivalry (the Order of St Philip of the Lion of Limburg and the Order of the Four Emperors), which he gave to prominent figures, but usually for a fee. He also tried to claim territories, like the Herrschaft of Pinneberg in the County of Holstein, and the immediate lordship of Oberstein; which should have become his possession through heritage. This involved him in huge and expensive trials. He finally recovered in 1773 two thirds of the territory of Oberstein. He also claimed the title of Duke of Schleswig-Holstein, which Joseph II refused to recognize.

In 1766 he was made prince by the French parliament, but in 1789 Joseph II forbade him to wear this title.

In 1770, Philipp Ferdinand was put into prison for not paying his debts. A letter from his brother, Ernst Maria, to the emperor, in which he insisted on all the services the House of Limburg-Stirum had given to the Empire, was enough to have Philipp Ferdinand released.

In 1772, Princess Tarakanova, who had left Paris after a scandal, settled in Frankfurt am Main. The court marshal of Philipp Ferdinand, count de Rochefort-Valcourt, told him about this woman who pretended to be the daughter of Elizabeth I of Russia, and granddaughter of Peter the Great. Philipp Ferdinand invited her to stay with him and immediately fell in love with her. She promised to marry him if he could guarantee surety for all her debts which she had accumulated in Paris. He accepted everything his mistress asked. But in 1774, she left Oberstein for Venice. Despite his own difficult financial situation, Philipp Ferdinand gave her a great sum of money for her trip and also gave her the right to wear the title princess of Limburg Stirum after his death.

Philipp Ferdinand had two natural children (a son and a daughter) from his relationship with Marie Therese Satori. These children were illegitimate and couldn't inherit his rights and possessions.

He died on September 10, 1794, in Bartenstein (=Schrozberg). His brother Ernst Maria inherited Oberstein and Styrum. Ernst Maria lost Oberstein soon thereafter when invaded by the French troops.

== Sources ==
- De takken Gemen en Styrum van het geslacht van Limburg Stirum; Dr. A.J. Bonke; Stichting van Limburg Stirum; 's-Gravenhage, 2007
- Iconografie van het Geslacht van Limburg Stirum; C.J. Graaf van Limburg Stirum; Walburg Instituut, Amsterdam, 1994
- A. Giraud, M. Huberty, F. et B. Magdelaine, "L'Allemagne Dynastique, Tome VII"
