= Order of St Philip of the Lion of Limburg =

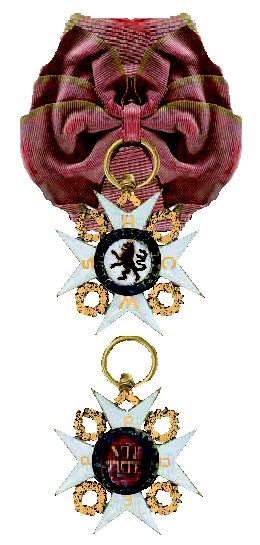
- Insignia of the order

Awarded by House of Limburg-Stirum
- Type: Order
- Established: 1700
- Motto: BENEFICENCIÆ ET VIRTUTI; BENE MERENTIBUS
- Grades: Grand Cross; Commander; Knight; Gold Medal; Silver Medal
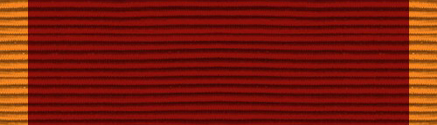
- Ribbon of the order

The Order of St Philip of the Lion of Limburg (German: "Orden Sankt Phillipps zum Löwen"), is an order of knighthood established in 1700 by the Counts of Limburg-Stirum, sovereign rulers of the counties of the same name in Westphalia. With this order were rewarded persons of exceptional scientific, artistic or civil virtue.

The Order had Grand Crosses, Commanders and Knights.

The jewel of the Order was an eight-pointed Maltese cross with gold balls on the points and four laurel wreaths in the arms of the cross. On the arms are written the letters "H-S-C-W" an "P-D-E-P". On the cross is a medallion with a representation of a man.

In 1806 the Counts of Limburg-Stirum were mediatized and lost the sovereignty on their counties. However the Order was still expanded in 1838 with gold and silver medals.

== See also ==
- Order of the Four Emperors

== Literature ==
- Jörg Nimmergut, Deutschland-Katalog 2001 Orden und Ehrenzeichen, Nummers 1090 e.v.
- Gustav Adolph Ackermann, " Ordensbuch, Sämtlicher in Europa blühender und erloschener Orden und Ehrenzeichen ". Annaberg, 1855
