= Knyphausen =

Knyphausen may refer to:

- Edzard zu Innhausen und Knyphausen (1827–1908), Frisian and Prussian landowner and politician
- Dodo zu Innhausen und Knyphausen (1583–1636), Field Marshal of Sweden
- Dodo von Knyphausen (1641–1698), official of Brandenburg-Prussia
- Wilhelm von Knyphausen (1716–1800), Hessian general in the American Revolutionary War
