= Invasion of the Veluwe (1629) =

Failed invasion of the Dutch Republic

- Part of the Eighty Years' War and the Anglo-Spanish War (1625–1630)
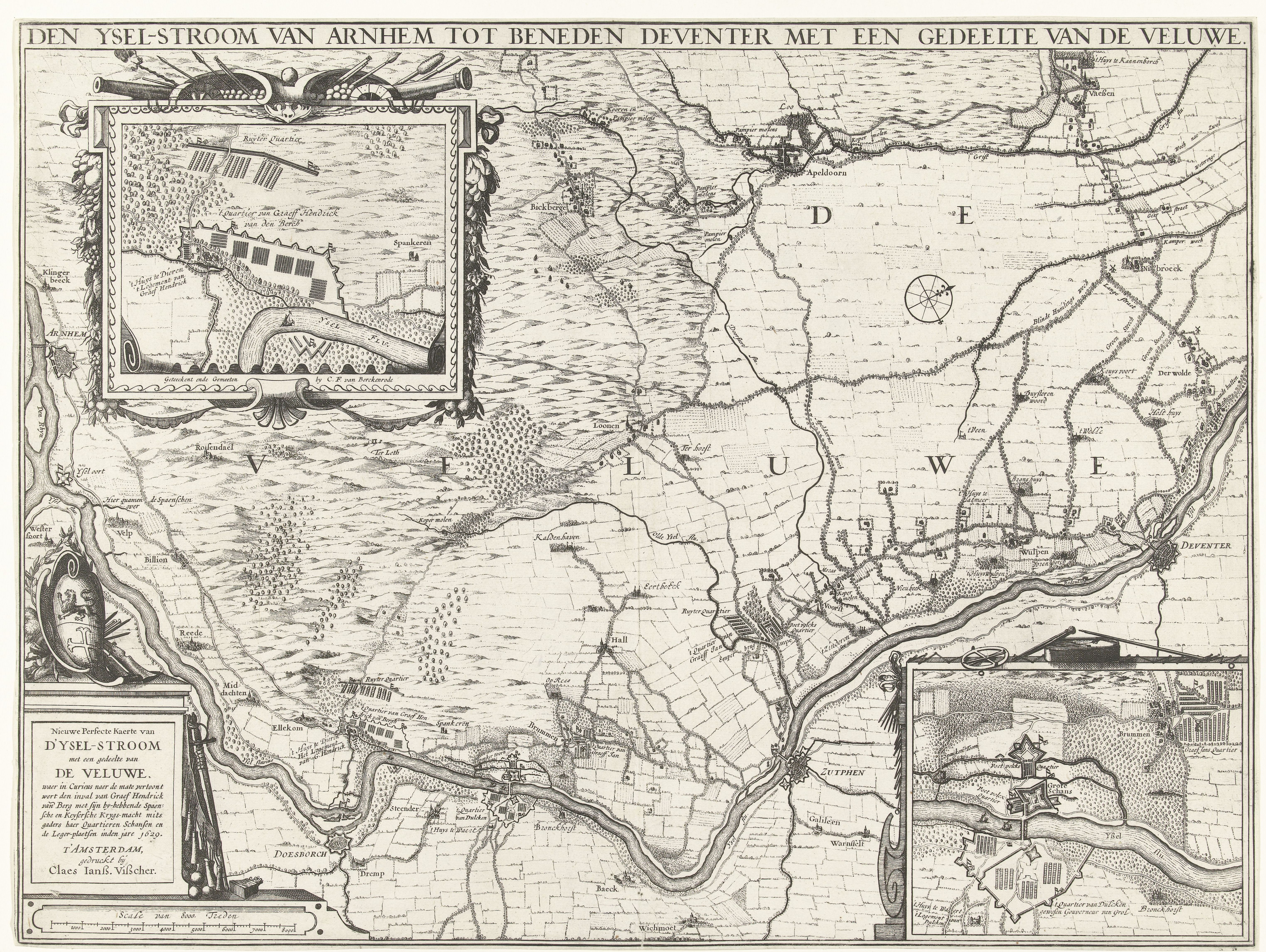
Date	July – August, 1629
Location	Veluwe, County of Zutphen
Result	Dutch victory

Belligerents
(Spanish Empire) Kingdom of Spain; Holy Roman Empire	Dutch Republic; England

Commanders and leaders
(Spanish Empire) Hendrik van den Bergh (Spanish Empire) Lucas Cairo (Spanish Empire) Prince of Chimay (Holy Roman Empire) (Spanish Empire) Jan van Nassau-Siegen (Holy Roman Empire) (Spanish Empire) Ernesto Montecuccoli	(Dutch Republic) Frederick Henry (Dutch Republic) Ernest Casimir von Nassau-Dietz (Dutch Republic) Herman Otto I

Strength
23,000–24,000	Unknown

The Invasion of the Veluwe was an invasion of the Dutch Republic in 1629 carried out by Imperial and Spanish troops in order to divert the States army from the Siege of 's-Hertogenbosch. The invasion was led by Count Hendrik van den Bergh with an army that likely consisted of around 20.000 men. Although the city of Amersfoort in the province of Utrecht was captured, the Dutch did not give up their siege of 's-Hertogenbosch, which meant that the main objective of the invading troops was not achieved. And after the Dutch troops captured Wesel, the Imperial-Spanish forces were forced to retreat.

== Prelude ==
In April 1629, Frederick Henry, the then Prince of Orange began his siege of 's-Hertogenbosch after the Spanish tried to start a blockade of the Dutch Republic in order to weaken its position. This blockade caused severe economic damages in the Dutch Republic. Frederick's siege was made possible by Piet Pieterszoon Hein's victory at the battle in the bay of Matanzas in which Piet Hein captured an enormous Spanish treasure fleet which sailed from the America's, the estimated booty that Piet Hein captured was equivalent to half a billion modern day Euro's.

Each Spanish attempt at trying to arrive at Den Bosch in order to relieve the city had failed. So instead of doing it another, Hendrik van den Bergh decided to invade the Dutch Republic, this campaign was not launched with the intent of the destruction of the Republic, but rather an attempt to cause panic among the Dutch population that would eventually force Frederick Henry to break the siege of 's-Hertogenbosch. In July the Spanish troops marched to Veghel through Boxtel, which meant that a siege of Grave was possible, Frederick Henry however saw no threat of the city being besieged since the garrison of the defended town was raised to 4.000 men.

== Invasion ==
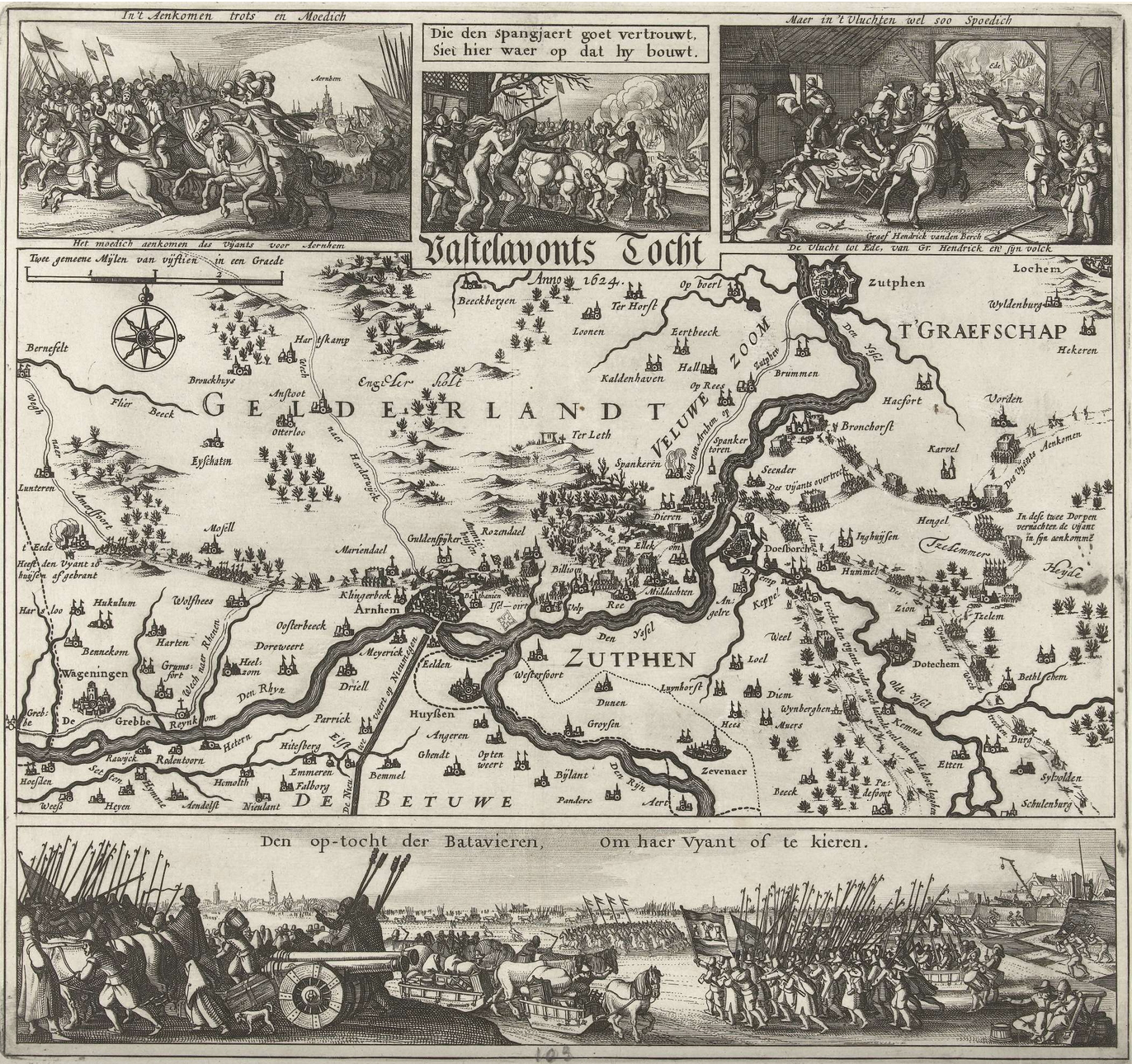
Map of the Invasion of the Veluwe, by Claes Jansz. Visscher

The campaign started with a Spanish force under Lucas Cairo crossing the IJssel near the fort of IJsseloord the night of 22 to 23 July. Two days later, a Dutch force led by Hermann Otto I of Limburg-Styrum tried to dislodge the Spanish from their entrenchments, but was defeated. On 27 July Hendrik van den Bergh arrived with his army at Westervoort, but left after a few days. On 31 July he occupied Dieren and began building a bridge across the Ijssel river at Brummen. In order to secure supplies from Wesel. Not much progress was made within the next week, which allowed Frederick Henry to take action against the invasion. He sent Ernest Casimir towards Arnhem with fifty infantry companies and eight cavalry companies in order to prevent the Imperial-Spanish forces to make further advances, those troops did see how the Spanish cavalry was presented through the city walls and saw that they sacked the town of Velp. To further prevent this, the States of Holland decided to raise an army that consisted of 5.000 Burghers and Groningen and Frisia ordered the recruitment of 3.000 waardgelders. The Imperial-Spanish armies faced a difficult logistical problem during the invasion, due to the main supply depot of both armies being Wesel, but the bakeries of the city were not able to reach the standard amount of bread to supply the army with enough food. And because of that the troops had to settle locally, but because of their bad reputations, the local inhabitants fled to other parts of the country.

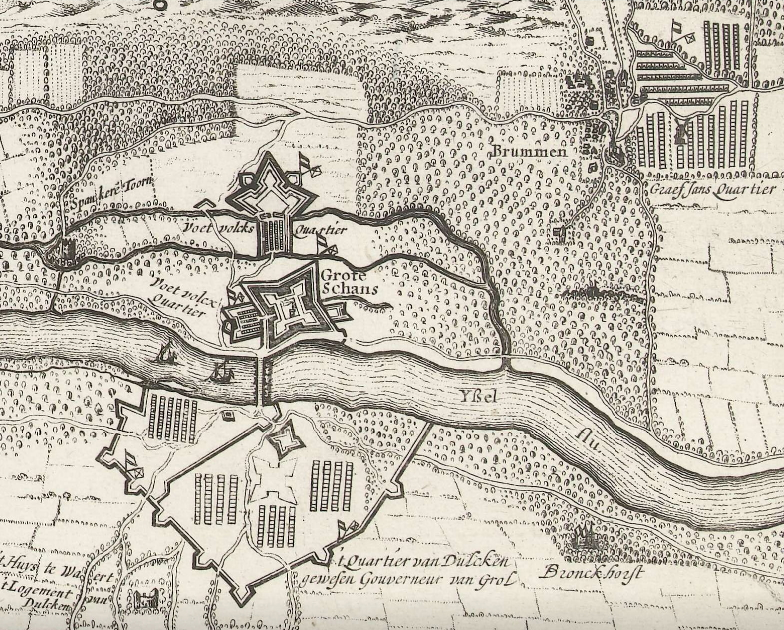
The Brummense schans by Nicolaes van Geelkercken

Even with a large army invading mainland Dutch territory, Frederick Henry still laid his focus on the siege of 's-Hertogenbosch and kept a part of his army there because the siege was too costly to give up. And in his opinion, the invaders were not in such a state to deliver huge amounts of damages to the surrounding area's. On 10 August, Ernesto Montecuccoli joined the Spanish army under Hendrik van den Bergh, the plan was that Ernesto would reach the Zuiderzee through Amersfoort and Harderwijk which would consequently threaten Utrecht and Naarden. And under the command of Jacinto de Velasco y Henin, the Count of Salazar, the Imperial-Spanish armies would attack Hattem which would open Frisia to an invasion. And Hendrik van den Bergh would protect Brummen with his army, Count Jan VIII of Nassau-Siegen arrived at Brummen a few days later.

=== Attack on Hattem ===
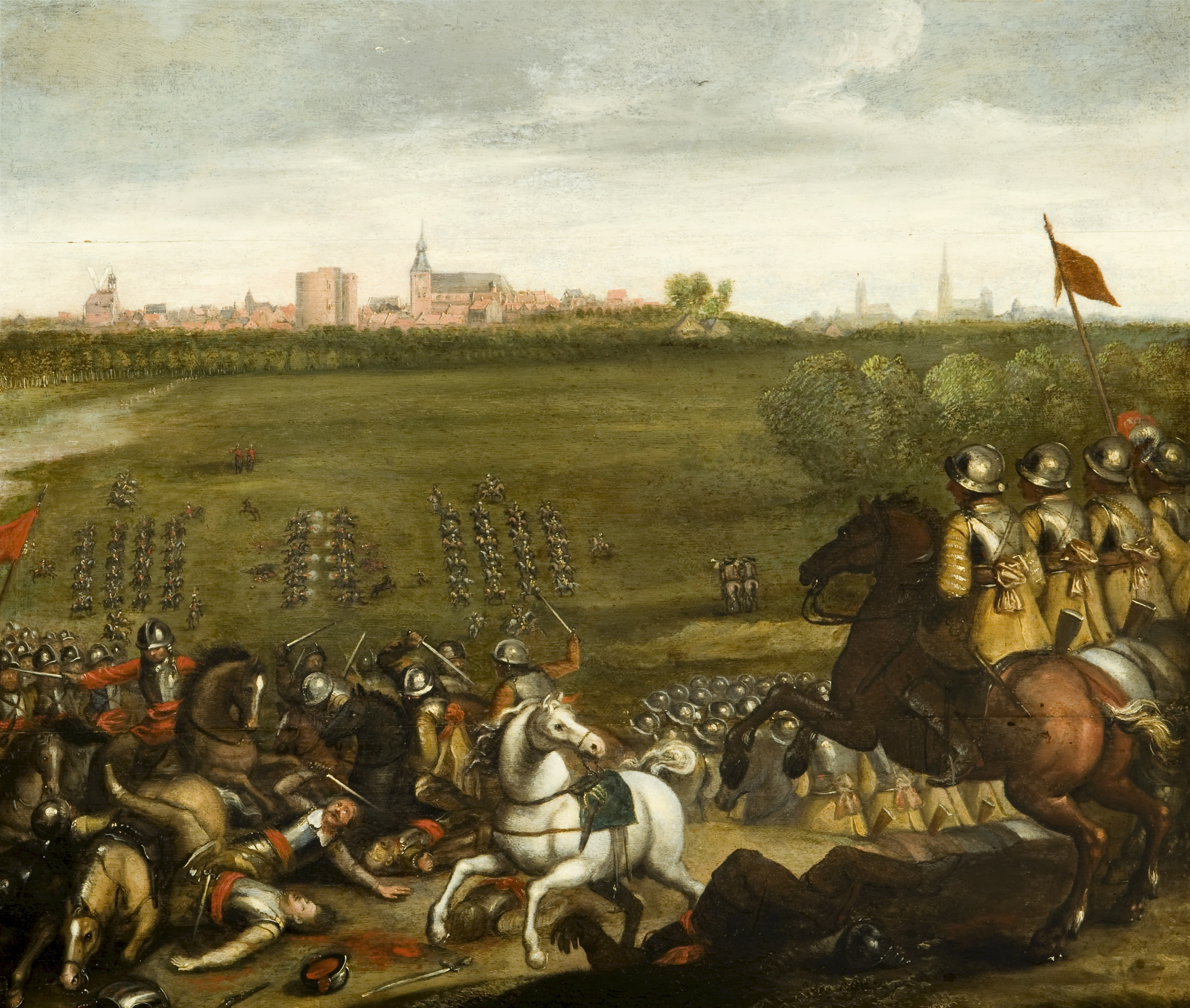
The attack on Hattem, by Peter Snayers

The Count of Salazar arrived before Hattem in August and demanded the surrender of the city. The situation in the city was quite chaotic. The inhabitants did not believe that the city of Hattem could put up a proper fight against the Imperial-Spanish forces due to the city being undermanned and the poor state of defences. The city of Hattem did receive help from Zwolle with a company of around 300 men and 140 musketeers and food supplies. Meanwhile, the city of Hattme took measures to defend the city, the city was cleaned up, and the men of the city planted green around the city walls for extra defence in order to prevent a possible storming of the city. Although the city was better prepared than before, the city endured no major attack or storming, although the field deputies in Arnhem wrote that the city endured and repelled 3 major assaults. The Imperial-Spanish attack on Hattem failed, and the armies matched towards Oldebroek to plunder the city and threaten Elburg in the process.

=== Capture of Amersfoort ===
On 14 August, Ernesto Montecuccoli captured Amersfoort without resistance. This triggered widespread panic among the population of Utrecht, where citizens lacked confidence that their garrison of 3.000 men could withstand an assault. Most of the local populations fled elsewhere to either Holland or the Betuwe, the capture also caused great panic among the Dutch population. Frederick Henry however did not see a threat, he sent Colonel Otto van Gendt with an army of 2.500 men towards Wesel which was the main supply base of the Imperial-Spanish armies. And on 19 August, he carried out a surprise attack on the city in which the garrison that consisted of sixteen companies barely put up a fight. The capture of Wesel meant that the Imperial-Spanish troops had to cancel their invasion, and retreat.

== Aftermath ==
The Imperial-Spanish forces left the Veluwe after the capture of Wesel. The invasion had proven that the Dutch Republic was indeed capable of having sufficient resources and repel a foreign invasion on its own. Just before the invading troops retreated from the Veluwe, Frederick Henry of Orange captured Den Bosch, bringing his costly siege to an end. Which meant that the main objective of the Imperial-Spanish forces had failed, the invasion had also proven that the Dutch Republic could handle such a costly siege and endure an invasion at the same time.
