= Dodo Knyphausen =

Dodo Knyphausen is the name of:

- Dodo zu Innhausen und Knyphausen (1583–1636), Field Marshal of Sweden
- Dodo von Knyphausen (1641–1698), official of Brandenburg-Prussia
