= Battle of IJsseloord =

- Part of the Eighty Years' War
Date	24 July, 1629
Location	near IJsseloord, Dutch Republic
Result	Spanish victory

Belligerents
Dutch Republic	Spain

Commanders and leaders
(Dutch Republic) Hermann Otto I of Limburg-Styrum	(Spanish Empire) Lucas Cairo

Strength
4,000 infantry 8–10 cavalry companies 4–6 cannons	2,000 infantry 5 cavalry companies

Casualties and losses
200–600, or 2,000	Unknown

The Battle of IJsseloord took place on 24 July 1629 near Arnhem during the Spanish Invasion of Veluwe, aiming at diverting the Dutch States Army from its Siege of 's-Hertogenbosch. Count Hendrik van den Bergh instructed Lucas Cairo, governor of Lingen, to spearhead the invasion together with a detachment led by Matthijs Dulken, and secure a crossing over the IJssel River to enter the Veluwe. On 22 July the Spanish vanguard, comprising 300 Croat cavalrymen and 800 musketeers, crossed the IJssel near Westervoort, close to the point where it splits from the Nederrijn. The Spanish foiled feeble attempts by the garrison and militia of Arnhem to repel them and entrenched themselves while 1,800 additional troops crossed the river. Next day, a substantial Dutch force under Hermann Otto I of Limburg-Styrum attacked the Spanish position, but was rebuffed with heavy losses as a result of poor coordination between infantry and cavalry.

== Preliminary movements ==
In early 1629, the Dutch States-General decided to besiege the town of 's-Hertogenbosch, in Brabant, to free the provinces of Holland, Utrecht and Gelderland from Spanish raids. On 1 May, the Dutch field army, numbering around 28,000 to 29,000 men under Prince Frederick Henry of Orange, invested 's-Hertogenbosch. The Spanish Army of Flanders under Count Hendrik van den Bergh mobilized to relief the town and by 24 June was encamped at Hilvarenbeek. At the same time, an Imperial army led by Ernesto Montecuccoli was preparing at the Duchy of Berg and the County of Mark to invade the Dutch Republic from the east.

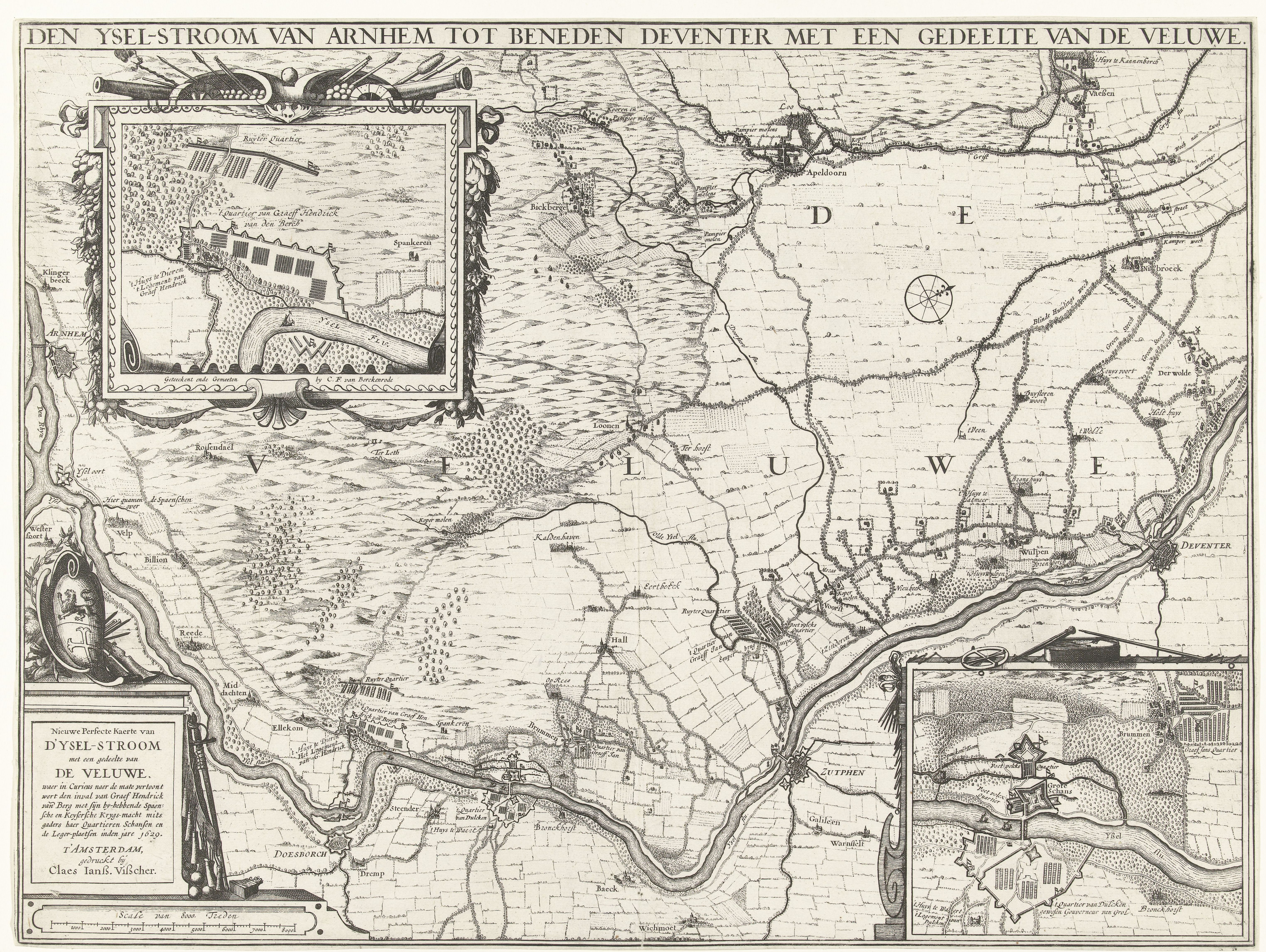
Map of the IJssel spanning from Arnhem to Deventer with the towns, forts and Spanish encampments in August 1629, by Claes Jansz. Visscher.

Van den Bergh soon realized that his army was not strong enough to relief 's-Hertogenbosch, and therefore decided to join forces with the Imperialists to make a diversion to oblige the Dutch to lift the siege. On 17 July, the Spanish Army left its camp and advanced upon Grave. The 21st, the Army crossed the Meuse near Mook and Boxmeer over two pontoon bridges. Frederick Henry sent detachments to bolster the garrisons along the Lower Meuse and the Waal, and dispatched one os his lieutenants, Count Hermann Otto I of Limburg-Styrum, to protect the Betuwe with 9,000 infantry and 17 cavalry companies.

Van den Bergh left 6,000 men under the Prince of Brabançon near Gennep to make fake preparations for a crossing of the Waal and therefore mislead Limburg-Styrum, while he crossed the Rhine at Wesel with 13,000 to 14,000 men and 28 cannons. Meanwhile, a vanguard force under Lucas Cairo, governor of Lingen, supported by a detachment under Matthijs Dulken, former governor of Groenlo, was ready to cross the IJssel and start the invasion.

== River crossing ==
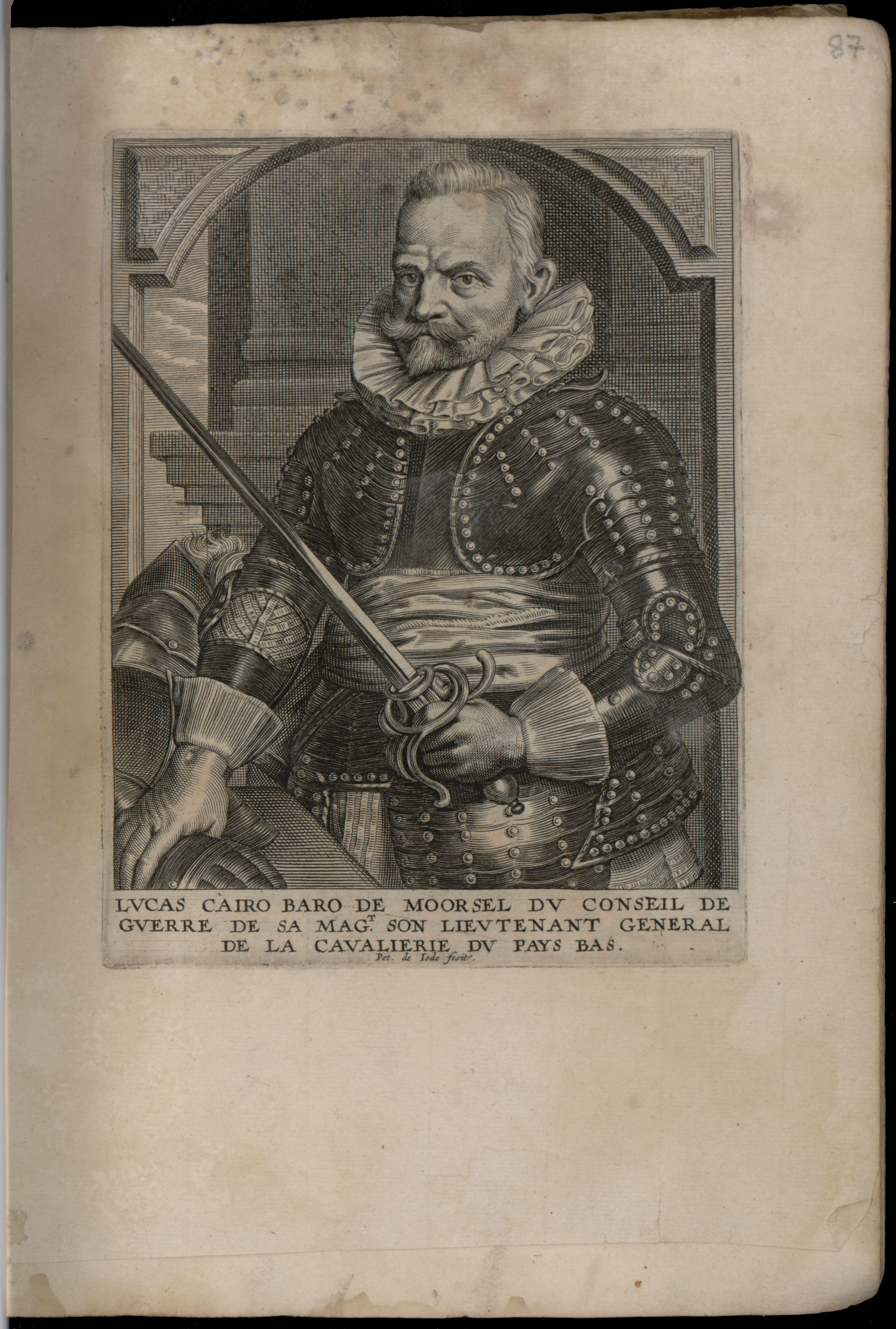
Engraved portrait of Lucas Cairo by Pieter de Jode II, 1652.

Following Van den Bergh's orders, the Spanish force advanced from Wesel on 20 July. Their movement did not went unnoticed, and the governor of the Dutch fort of Schenkenschans sent a warning to the mayor of Arnhem, Dirk Dibbits, who garrisoned the fort of IJsseloord with a company of schutterij. The States of Gelderland informed Limburg-Styrum and requested four or five infantry companies to strengthen the defenses. The Count, however, dismissed their fears and sent just two foot companies from Nijmegen to bolster the approaches to Arnhem. Further 400 men were stationed at Doesburg.

The Spanish force came near the fort of IJsseloord the night of 22 to 23 July. On finding it occupied, Cairo moved along the river to Westervoort and the crossing started there. 300 Croat riders forded the IJssel and hammered logs into the ground to secure ropes which were used to transport 800 musketeers in boats to the opposite bank. They immediately started to fortify themselves behind an earthwork with a stockade. Two Dutch warships loaded with ammunitions and supplies were captured. The Arnhem schutterij from IJsseloord, with two cannons, attempted to dislodge the Spanish while they were building their entrenchment, but were easily repelled. A second attempt carried out by a Dutch foot company under Captain Dables and a cavalry one led by rittmeister Schwartzenburg was likewise foiled.

== Battle ==
Realizing he had been deceived, Limburg-Styrum moved from Nijmegen with all the troops available to check the Spanish incursion and ordered Colonel Varick to gather as many troops as he could at Grave and follow him. In the early hours of 24 July, the Count left Arhnem with 19 infantry companies, 10 or 11 cavalry companies and 4 or 6 cannons. In the meantime, further 1,800 Spanish troops had crossed the IJssel and reinforced Cairo.

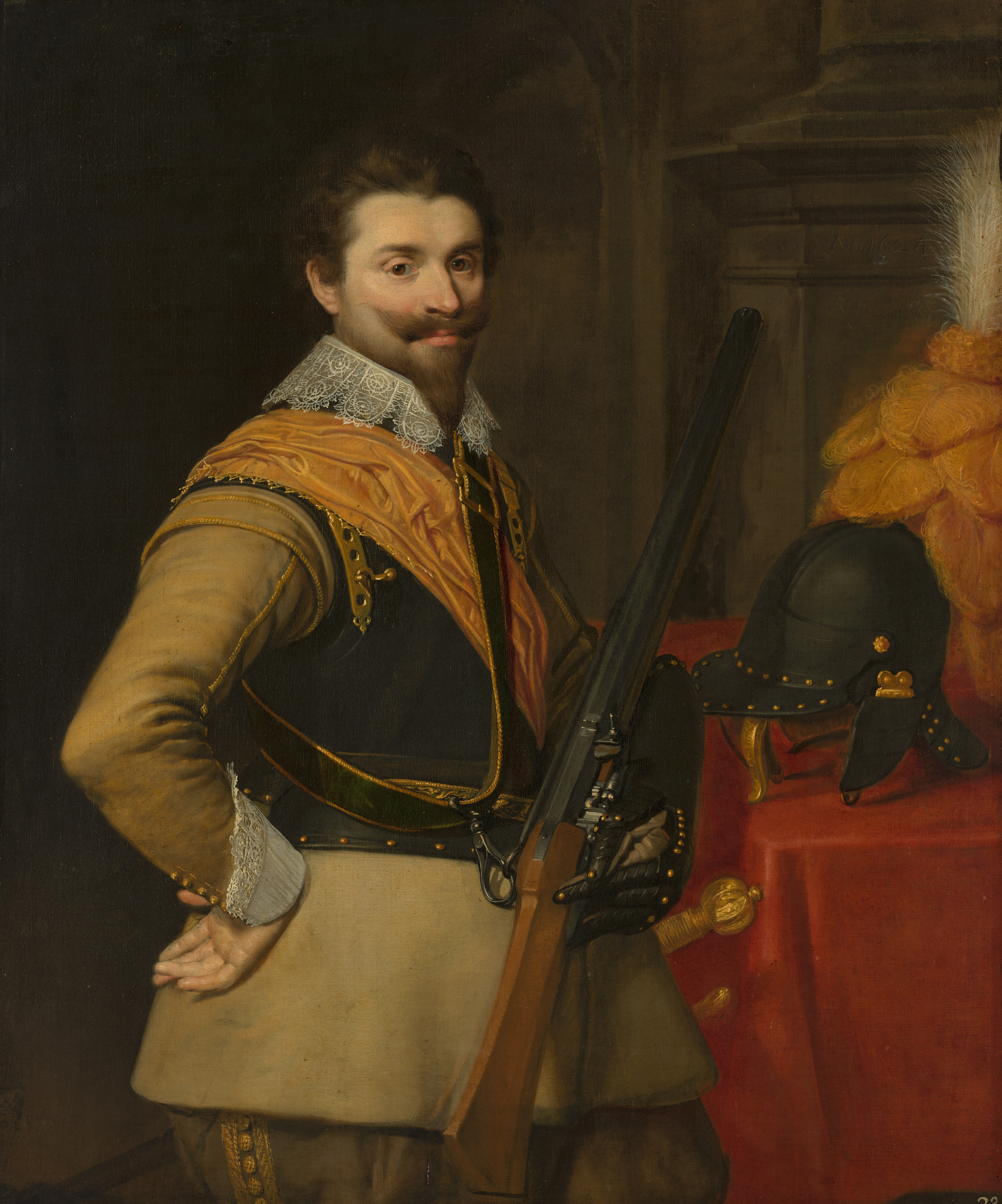
Portrait of Limburg-Styrum by Jan van Ravesteyn, 1624.

Arriving near the Spanish position, Limburg-Styrum devised a battle plan to assault the entrenchment and drove the Spanish out of it. His cavalry, under Captain Van Bassum, would charge the Spanish horse, deployed in five squadrons on the left, outside the entrenchment, while the Count himself would launch a frontal attack with the infantry upon the fort. The Dutch cavalry opened the action by advancing over the Spanish, but became disorganized as they crossed a narrow lock over a stream. The Spanish cavalry seized the opportunity and launched a charge that defeated the Dutch horse and drove them behind the stream with multiple casualties, including a mortally wounded Van Bassum, taking two flags in the process.

While the Dutch and Spanish cavalries were fighting, Limburg-Styrum kept his infantry stationary under a heavy artillery and musketry fire from the entrenchment. The Count attacked after his cavalry had been defeated, with his troops diminished and demoralized. The Spanish repelled successive assaults and inflicted many casualties. Colonel Varick reached the battlefield past midday, bringing 13 additional foot companies. Having refreshed and reorganized the troops, Limburg-Sturym launched a new attack, but this was rebuffed as well. A rainstorm yielded most of the firearms useless, after which the Dutch started to retreat. Cairo sent the Croats in persecution, further elevating their casualties.

== Aftermath ==
The Dutch lost between 200 and 600 men, or as many as 2,000. A week later, Van den Bergh arrived with 15,000 to 16,000 Spanish and 8,000 Imperialist troops. They crossed the IJssel over a pontoon bridge at Brummen and encamped themselves at Dieren. Limburg-Styrum's defeat and the arrival of the Catholic army raised alarms on the Dutch side, but the States General and the Prince of Orange agreed on keeping the siege of 's-Hertogenbosch. While Van den Bergh's troops were stalled due to logistical difficulties, the Prince sent a sizeable force under Ernst Casimir of Nassau-Dietz to reinforce the towns along the IJssel. Nevertheless, the invasion would last until October, when the last Spanish troops abandoned the Veluwe after the fall of 's-Hertogenbosch.

== Bibliography ==
- Beausobre, Isaac de (1733). Mémoires de Frederic Henri de Nassau Prince d'Orange (in French). Pierre Humbert.
- Bordes, Jan Philipp (1856). De verdediging van Nederland in 1629 (in Dutch). J. G. Broese.
- De la Iglesia, Julián (1629). Relacion verdadera de la feliz entrada del Exercito Catolico en la Velua, Pays de Holandeses, y destroço que hizo en la gente enemiga, con muerte de mas de dos mil hombres della, intentanto divertirla del sitio de Volduque. Sucesos del año 1629 (in Spanish). Vol. MSS/2361. Biblioteca Nacional de España. pp. 112–113.
- Nimwegen, Olaf van (2010). The Dutch Army and the Military Revolutions, 1588-1688. Boydell & Brewer. ISBN 9781843835752.
