= Battle of Wiesloch =

Battle of Wiesloch may refer to:

- Battle of Mingolsheim, fought on April 27, 1622, near the German town of Wiesloch, part of the Thirty Years' War
- Battle of Wiesloch (1632), fought on August 16, 1632, part of the Thirty Years' War
- Battle of Wiesloch (1799), fought on December 3, 1799, part of the War of the Second Coalition
