= Otto of Limburg =

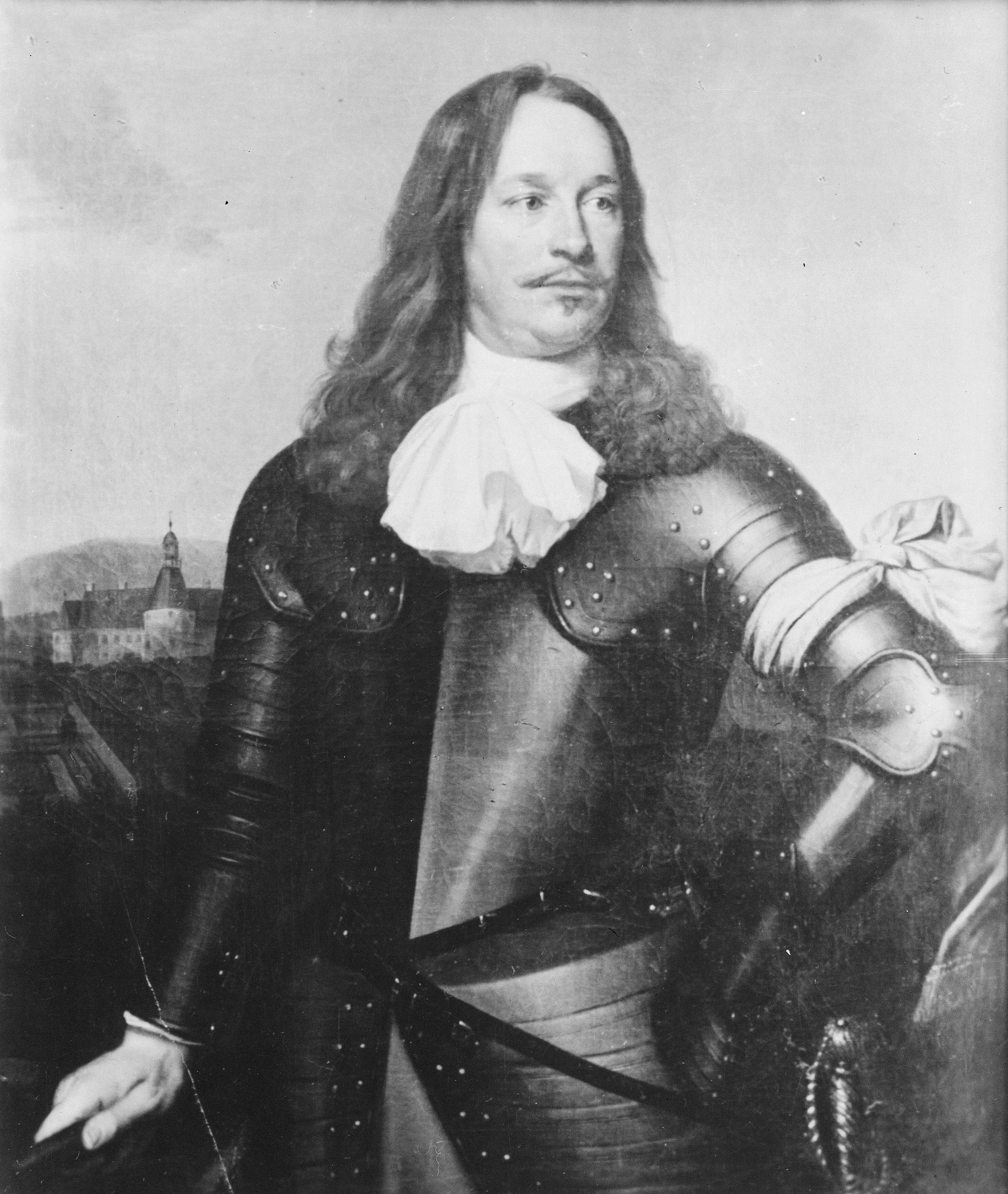
Otto of Limburg-Styrum by Lucas van de Kaey

Otto of Limburg-Styrum, (born 1620, died 27 Aug 1679) count of Limburg and Bronckhorst, was the son of Hermann Otto I of Limburg-Styrum.

Otto, count of Limburg and Bronckhorst, lord of Styrum, Wisch, Borculo and Gemen, hereditary estate lord of the duchy of Guelders and the county of Zutphen, was an officer in the service of the Margraviate of Brandenburg, the Kingdom of Sweden and the Dutch States Army. He also held the positions of governor of Groenlo and Nijmegen.

He married in 1643 Elisabeth Charlotte countess von Dohna (born 1625, died 1691)and they had eight children:

- Otto Christoffel, who was killed in 1673;
- Karl, born around 1650:
- Gustav born around 1655:
- Adolf Gelder, born in 1659 and killed in Mastricht in 1676;
- Albrecht Georg of Limburg, count of Limburg and Bronckhorst (born 1660, died 1690);
- Friedrich Wilhelm of Limburg, count of Limburg and Bronckhorst (born 1649, died 1722);
- Amalie Louise of Limburg and Bronckhorst (born 1646, died 1721); and
- Maria Ursula of Limburg and Bronckhorst.
