= Landscape with Grotto and a Rider =

Painting by Joos de Momper

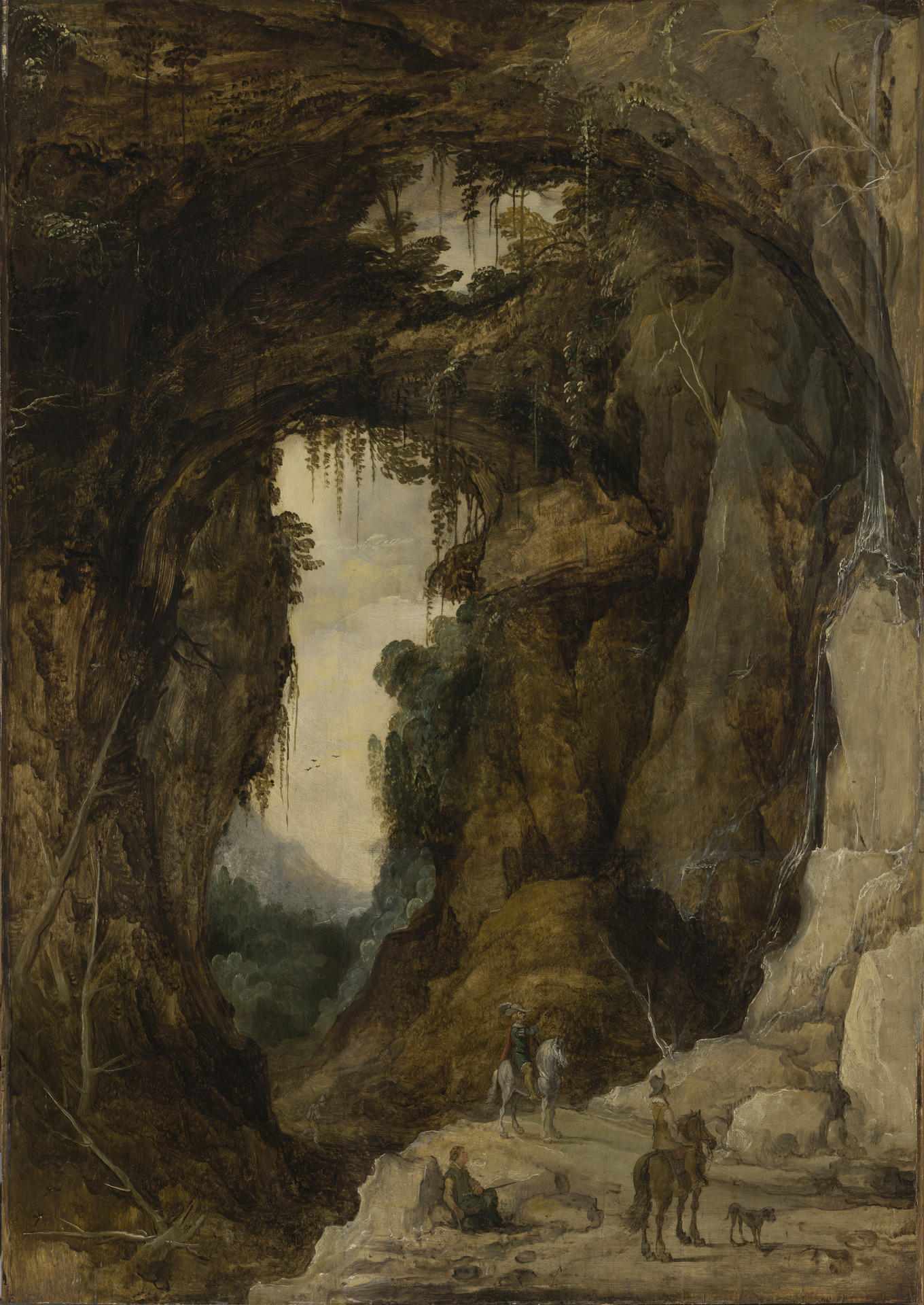
- Artist: Joos de Momper
- Year: c. 1616
- Catalogue: 1965.134
- Medium: Oil on panel
- Dimensions: 99.1 cm × 68.6 cm (39 in × 27 in)
- Location: Yale University Art Gallery, New Haven, Connecticut

Landscape with Grotto and a Rider is an oil-on-panel painting by Flemish painter Joos de Momper. It was completed in the 1610s, possibly in 1616. It is currently housed at the art gallery of Yale University in New Haven, Connecticut.

== Painting ==
The painting depicts a massive grotto. Grottoes were one of the favorite themes of de Momper, and they figure in many of his paintings. Cornelis van Dalem's work influenced de Momper in the choice of this subject.

In the foreground, a man is sitting with his back against a stone, while two horsemen are sitting on their mounts and looking up to the viewer's right. One of them is flanked by a dog. The other is pointing up to the natural features of the grotto. Momper's paintings regularly feature exotic and mountainous topography, and such is the case of Landscape with Grotto and a Rider.

He made use of his memory and imagination to produce foreign vistas with fantastic physical features and glimpses of exotic topography from his studio in Antwerp, Flanders. While paintings by de Momper and the group of Flemish painters following the same trend may seems old-fashioned and are indeed less realistic than the product of the landscape painting of other 17th-century painters, they evince a more experienced, personal and imaginative approach to landscape painting. Although far less frequently than in Brueghel, they may present allegory, and were painted this way so as to please the sophisticated tastes of the wealthy commissioners, who paid a higher price for the "imaginative landscape paintings".

== Provenance ==
The painting was part of the collection of Count Hermann Otto I of Limburg-Styrum, and later came in the possession of Amsterdam-based collector Piet de Boer.
