= William Pape =

German painter (1859 – 1920)

Friedrich Georg William Pape (3 September 1859 – 13 December 1920) was a German painter and illustrator.

== Early life ==
Pape was born on 3 September 1859 in Karlshütte near Rendsburg.

He initially studied philosophy and natural sciences at the University of Berlin before attending the Academy of Arts in Berlin. He received further lessons from Hermann Prell and at the Académie Julian in Paris from Jules-Joseph Lefebvre and Jean-Joseph Benjamin-Constant. He went on painting trips to Italy, Denmark and Russia.

== Career ==
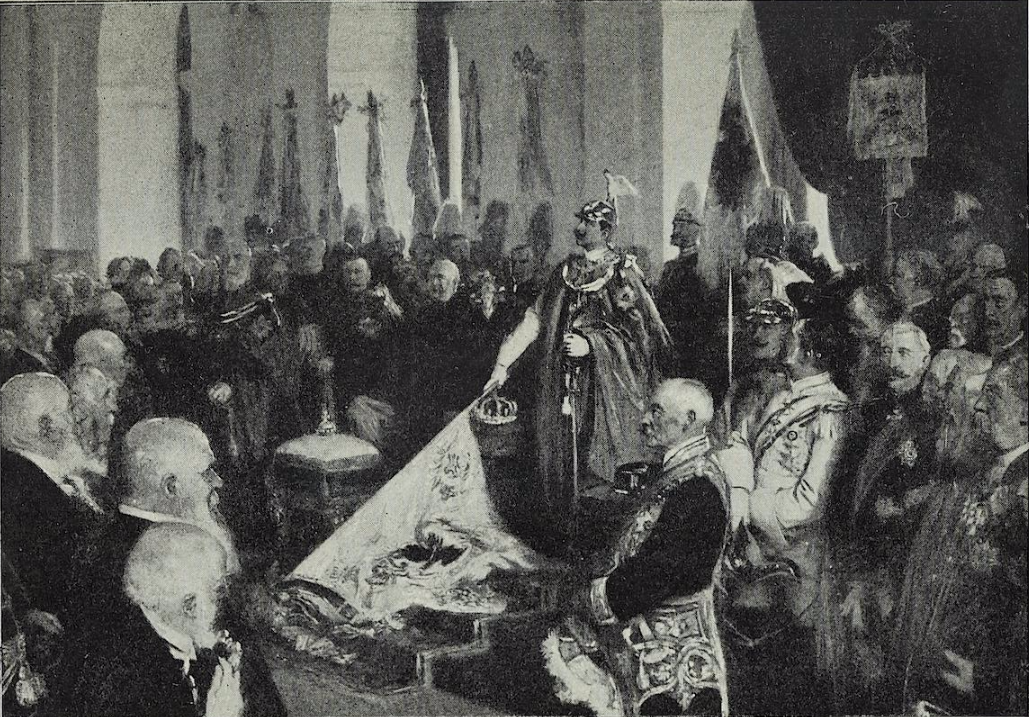
Pape's One Empire, One People, One God, 1896

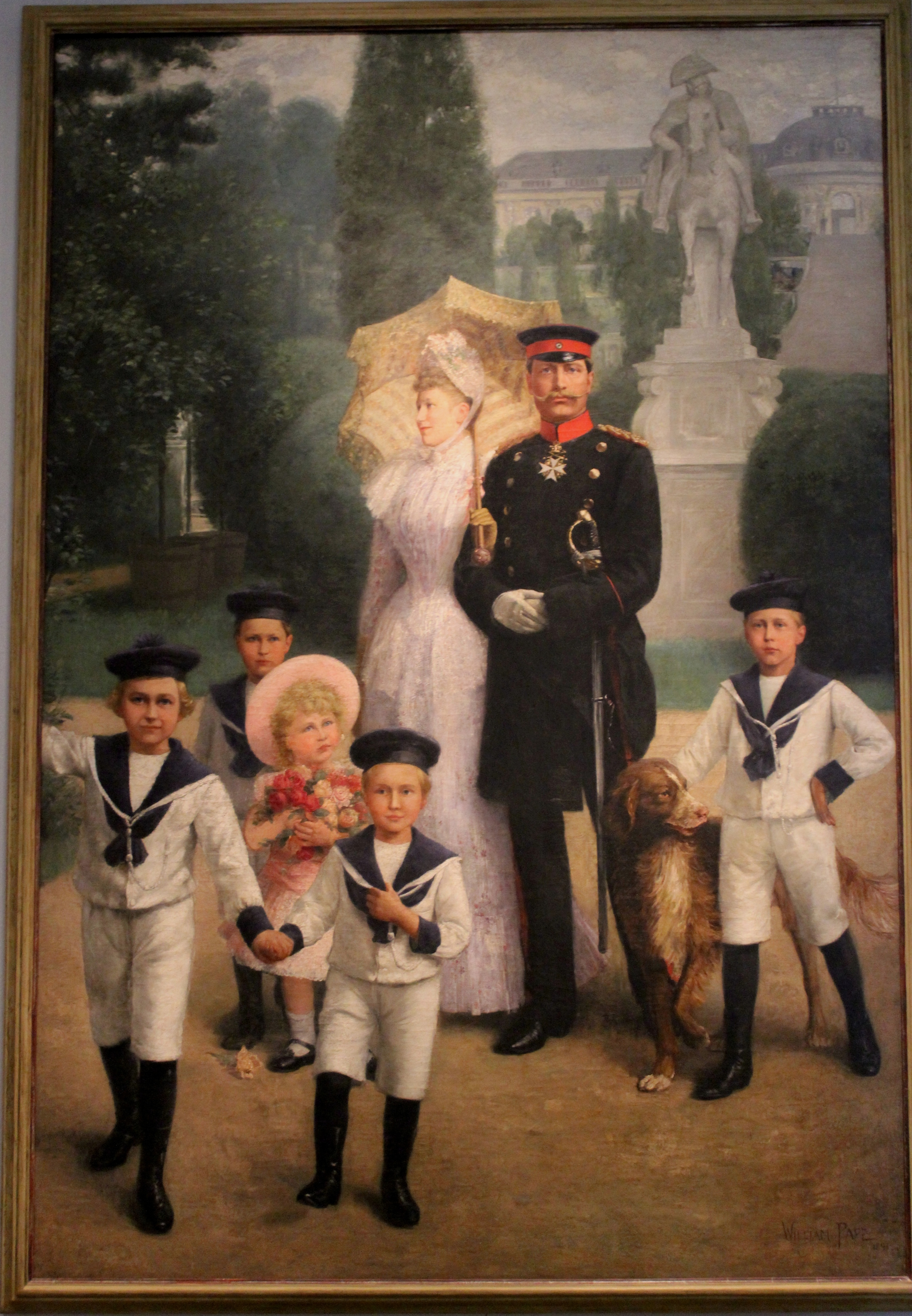
The Royal Family in Park Sanssouci: Wilhelm II, the Empress and the eldest princes, 1891

Pape painted highly detailed large-scale paintings, known as vedutas, in Berlin, but specialized primarily in history painting. His painting, One Empire, One People, One God (German: Ein Reich, Ein Volk, Ein Gott), which depicted the 18 January 1896 celebration marking the 25th anniversary of the founding of the German Empire, attracted the attention of the German court, who purchased the painting, which was owned personally by Kaiser Wilhelm II. The Kaiser also personally owned Paper's 1898 painting, Confirmation of the Crown Prince and Prince Eitel Friedrich (German: Die Konfirmation des Kronprinzen und des Prinzen Eitel Friedrich).

At the time of his death, he was vice-president of the Berlin Academy.

=== Portraits ===
Pape was also a sought after portrait artist and was able to personally portray both the Emperor and his family several times, including, The Royal Family in Park Sanssouci: Wilhelm II, the Empress and the eldest princes. He also painted portraits of many politicians, academics, artists, and aristocrats of the German Empire (many of which are held at the Berlinische Galerie), including:

- Heinrich VII, Prince Reuss of Köstritz
- Princess Marie Radziwill
- Prince Antoni Wilhelm Radziwiłł
- Adolf Engler
- Adolf Erman
- Alexander Conze
- Amandus Schwarz
- August von Mackensen
- Emil Fischer
- Baron von Cramm-Burgdorf
- Fritz Schaper
- Count Edzard zu Innhausen und Knyphausen
- Prof. Emil Warburg
- Wilhelm von Wedell-Piesdorf

=== Gallery ===
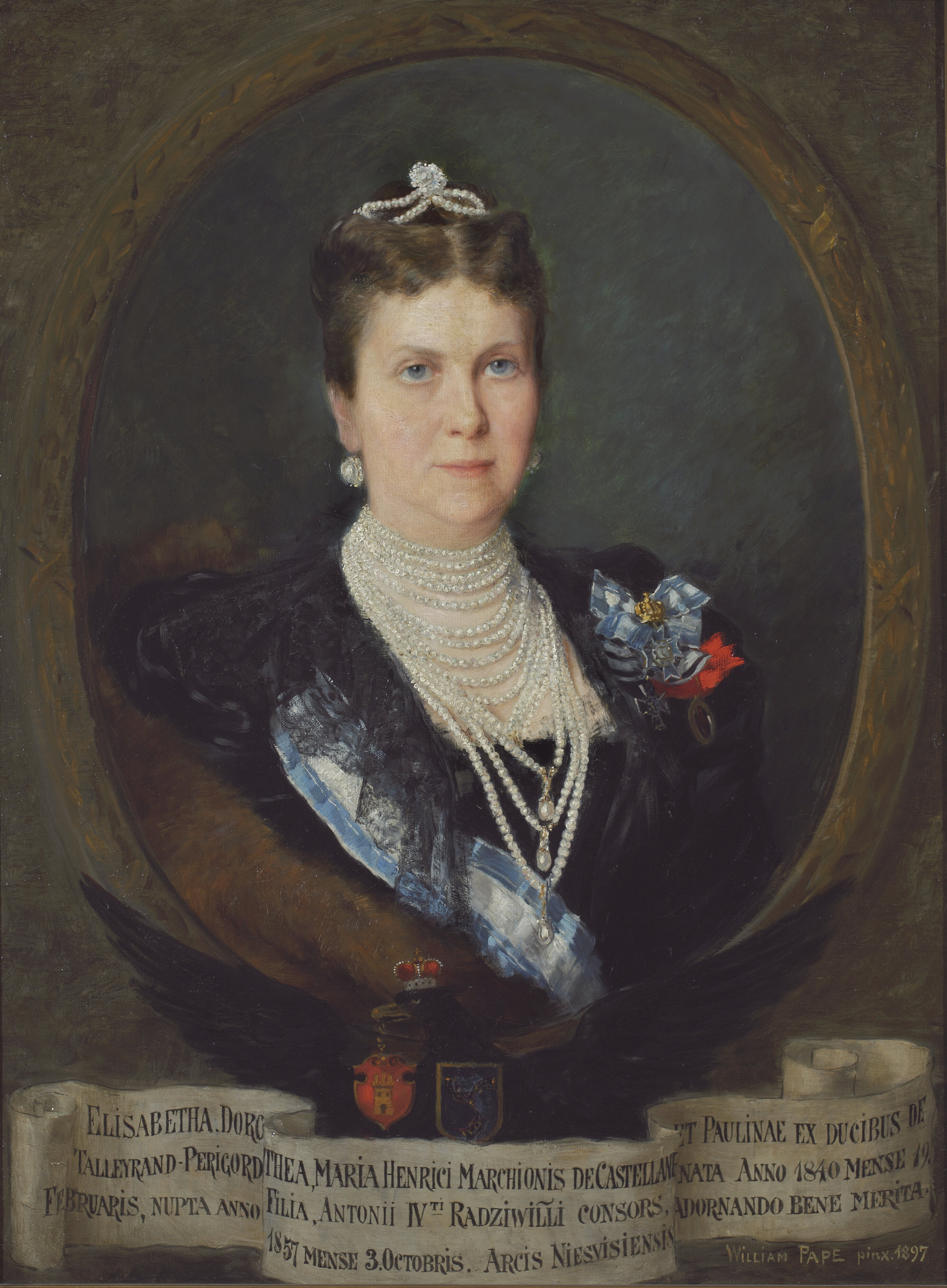
Princess Marie Radziwill, 1897

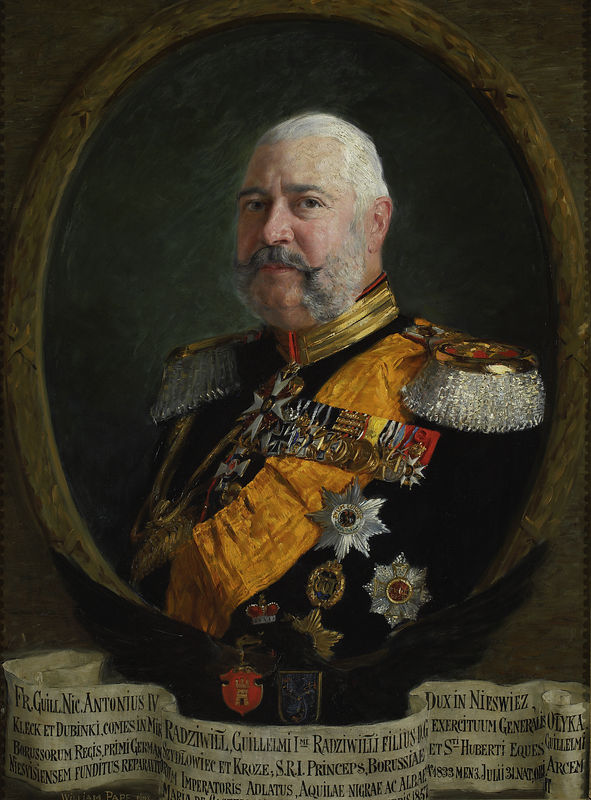
Prince Antoni Wilhelm Radziwiłł, 1897

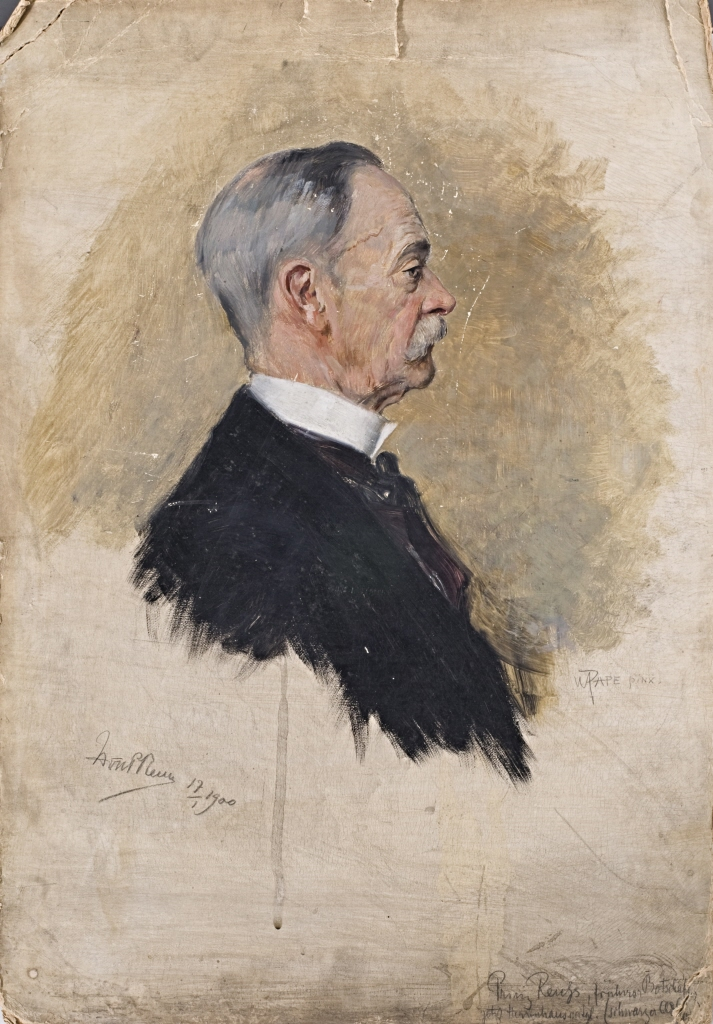
Heinrich VII, Prince Reuss of Köstritz, 1900

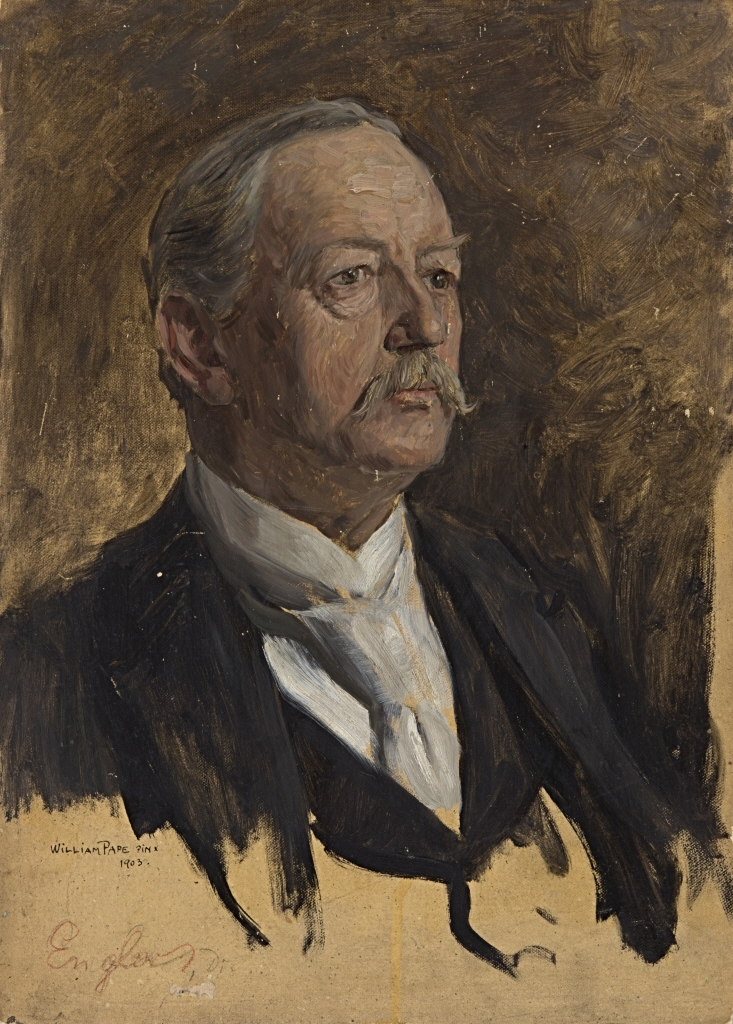
Adolf Engler, 1903

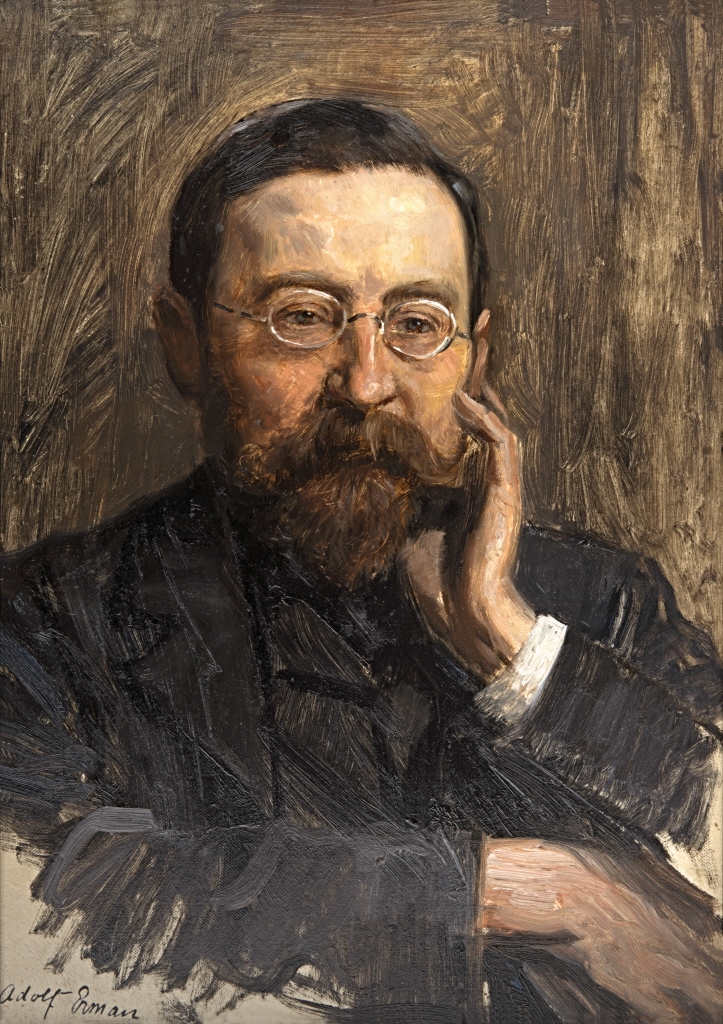
Adolf Erman, c. 1900-1905

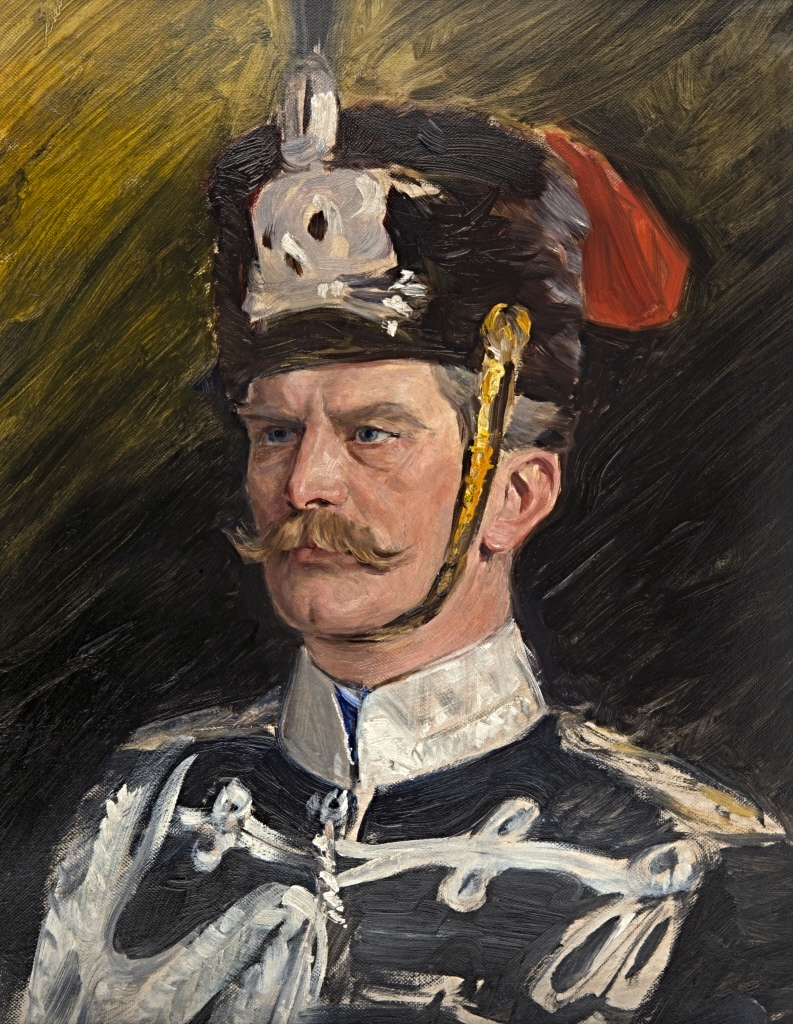
August von Mackensen, c. 1900-1905

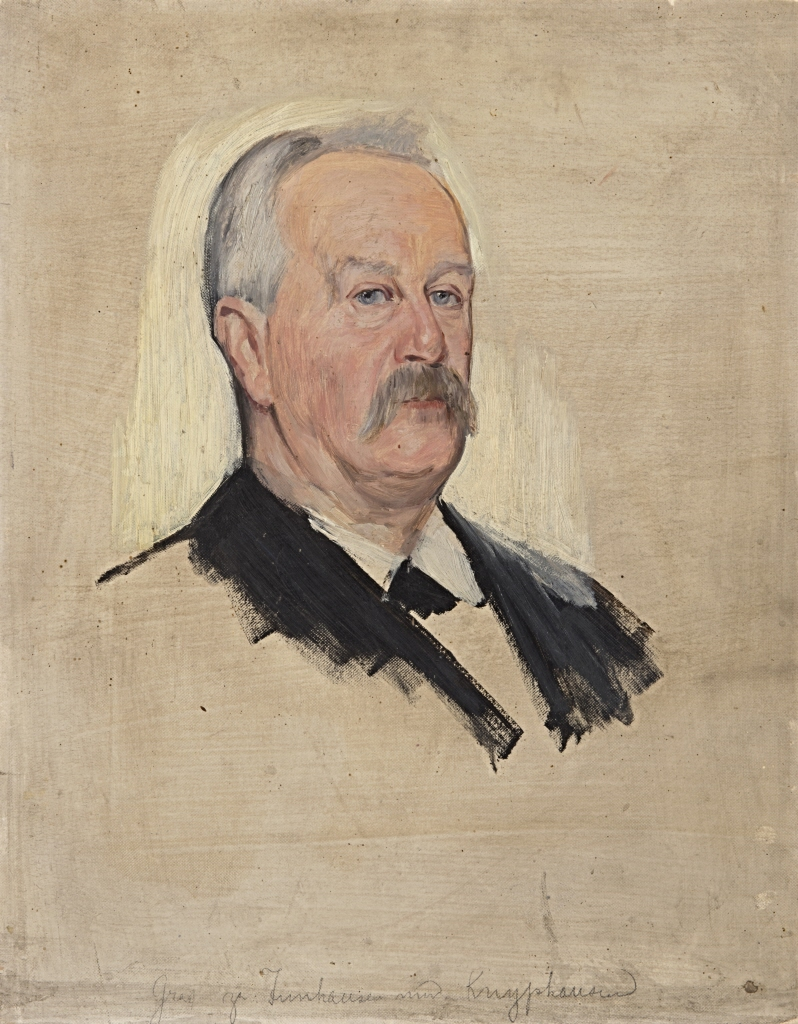
Count Edzard zu Innhausen und Knyphausen, c. 1900-1905

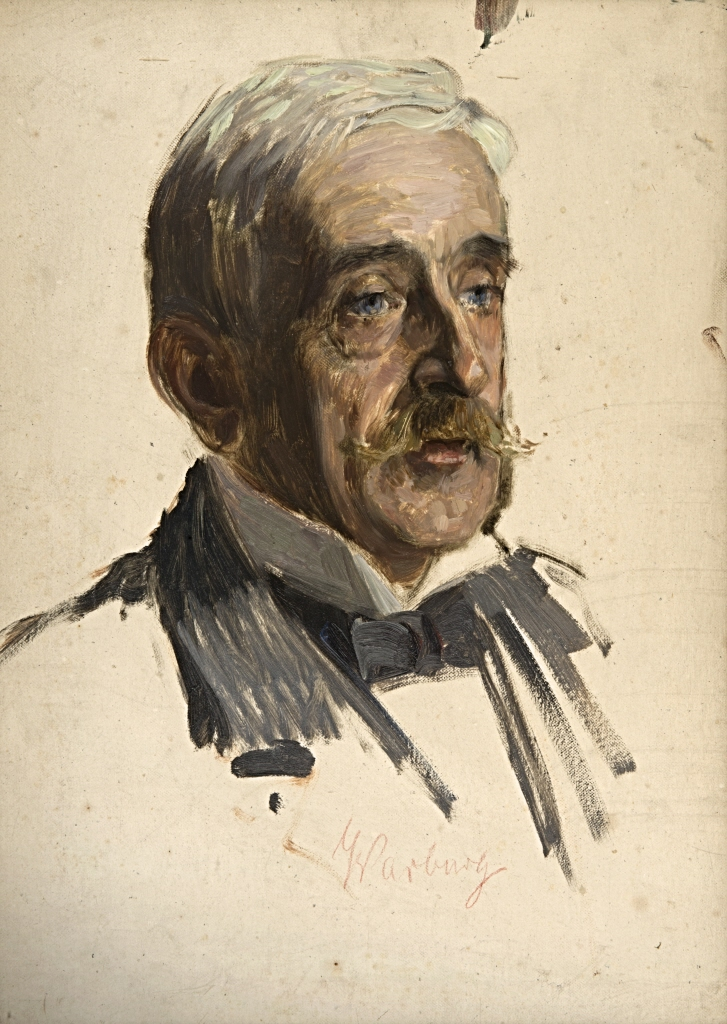
Prof. Emil Warburg, c. 1900-1905

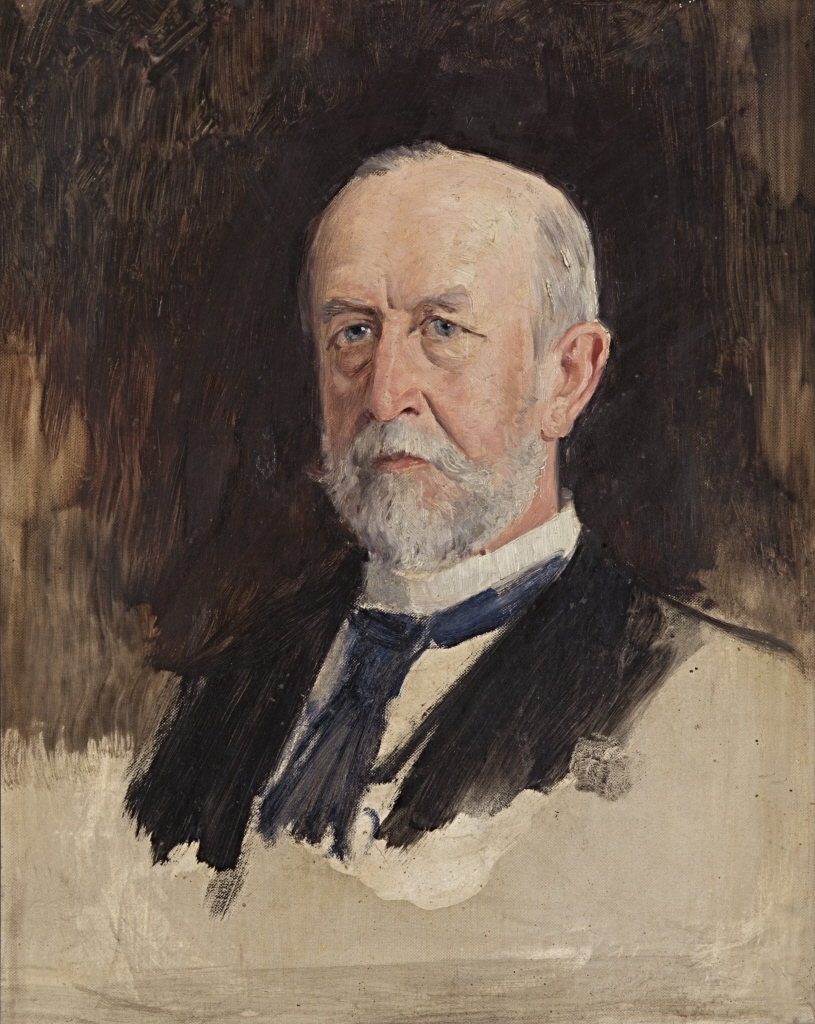
Wilhelm von Wedell-Piesdorf, c. 1900-1905

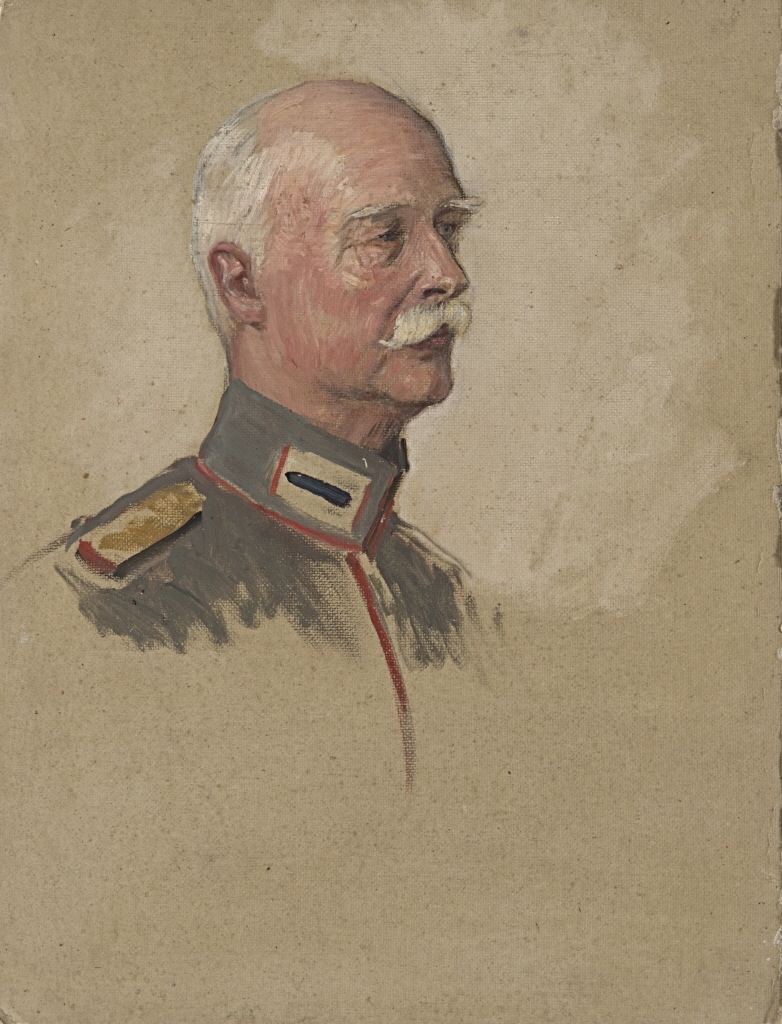
Prince zu Solms-Barnith, 1916

=== Stamps ===
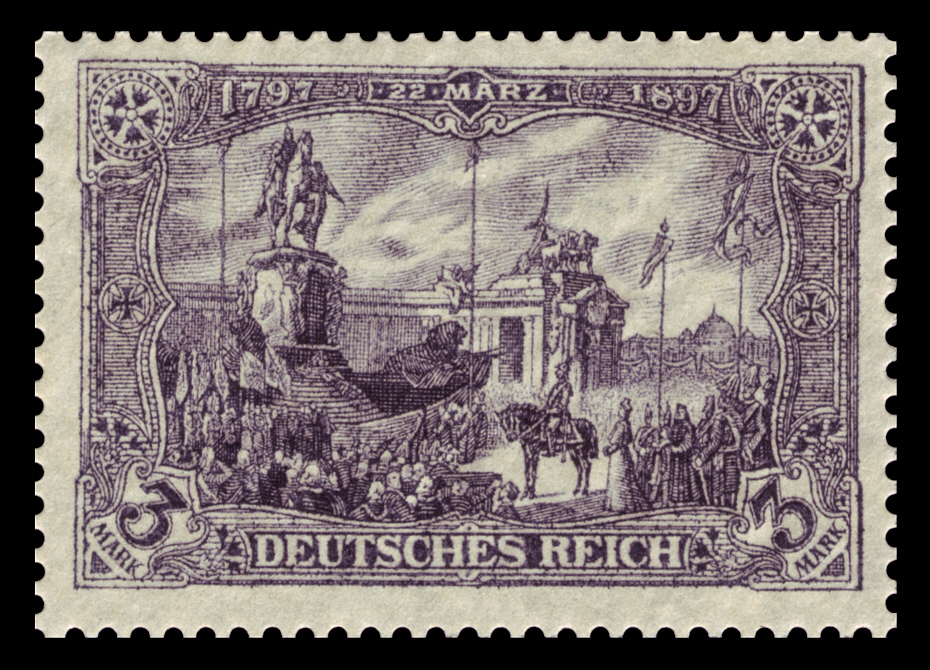
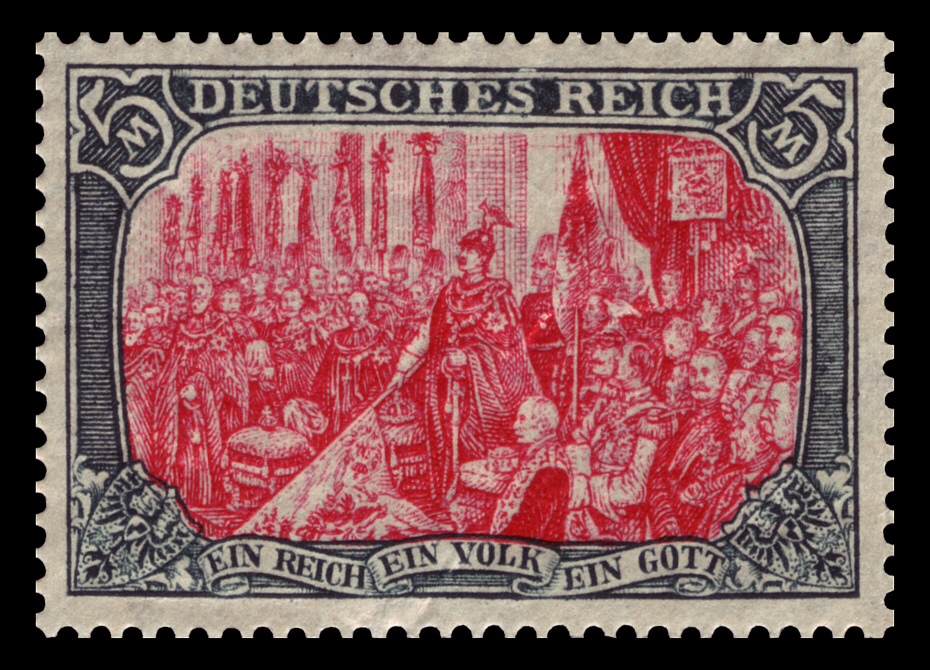
1918 stamps featuring Pape's paintings

Beginning in 1900, One Empire, One People, One God and The Unveiling of the Kaiser Wilhelm I Monument in Berlin served as a template for the 5 and 3 Reichsmarks, respectively.

== Personal life ==
Pape died on 13 December 1920 in Stockholm, Sweden after being struck by a car. He had been in Sweden to paint the presentation of the Nobel prizes.
