= Battle of Stadtlohn =

1623 battle of the Thirty Years' War

Coordinates: 52°01′11″N 6°56′48″E

- Part of the Palatinate phase of the Thirty Years' War
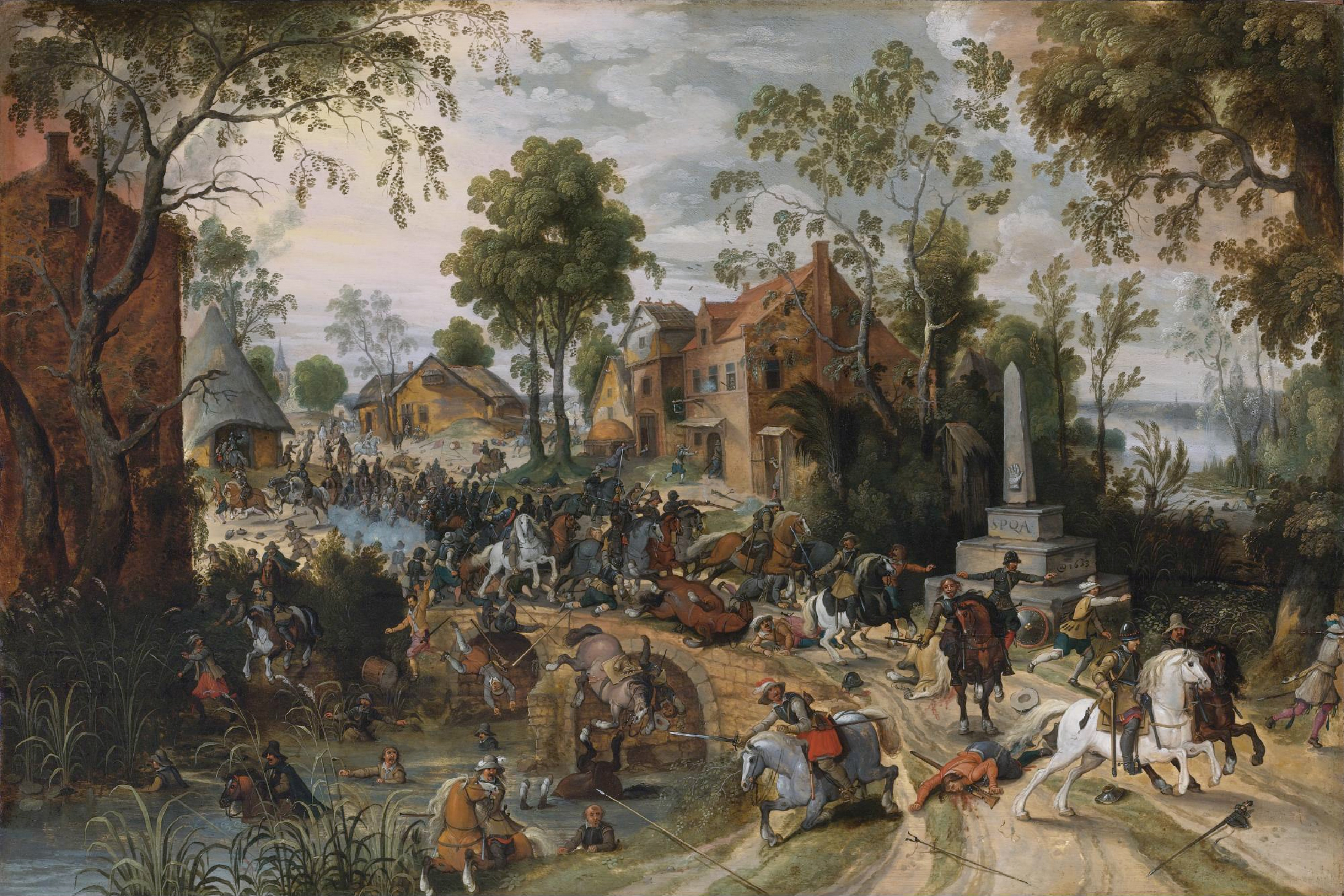
- The route of the Protestant Army at Stadtlohn
Date	6 August 1623
Location	Stadtlohn, Prince-Bishopric of Münster (present-day North Rhine-Westphalia, Germany)
Result	Catholic victory End of the Bohemian-Palatinate War (1618–1623)

Belligerents
Electoral Palatinate	Holy Roman Empire: Catholic League

Commanders and leaders
Christian of Brunswick; Hermann Styrum; Dodo zu Knyphausen	Count of Tilly; Graf Anholt

Strength
15,000	5,000+ cavalry 15,000+ infantry 14 guns

Casualties and losses
6,000 dead 4,000 captured	1,000 dead or wounded
- Location within North Rhine-Westphalia Stadtlohn (Germany)

The Battle of Stadtlohn was fought on 6 August 1623 between the armies of the Electoral Palatinate and of the Catholic League during the Thirty Years' War. The League's forces were led by Johann Tserclaes, Count of Tilly, the Protestants by Christian of Brunswick. The battle resulted in a resounding Catholic victory that largely ended the military resistance of the Palatinate forces and thus marked the end of the first phase of the Thirty Years' War.

== Campaign ==
A year after his defeat at the Battle of Fleurus, Christian of Brunswick found himself in command of an army of 15,000, freshly recruited and rested from winter quarters in the United Provinces. He reopened his campaign in the summer of 1623 by marching into the Lower Saxon Circle.

With no support forthcoming from other Protestant princes, or even from Christian's recent ally Ernst von Mansfeld, Christian now found himself in a precarious military position with little possibility of reinforcement. To add to this, Tilly had received word of Christian's movements and was now moving to confront him. The second half of July 1623 thus became a period of retreat for Christian's forces, as Tilly's troops had marched across the Saxon border on 13 July. Christian reportedly marched across the Weser River on 27 July and the Ems River a few days later, with the Count of Tilly's more disciplined troops steadily gaining ground.

When Christian left Greven, (north of Münster), on 4 August, Tilly was only half an hour behind. Christian's rearguard managed to ward off an engagement for two more days, holding the bridges first over the Vechte (at Metelen) and then over the Dinkel (at Heek). Tilly's army continued to pursue Christian's. His vanguard, commanded by Johann Jakob, Count of Bronckhorst and Anholt, engaged Christian's rearguard, commanded by Colonel Styrum, near Heek on the morning of 6 August, forcing Christian to fall back across the Ahauser Aa (upper Schipbeek), meeting up with the rearguard, commanded by Baron Knyphausen, between the villages of Wessum and Wüllen.

== Battle ==
At 2 p.m. on 6 August, Christian, after several more hours of retreat, was forced to turn and fight just outside the village of Stadtlohn in Westphalia, in a parish boundary ditch known as the Wüllener Landwehr, a little over five miles short of the Dutch border. The Catholics took the date to be an auspicious sign, since it was the Feast of the Transfiguration. Taking position on a hill, Christian's forces withstood lengthy bombardment before an attack by Tilly's cavalry engulfed Christian's right flank, leading his own cavalry to break and rout. On this sight, the infantrymen also attempted to flee. Tilly's forces swept upon their retreating enemies, killing some 6,000 and capturing 4,000 more as prisoners of war. Among the losses were 50 of Christian's highest-ranking officers, and all of his artillery and ammunition. Christian himself escaped, together with 5,500 survivors. Tilly's army suffered 1,000 casualties. A thousand of the prisoners of war enlisted in Tilly's army, but most deserted when they found standards of discipline higher than they had become used to in Christian's army.

The captured artillery pieces were displayed on the marketplace in Coesfeld, and some of the enemy wounded were conveyed to Münster for treatment. It was reported that many of those fleeing who managed to evade their enemies, fell victim to the ill-will of the peasantry.

== Impact ==
With news of the outcome reaching Frederick V of the Palatinate, he was forced to sign an armistice with Holy Roman Emperor Ferdinand II, thus ending the 'Palatine Phase' of the Thirty Years' War.

Frederick V's hereditary lands and seat in the Electoral College were awarded to Duke Maximilian of Bavaria, an eminent leader of the Catholic League. From 1623 he styled himself Maximilian I, Elector of Bavaria and his duchy Electorate of Bavaria.

Peace would be short-lived, however, and in 1624 England, France, the United Provinces of the Netherlands, Sweden, Denmark, Savoy, Venice, and Brandenburg would join in an anti-Habsburg alliance to fight against Spain and the Holy Roman Emperor.

This was the last major battle and campaign that Christian of Brunswick would undertake and participate in. He would attempt to embark on one more campaign in 1626 before succumbing to an illness on 16 June 1626, at the age of 26 in Wolfenbüttel.
