= Battle in the Bay of Matanzas =

Naval battle during Eighty Years' War

Coordinates: 23.3333°N 81.5667°W

- Part of the Eighty Years' War
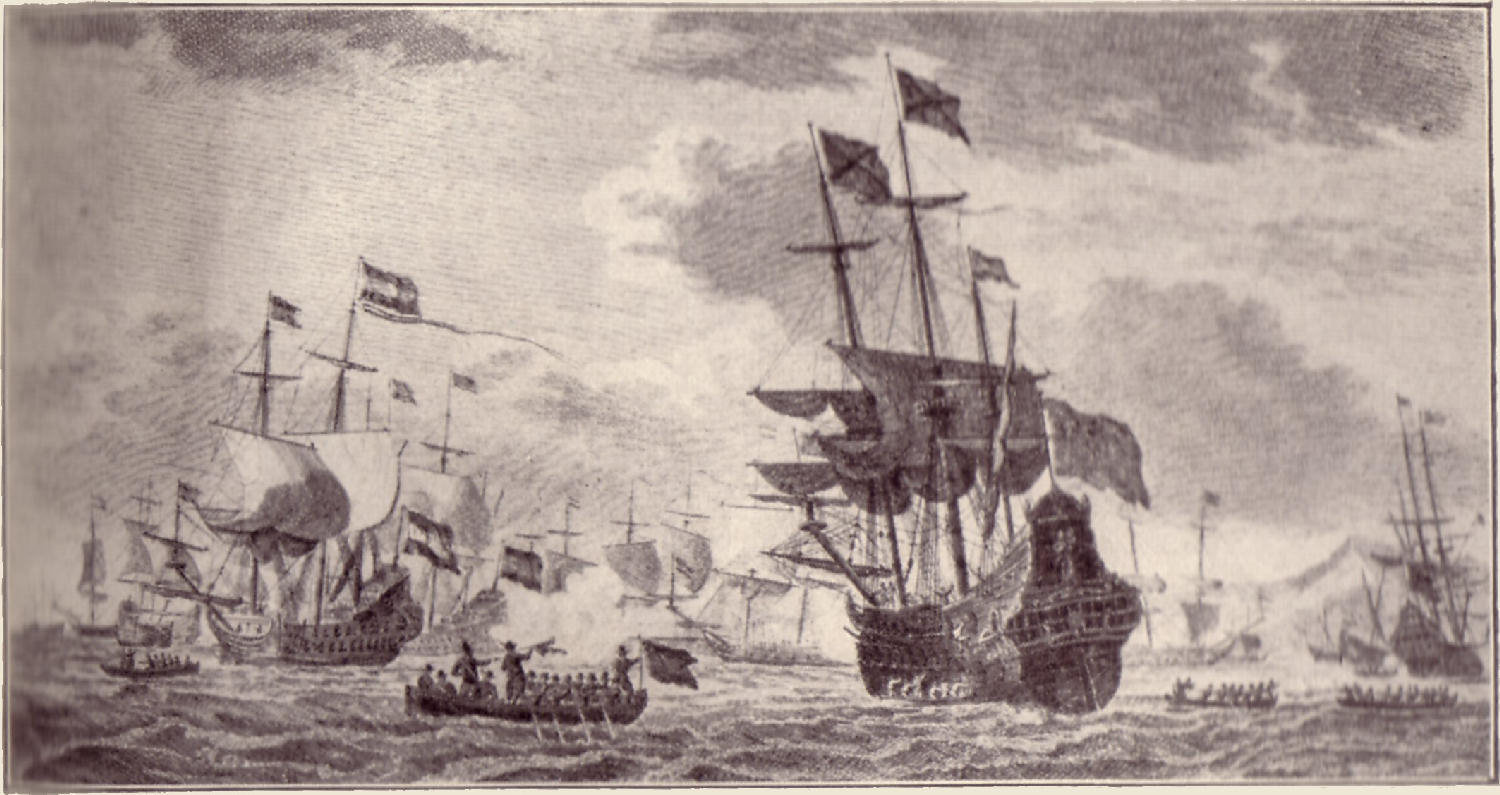
- Piet Hein capturing the Spanish silver fleet during the battle. The Story of New Netherland (1909).
Date	7–8 September 1628
Location	Near Matanzas, Cuba
Result	Dutch victory

Belligerents
Dutch Republic	Spain

Commanders and leaders
(Dutch Republic) Piet Hein (Dutch Republic) Witte de With	(Spain) Juan de Benavides Bazán

Strength
31 vessels	21 vessels

Casualties and losses
No casualties	12 vessels captured Minimal casualties

The Battle in the Bay of Matanzas was a naval battle in Cuba during the Eighty Years' War in which a Dutch squadron was able to defeat and capture a Spanish treasure fleet.

== Overview ==
In 1628, Admiral Piet Hein, with Witte de With as his flag captain, sailed out to capture the Spanish treasure fleet loaded with silver from their American colonies. With him was Admiral Hendrick Lonck, and he was later joined by a squadron of Vice-Admiral Joost Banckert. Part of the Spanish fleet in Venezuela had been warned because a Dutch cabin boy had lost his way on Blanquilla and was captured, betraying the plan, but the other half from Mexico continued its voyage, unaware of the threat.

On the evening of the engagement, the Spanish fleet, bound for the Bay of Matanzas, succeeded in entering the bay ahead of the Dutch forces as night fell and deliberately ran their ships aground in shallow water. The following day, Admiral Piet Hein launched an attack with his boats, whereupon the Spanish vessels promptly surrendered without terms. As a result, at the cost of only minimal casualties, the Dutch captured the following cargo:

- 177,537 pounds of silver (in chests and bars)
- 135 pounds of gold
- 37,375 hides
- 2,270 chests of indigo
- 7,961 pieces of logwood
- 735 chests of cochineal
- 235 chests of sugar

Altogether, Hein captured 11,509,524 guilders (half a billion Euros in today's money; £1 million using sterling/guilder exchange rates in the 1620s) of booty in gold, silver, and expensive trade goods, such as indigo and cochineal, without any bloodshed.

The Dutch didn't keep their prisoners: they gave the Spanish crews ample supplies for a march to Havana. The released men were surprised to hear the admiral personally giving them directions in fluent Spanish; Hein after all was well acquainted with the language as he had been a Spanish prisoner after 1603. The taking of the treasure was the Dutch West India Company's greatest victory in the Caribbean.

== Aftermath ==
The major effect of this Spanish treasure fleet major hijacking was the growing reluctance of the Spanish to antagonise German Protestants as the Eighty Years' War had now shifted in favour of the Dutch Republic. In the contexts of the subsequent Thirty Years' War, fighting in Italy also diverted Spanish resources from their operation in Netherlands, allowing Frederick Henry to besiege 's-Hertogenbosch in 1629. Imperial intervention could not prevent its fall.

Hein returned to the Netherlands in 1629, where he was hailed as a hero. Watching the crowds cheering him standing on the balcony of the town hall of Leiden he remarked to the town mayor: "Now they praise me because I gained riches without the least danger; but earlier when I risked my life in full combat they didn't even know I existed." He was the first and last to capture such a large part of a Spanish "silver fleet" from the Americas, these fleets being very well-protected.

== Bibliography ==
- Israel, Jonathan (1995b). The Dutch Republic: Its Rise, Greatness, and Fall 1477–1806. Oxford: Clarendon Press. ISBN 0-19-873072-1.
