= Eberhard von Danckelmann =

Prussian politician (1643–1722)

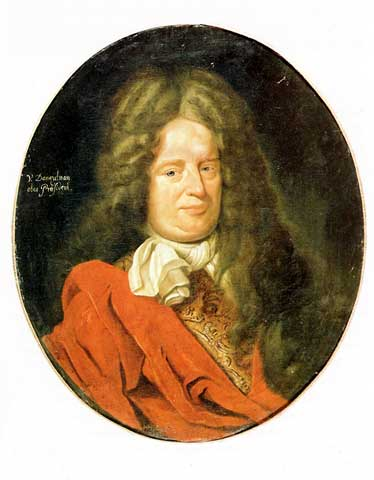
Painting of Danckelmann by David Richter, c. 1690

Eberhard Christoph Balthasar Freiherr von Danckelmann (23 November 1643 – 31 March 1722) was a German official who served as Prime Minister of Brandenburg-Prussia from 1692 to 1697.

== Early life ==
Danckelmann was born in Lingen to a middle-class family which had been raised to nobility by Frederick William, Elector of Brandenburg. He was educated in the Netherlands, England, France, and Italy. Danckelmann was a tutor of Frederick III and became a leading politician upon Frederick's succession of Frederick William as prince-elector.

== Career ==
Danckelmann was Oberpräsident of the Privy Council and de facto Prime Minister of Brandenburg. He promoted trade, industry, art, and science; during his administration, the Prussian Academy of Arts in Berlin and the University of Halle were founded, while Andreas Schlüter was employed as a court architect.

Danckelmann coordinated the Prussian Army while it covered the lower Rhine during William of Orange's landing in England; the Prussian Field Marshal Schomberg accompanied William to England. Danckelmann also allied Brandenburg-Prussia with the Grand Alliance against King Louis XIV of France. Despite Brandenburg-Prussia's military support for the allies, the state received little at the 1697 Peace of Ryswick.

Danckelmann was sacked after the peace treaty, but the lack of wartime results was not the only thing that led to his downfall. His stern Calvinism contrasted with pomp of Frederick III's court, and he was disliked by Electress Sophia Charlotte. Frederick also blamed Danckelmann for opposing his goal of acquiring a royal title.

Charges of corruption were brought against Danckelmann, who was imprisoned for several years and had his property confiscated. He was eventually freed from lack of evidence, but he was relegated to living on a state pension in Berlin. Dodo von Knyphausen was another political scapegoat after Ryswick. The efficient Danckelmann and Knyphausen were succeeded by the three "W(oes)", Wartenberg, Wittgenstein, and Wartensleben, under whose leadership Frederick's government began to corrupt.

== Sources ==
- Koch, H. W. (1978). A History of Prussia. New York: Barnes & Noble Books. p. 326. ISBN 0-88029-158-3.
- Feuchtwanger, E. J. (1970). Prussia: Myth and Reality: The Role of Prussia in German History. Chicago: Henry Regnery Company. p. 262.
- Vogler, Günter; Klaus Vetter (1970). Preußen: Von den Anfänge bis zur Reichsgründung (in German). Berlin: VEB Deutscher Verlag der Wissenschaften. p. 327.
