= Johann Jakob, Count of Bronckhorst and Anholt =

Austrian field marshal (1582–1630)

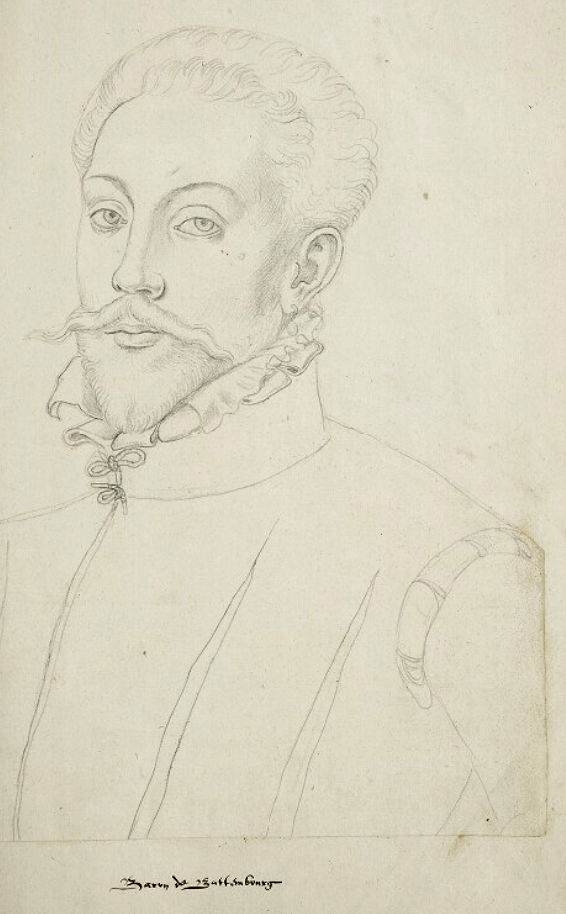
Portrait of Johann Jakob von Bronckhorst-Batenburg

Johann Jakob von Bronckhorst (Burg Anholt, 12 February 1582 – Freiburg im Breisgau, 19 October 1630), named Graf Anholt, was Count of Bronckhorst-Batenburg. He was a field marshal in the Holy Roman Empire during the Thirty Years' War.

== Life ==
He was the second son of Jacob of Bronckhorst-Batenburg (1553–1582) and Gertrud of Myllendonk (1552–1612). He studied in Lorraine and did a Grand Tour of Italy. In 1603, like his father, he entered the Spanish army. After the Twelve Years' Truce in 1609, he became a colonel in the Austrian army. His commander Leopold V, Archduke of Austria, appointed him in his Geheimrat and made him commander of a Regiment. He fought in the Thirty Years' War in 1618, and also participated in the Battle of White Mountain in 1620. As a reward, he became count in 1621 and Field Marshal the following year.|

In 1622/23 he fought in Westfalen against Christian von Braunschweig-Wolfenbüttel and Peter Ernst von Mansfeld, which he pushed back into East Frisia. He played an important role in the victory in the Battle of Stadtlohn, as commander of the vanguard.

In 1624 he participated in the Siege of Breda under Ambrosio Spinola, and fought later under Tilly in Osnabrück against the Danes. In the Winter of 1627/28 he took up winter quarters in East Frisia. In 1628 he became a Knight in the Order of the Golden Fleece, and in 1629 he became Governor of the Alsace and of Further Austria. In 1630 he died in Freiburg from tuberculosis.

== Family ==
Johann Jakob married, on 6 November 1618, Maria Cleopha von Hohenzollern-Sigmaringen, daughter of Charles II, Count of Hohenzollern-Sigmaringen and Elisabeth von Pallandt-Culemborg. They had two children:

- Johanna Katharina Isabelle (1627–1685) who married, in 1641, Jacques Philip of Croÿ-Millendonck (died 1683). Their son was Fieldmarshal Charles Eugène de Croÿ.
- Dietrich
