= Montecuccoli =

Coat of arms of Montecuccoli family

The House of Montecuccoli is an old Italian noble family that originated from the Castello di Montecuccolo near Pavullo nel Frignano, in the historical territory of the Duchy of Modena and Reggio. Over time, a prominent branch of the family became fully integrated into the Austrian nobility, especially through military and diplomatic service to the Habsburg monarchy. Despite their assimilation into Austrian society, they retained their Italian surname and cultural heritage.

One of the most distinguished members of the house was Raimondo Montecuccoli, a renowned general and military theorist of the 17th century, who rose to the rank of Field Marshal for his service during the Thirty Years' War and subsequent conflicts. Other members of the family also held high-ranking positions in the imperial army and court.

== Notable members ==
- Sebastiano de Montecuccoli (died 1536), Italian nobleman in French service
- Count Ernesto Montecuccoli (1582–1633), general for the Holy Roman Empire in the Thirty Years' War
- Raimondo Montecuccoli (1609–1680), Italian military general in Austrian service
- Leopold Philip Montecuccoli (1663–1698), Austrian general, Prince of the Holy Roman Empire
- Rudolf Montecuccoli (1843–1922), chief of the Austro-Hungarian Navy

== See also ==
- Condottieri class cruiser, also called Montecuccoli class cruiser
- Italian cruiser Raimondo Montecuccoli, an Italian Navy light cruiser in commission from 1935 to 1964
