= Albrecht Georg of Limburg =

Count of Limburg

Albrecht Georg of Limburg (1660–1690) was a count of Limburg and Bronckhorst. He was the fifth son of Otto of Limburg.

He married in 1684 Elisabeth Philippine van Boetzelaer (died 1692) and they had one daughter,

- Maria, heiress of the county of Bronckhorst (1689–1759). She married in 1714 the Landgrave Philipp of Hesse-Philippsthal (died 1717).

Albrecht Georg died in 1690.
