= Dodo zu Innhausen und Knyphausen =

German soldier and general of the Thirty Years' War (1583–1636)

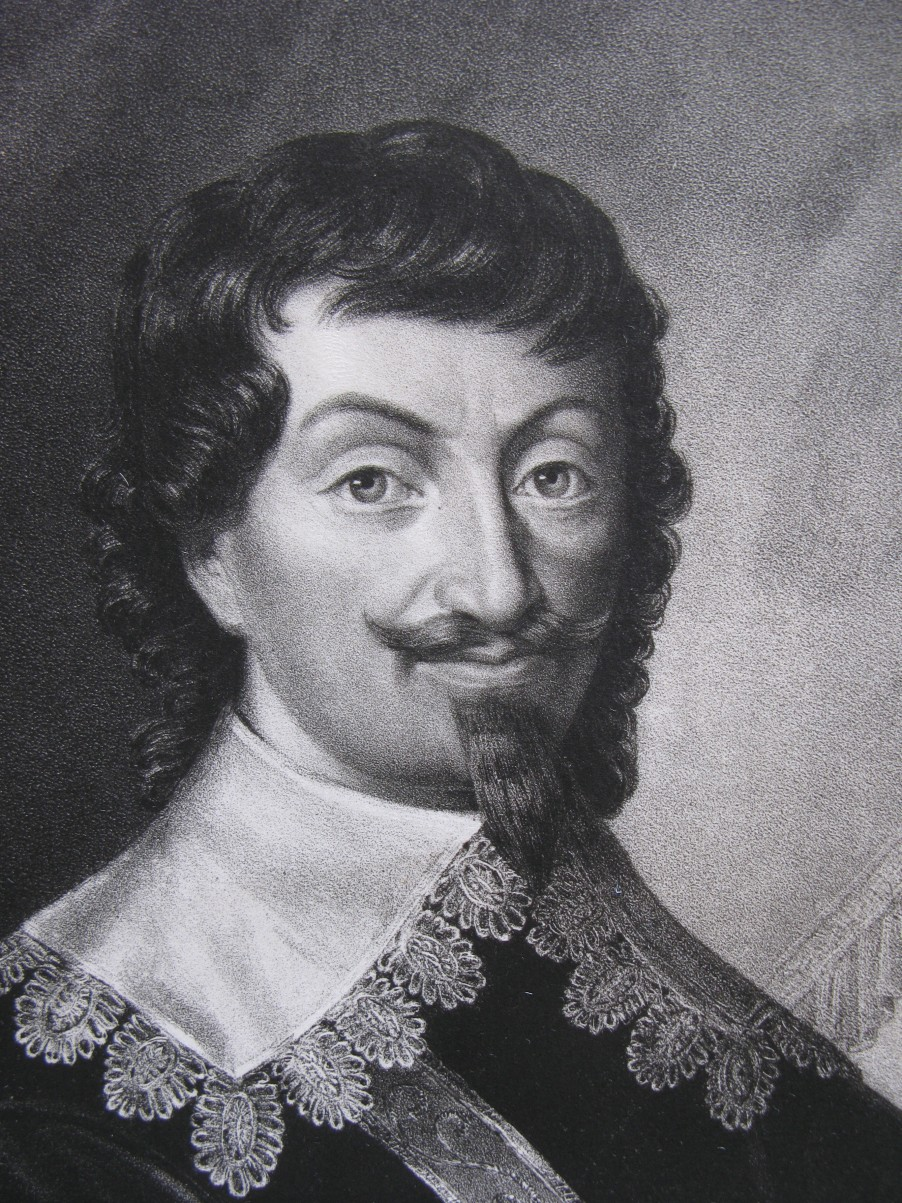
Dodo von Knyphausen

Dodo Freiherr zu Innhausen und Knyphausen (sometimes Knijphausen or Kniphausen; 2 July 1583 – 11 January 1636) was a German professional soldier who saw extensive service in the Thirty Years' War (1618–1648), rising to the rank of Field Marshal in Swedish service in 1633.

== Early career ==
Knyphausen was from Lütetsburg, East Frisia. He learnt his trade in Dutch service under Maurice of Orange, rising to the rank of captain by 1603. He later served the Hanseatic League, then the Protestant Union. In the 1620s, with the Thirty Years' War turning against the Protestants, Knyphausen had the misfortune to be repeatedly on the losing side, witnessing the defeats at the Battle of Höchst (1622) and the battle of Stadtlohn (1623). After the latter battle he was accused of treason and even sentenced to death, only to be exonerated. He fought under Ernst von Mansfeld at the Battle of Dessau Bridge in 1626, but was captured. In 1628 during the Siege of La Rochelle, he went into English service and raised troops, during the final abortive English attempt to relieve the Huguenot stronghold.

== Swedish service ==
Knyphausen entered into Swedish service in 1630 and raised several German regiments for the Swedish crown. As a result of his many years of professional experience he was greatly valued by King Gustavus Adolphus of Sweden, and was often assigned the most critical tasks, such as the defence of Neubrandenburg in 1631 (where he was captured by the forces of Johann Tserclaes, Count of Tilly) and command of the Sweden's most important military supply base in central Germany at Nuremberg in 1632.

At the 1632 Battle of Lützen, where the Swedish king was killed, Knyphausen, now holding the rank of Major General, was third in command of the Swedish army and responsible for the entire second (reserve) line. At the height of the battle, and with the Swedish army close to panic as a result of the king's death and destruction of the Swedish infantry centre, Knyphausen played a large part in holding the Swedish army together for two crucial hours. The Swedish royal secretary Philipp Sattler wrote that Knyphausen had contributed greatly to the final victory, having "done the most to sustain the wavering battleline".

In January 1633, as a reward for his service at Lützen, Knyphausen was appointed Field Marshal and commander-in-chief of all Swedish forces operating in Lower Saxony, an important side-theatre to the main Swedish operations in Southern Germany. In this role he served at the major Swedish victory at the Battle of Oldendorf in 1633. From 1633 to 1634 he participated in an unsuccessful Siege of Hildesheim. At the minor Battle of Haselünne in early 1636 he was killed.

A distant relative, Edzard zu Innhausen und Knyphausen (1827–1908) was a noted politician.
