= Battle of Wiesloch (1632) =

1632 battle of the Thirty Years' War

Coordinates: 49°17′36″N 8°40′19″E

- Part of the Thirty Years War
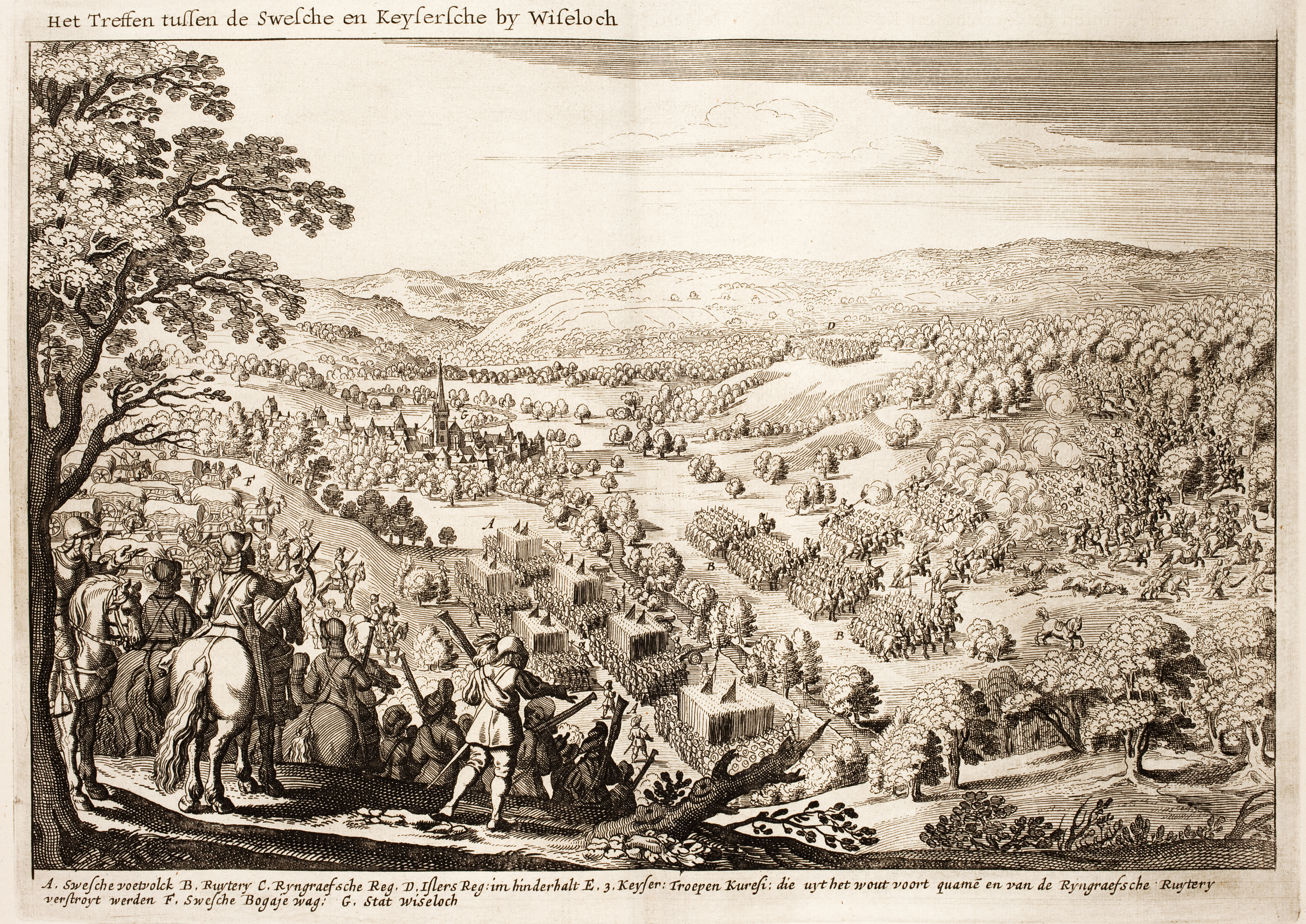
- Battlefield view from the west in a period woodcut
Date	16 August 1632
Location	Wiesloch, Swabian Circle, Holy Roman Empire present-day Baden-Württemberg, Germany
Result	Swedish victory

Belligerents
Swedish Empire	Holy Roman Empire

Commanders and leaders
(Swedish Empire) Gustav Horn	(Holy Roman Empire) Ernesto Montecuccoli

Strength
10,000	11,000

Casualties and losses
Unknown	Unknown
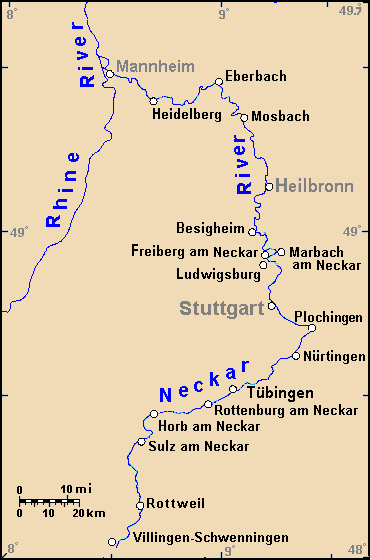
- Location within Neckar region Wiesloch (Baden-Württemberg) Wiesloch (Germany)

The Battle of Wiesloch (German: Schlacht bei Wiesloch) occurred on 16 August 1632 during the Thirty Years' War near the German city of Wiesloch, south of Heidelberg.

A Swedish army led by Count Gustav Horn fought an army of the Holy Roman Empire led by Count Ernesto Montecuccoli.

The battle resulted in a Swedish victory.
