= Friedrich Wilhelm of Limburg =

Friedrich Wilhelm of Limburg-Styrum, (July 1649 – July 1722) count of Limburg and Bronckhorst was the son of Otto of Limburg-Styrum.

He married in 1683 Lucia d'Aylva and they had seven children: (possibly)

- Otto II of Limburg, count of Limburg and Bronckhorst (1685–1769), father of:
  - Friedrich Wilhelm (1723–1747). His great-great-grandson was Friedrich zu Limburg-Stirum.
  - Albert Dominicus (1725–1776), father of:
    - Leopold Karel, Count of Limburg Stirum;
    - Samuel Johann (1754–1824), father of:
      - Wilhelm Bernard (1795–1889). His great-grandson was Charles of Limburg Stirum.
      - Otto Leopold (1801–1879). His grandson was Johan Paul van Limburg Stirum.
- Albert Dominicus of Limburg and Bronckhorst (1686 – 1704, in Portugal);
- Friedrich Heinrich of Limburg and Bronckhorst (1689–1740);
- Leopold of Limburg and Bronckhorst (1694–1728), who married in 1722 Helene de Haze (1681–1753);
- Maria Anna of Limburg and Bronckhorst (1688–1759);
- Sophie Charlotte (1690–1729). She married in 1727 Jan Karel van Lynden d'Aspremont (died 1728); and
- Eleonore, (1697–1769).
