= Hermann Otto I of Limburg-Styrum =

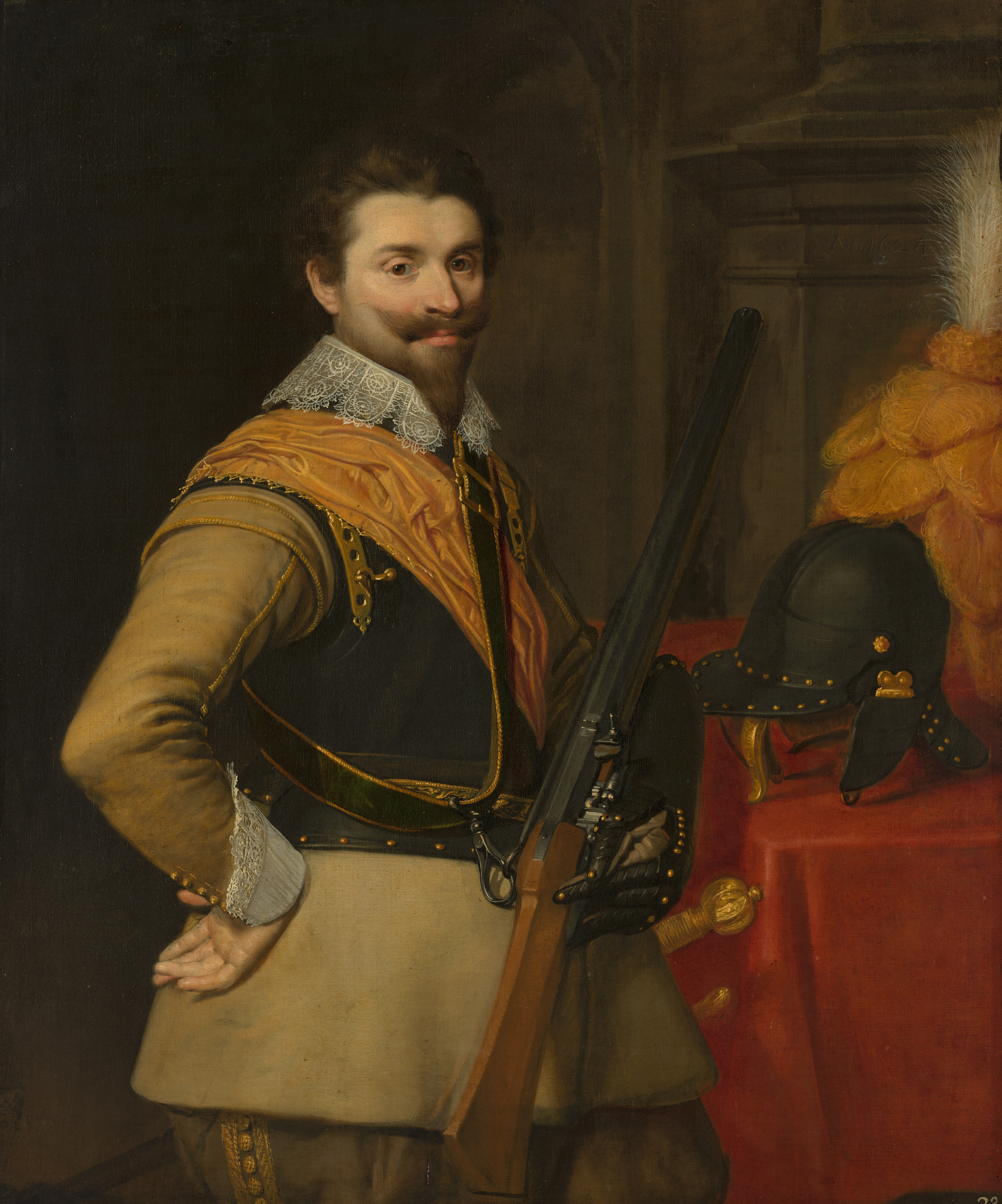
Herman Otto I

Hermann Otto I of Limburg-Styrum, count of Limburg and Bronckhorst, lord of Styrum, Gemen, Wisch and Borculo, and from 1640 to 1644 advocate of the imperial abbey of Vreden, was born in about 1592, and died on 17 October 1644. He was the eldest son of Jobst of Limburg Stirum.

== Family ==
He married baroness Anna Magdalena Spies von Büllesheim (1599–1659) in 1618 and had four children:

- Otto, count of Limburg, Bronckhorst, Wisch and Borculo, hereditary banneret of the Principality of Guelders and of the county of Zutphen (born 1620, died 1679);
- Adolf Ernst, count of Limburg Styrum, Sovereign Lord of Gemen (died 1657);
- Moritz, count of Limburg and Bronkhorst, Lord of Styrum; and
- Sophie Elisabeth (died 1686), who married Count Ferdinand Gottfried von Velen und Meggen.

== Military career ==
Hermann Otto served in the armies of the Dutch Republic. He commanded Christian of Brunswick's rearguard at the Battle of Stadtlohn (1623) and the Dutch cavalry at the Siege of Groenlo (1627). In 1629 he was entrusted the defense of the IJssel line, but was defeated at the Battle of IJsseloord.

== Heritage ==
At his death, Hermann Otto divided his possessions amongst his three sons.

- Otto received Bronckhorst, Borculo and all the Dutch possessions; he founded the older line of the House, still alive today in Belgium and the Netherlands.
- Adolf reigned over Gemen and Illereichen until his death in 1657. He founded the line of Limburg Stirum Gemen. In 1782, with extinction of Gemen branch, Gemen was passed to the Barons of Bomelberg in 1800, and was mediatized to the Princes of Salm-Kyrburg in 1806. It passed to France in 1810, then to Prussia in 1814.
- Moritz received the ownership of Mülheim an der Ruhr and thereby of the immediate lordship of Styrum, and later Oberstein. Here he founded the line of counts of Limburg-Styrum-Styrum, extinct in 1809. In the mediatisation of 1806, Styrum came under control of the Grand Duchy of Berg. Oberstein was mediatized at the Treaty of Lunéville in 1801, however the Limburg Stirum were never compensated by the Final Recess in 1803.

All members of the House of Limburg-Stirum descend from Hermann Otto, but also a great number of monarchs, such as the present members of the Habsburg-family, the king of Belgium and the Grand-Duke of Luxemburg.
