= Dodo von Knyphausen =

Prussian nobleman (1641-1698)

Dodo von Knyphausen (1641–1698) was a German nobleman from the Duchy of Prussia in the service of Brandenburg-Prussia during the reigns of Electors Frederick William and Frederick III.

A government office to collect revenues in Brandenburg had been created in the 1650s, but it was not until Knyphausen's leadership in 1683 that this central revenues office achieved direct control over revenues from the various lands of the Brandenburg Hohenzollerns. In 1689 Knyphausen organized the creation of the efficient Geheime Hofkammer, or collegiate central control office, for Brandenburg-Prussia.

After Brandenburg-Prussia received little from the 1697 Peace of Ryswick that ended the Nine Years' War between France and the Grand Alliance, Knyphausen and Eberhard von Danckelmann were sacked as scapegoats.

== Sources ==
- Clark, C. (2006) Iron Kingdom: The Rise and Downfall of Prussia, 1600–1947, |Belknap Press of Harvard: Cambridge, Mass. ISBN 0-674-02385-4.
