= Ernesto Montecuccoli =

General of the Holy Roman Empire (1582–1633)

Count Ernesto Montecuccoli (1582 – June 17, 1633) was a general in the service of the Holy Roman Empire during the Thirty Years War, a member of the prominent Italian Montecuccoli Family. He fought in the regiment of Giorgio Basta alongside Albrecht von Wallenstein in the Long Turkish War.

Ernesto Montecuccoli's signature

In 1632, troops under Montecuccoli's command burned down the town of Knittlingen. On 16 August of the same year, Montecuccoli's forces were defeated in the Battle of Wiesloch by a Swedish army led by Count Gustav Horn.

He was the uncle of Raimondo Montecuccoli, who started his own military career under Ernesto's command in 1629.
