= Edzard zu Innhausen und Knyphausen =

Frisian landowner and politician

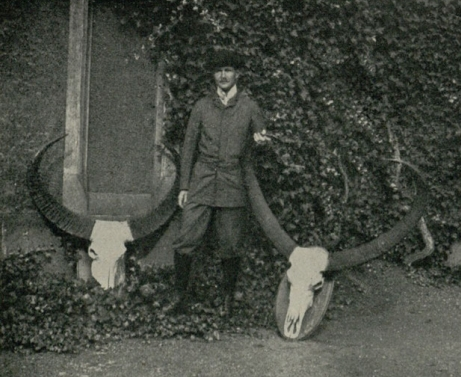
Knyphausen in Assam with buffalo skulls, 1904

Count Edzard Friedrich Ludwig zu Innhausen und Knyphausen (14 December 1827 – 16 January 1908) was a Frisian landowner and politician. He travelled across India in 1904 and wrote a book on his experiences including his hunts.

Von Knyphausen was born in Hanover to Carl Wilhelm Georg von Innhausen and Knyphausen (1784–1860) and Luise Sophie Charlotte Friederike von Kielmansegg (1798–1874). He joined the Academy in Lüneburg in 1847 and then studied law at Bonn before joining Corps Borussia Bonn. He passed the state law exam in Berlin in 1851 and served briefly at the Berlin District Court. He then travelled and became the largest landowner in East Frisia following the death of his father in 1860. He bought Knyphausen Castle in 1862 and Innhausen Castle in 1876. After Prussian annexation, he held a set representing East Frisia. He was elected to the Reichstag for the German Hanoverian Party in 1893. He helped establish the East Frisian Coast Railway, the East Frisian Sparkasse and the presided over the German Agricultural Society.

Von Knyphausen was married to Luise von Krassow (1843-1930). They had a son and nine daughters. He is buried in Lütetsburger Park.

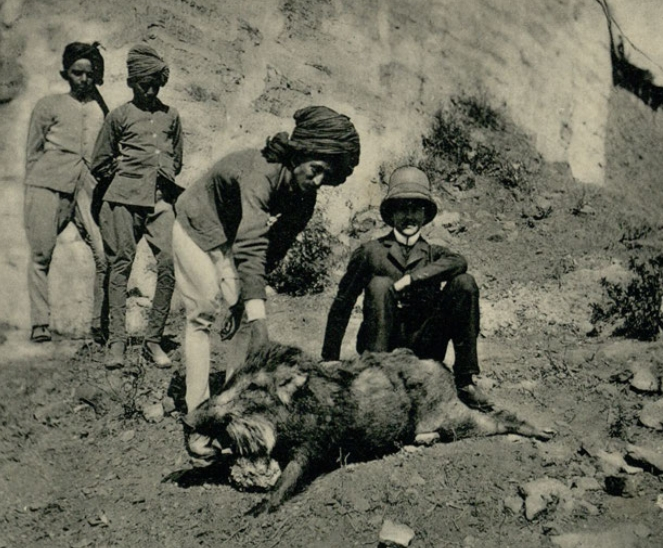

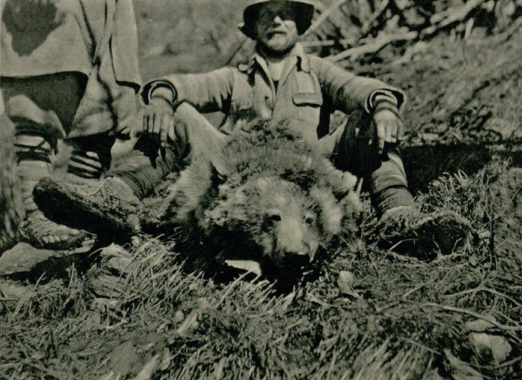

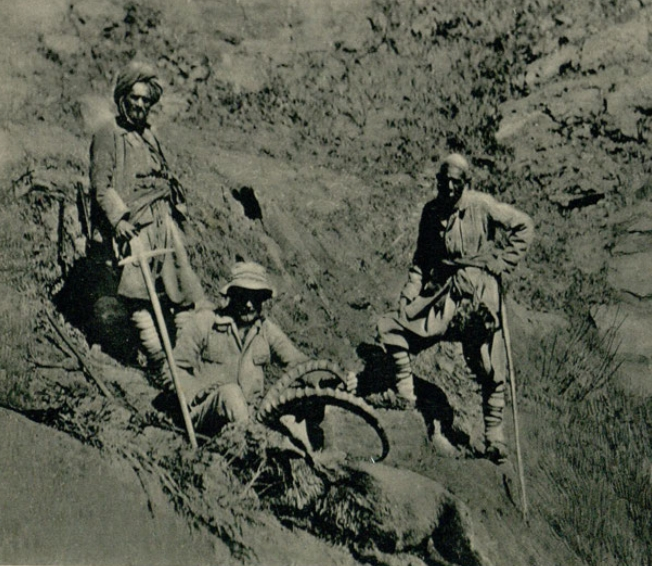
