= Collectarium of Ląd =

Cistercian calendar, repatriated to Poland from Yale

- Collectarium lądzkie
- Type: Illuminated manuscript
- Size: 230 mm x 155 mm
- Created: 1100-1175
- Present location: formerly Beinecke Rare Book and Manuscript Library, New Haven, Connecticut
- Identification: Beinecke MS 883
- Culture: Cistercian, Medieval Polish
- https://collections.library.yale.edu/catalog/2010330

The Collectarium of Ląd (Polish: Collectarium lądzkie), or Cistercian Collectar, formerly designated as Beinecke MS 883, is a 12th century Polish manuscript utilized by Ląd Abbey for the monastery's clergy and scholars. Considered lost during World War II as a result of the Nazi looting of Poland in World War II, the manuscript was considered a missing object since 1966. Eventually acquired by the Beinecke Rare Book and Manuscript Library by Yale University, an inquiry in 2024, eventually led to its repatriation to Poland in January 2026.

== Description ==
A collectarium is a medieval Christian text that contains the Collects, which have short prayers used in liturgy. Ląd Abbey, a Cistercians monastery, in present day Ląd, Greater Poland Voivodeship was established approximately in 1145 according to monastic tradition under the rule of Mieszko III in his tenure as High Duke of Poland. Believed to be written in the 12th century (1100-1175 in Western Germany, presumably in the Rhineland), the Collectar served as a calendar for the clergy, which calculates feast days, prayers, and ceremonials, such as the Temporale. Sanctorale, the Common of the Saints, Rogation days, and Dedication of a Church.

The manuscript was bound in the 15th century, covered in brown calf over bevelled oak boards with a spine with three raised bands. The covers are blind-tooled, the frame is traced with fillets, and a central panel is adorned with floral stamps. The title of "Collectarius" is stamped on the lower frame of the front cover. The overall manuscript measures 230 x 155 mm, and has 150 leaves.

=== War Loot ===
The manuscript was eventually given from the Abbey to the Archdiocesan Archive in Poznań where it was documented to be present from 1926 to 1937. At one point, it was on loan to the Polish Academy of Arts and Sciences in Kraków. Sometime after the Invasion of Poland, attempts at evacuating Poznań's manuscripts failed as both the evacuated and remaining holdings ended up in the hands of the General Government. It took until 1966 for the Collectarium to be designated as a war loss.

Decades later in the 1990s, it re-emerged into the London rare books market, where it was then purchased by Yale University as part of the Beinecke Rare Book and Manuscript Library, given the designation of Beinecke MS 883.

An inquiry by Polish officials in May 2024, supervised by Polish Cultural Minister Marta Cienkowska, and Beinecke Director Michelle Light led to the completion of the manuscript's provenance. On 29 January 2026, a formal ceremony at the Beinecke Library was held to officiate the repatriation of the Collectarium. The digitized scans remain accessible in Yale's Library Database.
