= Indie Photobook Library =

Coordinates: 41.31161°N 72.92722°W

The Indie Photobook Library is a collection of over 2,000 self-published and indie-published photo-books that promotes, showcases, and preserves photobook formats like photography exhibition catalogs, print-on-demand photobooks, artist books, zines, photobooks printed on newsprint, limited edition photobooks, and non-English language photography books. It was acquired by the Beinecke Rare Book & Manuscript Library in 2016.

== History ==
Larissa Leclair began assembling the collection in 2010, inspired by her frustration in 2009 over the lack of a centralized place to find self-published photobooks. Prior to its acquisition by the Beinecke, Leclair regularly organized exhibits drawn from the collection. The collection has been exhibited across the United States, Canada, Guatemala, China, Mexico, the Philippines, and Australia.

The collection was closed to submissions in 2016, so serves as a unique snapshot of artistic self-publishing from around 2008 to 2016. It also served as a center for advocacy for self-published photobooks during a time period that saw self-publishing rise as an important alternative to the large expensive photobooks produced by traditional publishing houses.

== Location ==
In 2016 the collection was acquired by the Beinecke Rare Book & Manuscript Library at Yale University, where it complements existing collections in the history of photography.
