= William Sperry Beinecke =

American philanthropist and businessman (1914–2018)

- Born: May 22, 1914
- Died: April 8, 2018 (aged 103)
- Education: Yale University; Columbia Law School
- Occupation: Philanthropist

William Sperry Beinecke (May 22, 1914 – April 8, 2018) was an American philanthropist and businessman.

== Career and philanthropy ==
Beinecke studied at Westminster School, Pingry School, graduated from Yale University in 1936 and Columbia Law School in 1940. He served in the U.S. Navy during the Second World War, retiring with the rank of Lieutenant Commander.

In 1952 he joined Sperry & Hutchinson, the company founded by his great-uncle Thomas Sperry, which was best known for its S&H Green Stamps, and was chairman and CEO before his retirement in 1980.

He was the principal benefactor of the Yale Golf Course at Yale University and the William Miller Sperry Observatory at Union County College in Cranford, New Jersey. He was a donor to Yale University's Beinecke Rare Book & Manuscript Library and also founded the Central Park Conservancy.

He published his memoirs in 2000.

== Family ==
William S. Beinecke was the son of Frederick W. Beinecke and Carrie Regina (Sperry) Beinecke (the daughter of William Miller Sperry) and lived in Cranford, New Jersey, until the age of 11.

Beinecke and his wife had four children, including environmentalist Frances Beinecke. Beinecke turned 100 in May 2014.

== Death ==
William Beinecke died on April 8, 2018, at the age of 103.
