= Papyrus Oxyrhynchus 218 =

Greek manuscript

Papyrus Oxyrhynchus 218 (P. Oxy. 218 or P. Oxy. II 218) is a historical fragment by an unknown author, written in Greek. It was discovered in Oxyrhynchus. The manuscript was written on papyrus in the form of a roll. It is dated to the third century AD. Currently it is housed in the British Library (Department of Manuscripts, 1183) in London.

== Description ==
The document was written by an unknown copyist. It is evidently part of a collection of "marvelous stories" (παράδοξα), a genre popular in Alexandria at the time. The measurements of the fragment are 136 by 124 mm. The text is written in a small sloping uncial hand. The margin is remarkably high at the top.

It was discovered by Grenfell and Hunt in 1897 in Oxyrhynchus. The text was published by Grenfell and Hunt in 1899.

== See also ==
- Oxyrhynchus Papyri
- Papyrus Oxyrhynchus 217
- Papyrus Oxyrhynchus 219
