= Papyrus Oxyrhynchus 214 =

Greek papyrus fragment

Papyrus Oxyrhynchus 214 (P. Oxy. 214 or P. Oxy. II 214) is a fragment of an epic by an unknown author, written in Greek. It was discovered in Oxyrhynchus. The manuscript was written on papyrus in the form of a codex. It is dated to the third century. Currently it is housed in the British Library (Department of Manuscripts, 1181) in London.

== Description ==
The document was written by an unknown copyist. The measurements of the fragment are 110 by 79 mm. The text is written in a small sloping uncial hand. The handwriting is very similar to that of P. Oxy. 233.

There are no stops other than the diaresis.

It was discovered by Grenfell and Hunt in 1897 in Oxyrhynchus. It was found with a number of cursive documents. The text was published by Grenfell and Hunt in 1899.

== See also ==
- Oxyrhynchus Papyri
- Papyrus Oxyrhynchus 213
- Papyrus Oxyrhynchus 215
