= Ląd Abbey =

- Opactwo Cystersów w Lądzie
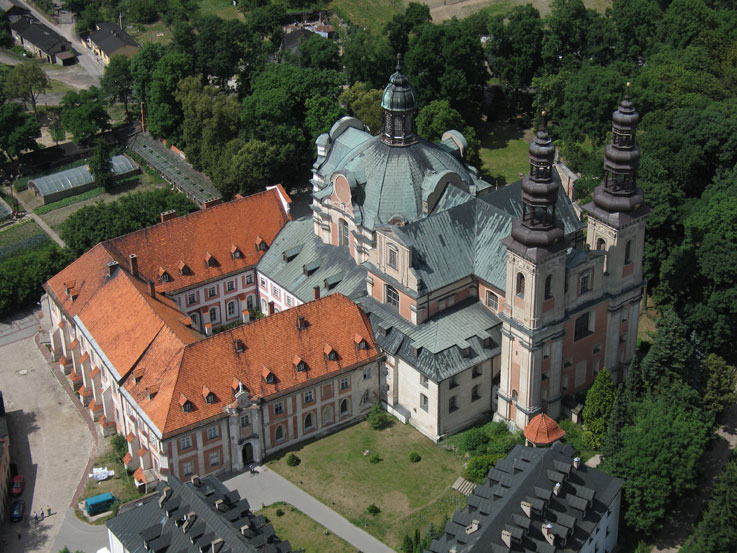
- Aerial view

- Location within Poland

Monastery information
- Order: Cistercians
- Established: 1145

People
- Founder: Mieszko III the Old

Architecture
- Style: Baroque

Site
- Location: Ląd
- Country: Poland
- Coordinates: 52°12′22″N 17°53′41″E

Historic Monument of Poland
- Designated: 2009-06-17
- Reference no.: Dz. U. z 2009 r. Nr 104, poz. 861

Ląd Abbey is a former Cistercian monastery in Ląd, Poland. It currently houses a seminary, the Higher Seminary of the Salesian Society, run by the Salesian order. On 1 July 2009, Ląd Abbey was designated an official Polish Historic Monument.

Within the old monastery grounds is the Church of the Blessed Virgin Mary and Saint Nicholas. Pope Leo XIV elevated it to a minor basilica, through a decree dated 12 September 2026 from the Dicastery for Divine Worship and the Discipline of the Sacraments, issued for the Archdiocese of Gniezno.

== History ==
=== Cistercians ===
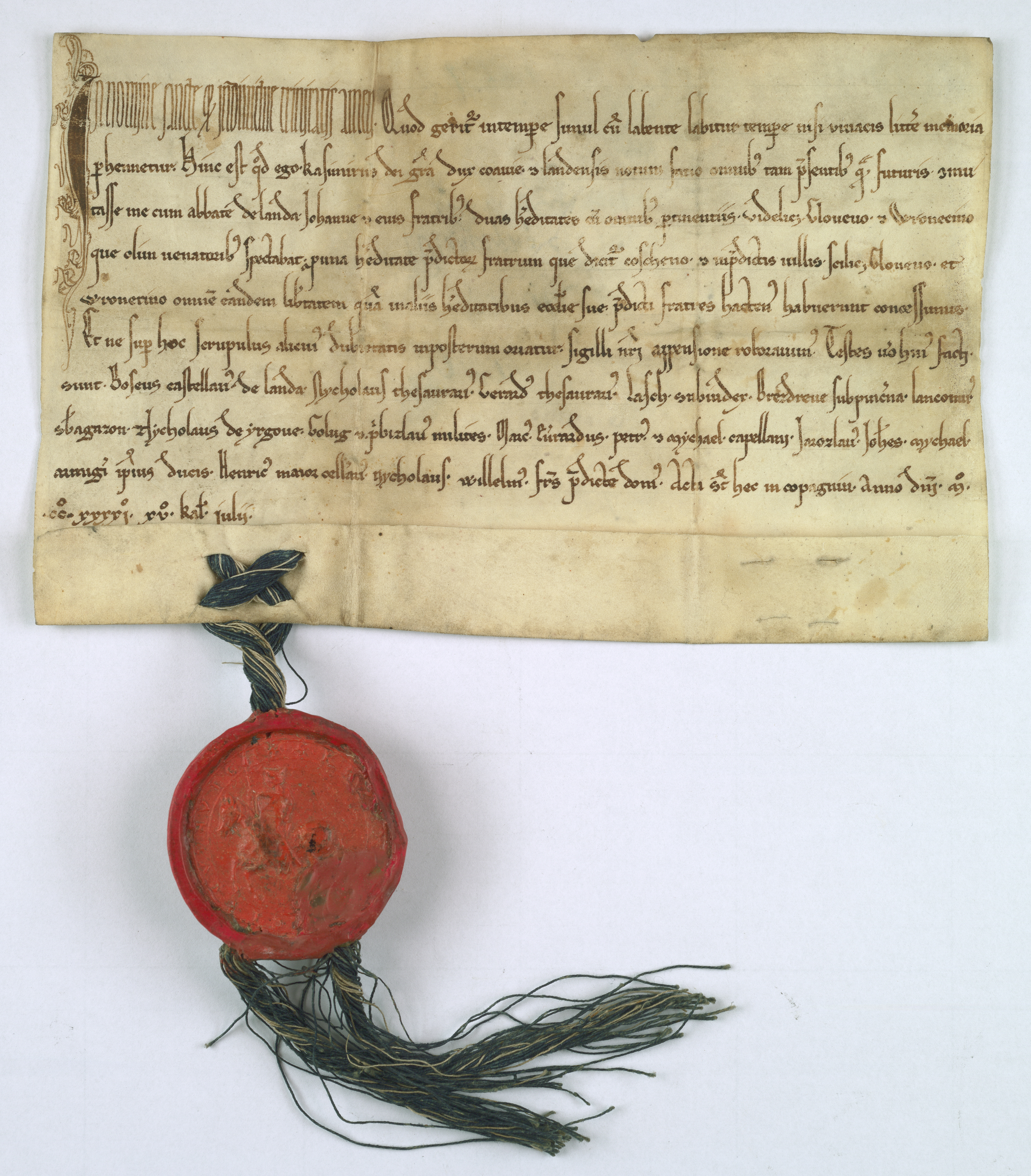
A charter dated 17 June 1241, in which Duke Casimir I of Kuyavia gives to abbot Jan and the Cistercian monastery of Ląd the villages of Głowiew and Wrąbczyn and confirms upon both villages the same immunities that he had given to other villages belonging to the monastery

According to tradition, the Cistercian monastery of Ląd was founded around 1145 and was one of the seven daughter houses of Altenberg Abbey near Cologne. Monks continued to be recruited from the Rhineland into the sixteenth century.

Around 1300, the monastery possessed 30 villages. In 1331 the monastery was sacked by the Teutonic Knights, perhaps in retaliation for the abbey's support of Poland in the conflict between them and the Order. The monastery grew through the fourteenth and fifteenth centuries, and by 1500 possessed 52 villages and 3 towns, including Zagórów.

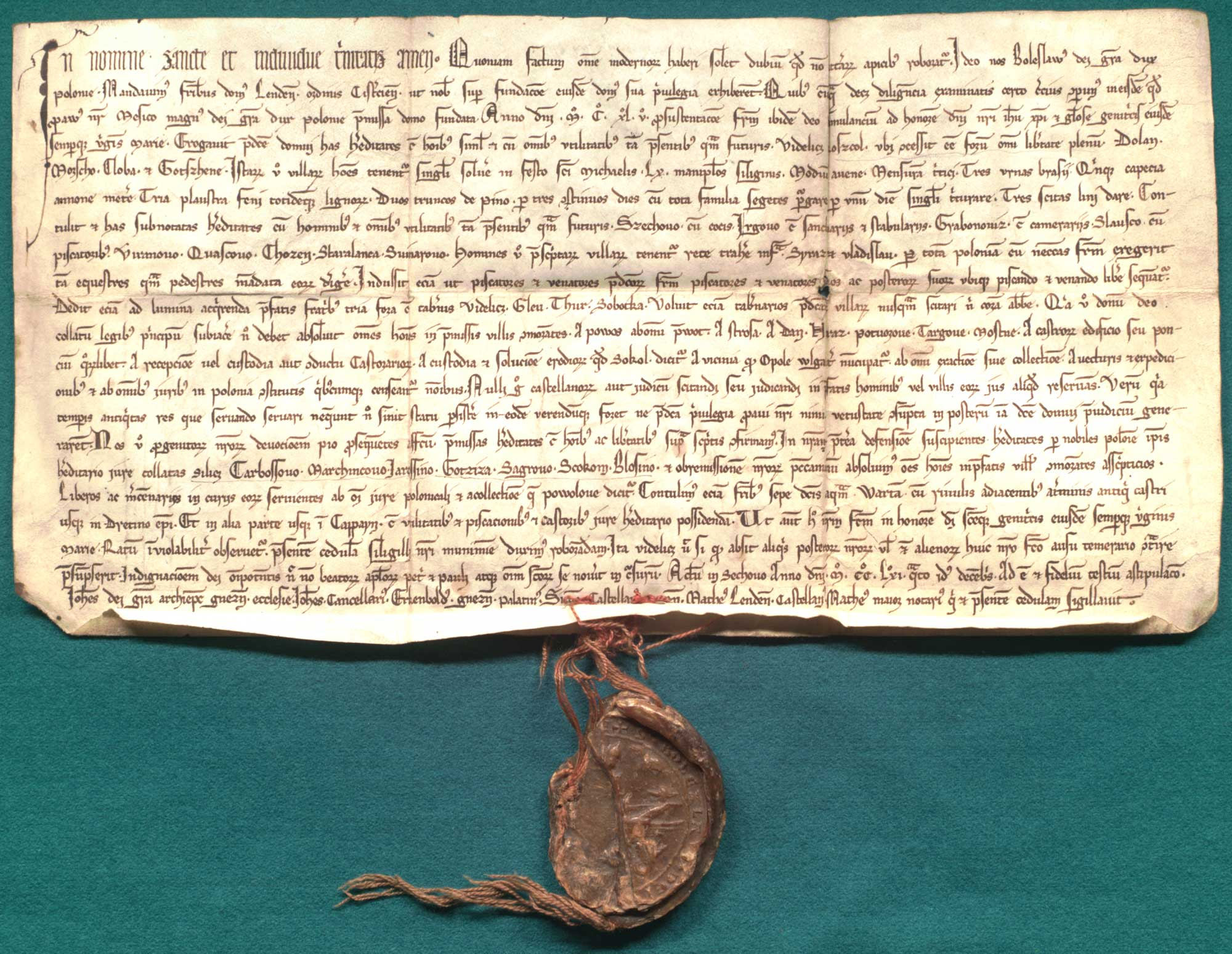
Charter dated 10 December 1261, in which Duke Bolesław V the Chaste confirms the earlier privileges given to the monastery by Mieszko III the Old in 1145

In 1511 a ruling in the Sejm allowed Polish monks to enter the abbey. By 1538, the rules required the abbot to come from a Polish noble family. After the election of the Polish monk Jan Wysocki to the abbacy, the German Cistercians left the abbey for Henryków Abbey in Silesia.

In 1651, Abbot Jan Zapolski initiated a Baroque rebuilding of the church, which is the structure that remains to this day. The abbey flourished in 1697–1750 under the abbacy of Antoni Mikołaj Łukomski, a philosopher and patron of art and learning. However, the abbey began to decline at the turn of the eighteenth century. Many possessions were sold off, and in 1796, the abbey saw most of its land holdings confiscated for an annual cash payment by the government of the Prussia, which annexed the village in the Second Partition of Poland in 1793. Shifting borders saw Ląd return to Polish rule under the short-lived Duchy of Warsaw in 1807, and then in 1815 pass under the Russian Partition, which dissolved the monastery in 1819. The last monks remained at the abbey until 1848.

=== Capuchins ===
In 1822 the monastery was acquired by Count Wacław Gutakowski, who arranged for the abbey to pass to Capuchins from Warsaw and for the restoration and furnishing of both the church and cloister. The Capuchin cloister was closed by the Tsar in 1864 as part of the retribution after the January Uprising.

=== Salesians ===
Following World War I, in 1918, Poland regained independence and control of the village. Since 1921 Ląd Abbey has been operated and maintained by the Salesian order and houses a seminary of that order. During the occupation of Poland in World War II, the Salesians were forced to evacuate the cloister and the church was shuttered. From 1939 to 1941, the abbey was used as a transitional prison for priests, primarily from the Diocese of Włocławek (see: Nazi persecution of the Catholic Church in Poland). After the prison was closed, the cloister served for a time as a camp for the Hitlerjugend.

The Salesians returned after the war and reopened the seminary. In 1952, the Communist government forced the closing of the lower seminary, and Ląd became the home of a high seminary, the Wyższego Seminarium Duchownego Towarzystwa Salezjańskiego.

In 1972, a major program of renovation and reconstruction was begun. In 2009, the former Cistercian monastery was added to the List of Historical Monuments in Poland.

== See also ==
- 18th-century Western domes
- Collectarium of Ląd

== Gallery ==
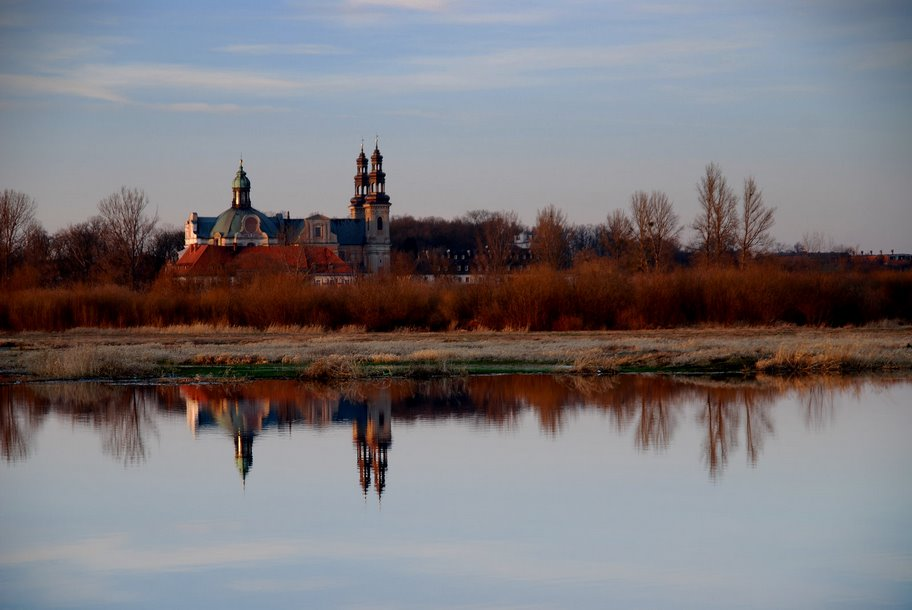
View from the Warta

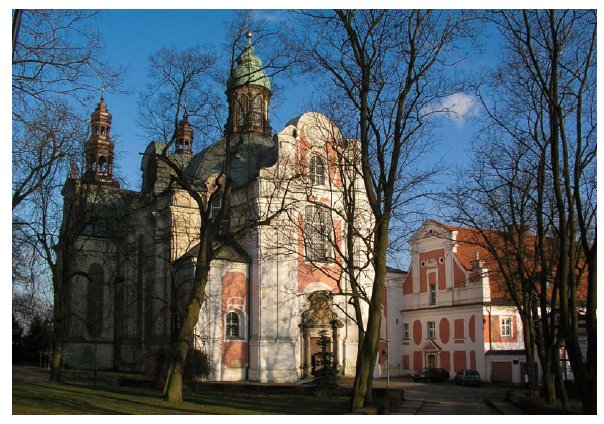
View from the west

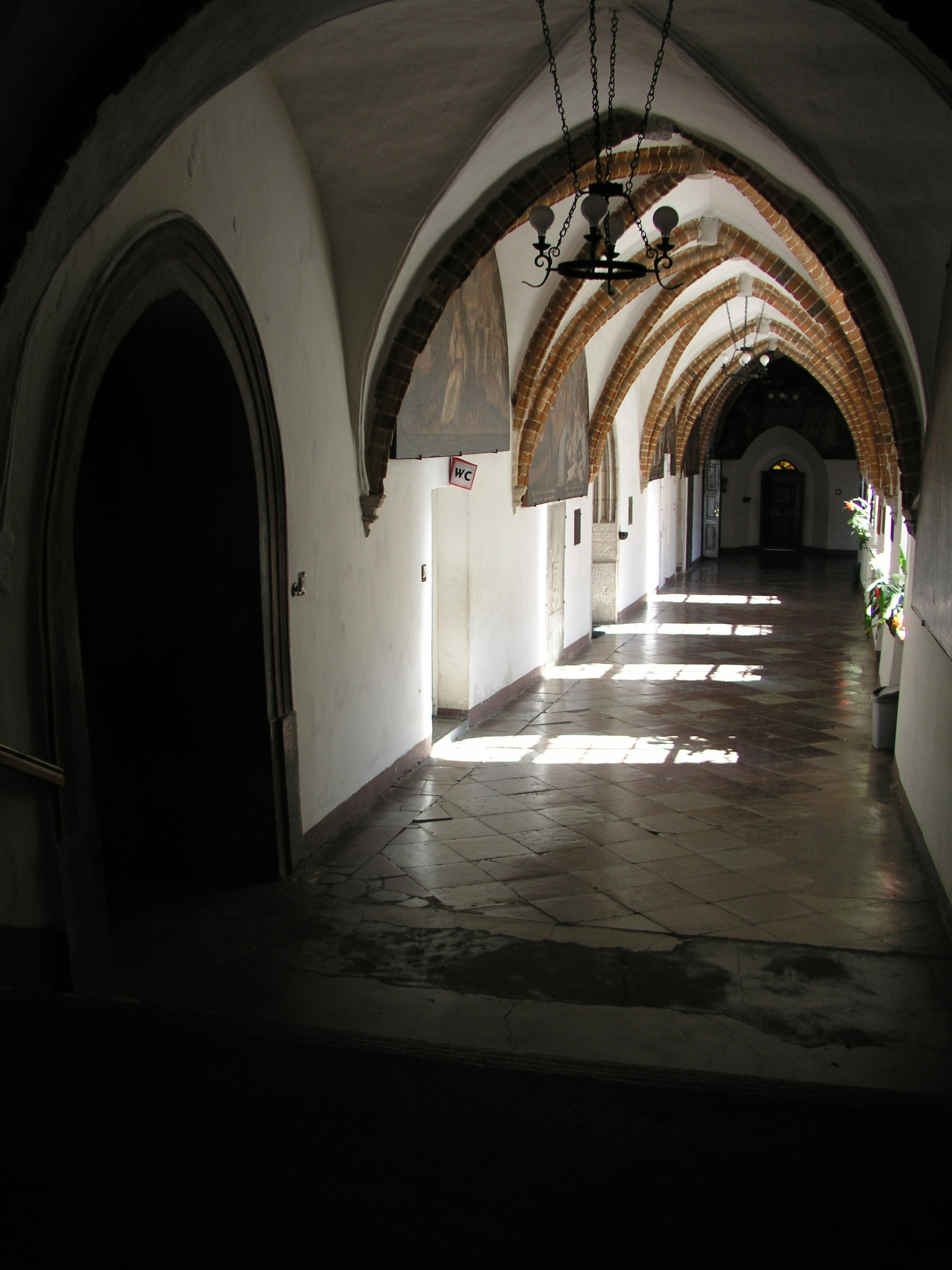
Eastern cloister

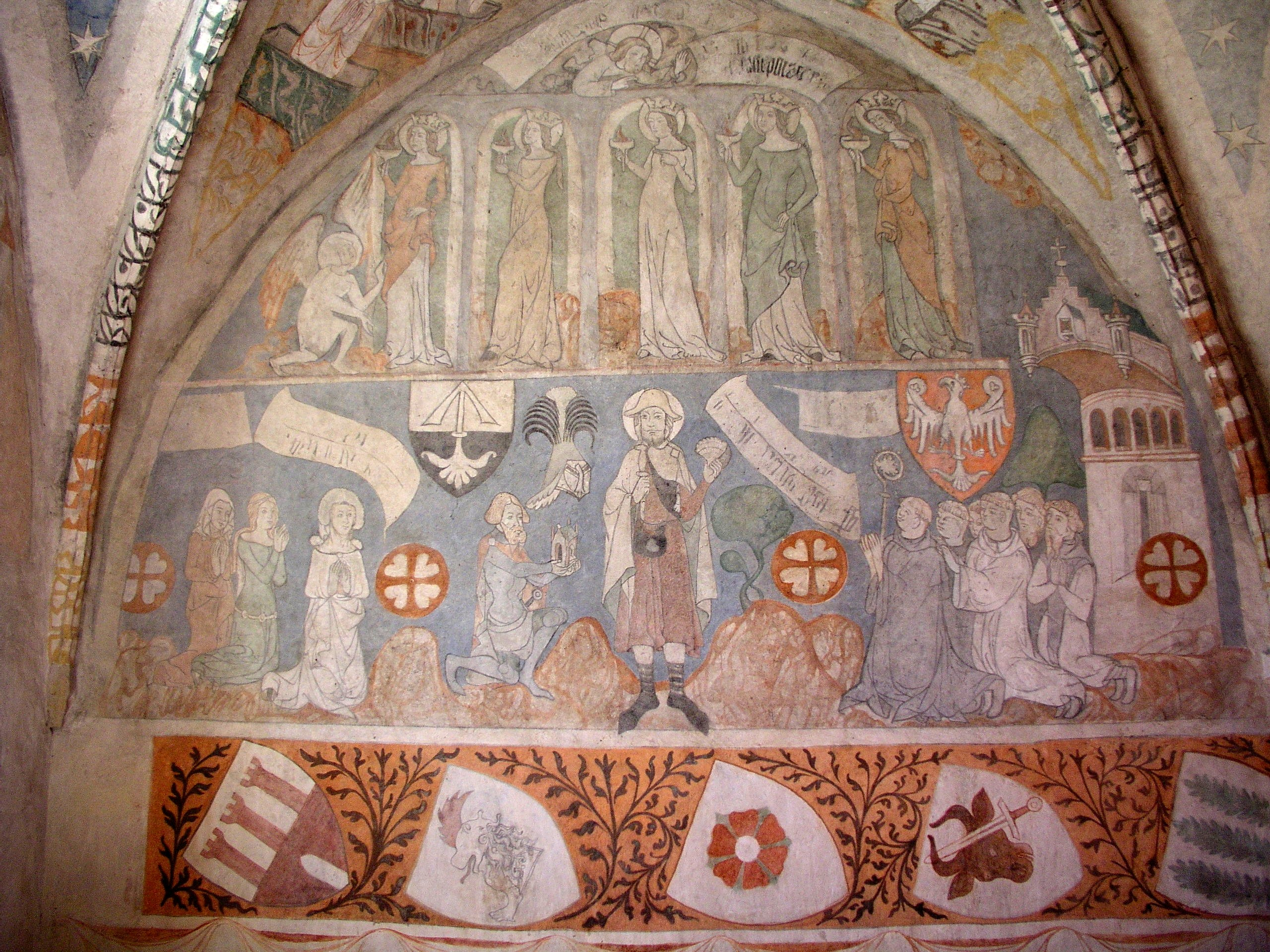
Frescos in the oratorium the Apostle James, foundation scene

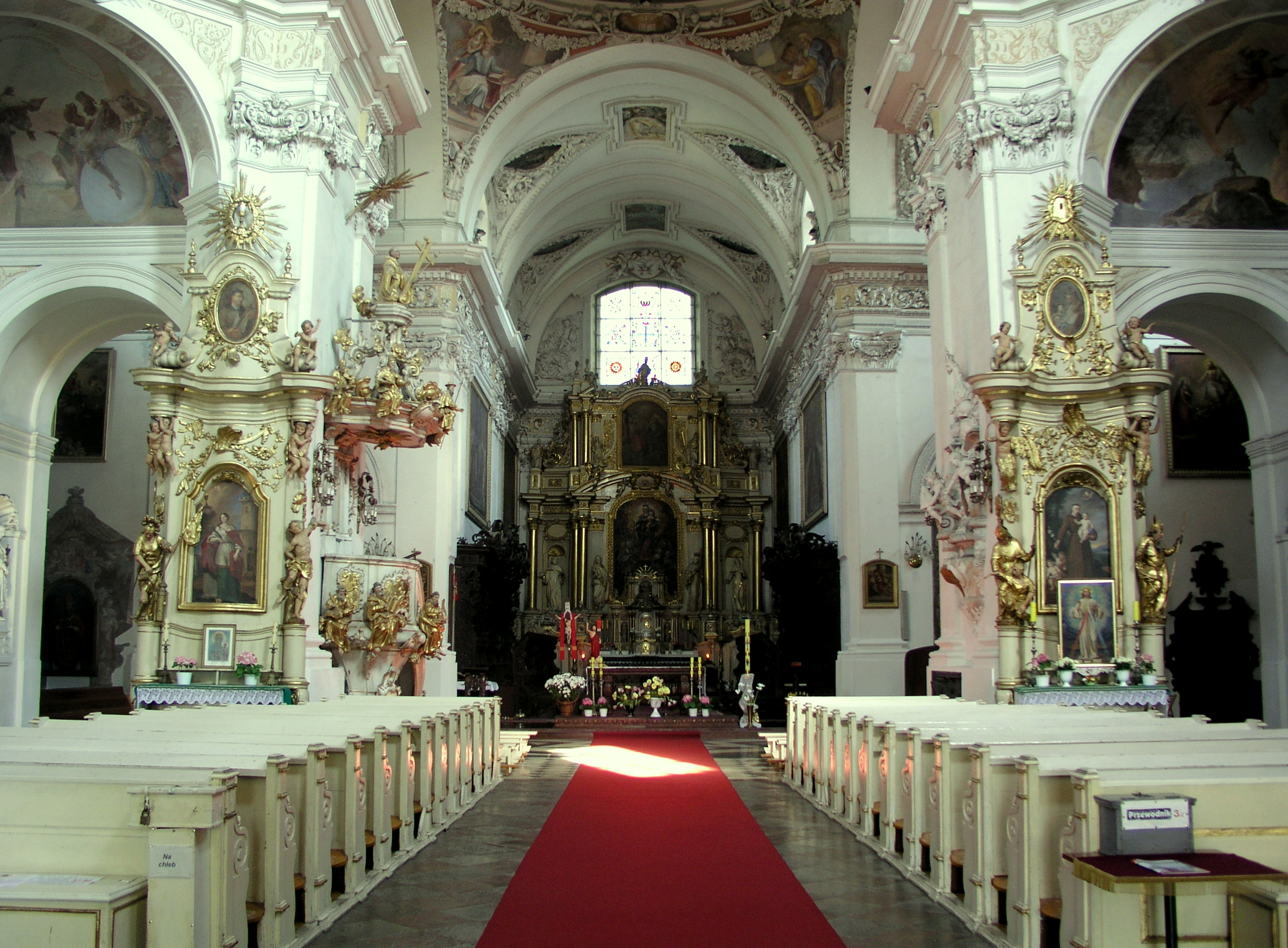
Post-Cistercian Church of the Virgin and St. Nicholas, interior

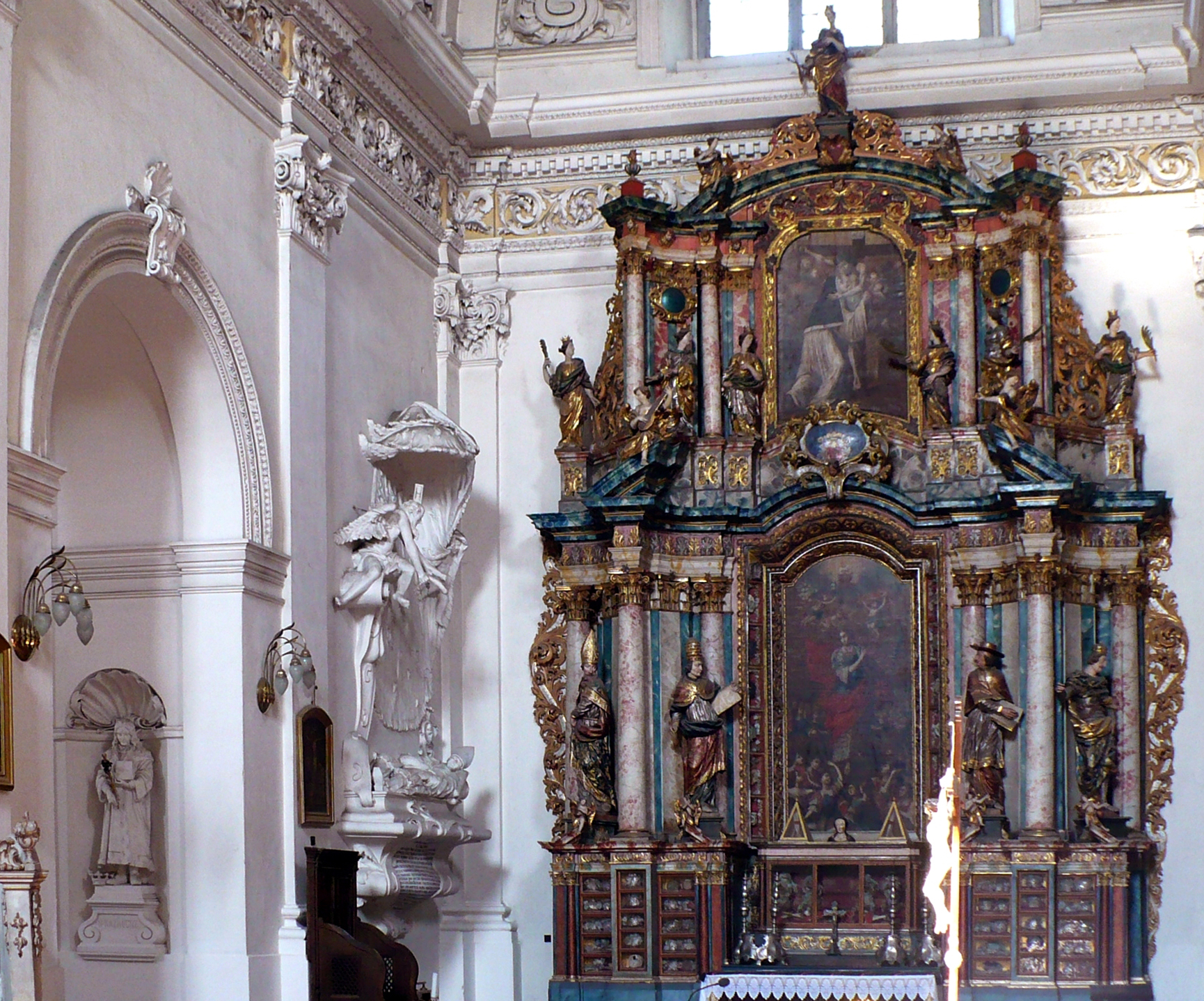
Altar-reliquary of St. Ursula and epitaph of Abbot Mikołaj Antoni Łukomski

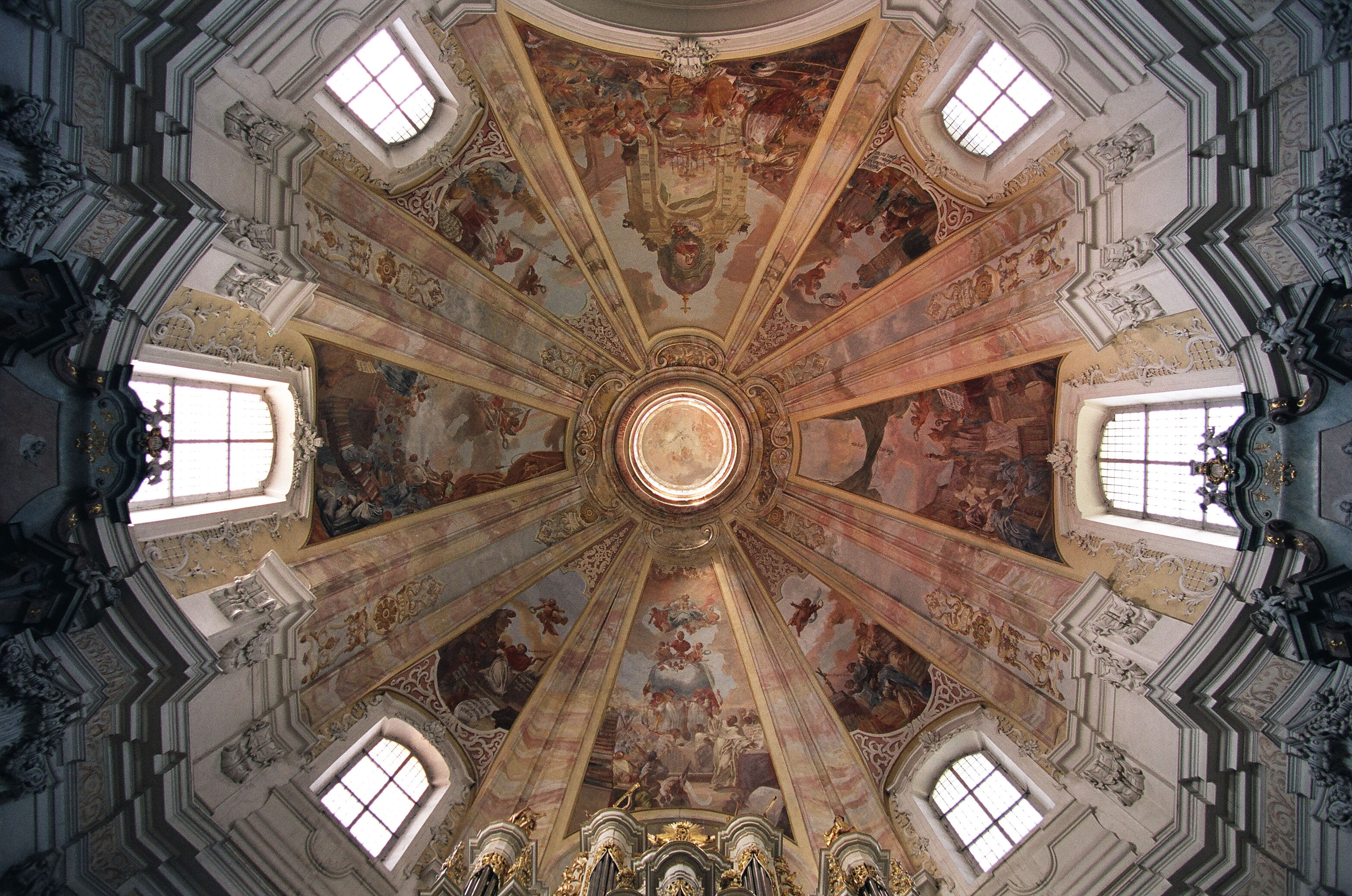
Dome by Pompeo Ferrari with frescos by Jerzy Wilhelm Neunhertz

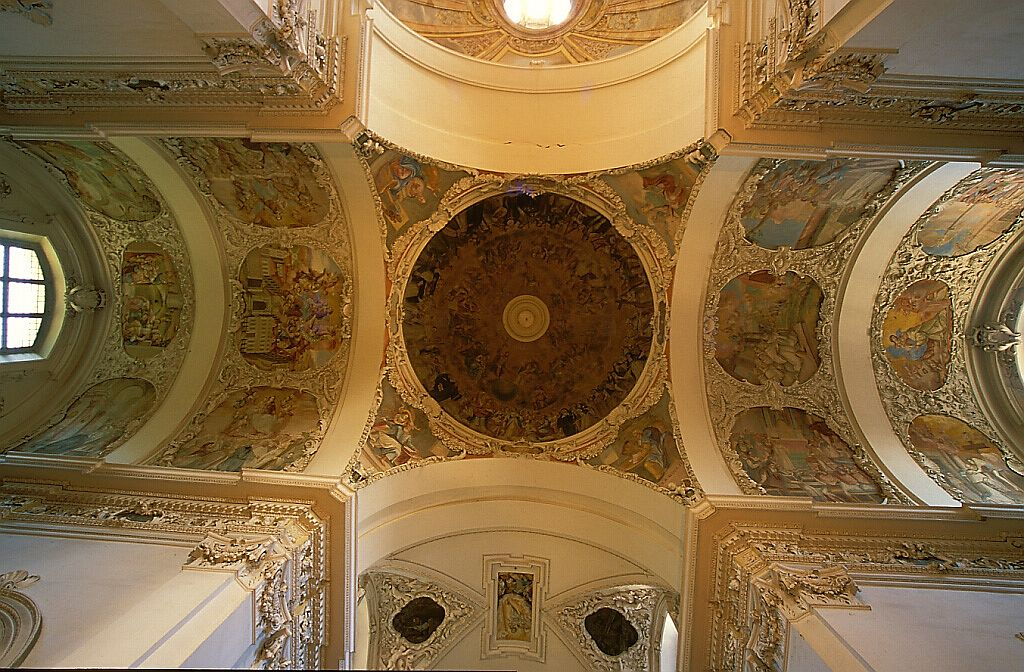
Ceiling of presbytery and transept

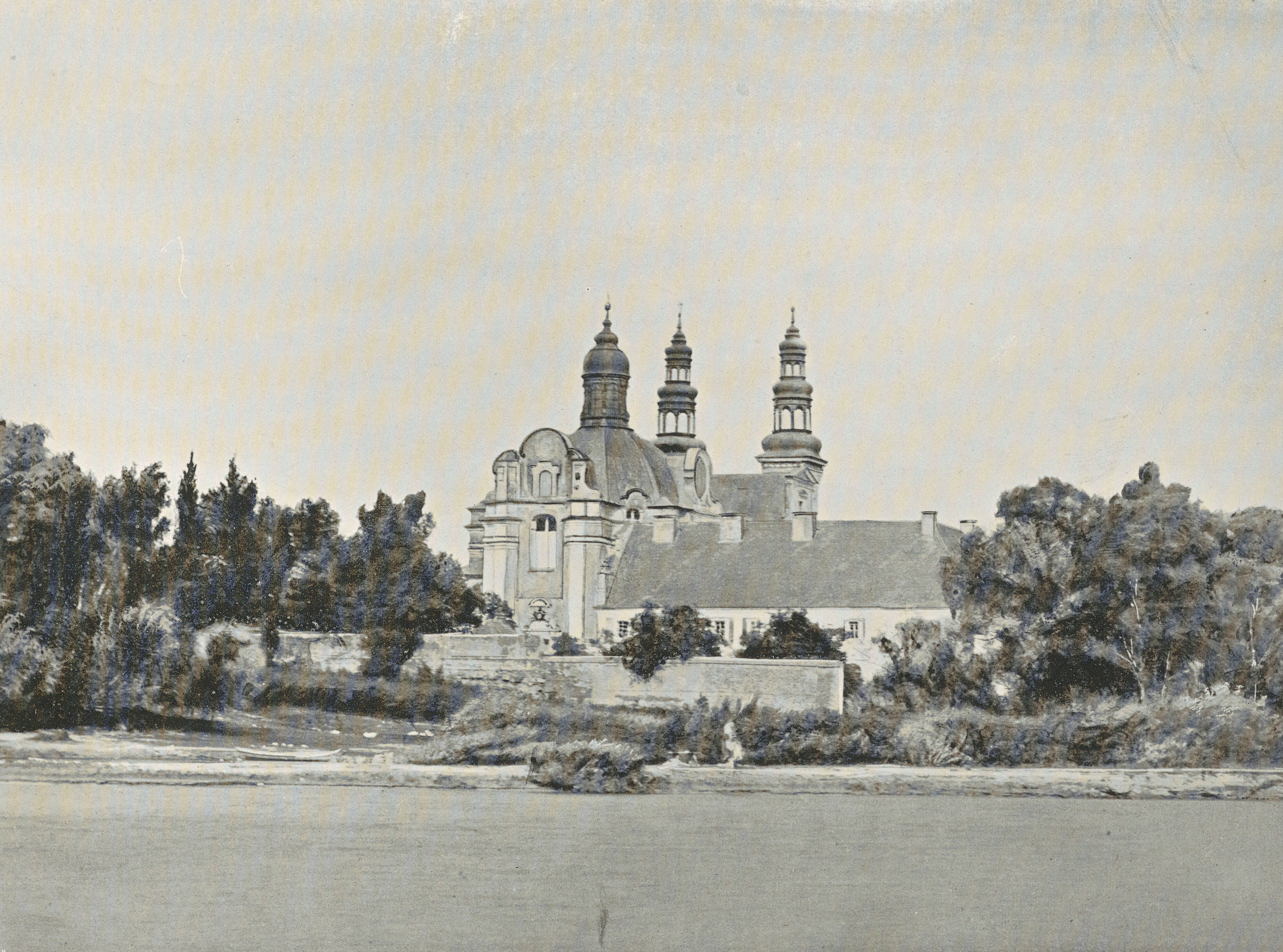
View before 1899

== Bibliography ==
- Wincenty Hipolit Gawarecki, Początek i wzrost benedyktyńsko-cystercyeńskiego zakonu, łącznie i klasztoru lendzkiego, tegoż Instytutu,w Guberni b. Kaliskiej, powiecie Konińskim położonego, „Pamiętnik Religijno-Moralny” t. X, 1846.
- Wiadomość historyczna o opactwie i kościele w Lędzie, „Pamiętnik Religijno-moralny” 17 (1858) nr 1.
- Mikołaj Kamiński, Dawne opactwo zakonu cysterskiego w Lądzie nad Wartą. Zarys dziejów i zabytki sztuki, Ląd 1936.
- Jerzy Domasłowski, Kościół i klasztor w Lądzie, Warszawa – Poznań, Państwowe Wydawnictwo Naukowe, 1981, ISBN 83-01-03075-5.
- Ląd na Wartą. Zabytkowy zespół klasztorny, tekst J. Nowiński, [Rzym-Piła], [1983], ISBN 83-908014-8-5.
- Janusz Nowiński, Polichromia prezbiterium i transeptu pocysterskiego kościoła w Lądzie nad Wartą, "Saeculum Christianum " 1, 1994, nr 1.
- Janusz Nowiński, Nieznane ołtarze Mistrza z Lubiąża, czyli Ernesta Brogera, w pocycterskim kościele w Lądzie nad Wartą, „Saeculum Christianum” 3 (1996) nr 2.
- Janusz Nowiński, Ląd nad Wartą, pocysterski zespół klasztorny, klejnot sztuki Wielkopolski, Warszawa 2007, ISBN 978-83-924446-1-9.
- Janusz Nowiński, Nagrobek opata-mecenasa Mikołaja Antoniego Łukomskiego w pocysterskim kościele w Lądzie nad Wartą, „Biuletyn Historii Sztuki” 2008 nr 3/4.
- Janusz Nowiński, Ogrody dawnego założenia cysterskiego w Lądzie nad Wartą – historia oraz współczesna koncepcja ich rewaloryzacji i rewitalizacji, „Seminare”, 2009, t. 26, s. 351–374,
- Janusz Nowiński, Ołtarz Matki Bożej Częstochowskiej i powstańcza mogiła – dwie pamiątki patriotyczne w dawnym opactwie w Lądzie nad Wartą, „Seminare”, 2009, nr 26, s. 325–340.
- Janusz Nowiński, Opactwo w Lądzie, widok od strony Warty” – nieznany pejzaż Marcina Zaleskiego, „Biuletyn Historii Sztuki”, 2009, nr 1–2, s. 205–212.
- Janusz Nowiński, Relikwie Undecim Millium Virginum w pocysterskim kościele w Lądzie nad Wartą i dedykowany im ołtarz-relikwiarz Św. Urszuli, „Seminare” 2010, t. 28, s. 253–272.
- Janusz Nowiński, Malowidła Łukasza Raedtke, freskanta 1 poł. XVIII w., w pocysterskim kościele w Lądzie nad Wartą, „Biuletyn Historii Sztuki” 2010, nr 1–2, s. 149–171.
- Janusz Nowiński, Portret opata-mecenasa Mikołaja Antoniego Łukomskiego, pędzla Józefa Rajeckiego, i rama jemu dedykowana, w: Architektura znaczeń. Studia ofiarowane prof. Zbigniewowi Bani w 65. rocznicę urodzin i 40-lecie pracy dydaktycznej, Warszawa 2011, s. 318–337.
- Janusz Nowiński, Od spustoszenia i ruiny do Pomnika Historii – salezjanie w trosce o Ląd i jego zabytki w latach 1921-2011, w: Salezjanie w Lądzie 1921–2011, red. J. Nowiński, Warszawa-Ląd 2011, s. 54–71.
- Janusz Nowiński, „Żelaza lane” z XVIII i XIX w. w dawnym opactwie cysterskim w Lądzie nad Wartą, w: Dawne i nowsze odlewnictwo w Polsce – wyroby żeliwne i inne, red. Katarzyna Kluczwajd, Toruń 2011, s. 19–30.
- Andrzej M. Wyrwa, Procesy fundacyjne wielkopolskich klasztorów cysterskich linii altenberskiej. Łekno, Ląd, Obra, Poznań 1995
- A.M. Wyrwa, Opactwo cysterskie w Lądzie nad Wartą. Wstępne, sondażowe badania wykopaliskowe w 2006 roku, Architektus nr 23,1(2008), s. 41-53
- Andrzej M. Wyrwa, Klasztor pocysterski w Lądzie nad Wartą. Zarys historii budowy, stan badań archeologiczno-architektonicznych i wstępne wyniki sondażowych badań wykopaliskowych w 2006 roku (stan. L11 – wirydarz), Fontes Archaeologici Posnanienses, t. 44, Poznań 2008, s. 143-184
- Andrzej M. Wyrwa, Zakon cystersów i jego klasztor w Lądzie. Wybrane problemy z dziejów, w: Ląd nad Wartą. Dziedzictwo kultury słowiańskiej i cysterskiej, red. M. Brzostowicz, H. Mizerska, J. Wrzesiński, Poznań-Ląd 2005, s. 61-99
- Monasticon Cisterciense Poloniae, red. A.M. Wyrwa, J. Strzelczyk, K. Kaczmarek, t.1. Dzieje i kultura męskich klasztorów cysterskich na ziemiach polskich i dawnej Rzeczypospolitej od średniowiecza do czasów współczesnych, Poznań 1999, t. 2. Katalog męskich klasztorów cysterskich na ziemiach polskich i dawnej Rzeczypospolitej, Poznań 1999 - A. M. Wyrwa, Ląd, w: Monasticon Cisterciense Poloniae (...), Poznań 1999, t. II, s. 189–201,ryc. 122-136
- Andrzej M. Wyrwa, Die „kölnischen Klöster” der Altenberger Linie in GroBpolen”. Die Frage der nationalen Exklusivität der Zisterzienserabteien in Lekno Wągrowiec (Lekno-Wongrowitz), Ląd, (Lond) und Obra, Analecta Cisterciensia 54(2002), z. 1–2, s.186-216
- Andrzej M. Wyrwa, Die Frage der nationalen Exklusivitat der Zisterzienserabteien in Łekno-Wągrowiec (Lekno-Wongrowitz), Ląd (Lond) und Obra, Altenberger Blätter, H. 10, Dezember 2000, s. 28-51
