= Papyrus Oxyrhynchus 213 =

Greek papyrus fragment

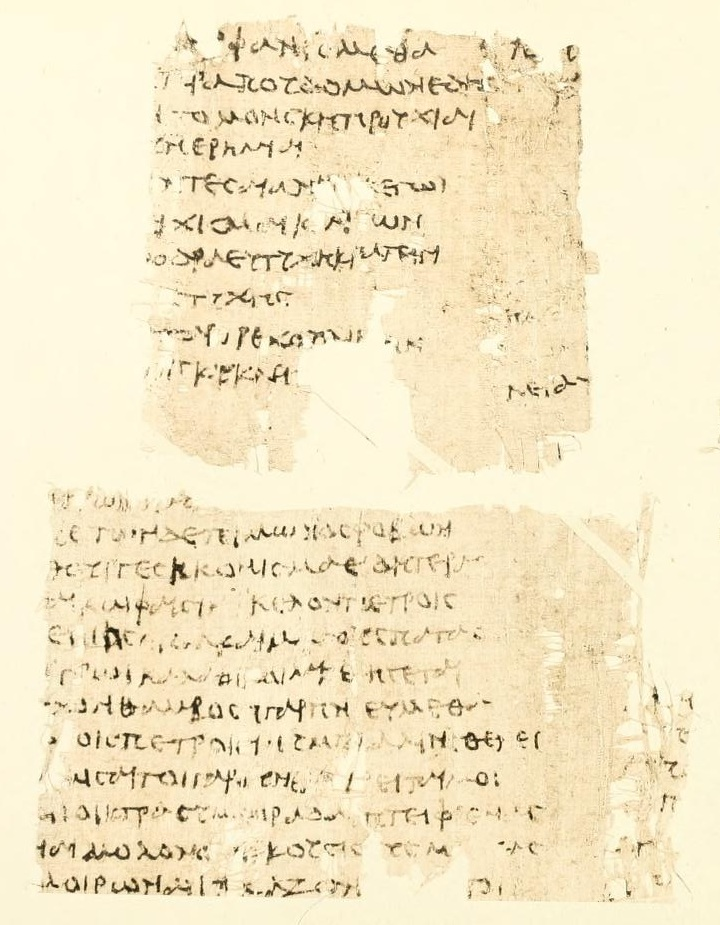
P. Oxy. 213

Papyrus Oxyrhynchus 213 (P. Oxy. 213 or P. Oxy. II 213) consists of two fragments of a tragedy by an unknown author, written in Greek. It was discovered in Oxyrhynchus. The manuscript was written on papyrus in the form of a roll. It is dated to the second century. Currently it is housed in the British Library (Department of Manuscripts, 34) in London.

== Description ==
The document was written by an unknown copyist, although the roughness of the hand suggests that the scribe was a student. The measurements of "fragment a" are 80 by 113 mm and of "fragment b" 78 by 80 mm. The text is written in a large round upright uncial hand. The verso side of the papyrus contains a list of names and amounts of money.

It was discovered by Grenfell and Hunt in 1897 in Oxyrhynchus. The text was published by Grenfell and Hunt in 1899.

== See also ==
- Oxyrhynchus Papyri
- Papyrus Oxyrhynchus 212
- Papyrus Oxyrhynchus 214
