= Papyrus Oxyrhynchus 212 =

Greek papyrus fragment

Papyrus Oxyrhynchus 212 (P. Oxy. 212 or P. Oxy. II 212) consists of three fragments of a comedy of Aristophanes, written in Greek. It was discovered in Oxyrhynchus. The manuscript was written on papyrus in the form of a roll. It is dated to the first or second century. Currently it is housed in the British Library (Department of Manuscripts, 782) in London.

== Description ==
The document was written by an unknown copyist. The measurements of the fragment are 219 by 116 mm. The text is written in a large round upright uncial hand. There is a tendency to separate words.

The hands of two correctors may be distinguished.

It was discovered by Grenfell and Hunt in 1897 in Oxyrhynchus, together with a large number of documents dated in the reigns of Vespasian, Domitian, and Trajan. The text was published by Grenfell and Hunt in 1899.

== See also ==
- Oxyrhynchus Papyri
- Papyrus Oxyrhynchus 211
- Papyrus Oxyrhynchus 213
