= Papyrus Oxyrhynchus 215 =

Greek papyrus fragment

Papyrus Oxyrhynchus 215 (P. Oxy. 215 or P. Oxy. II 215) is a philosophical fragment by an unknown author, written in Greek. It was discovered in Oxyrhynchus. The manuscript was written on papyrus in the form of a roll. It is dated to the first century BC or first century AD. Currently it is housed in the British Library (Department of Manuscripts, 1182) in London.

== Description ==
The document was written by an unknown copyist. The measurements of the fragment are 232 by 183 mm. The text is written in an irregular uncial hand; letter epsilon tends to be very large, xi is written with three separate strokes.

The author was probably an Epicurean philosopher, possibly, according to Grenfell and Hunt, Epicurus himself. The subject of the text is the popular idea of religion and fear of the gods, which the author is opposed to.

It was discovered by Grenfell and Hunt in 1897 in Oxyrhynchus. The text was published by Grenfell and Hunt in 1899.

== See also ==
- Oxyrhynchus Papyri
- Papyrus Oxyrhynchus 214
- Papyrus Oxyrhynchus 216
