= W. Head & Sister =

American photographic studio

The firm of W. Head & Sister, also known as Head & Sister, was a photographic studio in Dows, Iowa, United States, circa 1885 (141 years ago).

The forename of W. Head and his sister are unknown.

Two extant cabinet photographs from the studio exist in the Peter Palmquist Collection of Women in Photography at the Beinecke Rare Book and Manuscript Library at Yale University, New Haven, Connecticut.
