= Papyrus Oxyrhynchus 221 =

Greek papyrus fragment

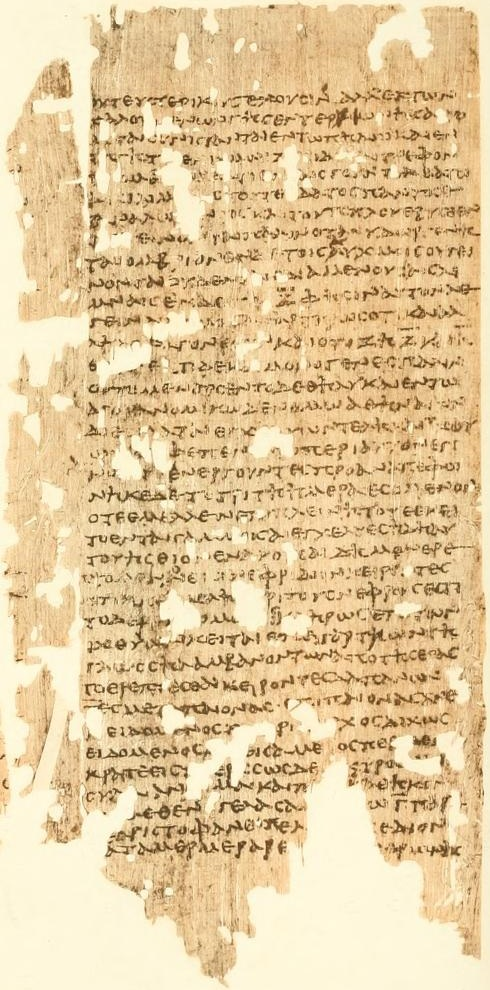
P. Oxy. 221

Papyrus Oxyrhynchus 221 (P. Oxy. 221 or P. Oxy. II 221) contains Homeric scholia by an unknown author, written in Greek. It was discovered in Oxyrhynchus, Egypt. The manuscript was written on papyrus in the form of a roll. It is dated to the second century. Frederic G. Kenyon dated it to the first century or the first half of the second century. Currently it is housed in the British Library (Department of Manuscripts, 1184) in London.

== Description ==
The document was written by an unknown copyist. The verso side contains Homeric scholia on the 21st book of the Iliad. The recto side is known as Papyrus Oxyrhynchus 220. The text is written in an informal uncial hand. It uses points, breathing, and accents sparingly; iota and upsilon sometimes have diaeresis. There are a large number of corrections, many of which were made by the original scribe. There is a note in cursive added above margin of column XVIII; there is a signature in semi-cursive hand between columns X and XI.

It was discovered by Grenfell and Hunt in 1897 in Oxyrhynchus. The text was published by Grenfell and Hunt in 1899.

== Significance ==
This papyrus was unique at the time of its discovery in being datable by both physical evidence and textual evidence. Thus, Grenfell and Hunt state that "we have here for the first time an almost contemporary specimen of a first century commentary on the Iliad." The point, then, is that the quotations from Homer in the text must accurately reflect the state of available manuscripts of the Iliad in the first century, unlike previously known collections of scholia, whose manuscripts were copied many centuries after the texts were written, which makes it impossible to know whether the Homeric quotations were corrupt.

Furthermore, the papyrus contains a number of previously unknown quotations from ancient Greek authors, including Hesiod, Pindar, Alcaeus, Sophocles, and Aristotle.

== See also ==
- Oxyrhynchus Papyri
- Papyrus Oxyrhynchus 220
- Papyrus Oxyrhynchus 223
