= General Roman Calendar =

General liturgical calendar of the Roman rite of the Catholic Church

The General Roman Calendar (GRC) is the liturgical calendar in the Roman Rite of the Catholic Church. It indicates the dates of celebrations of saints and mysteries of Jesus according to Christianity wherever this liturgical rite is in use. Some celebrations are a fixed annual date, or occur on a particular day of the week, for example the Feast of the Baptism of the Lord in January and the Feast of Christ the King in November. Other dates relate to the date of Easter, such as the celebrations of the Sacred Heart of Jesus and the Immaculate Heart of Mary.

== Description ==
National and diocesan calendars, including that of the Diocese of Rome itself as well as the calendars of religious institutes and even of continents, add other saints and mysteries or transfer the celebration of a particular saint or mystery from the date assigned in the General Calendar to another date.

These liturgical calendars indicate the degree or rank of each celebration: memorial (which can be optional), feast, or solemnity. Among other differences, the Gloria is said or sung at the Mass of a feast but not at that of a memorial. The Nicene Creed is added on solemnities.

The last general revision of the General Roman Calendar was in 1969 and was authorized by the motu proprio of Pope Paul VI, Mysterii Paschalis. The motu proprio and the decree of promulgation were included in the book Calendarium Romanum, published in the same year by Libreria Editrice Vaticana. This contained the official document Universal Norms on the Liturgical Year and the Calendar, and the list of celebrations of the General Roman Calendar. Both these documents are printed, in their present revised form, in the Roman Missal, after the General Instruction of the Roman Missal.

== Selection of saints included ==
Saints included in General Roman Calendar are a selection of canonized saints. All canonized saints' names are added to the Roman Martyrology.

There is a common misconception that for certain saints (e.g., Christopher), veneration was "suppressed" as part of changes by the Second Vatican Council. In fact, those saints remain recognized, being listed as martyrs in the Roman Martyrology or celebrated in regional calendars. In 1969, in Mysterii Paschalis, Pope Paul VI wrote, with reference to Saint Christopher, that the Acts of Saint Christopher are legendary, despite attestations to the veneration of the martyr dating from ancient times. His changes to the calendar of saints included "leaving the memorial of Saint Christopher to local calendars", because of the relatively late date of its addition to what was then the Tridentine calendar.

== Liturgical year ==
In the liturgical books, the document General Roman Calendar, which lists fixed celebrations and some moveable ones, is printed immediately after the document Universal Norms on the Liturgical Year and the Calendar, which states that "throughout the course of the year the Church unfolds the entire mystery of Christ and observes the birthdays of the Saints". Certain mysteries of Christ are celebrated on dates that vary from year to year.

The Catholic Church's year combines two cycles of liturgical celebrations. One is called the Proper of Time or Temporale, associated with the moveable date of Easter and the fixed date of Christmas. The other is associated with fixed calendar dates and is called the Proper of Saints or Sanctorale. The General Roman Calendar includes celebrations that belong to the Proper of Time or Temporale as well as Proper of Saints or Sanctorale. An instance where two observances occur on the same date is called an occurrence.

== Transfer of celebrations ==
Some celebrations listed in the General Roman Calendar are transferred to another date:

For the pastoral advantage of the people, it is permissible to observe on the Sundays in Ordinary Time those celebrations that fall during the week and have special appeal to the devotion of the faithful, provided the celebrations take precedence over these Sundays in the Table of Liturgical Days.

== List of celebrations inscribed in the GRC ==
This list contains all celebrations currently inscribed in the General Roman Calendar. It is updated whenever the pope makes changes to the celebrations in the General Roman Calendar.

When no citation is provided for a particular celebration, it comes from Calendarium Romanum Generale (General Roman Calendar) as printed in the Latin original of Roman Missal, ed. typ. tertia (reimpressio emendata), released in 2008. Celebrations that are added or changed are cited from official decrees.

Celebration names are used from English Roman Missal (2018).

=== January ===
- 1 January: Solemnity of Mary, the Holy Mother of God – solemnity
- 2 January: Saints Basil the Great and Gregory Nazianzen, Bishops and Doctors of the Church – memorial
- 3 January: The Most Holy Name of Jesus – optional memorial
- 6 January: The Epiphany of the Lord – solemnity^{a}
- 7 January: Saint Raymond of Penyafort, Priest – optional memorial
- 13 January: Saint Hilary, Bishop and Doctor of the Church – optional memorial
- 17 January: Saint Anthony, Abbot – memorial
- 20 January: Saint Fabian, Pope and Martyr – optional memorial
- 20 January: Saint Sebastian, Martyr – optional memorial
- 21 January: Saint Agnes, Virgin and Martyr – memorial
- 22 January: Saint Vincent, Deacon and Martyr – optional memorial
- 24 January: Saint Francis de Sales, Bishop and Doctor of the Church – memorial
- 25 January: The Conversion of Saint Paul the Apostle – feast
- 26 January: Saints Timothy and Titus, Bishops – memorial
- 27 January: Saint Angela Merici, Virgin – optional memorial
- 28 January: Saint Thomas Aquinas, Priest and Doctor of the Church – memorial
- 31 January: Saint John Bosco, Priest – memorial
- Sunday after 6 January: The Baptism of the Lord – feast^{b}

^a The solemnity of the Epiphany of the Lord is always celebrated on 6 January in the General Roman Calendar, however, in particular calendars, it might be transferred to Sunday before, on or after 6 January.
^b When the solemnity of the Epiphany of the Lord is transferred to Sunday, which occurs on 7 or 8 January, the feast of the Baptism of the Lord is celebrated on the following Monday. (Ubi sollemnitas Epiphaniæ ad dominicam transfertur, quæ die 7 vel 8 ianuarii occurrit, festum Baptismatis Domini celebratur feria secunda sequenti.)

=== February ===
- 2 February: The Presentation of the Lord – feast
- 3 February: Saint Blaise, Bishop and Martyr – optional memorial
- 3 February: Saint Ansgar, Bishop – optional memorial
- 5 February: Saint Agatha, Virgin and Martyr – memorial
- 6 February: Saints Paul Miki and Companions, Martyrs – memorial
- 8 February: Saint Jerome Emiliani, Priest – optional memorial
- 8 February: Saint Josephine Bakhita, Virgin – optional memorial
- 10 February: Saint Scholastica, Virgin – memorial
- 11 February: Our Lady of Lourdes – optional memorial
- 14 February: Saints Cyril, Monk, and Methodius, Bishop – memorial
- 17 February: The Seven Holy Founders of the Servite Order – optional memorial
- 21 February: Saint Peter Damian, Bishop and Doctor of the Church – optional memorial
- 22 February: The Chair of Saint Peter the Apostle – feast
- 23 February: Saint Polycarp, Bishop and Martyr – memorial
- 27 February: Saint Gregory of Narek, Abbot and Doctor of the Church – optional memorial^{a}

^a On 25 January 2021, Pope Francis inscribed Saint Gregory of Narek, Abbot and Doctor of the Church, in the General Roman Calendar.

=== March ===
- 4 March: Saint Casimir – optional memorial
- 7 March: Saints Perpetua and Felicity, Martyrs – memorial
- 8 March: Saint John of God, Religious – optional memorial
- 9 March: Saint Frances of Rome, Religious – optional memorial
- 17 March: Saint Patrick, Bishop – optional memorial
- 18 March: Saint Cyril of Jerusalem, Bishop and Doctor of the Church – optional memorial
- 19 March: Saint Joseph, Spouse of the Blessed Virgin Mary – solemnity
- 23 March: Saint Turibius of Mongrovejo, Bishop – optional memorial
- 25 March: The Annunciation of the Lord – solemnity

=== April ===
- 2 April: Saint Francis of Paola, Hermit – optional memorial
- 4 April: Saint Isidore, Bishop and Doctor of the Church – optional memorial
- 5 April: Saint Vincent Ferrer, Priest – optional memorial
- 7 April: Saint John Baptist de la Salle, Priest – memorial
- 11 April: Saint Stanislaus, Bishop and Martyr – memorial
- 13 April: Saint Martin I, Pope and Martyr – optional memorial
- 21 April: Saint Anselm, Bishop and Doctor of the Church – optional memorial
- 23 April: Saint George, Martyr – optional memorial
- 23 April: Saint Adalbert, Bishop and Martyr – optional memorial
- 24 April: Saint Fidelis of Sigmaringen, Priest and Martyr – optional memorial
- 25 April: Saint Mark, Evangelist – feast
- 28 April: Saint Peter Chanel, Priest and Martyr – optional memorial
- 28 April: Saint Louis Grignon de Montfort, Priest – optional memorial
- 29 April: Saint Catherine of Siena, Virgin and Doctor of the Church – memorial
- 30 April: Saint Pius V, Pope – optional memorial

=== May ===
- 1 May: Saint Joseph the Worker – optional memorial
- 2 May: Saint Athanasius, Bishop and Doctor of the Church – memorial
- 3 May: Saints Philip and James, Apostles – feast
- 10 May: Saint John of Ávila, Priest and Doctor of the Church – optional memorial^{a}
- 12 May: Saints Nereus and Achilleus, Martyrs – optional memorial
- 12 May: Saint Pancras, Martyr – optional memorial
- 13 May: Our Lady of Fatima – optional memorial
- 14 May: Saint Matthias, Apostle – feast
- 18 May: Saint John I, Pope and Martyr – optional memorial
- 20 May: Saint Bernardine of Siena, Priest – optional memorial
- 21 May: Saint Christopher Magallanes, Priest, and Companions, Martyrs – optional memorial
- 22 May: Saint Rita of Cascia, Religious – optional memorial
- 25 May: Saint Bede the Venerable, Priest and Doctor of the Church – optional memorial
- 25 May: Saint Gregory VII, Pope – optional memorial
- 25 May: Saint Mary Magdalene de’ Pazzi, Virgin – optional memorial
- 26 May: Saint Philip Neri, Priest – memorial
- 27 May: Saint Augustine of Canterbury, Bishop – optional memorial
- 29 May: Saint Paul VI, Pope – optional memorial^{b}
- 31 May: The Visitation of the Blessed Virgin Mary – feast
- Monday after Pentecost: Blessed Virgin Mary, Mother of the Church – memorial^{c}
- First Sunday after Pentecost: The Most Holy Trinity – solemnity
- Thursday after Holy Trinity:^{d} The Most Holy Body and Blood of Christ – solemnity

^a On 25 January 2021, Pope Francis inscribed Saint John of Avila, Priest and Doctor of the Church, in the General Roman Calendar.
^b On 25 January 2019, Pope Francis inscribed Saint Paul VI, Pope, in the General Roman Calendar.
^c On 11 February 2018, Pope Francis inscribed Blessed Virgin Mary, Mother of the Church, in the General Roman Calendar. In years when the memorial of the Mother of the Church coincides with another obligatory memorial, only the memorial of the Mother of the Church will be celebrated for that year.
^d The solemnity of the Most Holy Body and Blood of Christ can be transferred to the following Sunday in particular calendars.

=== June ===
- 1 June: Saint Justin, Martyr – memorial
- 2 June: Saints Marcellinus and Peter, Martyrs – optional memorial
- 3 June: Saints Charles Lwanga and Companions, Martyrs – memorial
- 5 June: Saint Boniface, Bishop and Martyr – memorial
- 6 June: Saint Norbert, Bishop – optional memorial
- 9 June: Saint Ephrem, Deacon and Doctor of the Church – optional memorial
- 11 June: Saint Barnabas, Apostle – memorial
- 13 June: Saint Anthony of Padua, Priest and Doctor of the Church – memorial
- 19 June: Saint Romuald, Abbot – optional memorial
- 21 June: Saint Aloysius Gonzaga, Religious – memorial
- 22 June: Saint Paulinus of Nola, Bishop – optional memorial
- 22 June: Saints John Fisher, Bishop, and Thomas More, Martyrs – optional memorial
- 24 June: The Nativity of Saint John the Baptist – solemnity
- 27 June: Saint Cyril of Alexandria, Bishop and Doctor of the Church – optional memorial
- 28 June: Saint Irenaeus, Bishop, Martyr and Doctor of the Church – memorial^{a}
- 29 June: Saints Peter and Paul, Apostles – solemnity
- 30 June: The First Martyrs of Holy Roman Church – optional memorial
- Friday after the Second Sunday after Pentecost: The Most Sacred Heart of Jesus – solemnity^{b}
- Saturday after the Second Sunday after Pentecost: The Immaculate Heart of the Blessed Virgin Mary – memorial^{c}

^a The title Doctor of the Church was conferred on Saint Irenaeus by Pope Francis on 21 January 2022.
^b In 2022, the solemnity of the Sacred Heart of Jesus coincided with the solemnity of the Nativity of John the Baptist. The Holy See kept the solemnity of the Sacred Heart on 24 June and brought forward the Nativity of John the Baptist to 23 June, except in locations where John the Baptist is the patron saint, where the reverse applied.
^c In years when the memorial of the Immaculate Heart of the Blessed Virgin Mary coincides with another obligatory memorial, both must be considered optional for that year.

=== July ===
- 3 July: Saint Thomas, Apostle – feast
- 4 July: Saint Elizabeth of Portugal – optional memorial
- 5 July: Saint Anthony Zaccaria, Priest – optional memorial
- 6 July: Saint Maria Goretti, Virgin and Martyr – optional memorial
- 9 July: Saint Augustine Zhao Rong, Priest, and Companions, Martyrs – optional memorial
- 11 July: Saint Benedict, Abbot – memorial
- 13 July: Saint Henry – optional memorial
- 14 July: Saint Camillus de Lellis, Priest – optional memorial
- 15 July: Saint Bonaventure, Bishop and Doctor of the Church – memorial
- 16 July: Our Lady of Mount Carmel – optional memorial
- 20 July: Saint Apollinaris, Bishop and Martyr – optional memorial
- 21 July: Saint Lawrence of Brindisi, Priest and Doctor of the Church – optional memorial
- 22 July: Saint Mary Magdalene – feast^{a}
- 23 July: Saint Bridget, Religious – optional memorial
- 24 July: Saint Sharbel Makhluf, Priest – optional memorial
- 25 July: Saint James, Apostle – feast
- 26 July: Saints Joachim and Anne, Parents of the Blessed Virgin Mary – memorial
- 29 July: Saints Martha, Mary and Lazarus – memorial^{b}
- 30 July: Saint Peter Chrysologus, Bishop and Doctor of the Church – optional memorial
- 31 July: Saint Ignatius of Loyola, Priest – memorial

^a Pope Francis raised the rank of the celebration of Saint Mary Magdalene to feast on 3 June 2016.
^b Pope Francis decreed on 26 January 2021 that Saints Mary and Lazarus of Bethany are to be celebrated alongside of Saint Martha.

=== August ===
- 1 August: Saint Alphonsus Liguori, Bishop and Doctor of the Church – memorial
- 2 August: Saint Eusebius of Vercelli, Bishop – optional memorial
- 2 August: Saint Peter Julian Eymard, Priest – optional memorial
- 4 August: Saint Jean Vianney, Priest – memorial
- 5 August: The Dedication of the Basilica of Saint Mary Major – optional memorial
- 6 August: The Transfiguration of the Lord – feast
- 7 August: Saint Sixtus II, Pope, and Companions, Martyrs – optional memorial
- 7 August: Saint Cajetan, Priest – optional memorial
- 8 August: Saint Dominic, Priest – memorial
- 9 August: Saint Teresa Benedicta of the Cross, Virgin and Martyr – optional memorial
- 10 August: Saint Lawrence, Deacon and Martyr – feast
- 11 August: Saint Clare, Virgin – memorial
- 12 August: Saint Jane Frances de Chantal, Religious – optional memorial
- 13 August: Saints Pontian, Pope, and Hippolytus, Priest, Martyrs – optional memorial
- 14 August: Saint Maximilian Kolbe, Priest and Martyr – memorial
- 15 August: The Assumption of the Blessed Virgin Mary – solemnity
- 16 August: Saint Stephen of Hungary – optional memorial
- 19 August: Saint John Eudes, Priest – optional memorial
- 20 August: Saint Bernard, Abbot and Doctor of the Church – memorial
- 21 August: Saint Pius X, Pope – memorial
- 22 August: The Queenship of the Blessed Virgin Mary – memorial
- 23 August: Saint Rose of Lima, Virgin – optional memorial
- 24 August: Saint Bartholomew, Apostle – feast
- 25 August: Saint Louis – optional memorial
- 25 August: Saint Joseph Calasanz, Priest – optional memorial
- 27 August: Saint Monica – memorial
- 28 August: Saint Augustine of Hippo, Bishop and Doctor of the Church – memorial
- 29 August: The Passion of Saint John the Baptist, Martyr – memorial

=== September ===
- 3 September: Saint Gregory the Great, Pope and Doctor of the Church – memorial
- 5 September: Saint Teresa of Calcutta, Virgin – optional memorial^{a}
- 8 September: The Nativity of the Blessed Virgin Mary – feast
- 9 September: Saint Peter Claver, Priest – optional memorial
- 12 September: The Most Holy Name of Mary – optional memorial
- 13 September: Saint John Chrysostom, Bishop and Doctor of the Church – memorial
- 14 September: The Exaltation of the Holy Cross – feast
- 15 September: Our Lady of Sorrows – memorial
- 16 September: Saints Cornelius, Pope, and Cyprian, Bishop, Martyrs – memorial
- 17 September: Saint Robert Bellarmine, Bishop and Doctor of the Church – optional memorial
- 17 September: Saint Hildegard of Bingen, Virgin and Doctor of the Church – optional memorial^{b}
- 19 September: Saint Januarius, Bishop and Martyr – optional memorial
- 20 September: Saints Andrew Kim Tae-gon, Priest, Paul Chong Ha-sang, and Companions, Martyrs – memorial
- 21 September: Saint Matthew, Apostle and Evangelist – feast
- 23 September: Saint Pius of Pietrelcina, Priest – memorial
- 26 September: Saints Cosmas and Damian, Martyrs – optional memorial
- 27 September: Saint Vincent de Paul, Priest – memorial
- 28 September: Saint Wenceslaus, Martyr – optional memorial
- 28 September: Saint Lawrence Ruiz and Companions, Martyrs – optional memorial
- 29 September: Saints Michael, Gabriel and Raphael, Archangels – feast
- 30 September: Saint Jerome, Priest and Doctor of the Church – memorial

^a On 11 February 2025, Pope Francis inscribed Saint Teresa of Calcutta, Virgin, in the General Roman Calendar.
^b On 25 January 2021, Pope Francis inscribed Saint Hildegard of Bingen, Virgin and Doctor of the Church, in the General Roman Calendar.

=== October ===
- 1 October: Saint Thérèse of the Child Jesus, Virgin and Doctor of the Church – memorial
- 2 October: The Holy Guardian Angels – memorial
- 4 October: Saint Francis of Assisi – memorial
- 5 October: Saint Faustina Kowalska, Virgin – optional memorial^{a}
- 6 October: Saint Bruno, Priest – optional memorial
- 7 October: Our Lady of the Rosary – memorial
- 9 October: Saint Denis, Bishop, and Companions, Martyrs – optional memorial
- 9 October: Saint John Leonardi, Priest – optional memorial
- 9 October: Saint John Henry Newman, Priest and Doctor of the Church - optional memorial^{d}
- 11 October: Saint John XXIII, Pope – optional memorial^{b}
- 14 October: Saint Callistus I, Pope and Martyr – optional memorial
- 15 October: Saint Teresa of Jesus, Virgin and Doctor of the Church – memorial
- 16 October: Saint Hedwig, Religious – optional memorial
- 16 October: Saint Margaret Mary Alacoque, Virgin – optional memorial
- 17 October: Saint Ignatius of Antioch, Bishop and Martyr – memorial
- 18 October: Saint Luke, Evangelist – feast
- 19 October: Saints John de Brébeuf, Isaac Jogues, Priests, and Companions, Martyrs – optional memorial
- 19 October: Saint Paul of the Cross, Priest – optional memorial
- 22 October: Saint John Paul II, Pope – optional memorial^{c}
- 23 October: Saint John of Capistrano, Priest – optional memorial
- 24 October: Saint Anthony Mary Claret, Bishop – optional memorial
- 28 October: Saints Simon and Jude, Apostles – feast

^a On 18 May 2020, Pope Francis inscribed Saint Faustina Kowalska, Virgin, in the General Roman Calendar.
^b On 29 May 2014, Pope Francis inscribed Saint John XXIII, Pope, in the General Roman Calendar.
^c On 29 May 2014, Pope Francis inscribed Saint John Paul II, Pope, in the General Roman Calendar.
^d On 3 February 2026, Pope Leo inscribed Saint John Henry Newman, Priest and Doctor of the Church, in the General Roman Calendar.

=== November ===
- 1 November: All Saints – solemnity
- 2 November: The Commemoration of All the Faithful Departed – ranked with solemnities
- 3 November: Saint Martin de Porres, Religious – optional memorial
- 4 November: Saint Charles Borromeo, Bishop – memorial
- 9 November: The Dedication of the Lateran Basilica – feast
- 10 November: Saint Leo the Great, Pope and Doctor of the Church – memorial
- 11 November: Saint Martin of Tours, Bishop – memorial
- 12 November: Saint Josaphat, Bishop and Martyr – memorial
- 15 November: Saint Albert the Great, Bishop and Doctor of the Church – optional memorial
- 16 November: Saint Margaret of Scotland – optional memorial
- 16 November: Saint Gertrude, Virgin – optional memorial
- 17 November: Saint Elizabeth of Hungary, Religious – memorial
- 18 November: The Dedication of the Basilicas of Saints Peter and Paul, Apostles – optional memorial
- 21 November: The Presentation of the Blessed Virgin Mary – memorial
- 22 November: Saint Cecilia, Virgin and Martyr – memorial
- 23 November: Saint Clement I, Pope and Martyr – optional memorial
- 23 November: Saint Columban, Abbot – optional memorial
- 24 November: Saints Andrew Dung-Lac, Priest, and Companions, Martyrs – memorial
- 25 November: Saint Catherine of Alexandria, Virgin and Martyr – optional memorial
- 30 November: Saint Andrew, Apostle – feast
- Last Sunday in Ordinary Time: Our Lord Jesus Christ, King of the Universe – solemnity

=== December ===
- 3 December: Saint Francis Xavier, Priest – memorial
- 4 December: Saint John Damascene, Priest and Doctor of the Church – optional memorial
- 6 December: Saint Nicholas, Bishop – optional memorial
- 7 December: Saint Ambrose, Bishop and Doctor of the Church – memorial
- 8 December: The Immaculate Conception of the Blessed Virgin Mary – solemnity
- 9 December: Saint Juan Diego Cuauhtlatoatzin – optional memorial
- 10 December: Our Lady of Loreto – optional memorial^{a}
- 11 December: Saint Damasus I, Pope – optional memorial
- 12 December: Our Lady of Guadalupe – optional memorial
- 13 December: Saint Lucy, Virgin and Martyr – memorial
- 14 December: Saint John of the Cross, Priest and Doctor of the Church – memorial
- 21 December: Saint Peter Canisius, Priest and Doctor of the Church – optional memorial
- 23 December: Saint John of Kanty, Priest – optional memorial
- 25 December: Nativity of the Lord – solemnity
- 26 December: Saint Stephen, the First Martyr – feast
- 27 December: Saint John, Apostle and Evangelist – feast
- 28 December: The Holy Innocents, Martyrs – feast
- 29 December: Saint Thomas Becket, Bishop and Martyr – optional memorial
- 31 December: Saint Sylvester I, Pope – optional memorial
- Sunday within the Octave of Christmas, or, if there is no such Sunday, 30 December: The Holy Family of Jesus, Mary and Joseph – feast

^a On 31 October 2019, Pope Francis inscribed Our Lady of Loreto in the General Roman Calendar.

== Particular calendars ==
The General Calendar is printed, for instance, in the Roman Missal and the Liturgy of the Hours. These are up to date when printed, but additional feasts may be added later. For that reason, if those celebrating the liturgy have not inserted into the books a note about the changes, they must consult the current annual publication, known as the "Ordo", for their country or religious congregation.

These annual publications, like those that, disregarding the feasts that are obligatory in the actual church where the liturgy is celebrated, list only celebrations included in the General Calendar, are useful only for the current year, since they omit celebrations impeded because of falling on a Sunday or during periods such as Holy Week and the Octave of Easter.

This distinction is made in application of the decision of the Second Vatican Council: "Lest the feasts of the saints should take precedence over the feasts which commemorate the very mysteries of salvation, many of them should be left to be celebrated by a particular Church or nation or family of religious; only those should be extended to the universal Church which commemorate saints who are truly of universal importance."

=== Diocesan and parish calendars ===
The calendar for a diocese is typically based on a national calendar, with a few additions. For instance, the anniversary of the dedication of the cathedral is celebrated as a solemnity in the cathedral church and as a feast in all the other churches of the diocese. The feast day of the principal patron saint of the diocese is celebrated as a feast throughout the diocese.

== See also ==
- Calendar of saints
- Ranking of liturgical days in the Roman Rite
