= Frederick W. Beinecke =

American philanthropist

Frederick W. Beinecke (1887–1971) was an American philanthropist who was the founder of the Beinecke Rare Book and Manuscript Library at Yale University.

He was the son of German immigrant Johann Bernhard George Beinecke, one of the main financiers and one of three co-founders, with Harry S. Black and hotelier Fred Sterry, of the Plaza Hotel. He lived in Cranford, New Jersey with his wife Carrie Regina Sperry Beinecke, who was the daughter of William Miller Sperry, from the mid-1910s to the mid-1920s. He was the father of William Sperry Beinecke and grandfather of Frances Beinecke.
