= Papyrus Oxyrhynchus 216 =

Ancient Greek manuscript

Papyrus Oxyrhynchus 216 (P. Oxy. 216 or P. Oxy. II 216) is a rhetorical exercise by an unknown author, written in Greek. It was discovered in Oxyrhynchus. The manuscript was written on papyrus in the form of a roll. It is dated to the first century BC or first century AD. Currently it is housed in the Beinecke Rare Book and Manuscript Library (35) of the Yale University.

== Description ==
The document was written by an unknown copyist. The measurements of the fragment are 175 by 194 mm. The text is written in a large uncial hand. It is paleographically important because it can be dated relatively accurately. It was found with a number of documents dated to the time of Tiberius and Claudius. The verso side of the document contains a late first century letter which is mostly obscured by another document, glued to the scroll to strengthen it.

It was discovered by Grenfell and Hunt in 1897 in Oxyrhynchus. The text was published by Grenfell and Hunt in 1899.

== See also ==
- Oxyrhynchus Papyri
- Papyrus Oxyrhynchus 215
- Papyrus Oxyrhynchus 217
