= Papyrus Oxyrhynchus 220 =

Ancient Greek papyrus

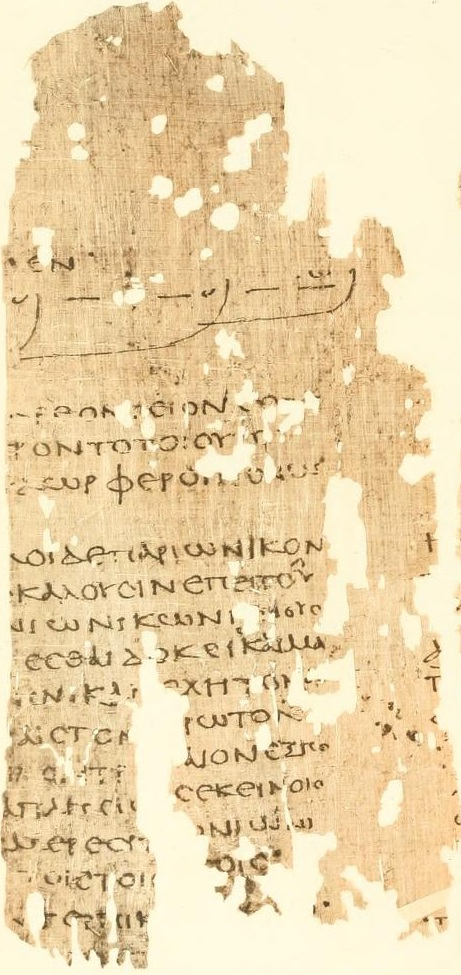
P. Oxy. 220

Papyrus Oxyrhynchus 220 (P. Oxy. 220 or P. Oxy. II 220) is a treatise on prosody, written by an unknown author in Greek. It was discovered in Oxyrhynchus. The manuscript was written on papyrus in the form of a roll. It is dated to the first century or second century AD. Currently it is housed in the British Library (Department of Manuscripts, 1184) in London.

== Description ==
The document was written by an unknown copyist. The recto side consists of fragments of a work on prosody. The verso side consists of Homeric scholia to the Iliad (Papyrus Oxyrhynchus 221). The text on the recto side is written in a round well formed upright uncial hand.

It was discovered by Grenfell and Hunt in 1897 in Oxyrhynchus. The text was published by Grenfell and Hunt in 1899.

== Excerpt ==
...which are naturally employed by addition and by subtraction. It is thus evident that both metres employ the same feet and arrangement. Accordingly the scheme of the metre is the same as that of the Phalaecean, only shorter by the last syllable. For in that metre also the feet of two syllables are interchangeable at the beginning of the verse, and all the variations open to the Nicarchean metre are shared by it. Hence, dear friend, it will employ not only the regular ten syllables, but also a larger number.

Grenfell and Hunt note that the Nicarchean metre is not known from any source other than this papyrus.

== See also ==
- Oxyrhynchus Papyri
- Papyrus Oxyrhynchus 219
- Papyrus Oxyrhynchus 221
