= Papyrus Oxyrhynchus 217 =

Greek papyrus fragment

Papyrus Oxyrhynchus 217 (P. Oxy. 217 or P. Oxy. II 217) is a letter to a king of Macedon by an unknown author, written in Greek. It was discovered in Oxyrhynchus. The manuscript was written on papyrus in the form of a roll. It is dated to the third century AD. Currently it is housed in the Cambridge University Library (35) in Cambridge.

== Description ==
The document was written by an unknown copyist. It consists of a letter to a king of Macedon by an unknown author, possibly Aristotle or Theopompus. The measurements of the fragment are 131 by 73 mm. The text is written in an uncial hand similar to Papyrus Oxyrhynchus 23. The margin is remarkably high at the top.

It was discovered by Grenfell and Hunt in 1897 in Oxyrhynchus. The text was published by Grenfell and Hunt in 1899.

== Text ==
(Since) the rule of your monarchy is far superior to that of all monarchies that have ever existed, its system and the characteristic feature of the present times ought to be law, especially among those who do not enjoy elective offices in an organized state.

== See also ==
- Oxyrhynchus Papyri
- Papyrus Oxyrhynchus 216
- Papyrus Oxyrhynchus 218
