= Papyrus Oxyrhynchus 276 =

Greek papyrus fragment

Papyrus Oxyrhynchus 276 (P. Oxy. 276 or P. Oxy. II 276) is a fragment of a Transport of Corn, in Greek. It was discovered in Oxyrhynchus. The manuscript was written on papyrus in the form of a sheet. It is dated to 5 September 77. Currently it is housed in the Beinecke Rare Book and Manuscript Library of the Yale University (38) in New Haven.

== Description ==
The document was written by Ptollas. It is an acknowledgment of receipt addressed by three steermen on a cargo-boat, one of whom is a Jew, through a soldier of the second legion who was sailing on their boat, to the sitologi of a village. The receipt related to a cargo of corn which was being conveyed to Alexandria.

The measurements of the fragment are 109 by 105 mm.

It was discovered by Grenfell and Hunt in 1897 in Oxyrhynchus. The text was published by Grenfell and Hunt in 1899.

== See also ==
- Oxyrhynchus Papyri
