= Papyrus Oxyrhynchus 219 =

Greek papyrus fragment

Papyrus Oxyrhynchus 219 (P. Oxy. 219 or P. Oxy. II 219) is a lament for a pet by an unknown author, written in Greek. It was discovered in Oxyrhynchus. The manuscript was written on papyrus in the form of a roll. It is dated to the first century AD. Currently it is housed in the Beinecke Rare Book and Manuscript Library (36) of the Yale University.

== Description ==
The document was written by an unknown copyist. It contains the end of a lament mourning the loss of a favorite fighting cock. The measurements of the fragment are 122 by 184 mm. The text is written in a rough and rather difficult cursive hand. The iota adscript is frequently added where not required.

It was discovered by Grenfell and Hunt in 1897 in Oxyrhynchus. The text was published by Grenfell and Hunt in 1899.

== Text ==
...I am at a loss where to go. My ship is shattered. I weep for the loss of my sweet bird. Come, let me take the chick he nurtures (?), he, my warrior, my beauty, my Greek cock. For his sake was I called great in my life, and deemed happy, comrades, in my breeding cares. I am distraught, for my cock has failed me; he fell in love with Thacathalpas (?) and deserted me. But I shall find rest, having set a stone upon my heart; so fare ye well, my friends.

== See also ==
- Oxyrhynchus Papyri
- Papyrus Oxyrhynchus 218
- Papyrus Oxyrhynchus 220
