= Sanctorale =

Main cycle of the General Roman Calendar

The sanctorale (/ˌsæŋktəˈreɪli, -ˈrɑːleɪ/ SANK-tə-RAY-lee, -RAH-lay) is one of the two main cycles which, running concurrently, comprise the liturgical year in Roman Catholicism, as defined by the General Roman Calendar. It is also used by a number of other Christian denominations.

== Terminology ==
The term comes into English from medieval Latin sanctorāle (from sanctus 'saint'), modelled on the name of the other main cycle, the temporale. The sanctorale is also known as the proper of the saints, with proper a noun in the sense 'that part of the Eucharist or liturgical offices which is varied according to the calendar or the particular occasion; an office or part of an office, as a psalm, lesson, etc., or portion of the Eucharist, appointed for a particular occasion or season'. The Merriam-Webster Dictionary refers to sanctoral as an adjective relating to the sanctorale.

== Usage ==
The temporale consists of the movable feasts, most of them keyed to Easter (which falls on a different Sunday every year), including Ascension, Pentecost (Whitsun), and so on. The sanctorale consists of the fixed feasts, celebrated on the very same date each year (no matter what the day of the week), including Christmas and all the saints' days.

Because the events of sanctorale and the temporale do not occur in the same order every year, the two cycles are often written separately in liturgical books, specifically that section of the Missal known as the Breviary. Accordingly, a collection of saints' lives arranged in liturgical order may also be called a sanctorale. One prominent example of these is the hagiographies by Ælfric of Eynsham.
