= Temporale =

A main cycle of the General Roman Calendar

The temporale (English: /tɛmpɒˈreɪliː/ or /tɛmpɒˈrɑːleɪ/) is one of the two main cycles that, running concurrently, comprise the Liturgical year in Roman Catholicism, defined by the General Roman Calendar. (The other cycle is the sanctorale.) The term comes into English from medieval Latin temporāle (from tempus 'time').

The temporale consists of the movable feasts, most of them keyed to Easter (which falls on a different Sunday every year), including Ascension, Pentecost (Whitsun), and so on. The sanctorale consists of the fixed feasts, celebrated on the very same date each year (no matter what the day of the week), including Christmas and all the saints' days.

The temporale is also known as the proper of time, with proper a noun in the sense 'that part of the Eucharist or liturgical offices which is varied according to the calendar or the particular occasion; an office or part of an office, as a psalm, lesson, etc., or portion of the Eucharist, appointed for a particular occasion or season'.

Because the events of sanctorale and the temporale do not occur in the same order every year, the two cycles are often written separately in liturgical books, specifically that section of the Missal known as the Breviary.

Prominent events in the temporale are: Lent (including Ash Wednesday, Palm Sunday of the Passion of the Lord, and Holy Week); the Paschal Triduum (including Good Friday, Holy Saturday, the Easter Vigil and Easter Sunday); and Easter Time (the fifty days from Easter Sunday to Pentecost Sunday).
