= Ląd, Greater Poland Voivodeship =

Ląd
- Village
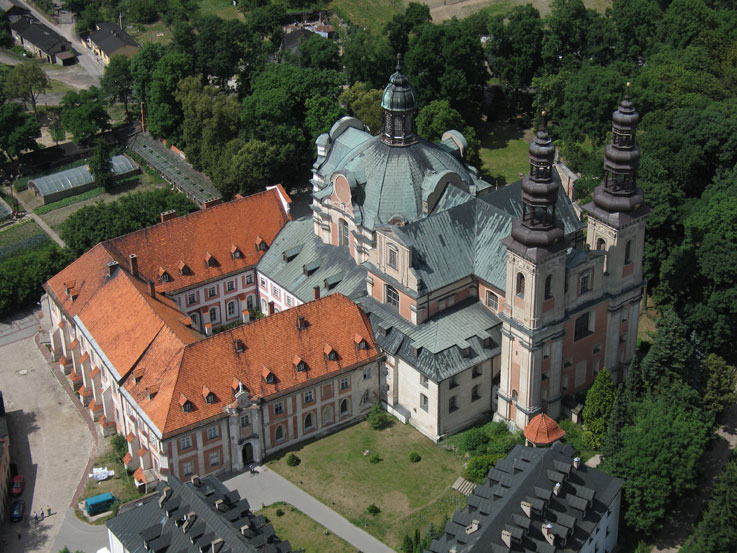
- Ląd Abbey

- Location within Poland
- Coordinates: 52°12′N 17°54′E
- Country: Poland
- Voivodeship: Greater Poland
- County: Słupca
- Gmina: Lądek

Population
  - Total: 60
- Time zone: UTC+1 (CET)
  - Summer (DST): UTC+2 (CEST)
- Vehicle registration: PSL

Ląd [lɔnt] is a village in the administrative district of Gmina Lądek, within Słupca County, Greater Poland Voivodeship, in west-central Poland.

== Cistercian Abbey ==
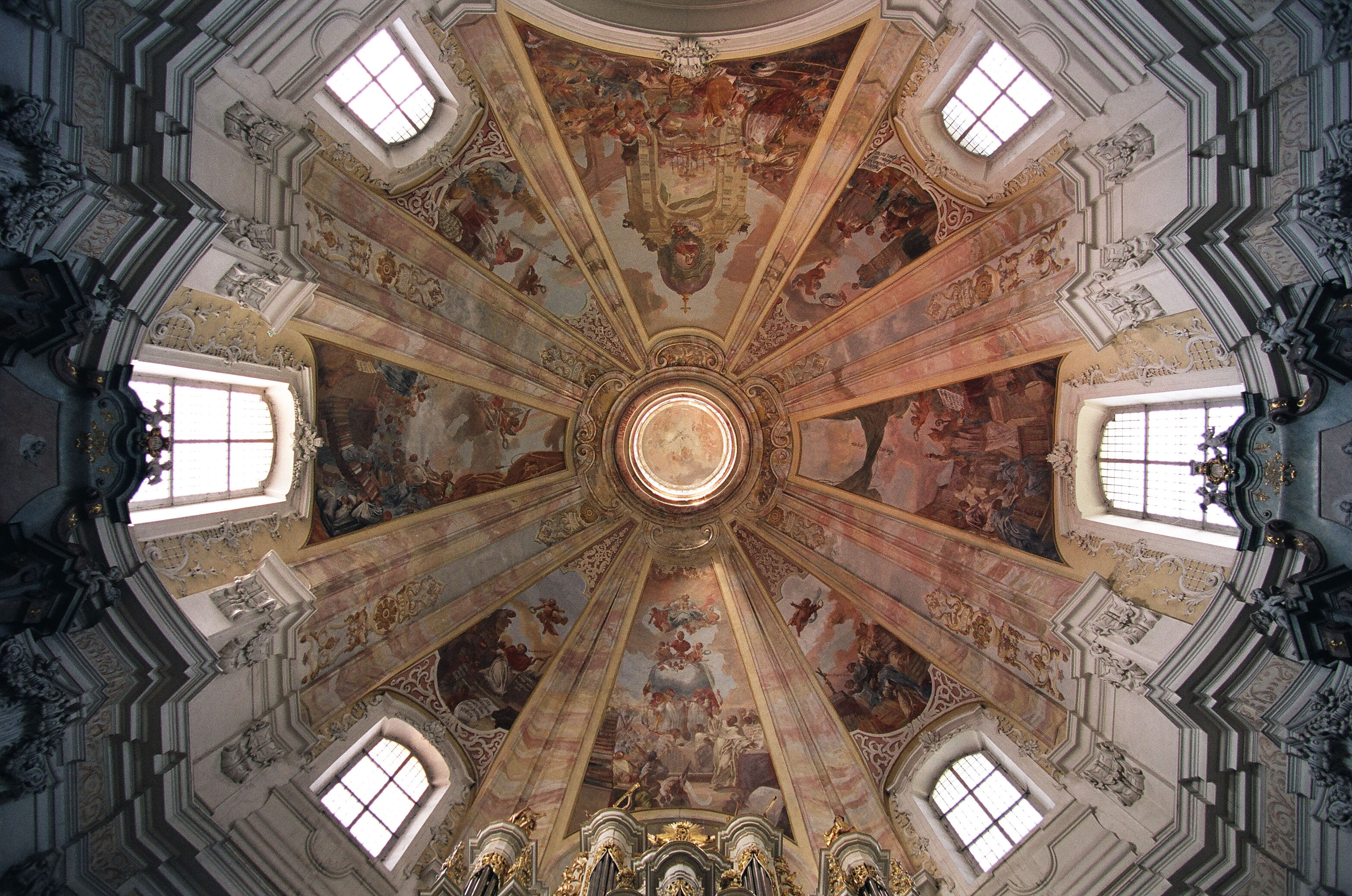
Interior of the monastery church

The village is the location of a Cistercian monastery, the Ląd Abbey. Founded about 1150 one kilometer south of the village center, it is one of the seven daughter houses of the Altenberg Abbey. Its major buildings date from the 16th and 17th centuries. In 1793 the village was annexed by Prussia in the Second Partition of Poland, and in 1796 most of the abbey's surrounding property was confiscated by the Prussian government. In 1807, the village was regained by Poles and included within the short-lived Duchy of Warsaw. Following the duchy's dissolution in 1815, Ląd fell to the Russian Partition, and in 1819 the Cistercian monastery was dissolved.

Following World War I, Poland regained independence and control of the village, and from 1921 the abbey has been operated and maintained by the Salesians of Don Bosco. The Polish World War II martyr Kazimierz Wojciechowski served there as a tutor in the 1920s. During the German occupation of Poland (World War II), at the turn of 1939 and 1940, the occupiers imprisoned arrested Polish priests from Włocławek in the abbey, and afterwards deported them to the Dachau concentration camp, where most of them died (see: Nazi persecution of the Catholic Church in Poland).

The abbey is one of Poland's official national Historic Monuments (Pomnik historii), as designated on 1 July 2009 and tracked by the National Heritage Board of Poland.

== Transport ==
The Voivodeship road 467 passes through Ląd and the Polish A2 motorway runs nearby, north of the village.
