= Beinecke Rare Book and Manuscript Library =

Archive at Yale University in Connecticut

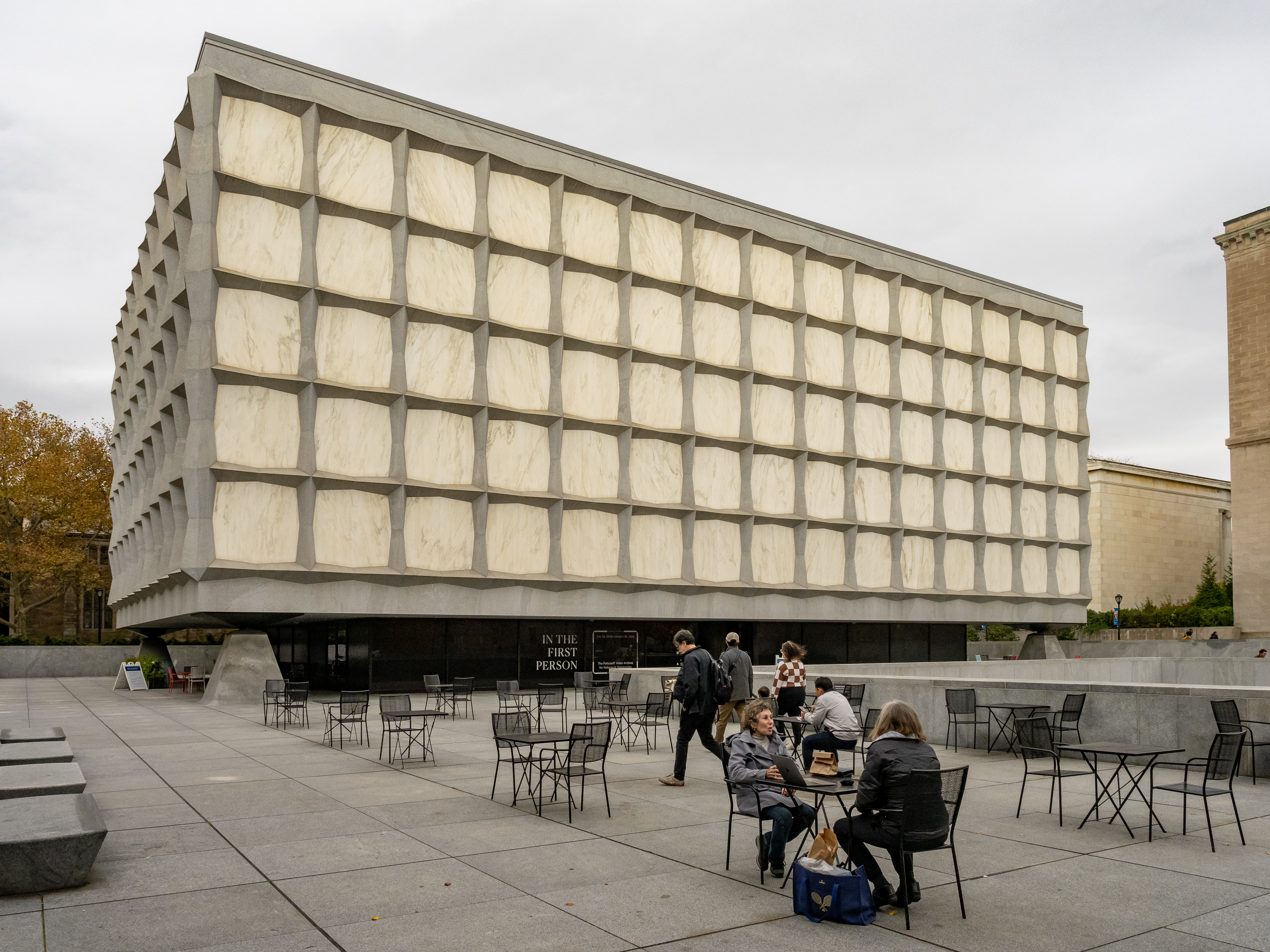
- Library, year 2024
- 41.31161°N 72.92722°W
- Location: New Haven, Connecticut
- Established: 1963
- Architect: Gordon Bunshaft

Collection
- Items collected: Rare books and manuscripts

Other information
- Parent organization: Yale University
- Website: beinecke.library.yale.edu

The Beinecke Rare Book and Manuscript Library is the rare book library and literary archive of Yale University Library in New Haven, Connecticut. It is one of the largest buildings in the world dedicated to rare books and manuscripts and is one of the largest collections of such texts. Established by a gift of the Beinecke family and given its own financial endowment, the library is financially independent from the university and is co-governed by Yale University Library and Yale Corporation.

Situated on Yale University's Hewitt Quadrangle, the building was designed by Gordon Bunshaft of Skidmore, Owings & Merrill and completed in 1963. From 2015 to 2016 the library building was closed for 18 months for major renovations, which included replacing the building's HVAC system and expanding teaching and exhibition capabilities.

== Architecture ==
The Beinecke Library is an International Style building. Its six-story above-ground glass-enclosed tower of book stacks is encased by a windowless façade, supported by four monolithic piers at the corners of the building. The exterior shell is structurally supported by a steel frame with pylons embedded 50 feet (15 m) to bedrock at each corner pier, and the façade is constructed of translucent veined marble and granite. The marble was quarried from Danby, Vermont, and milled to a thickness of 1.25 inches (32 mm) in order to allow filtered daylight to permeate the interior in a subtle golden amber glow. Gordon Bunshaft attributed the inspiration for this effect to "what I thought was onyx in a Renaissance-type palace in Istanbul," referring to the alabaster used in the Dolmabahçe Palace hammam.

These panels are framed by a hexagonal grid of Vermont Woodbury granite veneer, fastened to a structural steel frame. The outside dimensions have Platonic mathematical proportions of 1:2:3 (height: width: length). The building has been called a "jewel box", "treasure casket" (by Bunshaft himself), and a "laboratory for the humanities". It contains furniture designed by Florence Knoll and Marcel Breuer.

An elevated public exhibition mezzanine surrounds the glass stack tower, and displays among other things, one of the 48 extant copies of the Gutenberg Bible. Two basement floors extend under much of Hewitt Quadrangle. The first sub-grade level, the "Court" level, centers on a sunken courtyard in front of the Beinecke, which features The Garden (Pyramid, Sun, and Cube). These are abstract allegorical sculptures by Isamu Noguchi that are said to represent time (the pyramid), sun (the disc), and chance (the cube). This level also features a secure reading room for visiting researchers, administrative offices, and book storage areas. The level of the building two floors below ground has movable-aisle high-density shelving for books and archives.

The Beinecke is one of the larger buildings in America devoted entirely to rare books and manuscripts. The library has room in the central tower for 180,000 volumes and room for over 1 million volumes in the underground book stacks. The library's collection, which is housed both in the library's main building and at Yale University's Library Shelving Facility in Hamden, Connecticut, totals roughly 1 million volumes and several million manuscripts.

During the 1960s, the Claes Oldenburg sculpture Lipstick (Ascending) on Caterpillar Tracks was displayed in Hewitt Quadrangle. The sculpture has since been moved to the courtyard of Morse College, one of the university's residential dormitories.

The design of the Beinecke Library later inspired the glass-walled structure that protects and displays the original core collection (the books given by King George III and referred to as the King's Library) within the British Library building in Euston, London.

Gallery

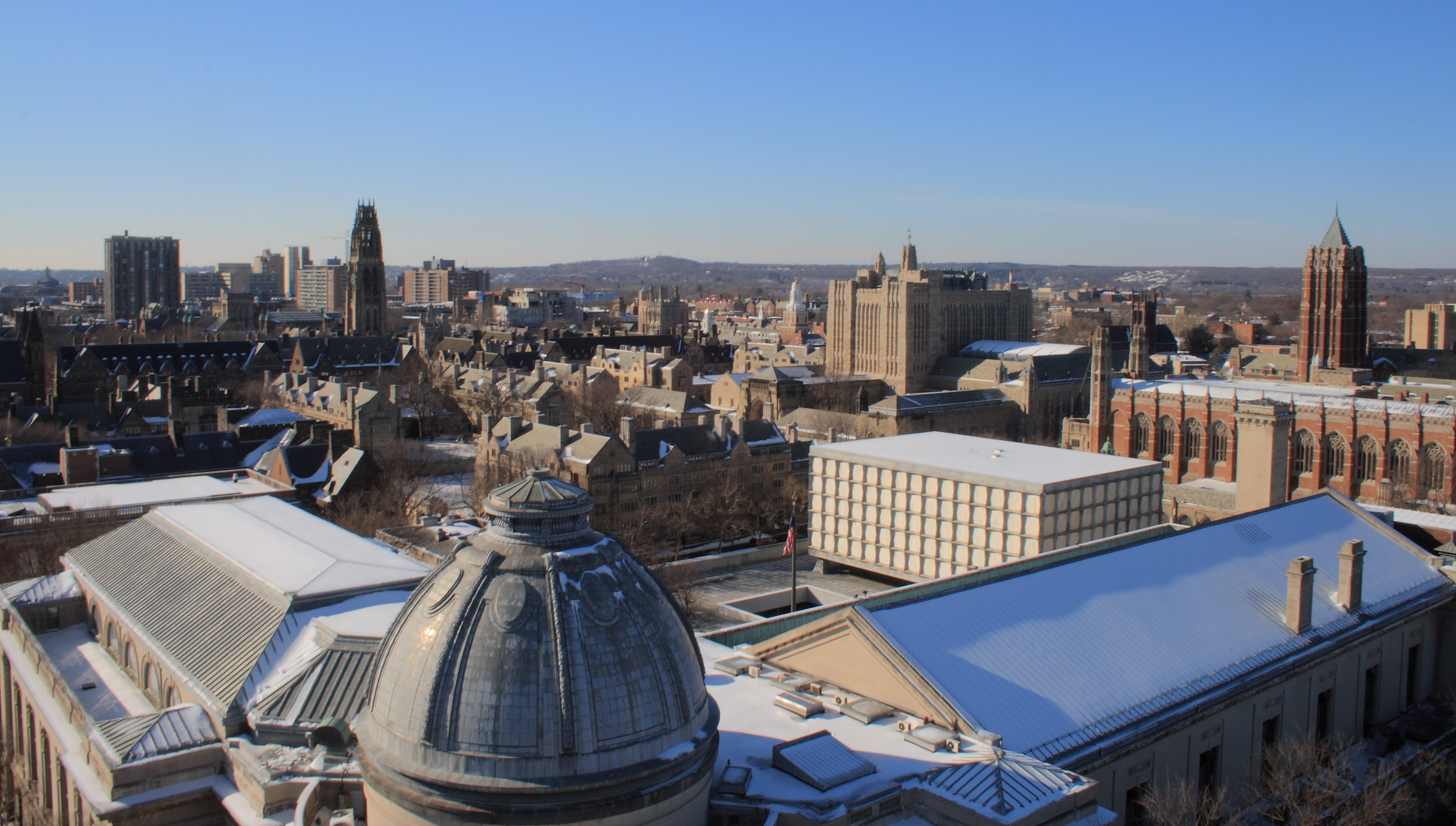
The Beinecke Library in architectural context, including Woolsey Hall in the foreground

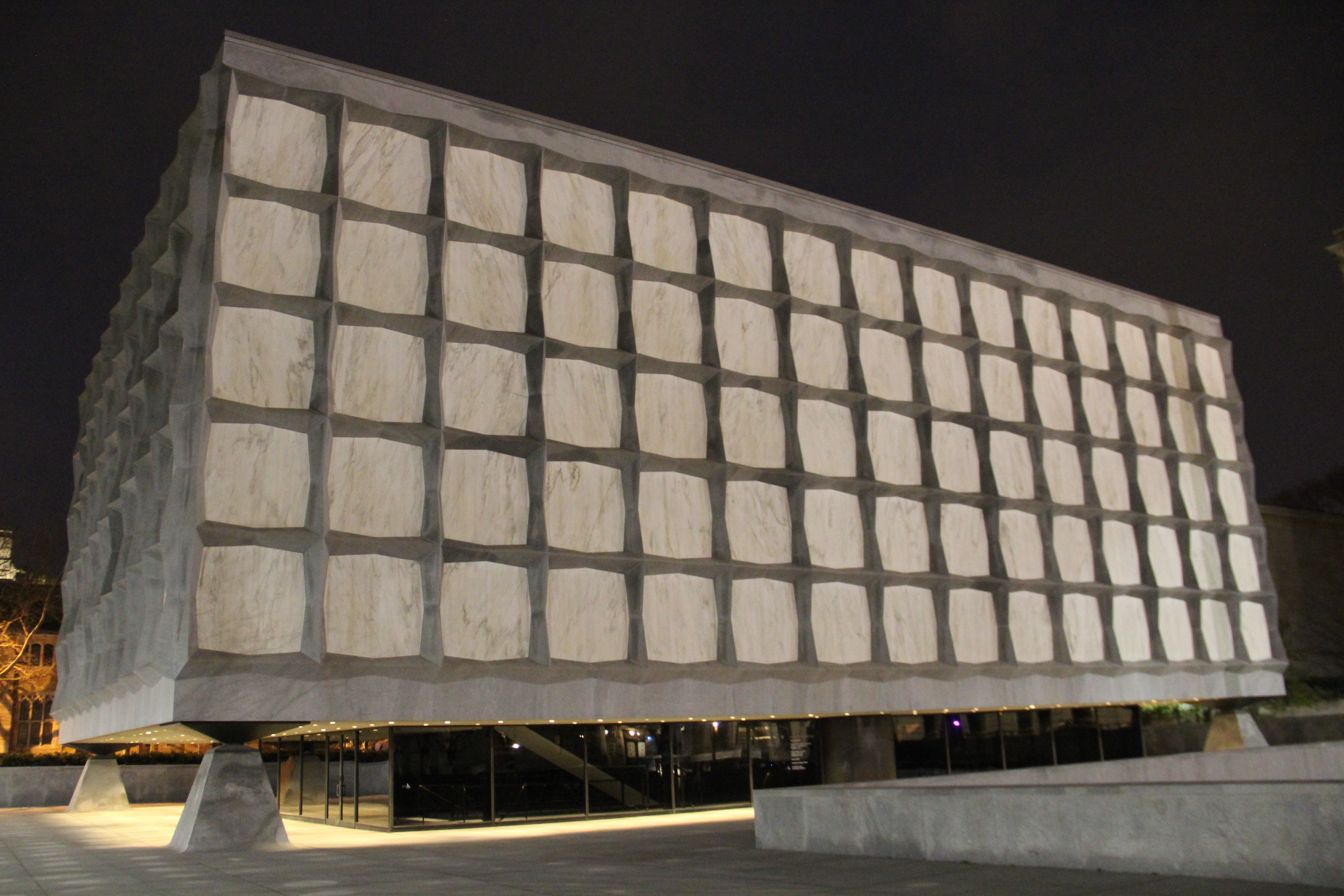
Exterior view at night

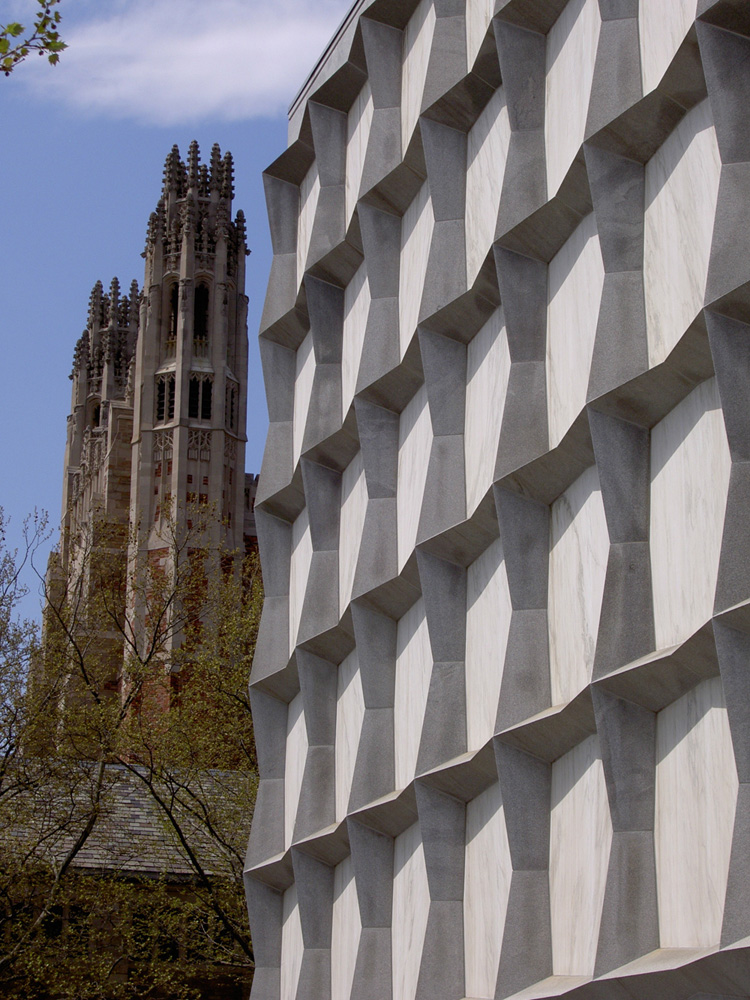
Closeup of the building's geometric exterior

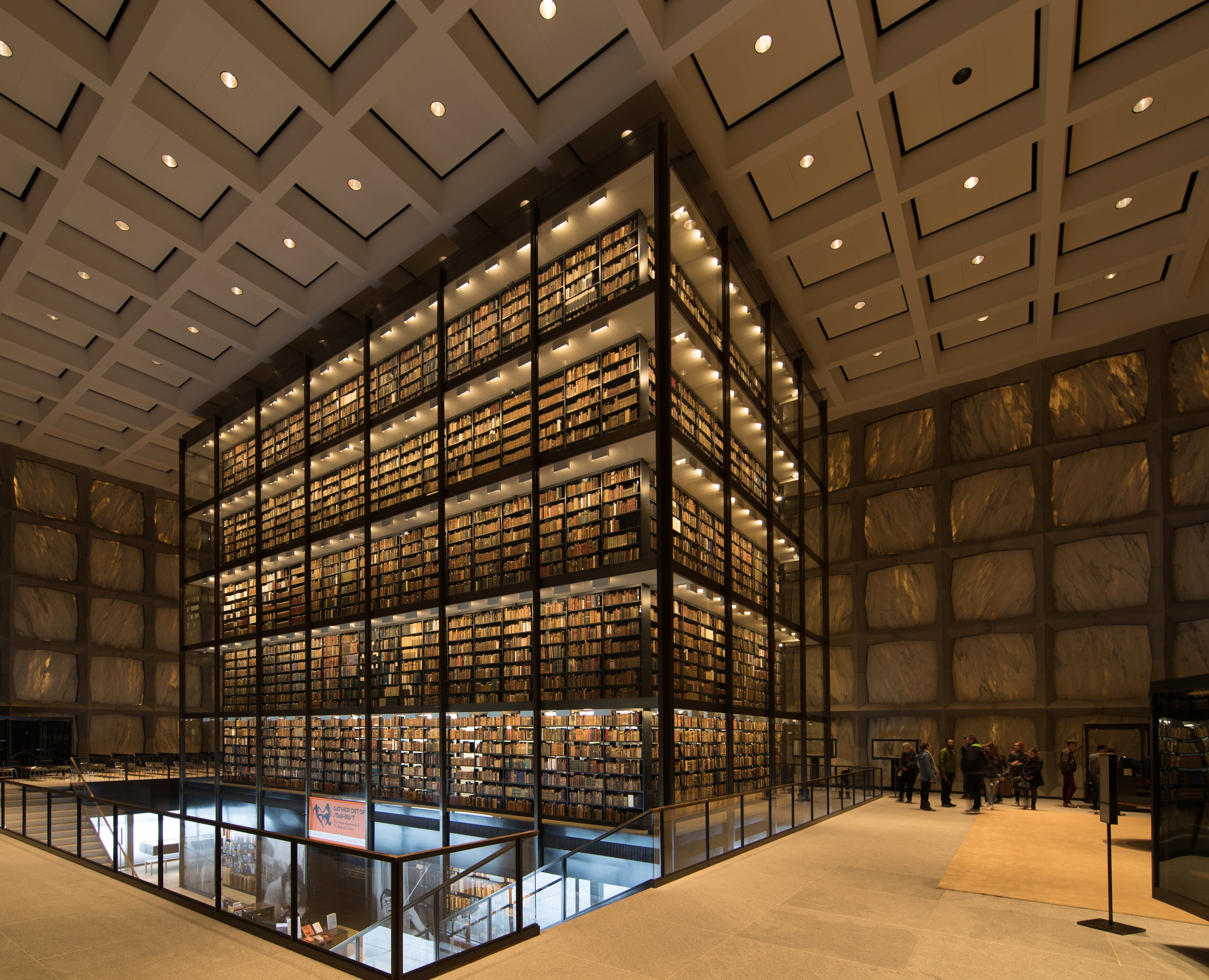
Sunlight through the building's marble panels supplements the interior's artificial lighting

== History ==
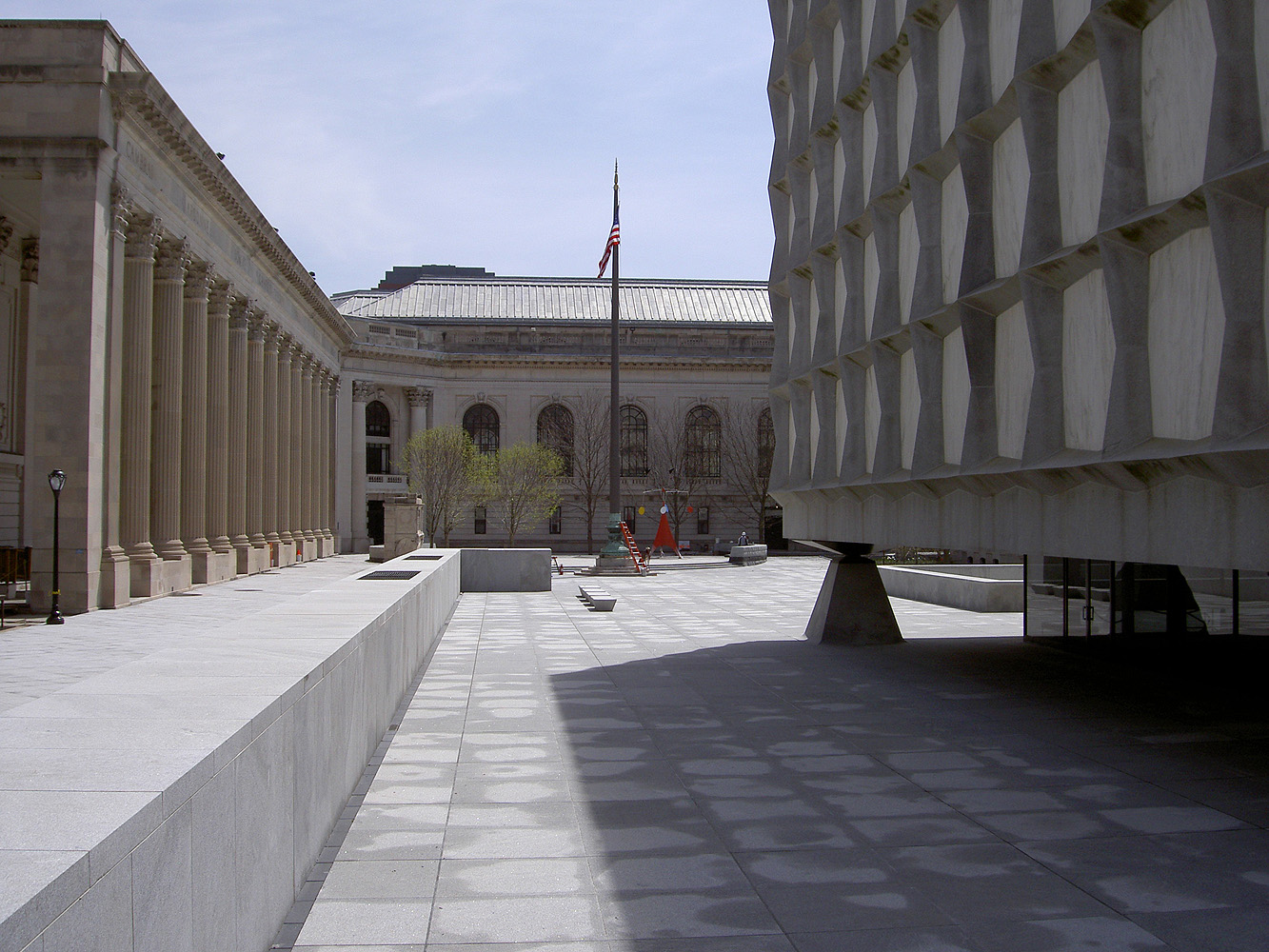
View of the neoclassical Hewitt Quadrangle surrounding the library

In the late 19th century, rare and valuable books of the Library of Yale College were placed on special shelving at the College Library, now known as Dwight Hall. When the university received a multimillion-dollar bequest from John W. Sterling for the construction of Sterling Memorial Library in 1918, the university decided to create a dedicated reading room for its rare books, which became the building's Rare Book Room when the building opened in 1930. Because the bequest did not contain an allowance for books or materials, Yale English professor Chauncey Brewster Tinker petitioned Yale alumni to donate materials that would give the university a collection as monumental as its new building. By the time Sterling opened, Tinker's appeal garnered an impressive collection of rare books, including a Gutenberg Bible from Anna M. Harkness and several major collections from the Beinecke family, most notably its collection on the American West.

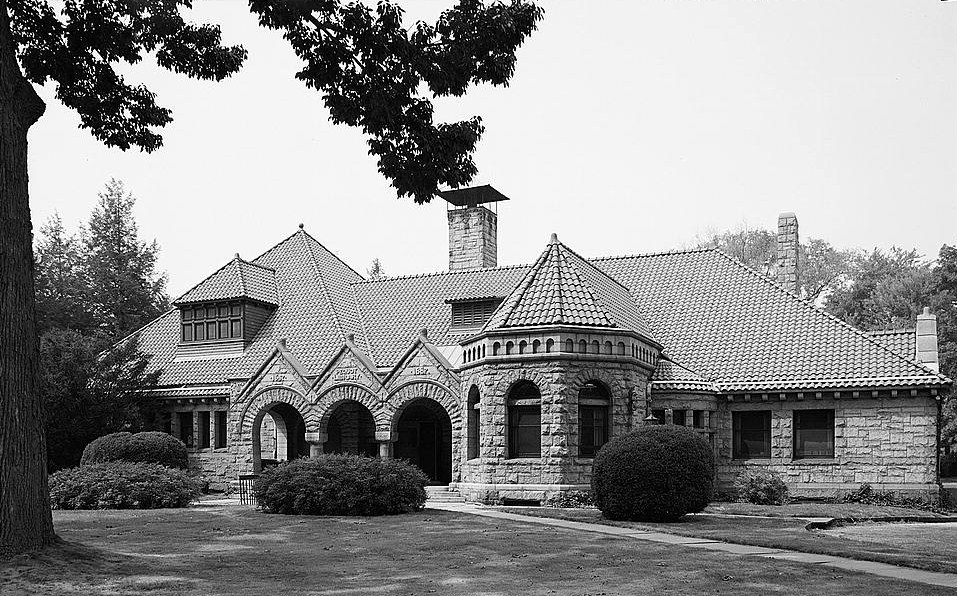
Pequot Library Association, owners of the Monroe, Wakeman, and Holman Collection on permanent loan to Beinecke Library

By 1958, the library owned more than 130,000 rare volumes and many more manuscripts. The amassed collection proved too large for Sterling's reading room, and the reading room unsuited to their preservation. Having already given significant collections to Yale, Edwin and Frederick W. Beinecke—as well as Johanna Weigle, widow of their brother Walter—gave funds to build a dedicated rare books library building. When the Beinecke Library opened on October 14, 1963, it became the home of the volumes from Rare Book Room, and three special collections: the Collection of American Literature, the Collection of Western Americana, and the Collection of German Literature. Shortly afterward, they were joined by the James Marshall and Marie-Louise Osborn Collection.

Beinecke Library became the repository for books in the Yale collection printed anywhere before 1800, books printed in Latin America before 1751, books printed in North America before 1821, newspapers and broadsides printed in the United States before 1851, European tracts and pamphlets printed before 1801, and Slavic, East European, Near and Middle Eastern books through the eighteenth century, as well as special books outside these categories.

Now, the collection spans through to the present day, including such modern works as limited-edition poetry and artists' books. The library also contains thousands of linear feet of archival material, ranging from ancient papyri and medieval manuscripts to the archived personal papers of modern writers. In 2013, Yale purchased a vast collection of legal manuscripts from barrister Anthony Taussig: “the world’s most extensive private collection ever assembled for the study of the cultural and intellectual history of law in England”.

== Special collections ==
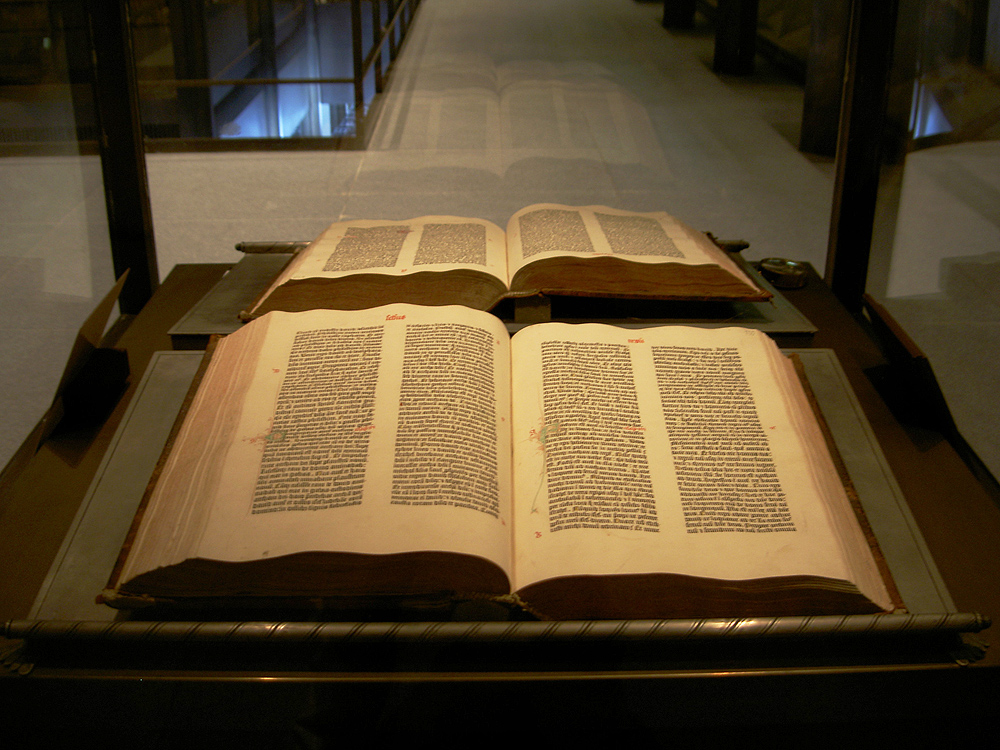
The two volumes of an original Gutenberg Bible

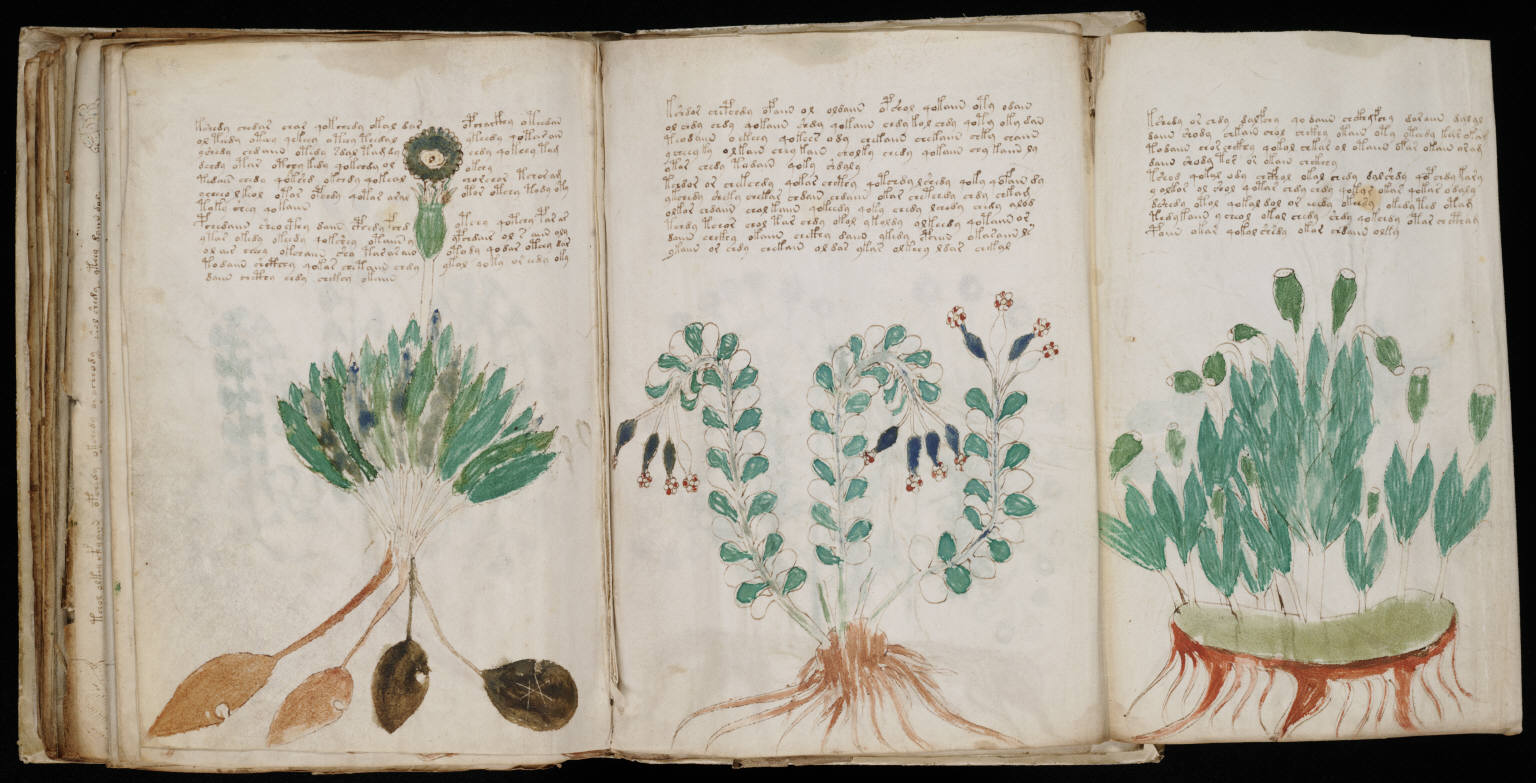
The Voynich manuscript housed at Beinecke Library

The library is open to all Yale University students and faculty, and to visiting researchers whose work requires use of its special collections. In order to access materials, there are a few forms and policies that users must read.

The Beinecke Library also hold several hundred items from special collections institution Pequot Library. The collection consists largely of correspondence and documents from the colonial, revolutionary, Federal, and antebellum periods, extending well into the postbellum era.

The holdings of the Beinecke Library include:

- American Children's Literature
- John James Audubon (Note: The Audubon collection includes two copies of the double elephant folio of Birds of America)
- James M. Barrie
- John Baskerville
- William Thomas Beckford
- Sir John Betjeman
- James Boswell
- John Boswell
- Joseph Brodsky
- Bryher
- Mary Butts
- Rachel Carson
- Cartography, including the "Vinland Map"
- Cary Collection of Playing Cards
- Ernst Cassirer
- Congregationalism
- Joseph Conrad
- Walter Crane
- Dada
- The d'Aulaire Collection (Ingri and Edgar Parin d'Aulaire)
- Daniel Defoe
- Charles Dickens
- Norman Douglas
- Lawrence Durrell
- Jonathan Edwards
- George Eliot
- The Elizabethan Club collection (Note: The Elizabethan Club collection is composed of about 300 volumes of 16th- and 17th-century literature, including the first four folios of Shakespeare, the Huth Shakespeare quartos, and first or early quartos of all the major dramatists)
- Erasmus and his contemporaries
- Faust
- Fantasy Magazine Archives
- Henry Fielding
- Benjamin Franklin
- Goethe
- George Grosz
- Greek and Latin literature
- Thomas Hardy
- H.D. Papers
- W. Head & Sister, photographers
- Langston Hughes
- Humanism
- Incunabula (over 3100 volumes including the Melk copy of the Gutenberg Bible)
- James Weldon Johnson Collection
- James Joyce
- Judaica
- Rudyard Kipling
- D. H. Lawrence
- Doris Lessing
- Sinclair Lewis
- Pre-1600 manuscripts (Note: Early manuscripts including more than 1,100 medieval and Renaissance codices and several hundred manuscript fragments dating from the fourth century through the Renaissance, as well as the Voynich Manuscript)
- Thomas Mann
- F. T. Marinetti
- John Masefield
- F. O. Matthiessen
- The Mellon Collection of Alchemy and the Occult
- George Meredith
- William J. Minor Horse Racing Papers.
- Eugene O'Neill Jr.
- Ornithology
- the Papyrus Collection
  - Papyrus Oxyrhynchus 216
  - Papyrus Oxyrhynchus 219
  - Papyrus Oxyrhynchus 276
- Polish Literature
- Pop-up books and movable books
- Ezra Pound Papers
- Dorothy Richardson
- Rilke
- Rochambeau Family
- Bruce Rogers
- the Romanov Family photo albums
- Olga Rudge Papers
- John Ruskin
- Russian Literature
- Schiller
- Miriam Schlein
- Sixteenth-Century Printed Books
- Sporting Books
- The Gertrude Stein and Alice B. Toklas Collection
- Robert Louis Stevenson
- James J. Strang
- Monroe, Wakeman, and Holman Collection of the Pequot Library Association
- Anthony Taussig collection of English legal manuscripts
- Alexis de Tocqueville
- Vanderbilt Collection
- Carl Van Vechten
- Paula Vogel
- The Voynich manuscript
- Rebecca West
- Edith Wharton
- The Thornton Wilder papers
- Kurt Wolff

== Exhibitions ==
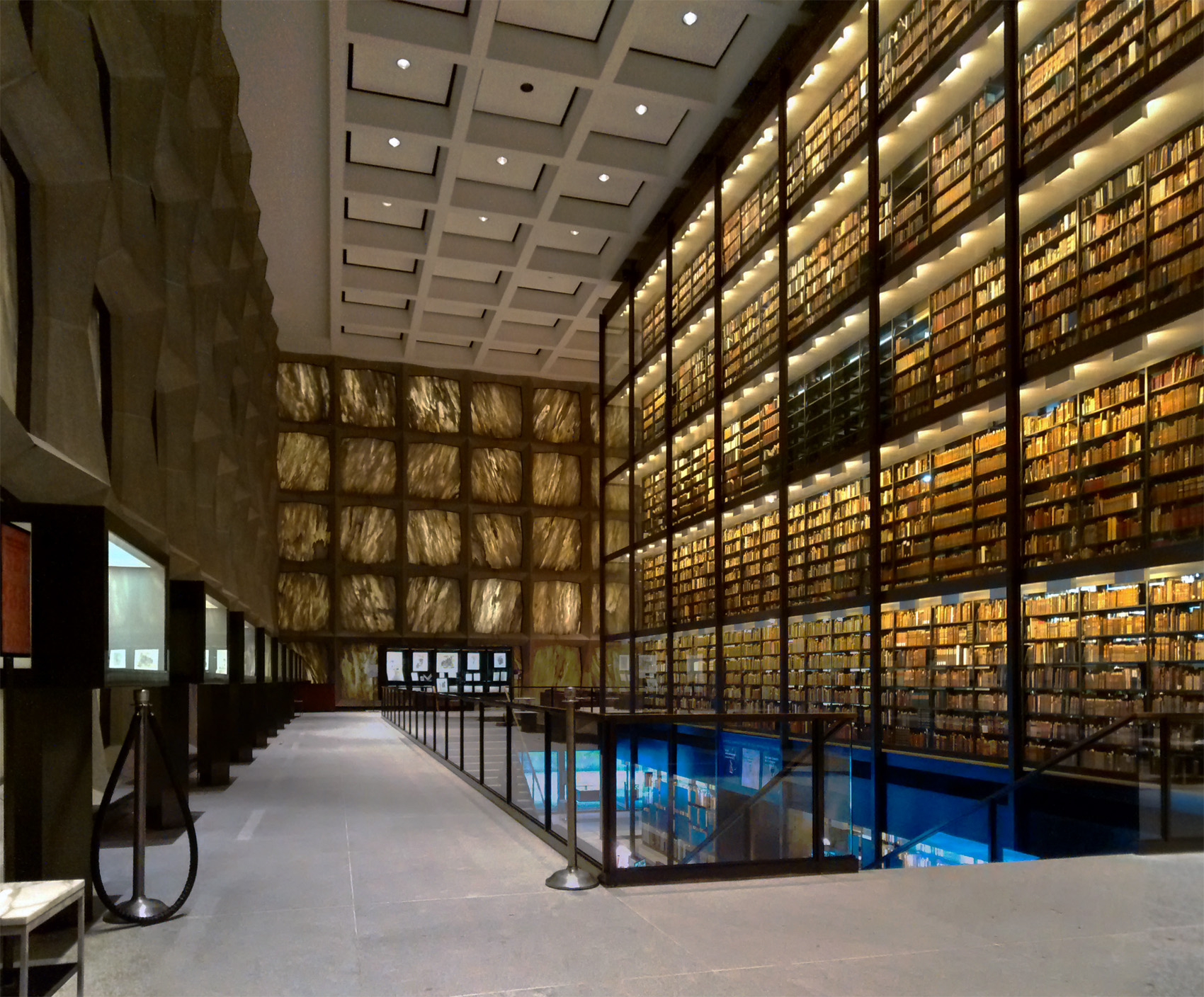
Illuminated display cases on the mezzanine level hold temporary exhibits

In addition to items on permanent display such as the Gutenberg Bible, the Beinecke offers a year-round program of temporary exhibits drawn from its collections. For example, in 2006 the library presented Breaking the Binding: Printing and the Third Dimension, a show of flap books, pop-ups, perspective books, panoramas, and peep-shows in printed form. Display cases are located on the mezzanine level and at the ground floor entry level, and may be freely viewed by the general public whenever the library is open.

The Library celebrated its 50th anniversary in 2013. There were two full-year exhibitions that explored the library's architecture and people as well as a series of showcases of rarely seen manuscripts, printed works, and visual objects from across all curatorial areas.

== Security ==
The Beinecke collection does not circulate; all materials are to be consulted in the reading room. The library hosts almost 10,000 research visits annually, almost half of which are with scholars having no formal affiliation to Yale University.

Security measures were significantly increased after the well-known antiques dealer Edward Forbes Smiley III was caught cutting maps from rare books with an X-acto blade in 2005. Smiley's scheme was discovered when he dropped his concealed tool in the reading room, and he subsequently served several years in prison for thefts of rare documents valued in millions of dollars from the Beinecke and other libraries. The library operates under a closed stack system, and rigorous security rules now allow carefully controlled access to materials under video surveillance.

The glass-enclosed central stacks (not accessible to the public) can be flooded with a mix of Halon 1301 and Inergen fire suppressant gas if fire detectors are triggered. A previous system using carbon dioxide was removed for personnel safety reasons.

After an infestation of the death watch beetle was discovered in 1977, the Beinecke Library helped pioneer the non-toxic method of controlling paper-eating pests by freezing books and documents at −33 °F (−36 °C) for three days. All new acquisitions are given this treatment as a precaution, and the deep freeze method is now widely accepted for pest control in special collections libraries.

== In popular culture ==
- In The Once and Future Spy by Robert Littell, an assassination attempt is made on a CIA analyst at the Beinecke Library.
- In Ninth House by Leigh Bardugo, the Beinecke Library is made a site for cult practice by the Manuscript Society.

== See also ==
- Collectarium of Ląd - Beinecke MS 883, Cistercian manuscript repatriated to Poland in 2026; it is digitized in the library's holdings.
