= Altenberg Abbey =

Cistercian monastery in Germany, 1133–1803

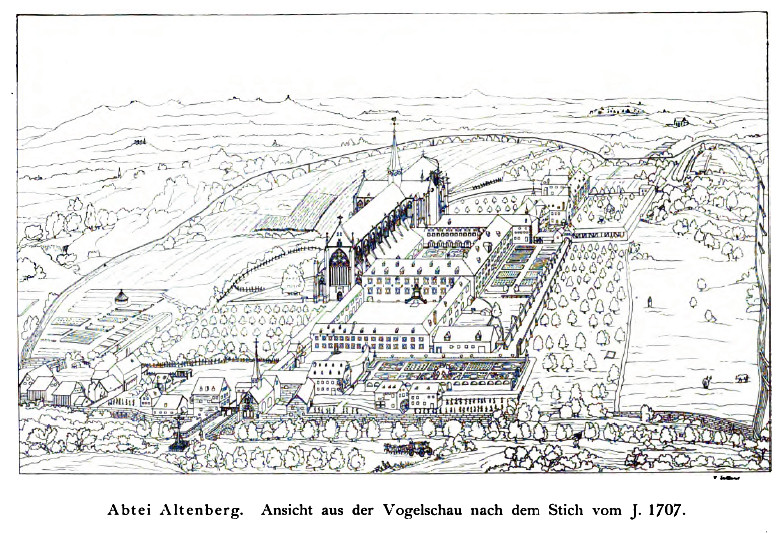
- Altenberg Abbey about 1707, drawing based on a copper engraving by Johann Jakob Sartor

Religion
- Status: dissolved during the secularisation of Germany in 1803

Location
- Location: Altenberg, North Rhine-Westphalia, Germany
- Interactive map of Altenberg Abbey
- Coordinates: 51°3′17″N 7°7′58″E

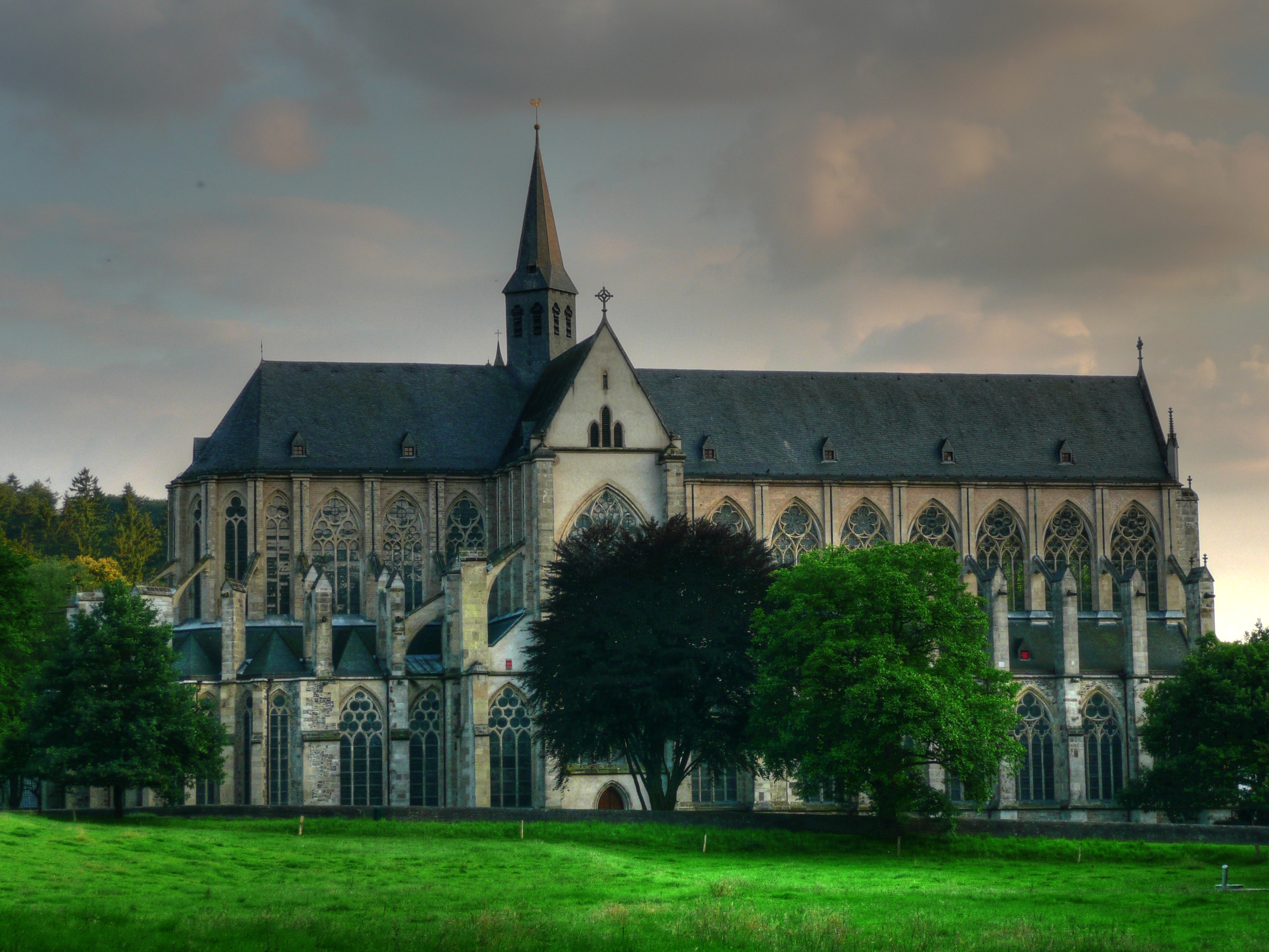
Former abbey church of Altenberg Abbey, now known as the Altenberger Dom

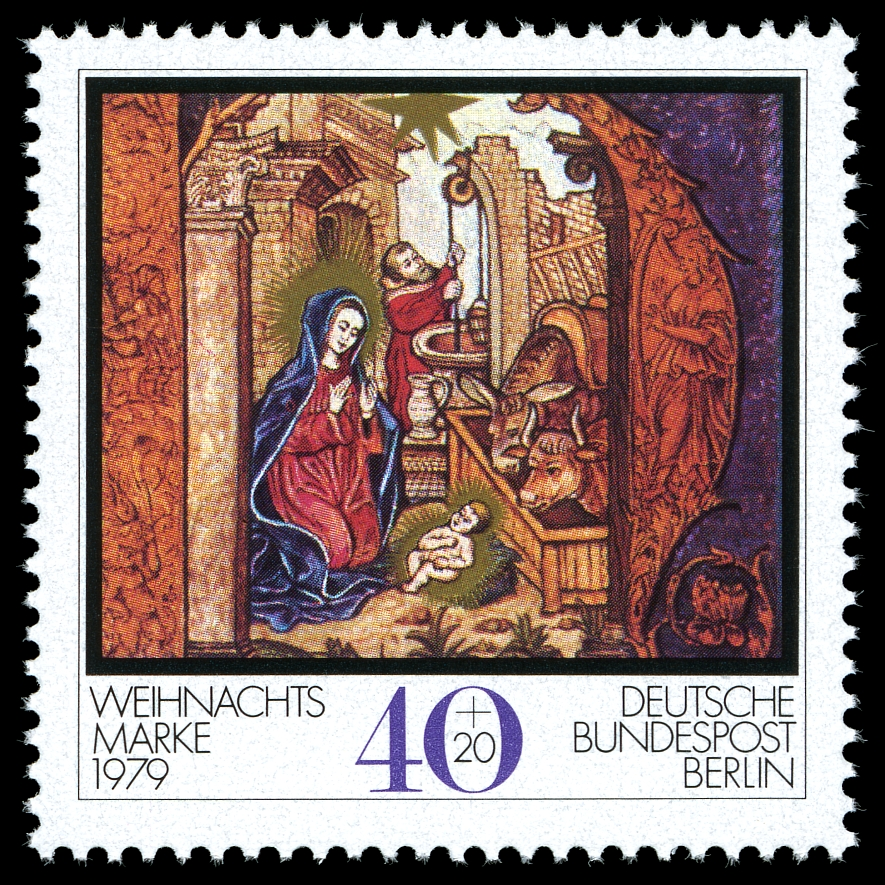
Birth of Christ: detail of the initial letter "H" from a manuscript of Altenberg Abbey, on the Berlin Christmas stamp of 1979

Altenberg Abbey (Abtei Altenberg) (Latin: Vetus Mons) is a former Cistercian monastery in Altenberg, now a part of the municipality of Odenthal in the Bergisches Land, North Rhine-Westphalia, Germany.

== History ==
The abbey was founded in 1133 as a daughter house of Morimond Abbey and settled initially in the old castle of the Counts of Berg, Burg Berge, which the counts had left for Schloss Burg, but moved to the new purpose-built monastery in the valley of the Dhünn in 1153. It flourished sufficiently to undertake the settlement of a number of daughter houses of its own: Mariental Abbey and Wągrowiec Abbey, both in 1143; Ląd Abbey in 1146; Zinna Abbey in 1171; Haina Abbey in 1188; Jüterbog Abbey in 1282; and Derneburg Abbey in 1443.

In 1803 it was dissolved during the secularisation of Germany and fell into ruin. Starting in 1847 under King Frederick William IV of Prussia, a thorough restoration was carried out, and the restored church, known as the Altenberger Dom ("Altenberg Cathedral", although Altenberg was never the seat of a bishopric so this is not technically accurate), is currently an interdenominational church used by both Roman Catholics and Protestants.

== Burials ==
- William VII of Jülich, 1st Duke of Berg
- Gerhard VI of Jülich, Count of Berg and Ravensberg
- Margaret of Ravensberg
- Adolf IV, Count of Berg
- Frederick II (Archbishop of Cologne)
- William IV, Duke of Jülich-Berg
- Sibylle of Brandenburg
- Bruno III of Berg
