= Engelbert I of Berg =

Count Engelbert I of Berg (d. July 1189 in Serbia) ruled the County of Berg from 1160 to 1189. He was the son of Adolf IV of Berg.

Through his loyalty to the German Emperor and the Archbishops of Cologne he succeeded in stabilising the county and increasing its revenues. He took Bensberg Palace, Neu-Windeck and Elberfeld.

In July 1189 he was killed near Kubin while on his way to the Holy Land with the crusade of emperor Frederick Barbarossa.

Engelbert married Margaret of Guelders (born 1157, died 1190?). They had:

- Count Adolf VI of Berg (d. 1218)
- Count Engelbert II of Berg (d. 7 November 1225), otherwise known as Engelbert I, Archbishop of Cologne and as Saint Engelbert.

== Sources ==
- Loud, G.A., ed. (2016). The Crusade of Frederick Barbarossa. Routledge.50
- Lyon, Jonathan R. (2023). Corruption, Protection and Justice in Medieval Europe: A Thousand Year History. Cambridge University Press.

== Literature ==
- Alberic of Troisfontaines (MGH, Scriptores XXIII).
- Annales Rodenses (MGH, Scriptores, XVI).
- Annalista Saxo (MGH, Scriptores VI).
- Gesta Trevirorum (MGH, Scriptores VIII).
- MGH, Diplomata.
- REK I-II. – Rheinisches UB.
- Hömberg, "Geschichte".
- Jackman, "Counts of Cologne".
- Kluger, "Propter claritatem generis". – Kraus, Entstehung.
- Lück, D. "Der Avelgau, die erste fassbare Gebietseinteilung an der unteren Sieg". In: Heimatbuch der Stadt Siegburg I. Ed. H. J. Roggendorf. Siegburg, 1964. Pp. 223–85.
- Lück, D. "In pago Tuizichgowe – Anmerkungen zum Deutzgau". Rechtsrheinisches Köln 3 (1977) 1–9.
- Milz, "Vögte".

Preceded by Adolf IV	Count of Berg; 1160–1189	Succeeded by Adolf VI
