= Adolf IV =

Adolf IV may refer to:

- Adolf IV, Count of Berg, count of Berg from 1132 until 1160
- Adolf IV of Holstein (before 1205–1261)
- Adolf IV of the Marck (1373–1448)
