= Frederick II (archbishop of Cologne) =

Friedrich II of Berg (1120 – 15 December 1158), was Archbishop of Cologne from 1156 until his death in 1158.

== Life ==
He was a son of Adolf IV, Count of Berg, and his second wife Irmgard von Wasserburg. He was the brother of Archbishop Bruno III of Berg, a nephew of Archbishop Bruno II von Berg and an uncle of Archbishop and Saint Engelbert II of Berg.

In 1150 he was elected Bishop von Utrecht but that election was not accepted by Conrad III of Germany and he was never confirmed in the position.

In May 1156 in another disputed election, this time in Cologne, the college elected Gerhard von Bonn while the young Domherren chose Frederick von Berg as archbishop. In the end both parties asked the Emperor Frederick I Barbarossa to decide. The Emperor confirmed Frederick as new archbishop, gave him the Imperial Regalia, and sent him immediately to Rome for his Ordination, where Pope Adrian IV confirmed him.

Frederick has become known for kindness and friendliness. The Xanten Totenbuch describes him as a Prince of the highest humanity.

He was always loyal to the Emperor and accompanied him during the second campaign in Italy. There he died on 15 December 1158 in Pavia following an accidental fall from his horse. He is buried in Altenberg .

Preceded by Arnold II	Archbishop of Cologne; 1156–1158	Succeeded by Rainald of Dassel
