= Sport-Thieme =

German mail-order company

- Type: Private
- Industry: Mail-order business
- Founded: 1 April 1949; 77 years ago
- Founder: Karl-Heinz Thieme
- Headquarters: Grasleben, Lower Saxony, Germany
- Area served: Worldwide
- Key people: Maximilian Hohe, Michael Egerer (Managing Directors)
- Products: Sports articles
- Revenue: approx. €100,000,000 (2023)
- Number of employees: 394 (fiscal year 2024/2025)
- Website: sport-thieme-group.com

Sport-Thieme is a German mail-order company specializing in institutional sports. The company’s headquarters are located in Grasleben, Lower Saxony. Sport-Thieme operates seven sales branches throughout Germany and partners with various regional and national sports associations as well as university sports federations.

== History ==
The company was founded on April 1, 1949, by Karl-Heinz Thieme. In the early 1960s, workshops were established on the company grounds to enable in-house manufacturing. In 1971, expansion of the warehousing area began in the industrial estate of Heidwinkel, a district belonging to Grasleben. Hans-Rudolf Thieme, the founder’s son, introduced an electronic inventory management system in 1979 and joined the management board in 1983. Through the introduction of export strategies starting in 1992 and the launch of an online shop in 1996, Sport-Thieme developed into a leading supplier. After the founder’s death in 1999, the company continued its growth course. Corporate acquisitions contributed significantly to expansion, including Reivo (1992), Olympia-Sporthaus Loydl (2000), Holz-Hoerz (2006), and Automaten Hoffmann (2012, later Sportime). Thieme’s son-in-law, Maximilian Hohe, joined the company in 2011 and assumed management in 2014. In 2023, the group’s sales exceeded the €100 million mark for the first time. At the beginning of 2024, Sport-Thieme introduced a new brand image. As of January 1, 2025, the company consolidated all previous logistics locations at a single new site in Haldensleben, Saxony-Anhalt.

== Subsidiaries and holdings ==
Sport-Thieme GmbH operates internationally and holds stakes in several countries:

- Germany: Holz-Hoerz GmbH (100%);
- Netherlands: Sport-Thieme B.V. (100%);
- Norway: Klubben (Klubben A/S (38.7%), Solves Gate A/S (37.2%));
- Austria: Sport-Thieme GmbH (100%);
- Switzerland: Sport-Thieme AG (100%).
