= Francesc Godoy =

Spanish triathlete

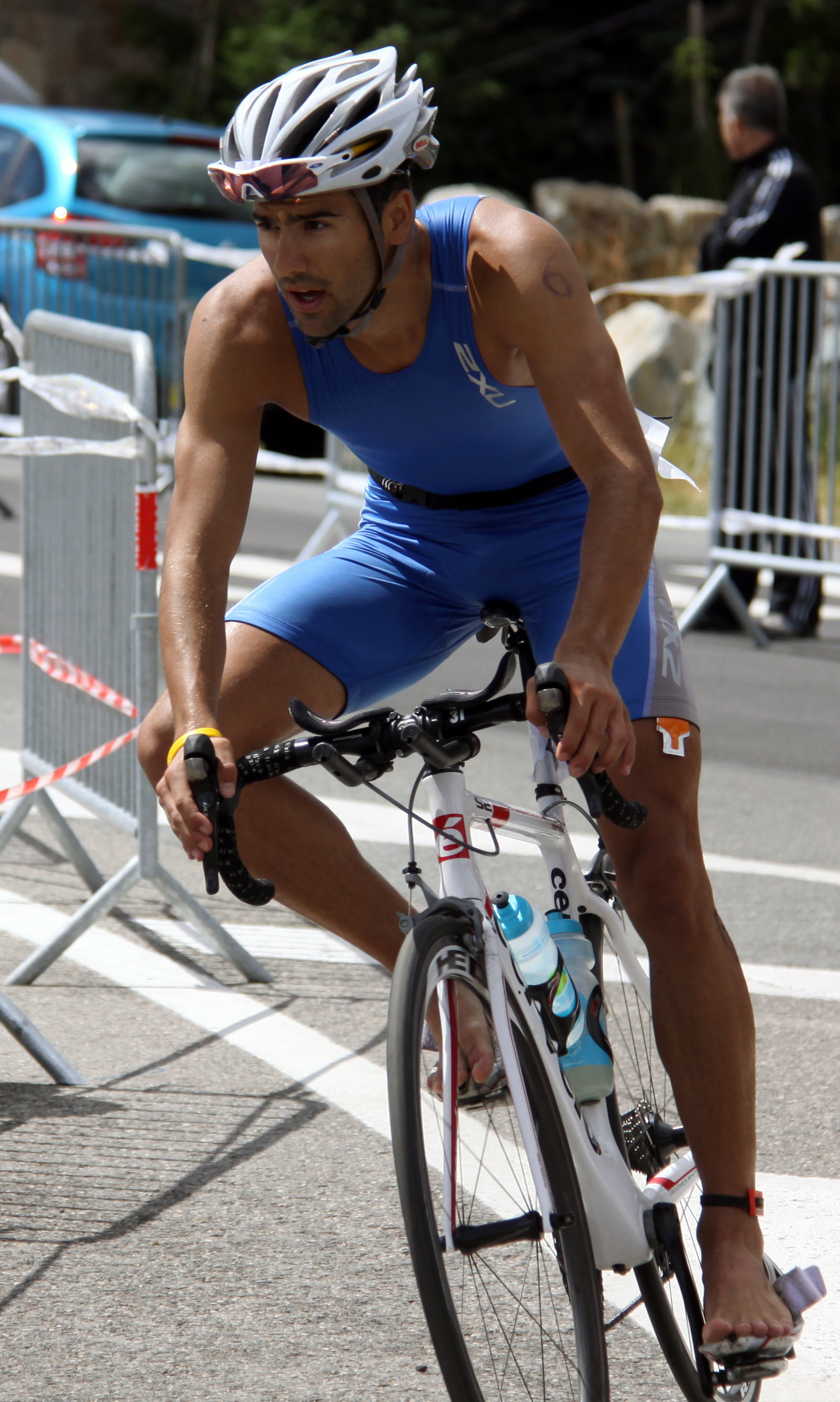
Francesc Godoy arriving at Alpe d'Huez after the 21 spectacular Tour de France bends, 2010.

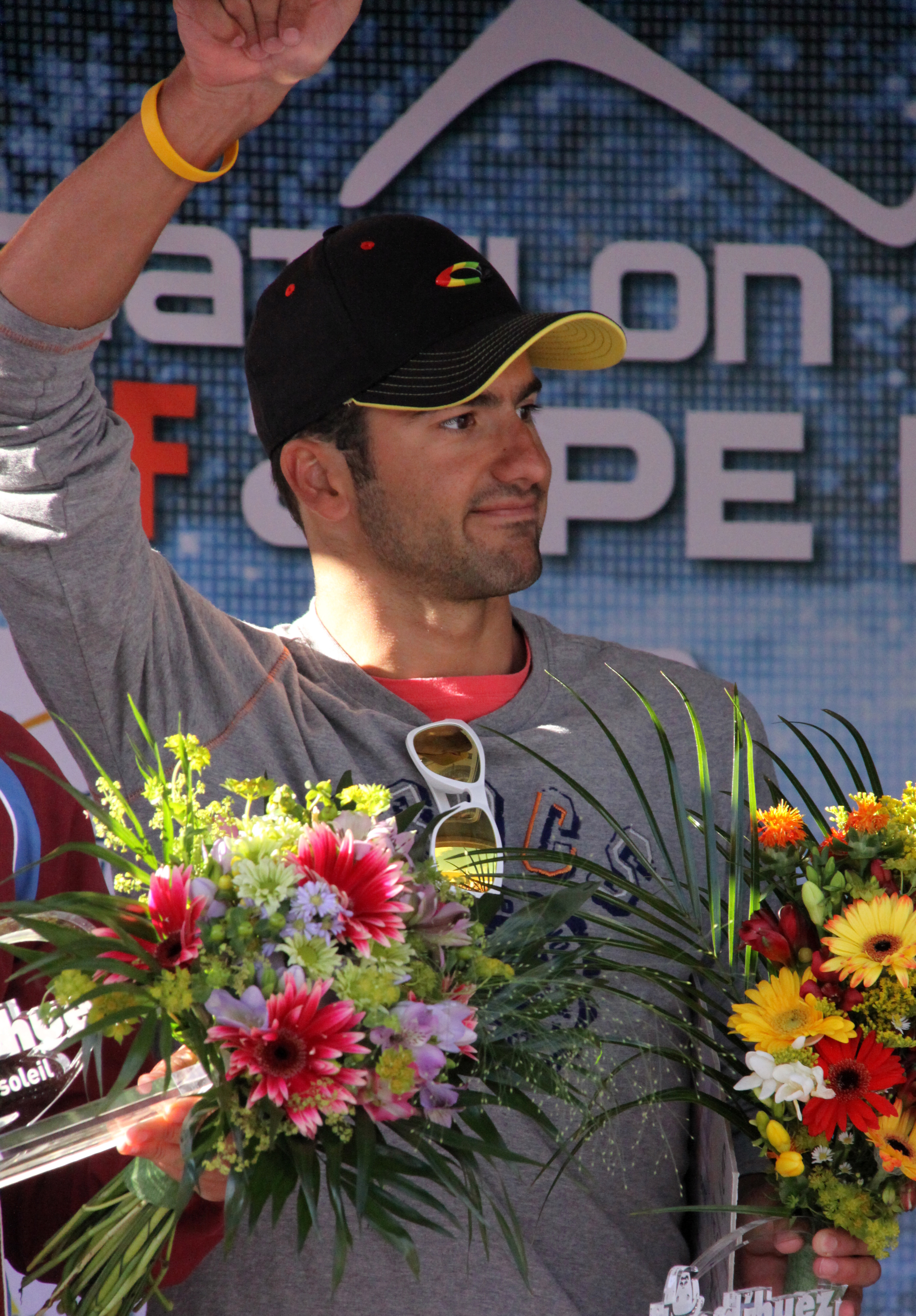
Francesc Godoy with the silver medal at the Triathlon de l'Alpe d'Huez, 2010.

Francesc (Cesc, Francisco) Godoy Contreras (born 17 December 1986 in Barcelona), is a Spanish professional triathlete, U23 National Champion of the years 2006 and 2007, and member of the Spanish National Team 2010.

Among the non ITU competitions, Godoy was especially successful at the Embrunman in 2008, winning the silver medal (short distance), and at the Triathlon EDF Alpe d'Huez of the year 2010, winning silver again. In Spain, Godoy represents the Club de Natació Barcelona (CN Barcelona).

Francesc Godoy's younger sister Anna is also a professional triathlete.

== ITU Competitions ==
In the seven years from 2004 to 2010, Godoy took part in 43 ITU competitions and achieved 12 top ten positions.

The following list is based upon the official ITU rankings and the Athlete's Profile Page. Obviously, however, this ITU list confuses father and son Francesc (Cesc, Francisco) Godoy. The two European Championships of the years 1990 and 1991 must be ascribed to Godoy senior and are not reported below. Unless indicated otherwise, the following events are Olympic Distance Triathlons and belong to the Elite category.

Date	Competition	Place	Rank
2004-05-09	World Championships (Junior)	Madeira	6
2004-07-03	European Championships (Junior)	Lausanne	22
2005-07-23	European Championships (Junior)	Alexandroupoli	21
2005-07-24	European Championships (Junior Relay)	Alexandroupoli	5
2005-09-10	World Championships (Junior)	Gamagori	23
2005-10-15	European Cup	Palermo	12
2006-04-23	European Cup	Estoril	12
2006-07-08	European Championships (U23)	Rijeka	23
2006-07-30	European Cup	Copenhagen	28
2006-09-02	World Championships (U23)	Lausanne	27
2006-10-08	European and Pan American Cup and Iberoamerican Championships	Baeza	12
2006-11-11	African Cup	Mariental	7
2007-03-04	Pan American Cup	San Andres	8
2007-03-17	Pan American Cup and South American Championships	Salinas	3
2007-03-25	Pan American Cup	Lima	2
2007-05-06	BG World Cup	Lisbon	DNF
2007-06-03	BG World Cup	Madrid	35
2007-06-29	European Championships	Copenhagen	47
2007-07-21	European Championships (U23)	Kuopio	5
2007-08-11	BG World Cup	Tiszaújváros	40
2007-08-30	BG World Championships (U23)	Hamburg	DNF
2007-11-03	African Cup	Troutbeck	9
2008-04-19	Premium European Cup	Pontevedra	12
2008-05-04	BG World Cup	Richards Bay	DNF
2008-05-10	European Championships	Lisbon	50
2008-06-05	BG World Championships (U23)	Vancouver	27
2008-09-06	European Championships (U23)	Pulpí	42
2009-04-05	European Cup	Quarteira	41
2009-05-17	Premium European Cup	Pontevedra	19
2009-05-31	Dextro Energy World Championship Series	Madrid	34
2009-06-20	European Championships (U23)	Tarzo Revine	8
2009-09-09	Dextro Energy World Championship Series (U23), Grand Final	Gold Coast	26
2010-01-10	Pan American Cup	Viña del Mar	2
2010-01-15	Pan American Cup	La Paz	6
2010-04-11	European Cup	Quarteira	13
2010-04-17	European Cup	Antalya	4
2010-06-05	Dextro Energy World Championship Series	Madrid	36
2010-06-12	Elite Cup	Hy-Vee	39
2010-07-03	European Championships	Athlone	35
2010-07-10	World Cup	Holten	56
2010-08-08	World Cup	Tiszaújváros	22
2010-08-21	Sprint World Championship	Lausanne	17
2011-01-16	Pan American Cup	La Paz	12

BG = the sponsor British Gas · DNF = did not finish · DNS = did not start
