= Querenhorst =

- Municipality
- Coat of arms

- Location of Querenhorst within Helmstedt district
- Interactive map of Querenhorst
- Location within Germany Location within Lower Saxony
- Coordinates: 52°20′N 10°58′E
- Country: Germany
- State: Lower Saxony
- District: Helmstedt
- Municipal assoc.: Grasleben

Government
  - Mayor: Reinhard Beckmann

Area
  - Total: 4.78 km^{2} (1.85 sq mi)
- Elevation: 112 m (367 ft)

Population (2025-12-31)
  - Total: 495
  - Density: 104/km^{2} (268/sq mi)
- Time zone: UTC+01:00 (CET)
  - Summer (DST): UTC+02:00 (CEST)
- Postal codes: 38368
- Dialling codes: 05358
- Vehicle registration: HE
- Website: www.samtgemeinde-grasleben.de

Querenhorst is a municipality in the district of Helmstedt, in Lower Saxony, Germany.
