= Paul Wynand =

German sculptor (1879–1956)

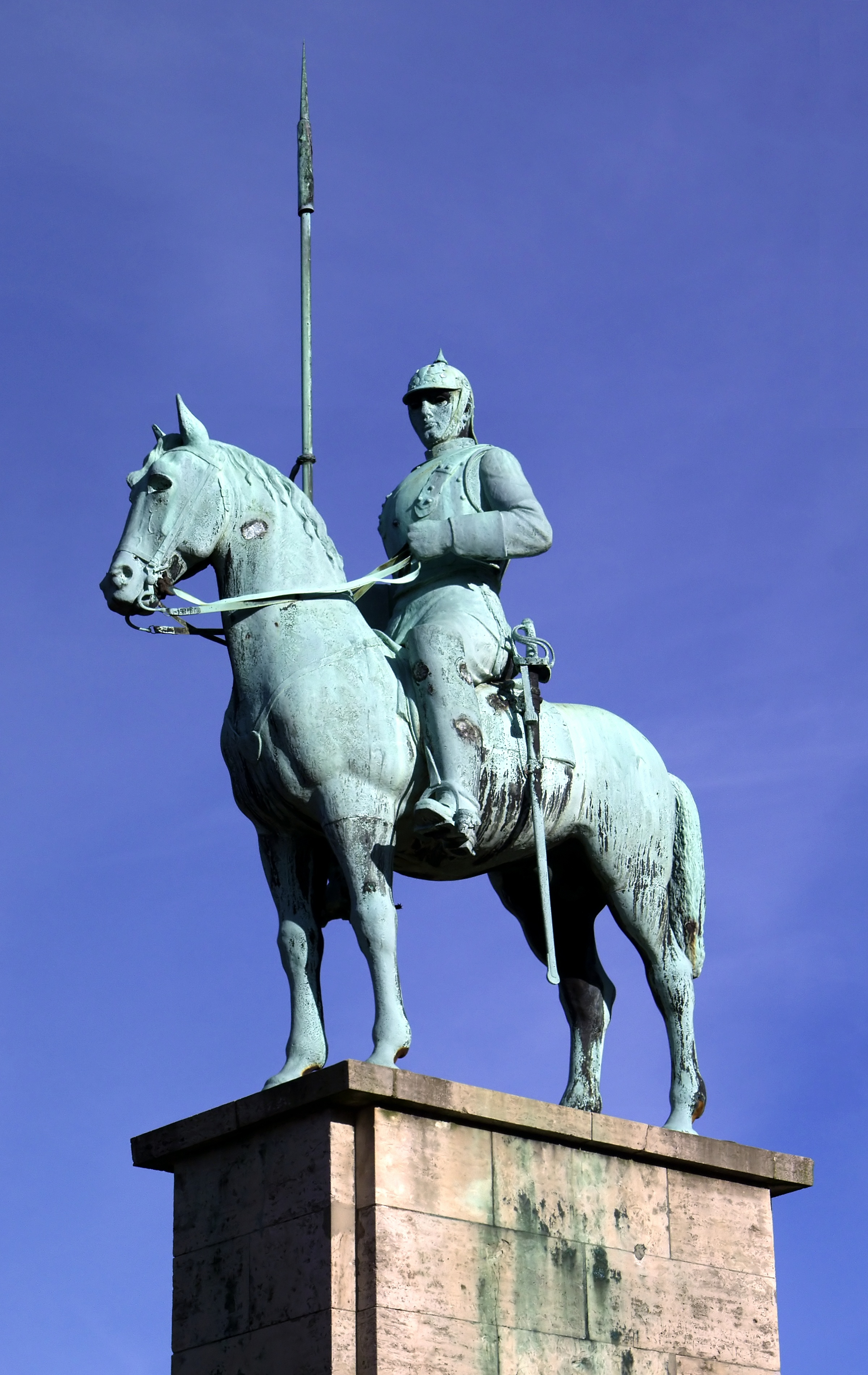
Memorial for the "Kürassier-Regiment Graf Geßler (Rheinisches) Nr. 8" in Deutz, Cologne, 1928

Paul Wynand (30 January 1879 – 2 March 1956, Berlin) was a German sculptor, medalist, and professor, active in the National Socialist era.

== Life ==
Born in Elberfeld, Wynand first completed his studies at the School of Applied Arts in Berlin. From 1900 he studied briefly under Auguste Rodin in Paris.

From 1901 he was a lecturer at the School of Applied Arts in Elberfeld. He worked on the coat of arms on the outer wall of the Council Chamber of Bochum (destroyed during the war). From about 1903, he delivered a number of major designs for Westerwald Pottery, initially mainly for the SP Gerz concern, then later for the Reinhold Merkelbach company and others. This activity continued until the twenties. Four ceramic objects Wynand designed for Reinhold Merkelbach are in the collection of the British Museum.

In 1905 he took a teaching position at the Ceramic School in Hoehr / Westerwald, taking that position over from Ernst Barlach. In 1911 he moved to Berlin in order to continue his work as a sculptor. From 1934 through 1944 he was a teacher of visual arts at the Vereinigte Staatsschulen für freie und angewandete Kunst (United State School for Fine and Applied Art; reorganized in 1939 as the "National School of Fine Arts") in Berlin. In comparison to his more classical work of the 1920s, the characteristics of Wynand's sculpture of the 1930s, particularly the "Falconer" bronze on the grounds of Berlin's Olympic Stadium, come into conformity with the National Socialists' officially approved style.

In 2011 a show of Wynand's work was cancelled due to his "teaching in the service of the Nazi regime".

== Work ==
- equestrian memorial for Engelbert II of Berg at the Schloss Burg in Solingen, 1925
- figures of Venus and Mars for the entry of the Planetarium in Barmen, 1926, destroyed in an Allied bombing raid in May 1943
- equestrian memorial for the "Kürassier-Regiment Graf Geßler (Rheinisches) Nr. 8" in Deutz, Cologne, 1928
- freestanding bronze "Falkner" ("Falconer") for the grounds of the Olympic Stadium in Berlin, 1938
- stone relief of city coat of arms, Bochum City Hall, destroyed during World War II
- bronze statue of Spinnerin, facade of Wupperthal City Hall
- fountain at the Toelleturm (Observation Tower) in Wupperthal, with its original bronze dolphins scrapped for metal
- relief heads for the facade of the "Mourning House" at the Friedhof Heerstraße Cemetery, Charlottenburg-Wilmersdorf, Berlin
