= Henry IV of Limburg =

Henry IV (1195 – 25 February 1247) was the duke of Limburg and count of Berg from 1226 to his death. He was the son of Waleran III, count of Luxembourg and duke of Limburg, and Cunigunda, daughter of Frederick I, Duke of Lorraine.

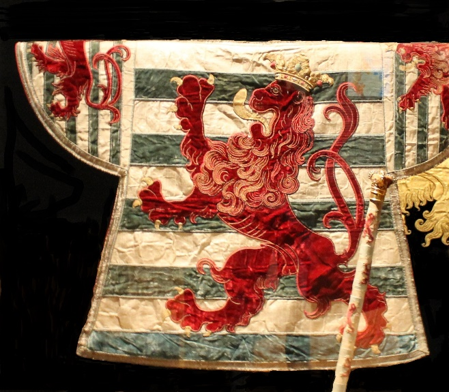
Tabard Herald Duchy Limburg 15th century for the Stattholder-First King at Arms Golden Fleece / Weltliche Schatzkammer Vienna

== County of Berg ==
Originally lord of Montjoie, he married Irmgard of Berg, heiress of the County of Berg, a daughter of the count Adolf VI, who died at the Siege of Damietta in 1218. Irmgard and Henry could not immediately inherit the county, as it was held by Engelbert I, Archbishop of Cologne. Engelbert being the principal adviser of Frederick II, Holy Roman Emperor, he was confirmed in the county for life, paying a rent to Henry and Ermengard. Engelbert was assassinated on 7 November 1225 and Henry inherited Berg, inheriting Limburg a little while later. He then entrusted Montjoie to his brother Waleran, who already held Faulquemont.

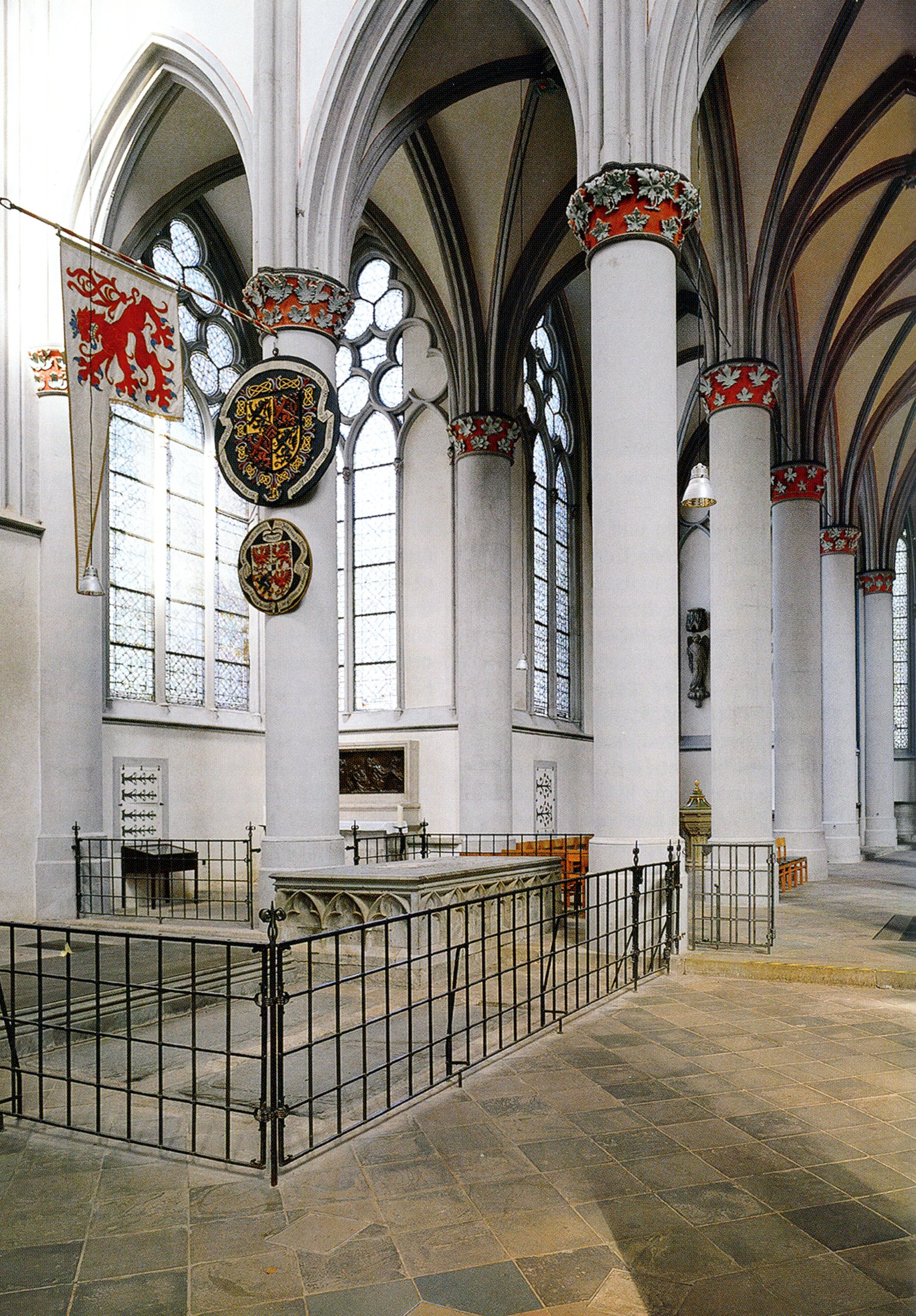
Gravestones of counts and dukes Van Berg. Abbey Church Altenberg

== Isenberg ==
His brother-in-law Frederik of Isenberg was held responsible for the death of the Archbishop of Cologne, Engelbert of Berg Remarkably, through the death of Engelbert, the County of Berg would come to him through his wife Ermgarde, Berg's heiress. After the execution of his brother-in-law Frederik van Isenberg and the death of his sister Sofia a year later, he was concerned about the fate of the orphans. They were brought up at his court in his duchy of Limburg. For the next 20 years he would also support their rights in armed hand against Adolf Earl of Mark, their father's cousin, who took much of their belongings to himself.

== Emperor Frederick II ==
In 1228, took part in the Sixth Crusade to the Holy Land. Upon returning to Germany, he joined the Stedinger Crusade. He also assisted Emperor Frederick II in his fight against the Pope; and was sent by him, along with the Duke of Brabant and the Archbishop of Cologne, as an envoy to England, to obtain for him the hand of the sister of King Henry III of England After their return, they were also present at the wedding ceremonies at Worms on 20 July 1235.

== County Limburg Lenne ==
He also made war on the archbishop of Cologne, Konrad von Hochstaden between 1238 and 1241. He was counted among the partisans of the Hohenstaufen. All the while he helped his two teenage cousins Diederik and Frederik of Isenberg junior with men and money in their battle to reclaim their lost county. The men built a wooden fort for the two cousins as a stronghold and later near a castle on the Schlepenberg on the Lenne, a high fortress they called Limburg. Henry (maternal uncle) and Engelbert of Isenberg bishop of Osnabruck (paternal uncle) stood as chief negotiators for their cousins on 1 May 1243 at the base of the new county of Limburg around the lower reaches of the river Lenne.

== Duchy Limburg ==
Hendrik died on 25 February 1247 and was buried in the abbey of Altenberg. When his granddaughter Duchess Irmgard died in 1282, the battle of Woeringen in 1288 was fought for succession in the Duchy of Limburg. The victor, the Duke of Brabant, merged the duchies of Limburg and Brabant.

Duke Henry and Irmgard of Berg had 2 sons :

- Waleran, his successor in Limburg
- Adolf, his successor in Berg.

== Sources ==
- Loud, Graham A.; Schenk, Jochen, eds. (2017). The Origins of the German Principalities, 1100–1350: Essays by German Historians. Routledge.
- Péporté, P. (2011). Historiography, Collective Memory and Nation-Building in Luxembourg. Brill.
- Droege, G., 'Pfalzgrafschaft, Grafschaften und allodiale Herrschaften zwischen Maas und Rhein in salisch-staufischer Zeit’, Rheinische Vierteljahrsblätter 26 (1961), pp. 1–21.
- Wisplinghoff, E.,Zur Reihenfolge der lothringischen Pfalzgrafen am Ende des 11. Jahrhunderts, in Rheinische Vierteljahrsblätter 28 (1963) pp. 290–293.
- Bleicher, W. Contributions in Hohenlimburgher Heimatblätter fűr den Raum Hagen und Isenlohn. Beiträge zur Landeskunde. Monatsschrift des Vereins fűr Orts- und Heimatkunde Hohenlimburg e.V. Drűck Geldsetzer und Schäfer Gmbh. Iserlohn
- Reuter, Timothy, Germany in the Early Middle Ages 800–1056, New York: Longman, 1991.
- Bernhardt, John W. (2002). Itinerant Kingshiop & Royal Monasteries in Early Medieval Germany, c.936-1075. Cambridge University Press.

Preceded by Waleran III	Duke of Limburg; 1226–1247	Succeeded by Waleran IV
Preceded by Engelbert II	Count of Berg; 1225–1247	Succeeded by Adolf VII
