= Burg Castle (Solingen) =

- Schloss Burg
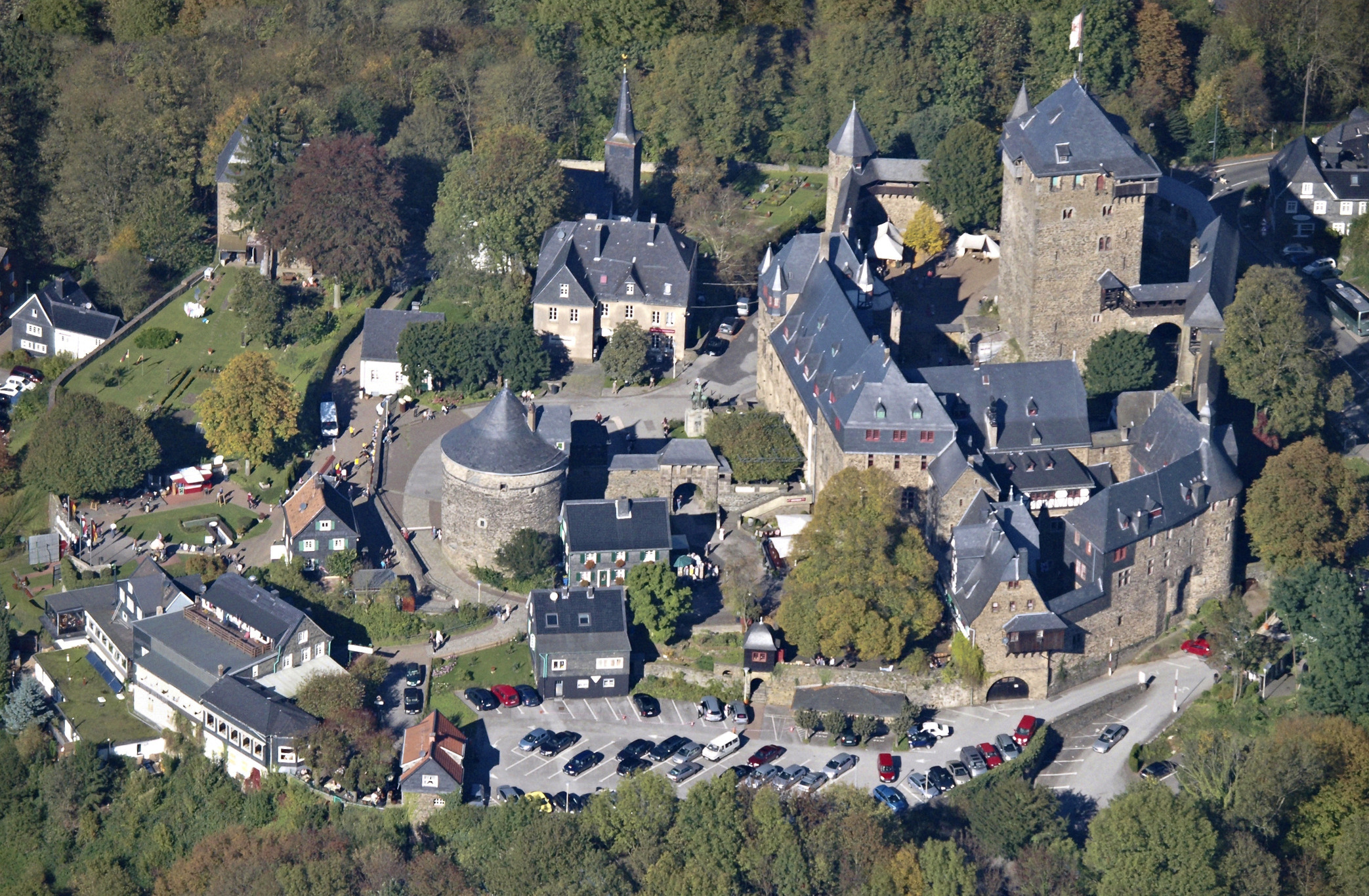
- Burg Castle in 2010

- Location within North Rhine-Westphalia Location within Germany
- Interactive map of the Burg Castle area

General information
- Location: Solingen, Germany
- Coordinates: 51°08′15″N 7°09′10″E

Website
- www.schlossburg.de

Burg Castle (German: Schloss Burg), located in Burg an der Wupper (Solingen), is the largest reconstructed castle in North Rhine-Westphalia, Germany and a popular tourist attraction. Its early history is closely connected to the rise of the Duchy of Berg.

== Early history ==
At the beginning of the 12th century (after 1133), Count Adolf III of Berg built Schloss Burg on a mountain overlooking the river Wupper. The old castle of the counts, Castle Berge in Odenthal near Altenberg, was abandoned. The original name of the new castle was Castle Neuenberge (Newmountain), or in Latin, novus mons, novum castrum, or novi montis castrum. Not until the 15th century, after significant reconstruction as a hunting castle, did it receive its current name reflecting its palatial extension.

His great-grandson, Count Adolf VI of Berg took part in the Fifth Crusade and died during the siege of Damietta in Egypt in 1218. Since the late count had no male descendants his younger brother, Archbishop Engelbert I of Cologne, took over the reign of the county needing two feuds to win the inheritance dispute with Duke Waleran III of Limburg. As count Engelbert II of Berg he built the palas of Burg castle 1218–1225. Engelbert was a very powerful man, not only archbishop and count, but also advisor and chief administrator to the Holy Roman Emperor Frederick II, and guardian and tutor of the later king Henry (VII) of Germany. But he also made enemies and on 7 November 1225, he was murdered by his nephew Friedrich von Isenberg.

The War of succession for the Duchy of Limburg influenced the history of the castle. Count Adolf VIII of Berg participated successfully in the decisive battle of Worringen on 5 June 1288. After the battle, the opposing archbishop of Cologne, Siegfried II of Westerburg, was kept prisoner in the castle. Adolf VIII now was able to proceed to elevate his town, Düsseldorf, to a city and was able to control traffic on the Rhine river. In the 13th and 14th centuries Schloss Burg remained the main residence of the counts of Berg. Five years after King Wenzel elevated Count William to the position of a duke in 1380, Düsseldorf became the capital of the Duchy of Berg. Schloss Burg continued to serve as a hunting castle and was used for ceremonial events, hence it became a "Schloss" (representative castle). Thus in 1496, Maria of Jülich-Berg was engaged as a child to John of Cleves-Mark (later John III, Duke of Cleves). Their wedding took place 14 years later at Burg and led to the unification of the duchies of Jülich-Cleves-Berg. The second daughter of this couple was Anne of Cleves, briefly married to Henry VIII of England.

== Decay ==
In 1632 Swedish soldiers laid siege to the castle. After the Thirty years war, in 1648, Imperial troops destroyed the fortifications of the castle including the keep, walls, and gates. In 1700, the main building was partially reconstructed and subsequently used for administrative purposes. 1849, the castle was sold to be scrapped, decayed, and became a ruin.

== Restoration ==
The architect Gerhard August Fischer from Barmen proposed in 1882 the reconstruction and submitted drawings and plans based on old documents, primarily using the castle's appearance in the 16th century. Since 1890 the castle reconstruction committee has led the restoration of the castle over the next 24 years. Painters from the Kunstakademie Düsseldorf participated. With the erection of the Battery Tower in 1914 the work seemed complete.

On the night of 26 November 1920 a large fire destroyed much of the castle. Subsequently, visitors had to pay entry fees and the money was used to restore and rebuild the castle again. Reconstruction lasted from 1922 to 1925. In 1929 the Engelbert monument by the sculptor Paul Wynand was dedicated to honor the builder and archbishop.

Today's appearance does not exactly match the condition documented by Erich Philipp Ploennies in about 1715. The reconstructed castle of today is a major public attraction. It also contains the Museum of the Bergisches Land. The castle church is popular for weddings. The castle is also home to the Memorial for Deportation and the Memorial of the German Eastern Provinces with church bells from Königsberg and Breslau. In addition, commercial shops for souvenirs are located on the grounds.

The surroundings offer hiking trails to the forests and to Unterburg, that is where the village is located, at the foot of the mountain. There you can buy the Burger Brezel, a local pretzel specialty; the pretzel bakers even have a monument. A chairlift (Seilbahn) connects Unterburg and the castle.

Burg used to be an independent township until it became part of Solingen in 1975.

== Trivia ==
Linguistically, "Schloss Burg" would be translated as "palace castle" - a tautology, yet in German "Schloss" refers to a representative building and "Burg" to a fortification - an oxymoron.

== Literature ==
- Dirk Söchting: Schloss Burg an der Wupper. Sutton Verlag 2004, 96 Seiten, 124 Abbildungen, ISBN 3-89702-761-5.
- Dirk Soechting: Schloss Burg als Postkarte, Verlag Ute Kierdorf, Remscheid 1980, ISBN 3-922055-26-5.
- Elke Lutterbach: Schloss Burg an der Wupper (Ritterburgen Band 1). J.P. Bachem Verlag 2003, 144 Seiten, 250 Abbildungen, ISBN 3-7616-1699-6
