= Grasleben (Samtgemeinde) =

Samtgemeinde in Lower Saxony

- Samtgemeinde
- Location of Grasleben within Helmstedt district
- Interactive map of Grasleben
- Location within Germany Location within Lower Saxony
- Coordinates: 52°19′N 11°01′E
- Country: Germany
- State: Lower Saxony
- District: Helmstedt
- Seat: Grasleben
- Subdivisions: 4 municipalities

Area
  - Total: 45.36 km^{2} (17.51 sq mi)

Population (2025-12-31)
  - Total: 4,467
  - Density: 98.48/km^{2} (255.1/sq mi)
- Time zone: UTC+01:00 (CET)
  - Summer (DST): UTC+02:00 (CEST)
- Website: www.samtgemeinde-grasleben.de

Grasleben is a Samtgemeinde ("collective municipality") in the district of Helmstedt, in Lower Saxony, Germany. Its seat is in the village Grasleben.

The Samtgemeinde Grasleben consists of the following municipalities:

1. Grasleben
2. Mariental
3. Querenhorst
4. Rennau
