= Mariental Abbey =

Monastery in Mariental, Germany

Coordinates: 52°16′33″N 10°59′06″E

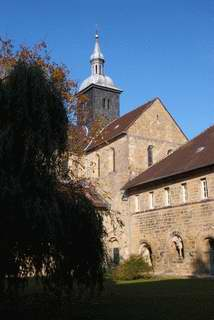
Former abbey church

Mariental Abbey (German: Kloster Mariental), in the present-day municipality of Mariental in Lower Saxony, Germany, is a former Cistercian monastery founded in 1138, now used and owned by a Lutheran congregation of the Evangelical Lutheran Church in Brunswick.

== History ==
The monastery was founded by Friedrich II von Sommerschenburg (c. 1100 – 1162), Count palatine (Pfalzgraf) of Saxony. It then was a daughter house of Altenberg Abbey of the filiation of Morimond. The initial complement consisted of twelve monks from Altenberg under an abbot (Bodo) from Amelungsborn Abbey. The Augustinian nunnery of Marienberg in nearby Helmstedt was subsequently established in 1176. When the Sommerschenburg family became extinct in 1179, Mariental Abbey with its possessions were seized by the Welf duke Henry the Lion.

The abbey soon achieved great prosperity: its estates extended as far as Magdeburg, Jüterbog and Braunschweig. In 1232 it established a daughter house of its own, Hude Abbey. However, at the end of the 14th century it entered a phase of steady decline.

The monastery was dissolved in 1569 as a consequence of the Protestant Reformation. A Lutheran school had been set up in the premises in 1542, operating until 1745. A seminary for the training of teachers was also established here, and this continued until 1773, when it was transferred to Helmstedt.

The buildings today belong to the Braunschweigische Vereinigte Kloster- und Studienfonds, while the church has become the Protestant parish church of Mariental.
