= Duchy of Berg =

State of the Holy Roman Empire (1101–1806)

Coordinates: 51°12′26″N 6°48′45″E

County (Duchy) of Berg Grafschaft (Herzogtum) Berg (German) Graafschap (Hertogdom) Berg (Dutch)
- 1101–1806
- Left: Arms of Bergins (from around 1225), who ruled the Duchy of Berg last Right: Coat of arms of the Duke of Berg

- Map of the Lower Rhenish–Westphalian Circle around 1560, Duchy of Berg highlighted in red
- Status: Duchy
- Capital: Schloss Burg (1101–1280); Düsseldorf (1280–1806)
- Common languages: German
- Government: Absolute monarchy
- Duke of Berg
  - 1360–1380: Wilhelm II (first duke)
  - 1809-1813: Napoléon Louis Bonaparte (Grand Duke)
- Historical era: Middle Ages
  - Emergence from Lotharingia: 1101
  - Split with County of Mark: 1160
  - United with County of Jülich: 1348
  - United with County of Mark and Duchy of Cleves: → 1521
  - United with Palatinate-Neuburg and the Electorate of the Palatinate: 1609 and 1690
  - Elevated to Grand Duchy: 15 March 1806
Preceded by	Succeeded by
Lotharingia	Grand Duchy of Berg

The Duchy of Berg (German: Herzogtum Berg [bɛʁk]) was a state—originally a county, later a duchy—in the Rhineland of Germany. Its capital was Düsseldorf. It existed as a distinct political entity from the early 12th to the 19th centuries. It was a member state of the Holy Roman Empire.

The name of the county lives on in the modern geographic term Bergisches Land, often misunderstood as bergiges Land (hilly country).

== History ==
=== Ascent ===
The Counts of Berg emerged in 1101 as a junior line of the dynasty of the Ezzonen, which traced its roots back to the 9th-century Kingdom of Lotharingia, and in the 11th century became the most powerful dynasty in the region of the lower Rhine.

In 1160, the territory split into two portions, one of them later becoming the County of the Mark, which returned to the possession of the family line in the 16th century. The most powerful of the early rulers of Berg, Engelbert II of Berg died in an assassination on November 7, 1225. In 1280 the counts moved their court from Schloss Burg on the Wupper river to the town of Düsseldorf. Count Adolf VIII of Berg fought on the winning side in the Battle of Worringen against Guelders in 1288.

The power of Berg grew further in the 14th century. The County of Jülich united with the County of Berg in 1348, and in 1380 the Emperor Wenceslaus elevated the counts of Berg to the rank of dukes, thus originating the Duchy of Jülich-Berg.

=== Problems of succession ===
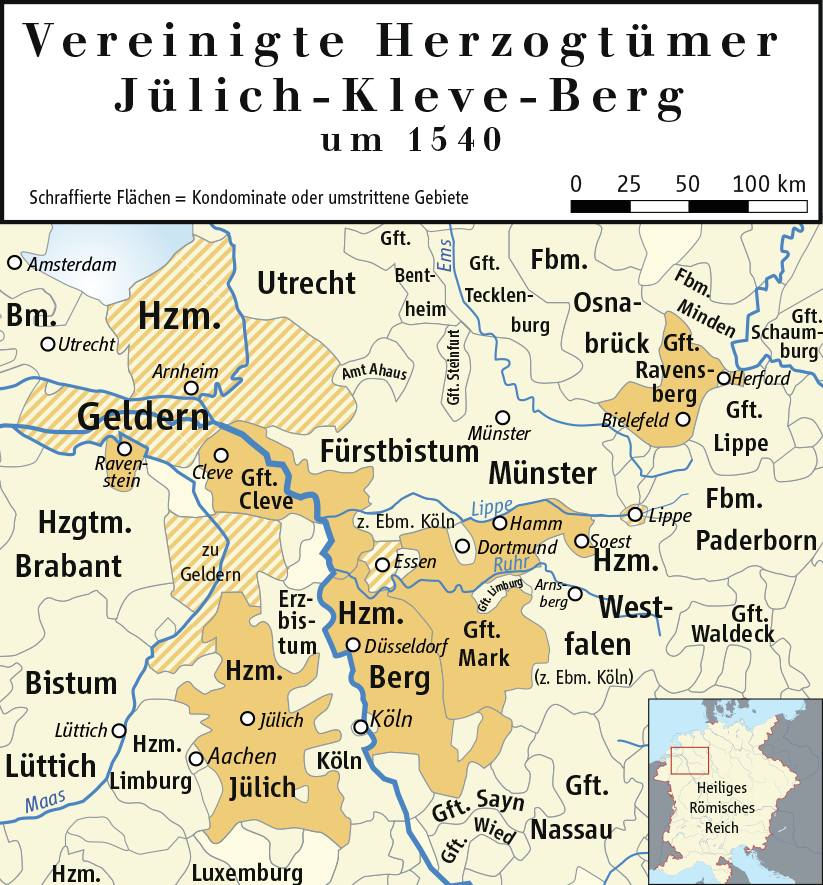
Map of the United Duchies of Jülich-Cleves-Berg around 1540

In 1509, John III, Duke of Cleves, made a strategic marriage to Maria von Geldern, daughter of William IV, Duke of Jülich-Berg, who became heiress to her father's estates: Jülich, Berg and the County of Ravensberg, which under the Salic laws of the Holy Roman Empire caused the properties to pass to the husband of the female heir (women could not hold property except through a husband or a guardian). With the death of her father in 1511 the Dukes of Jülich-Berg became extinct, and the estate thus came under the rule of John III, Duke of Cleves — along with his personal territories, the County of the Mark and the Duchy of Cleves (Kleve) in a personal union. As a result of this union the dukes of the United Duchies of Jülich-Cleves-Berg controlled much of present-day North Rhine-Westphalia, with the exception of the clerical states of the Archbishop of Cologne and of the Bishop of Münster.

William the Rich was the second duke of the united Julich-Cleves-Berg. He introduced the Gregorian Calendar into the duchies.

However, the new ducal dynasty also became extinct in 1609, when the last duke died insane. This led to a lengthy dispute over succession to the various territories before the partition of 1614: the Count Palatine of Neuburg, who had converted to Catholicism, annexed Jülich and Berg; while Cleves and Mark fell to John Sigismund, Elector of Brandenburg, who subsequently also became Duke of Prussia.

=== Wittelsbach Rule ===
Wolfgang Wilhelm, Count Palatine of Neuburg, became duke. He was a member of the powerful House of Wittelsbach, which ruled Bavaria and the Electoral Palatinate. During his reign, Düsseldorf served as his center of court on occasion.

During the Thirty Years' War, even though there were no significant battles around Berg, the territories still had to deal with the stresses of war. At the end of the Thirty Years' War, Wolfgang Wilhelm tried to spread Catholicism in the duchies. Frederick William, Elector of Brandenburg, still claimed the Duchy of Berg, and declared war, claiming to be the defender of protestants in Berg. This led to the Düsseldorf Cow War. In the following years however, tension over Berg between Neuburg and Brandenburg greatly decreased.

Upon the extinction of the senior Wittelsbach dynasty ruling the Electorate of the Palatinate in 1685, the Neuburg line inherited the electorate and generally made Düsseldorf its capital. Elector Charles III Philipp disliked Düsseldorf, because the estates there did not want to grant the funds he demanded. As such, he moved his capital from Düsseldorf to Mannheim, where it remained until the Elector Palatine, Charles Theodore, inherited the Electorate of Bavaria in 1777.

In the 17th and 18th centuries, the Duchy of Berg became an early centre of continental industrialisation, with Elberfeld and Barmen developing into a proto-industrial hub of textile production, while Solingen and Remscheid specialised in ironmongery, particularly in the manufacture of blades.

=== French revolution, Grand Duchy of Berg ===
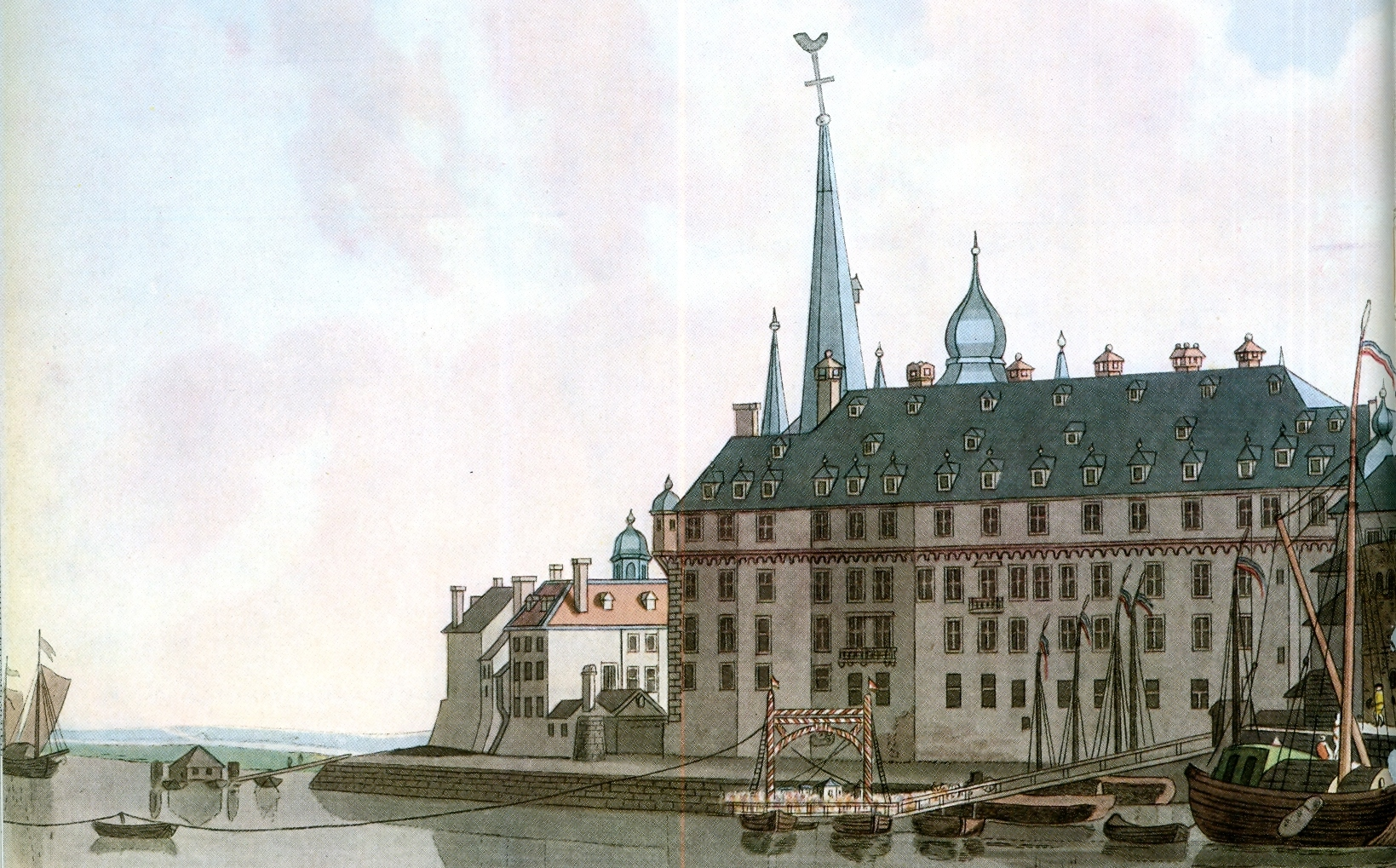
The ducal palace at Düsseldorf, 1798 copper engraving by Laurenz Janscha. The palace burnt down in 1872.

The French occupation (1794–1801) and annexation (1801) of Jülich (French: Juliers) during the French revolutionary wars separated the two duchies of Jülich and Berg, and in 1803 Berg separated from the other Bavarian territories and came under the rule of a junior branch of the Wittelsbachs. In 1806, in the reorganization of the German lands occasioned by the end of the Holy Roman Empire, Berg became the Grand Duchy of Berg, under the rule of Napoleon's brother-in-law, Joachim Murat. Murat's arms combined the red lion of Berg with the arms of the Duchy of Cleves. The anchor and the batons came to the party due to Murat's positions as Grand Admiral and as Marshal of the Empire. As the husband of Napoleon's sister Caroline Bonaparte, Murat also had the right to use the imperial eagle.

In 1809, one year after Murat's promotion from Grand Duke of Berg to King of Naples, Napoleon's young nephew, Prince Napoleon Louis Bonaparte (1804–1831, elder son of Napoleon's brother Louis Bonaparte, King of Holland) became the Grand Duke of Berg; French bureaucrats administered the territory in the name of the child. The Grand Duchy's short existence came to an end with Napoleon's defeat in 1813 and the peace settlements that followed.

=== Province of Jülich-Cleves-Berg ===
In 1815, after the Congress of Vienna, Berg became part of a province of the Kingdom of Prussia: the Province of Jülich-Cleves-Berg. In 1822 this province united with the Grand Duchy of the Lower Rhine to form the Rhine Province.

== Rulers of Berg ==
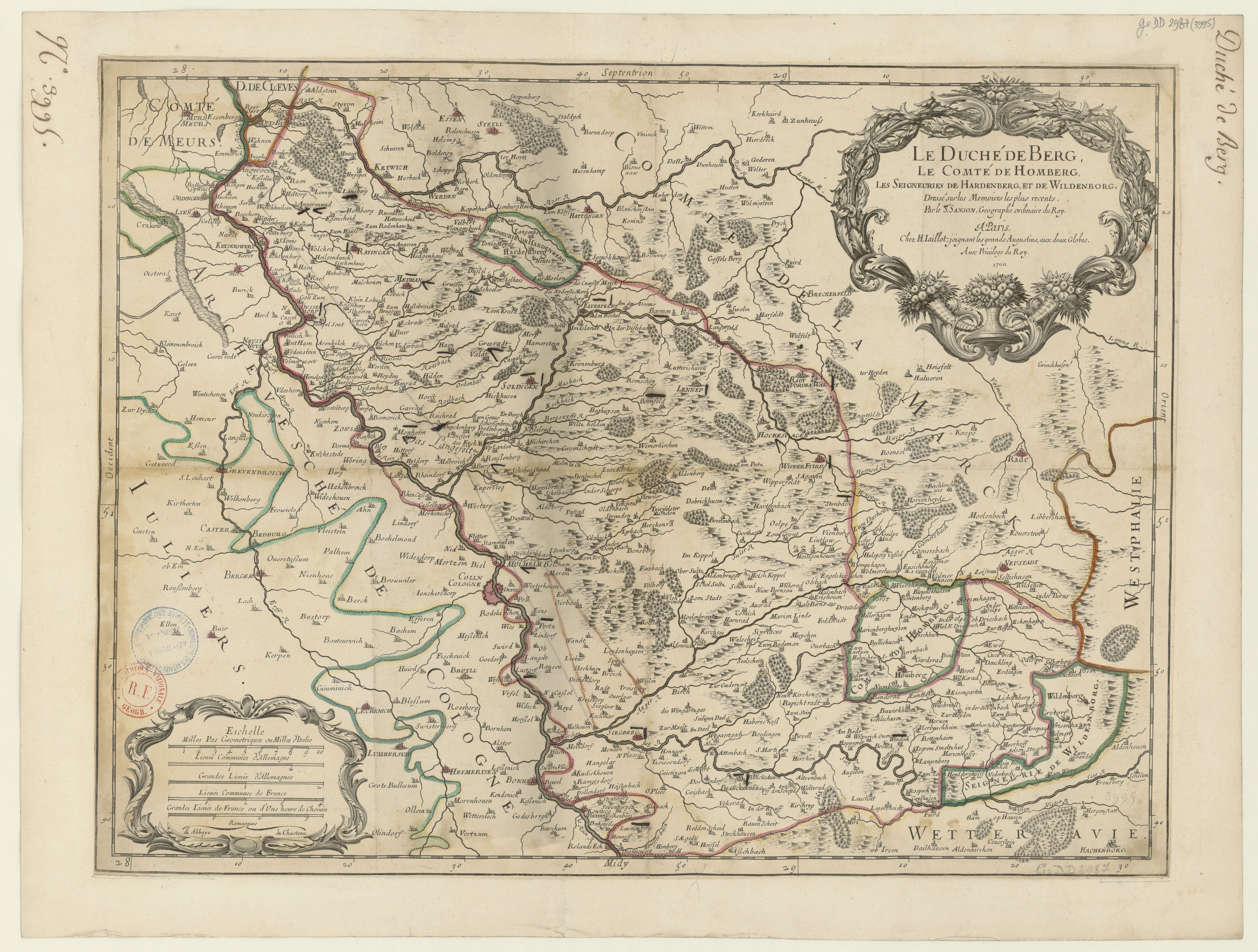
Map of the Duchy of Berg by French cartographer Nicolas Sanson in 1696.

The Grand Duchy of Berg in 1812.

=== House of Ezzonen ===
- Hermann I "Pusillus", Count Palatine of Lotharingia
- Adolf I of Lotharingia, Vogt of Deutz
- Adolf II of Lotharingia, Vogt of Deutz

=== House of Berge ===
- 1077–1082 Adolf I of Berg, 1st Count of Berg
- 1082–1093 Adolf II of Berg-Hövel (Huvili), Count of Berg
- 1093–1132 Adolf III, Count of Berg
- 1132–1160 Adolf IV, Count of Berg
  - c.1140-1148 Adolf V, Count of Berg
- 1160–1189 Engelbert I, Count of Berg
- 1189–1218 Adolf VI, Count of Berg
- 1218–1225 Engelbert II of Berg, Archbishop of Cologne, Regent of Berg
- 1218–1248 Irmgard, heiress of Berg, marries in 1217 Henry IV, Duke of Limburg

=== House of Limburg ===
- 1218–1247 Henry IV Duke of Limburg, Count of Berg
- 1247–1259 Adolf VII Count of Limburg, Count of Berg
- 1259–1296 Adolf VIII
- 1296–1308 William I
- 1308–1348 Adolf IX

=== House of Jülich(-Heimbach), Counts ===
– in union with Ravensberg –

- 1348–1360 Gerhard
- 1360–1380 Wilhelm II; became duke in 1380

=== House of Jülich(-Heimbach), Dukes ===
– in union with Ravensberg (except 1404–1437) and after 1423 in union with the duchy of Jülich –

- 1380–1408 William I
- 1408–1437 Adolf
- 1437–1475 Gerhard
- 1475–1511 Wilhelm II

=== House of La Marck, Dukes ===
– from 1521 a part of the United Duchies of Jülich-Cleves-Berg–

- 1511–1539 Johann
- 1539–1592 William III
- 1592–1609 Johann Wilhelm I

=== House of Wittelsbach, Dukes ===
– in union with Jülich und Palatinate-Neuburg, from 1690 also with the Electorate of the Palatinate, from 1777 also with Bavaria –

- 1614–1653 Wolfgang Wilhelm
- 1653–1679 Philipp Wilhelm
- 1679–1716 Johann Wilhelm II
- 1716–1742 Karl Phillip
- 1742–1799 Karl Theodor
- 1799–1806 Maximilian Josef
  - 1803–1806 William of Palatinate-Zweibrücken-Birkenfeld-Gelnhausen, Duke in Bavaria (administrator)

=== French Grand Dukes ===
Coat of arms of Joachim Murat as Grand Duke of Berg and Cleves

- 1806–1808 Joachim Murat
- 1808–1809 Napoléon Bonaparte
- 1809–1813 Napoléon Louis Bonaparte (under the regency of Napoléon Bonaparte)

=== Genealogy of the House of Berg in Cleves, Julich, Mark and Berg ===
Genealogy of the House of Berg in Cleves, Julich, Mark and Berg

House of Berg

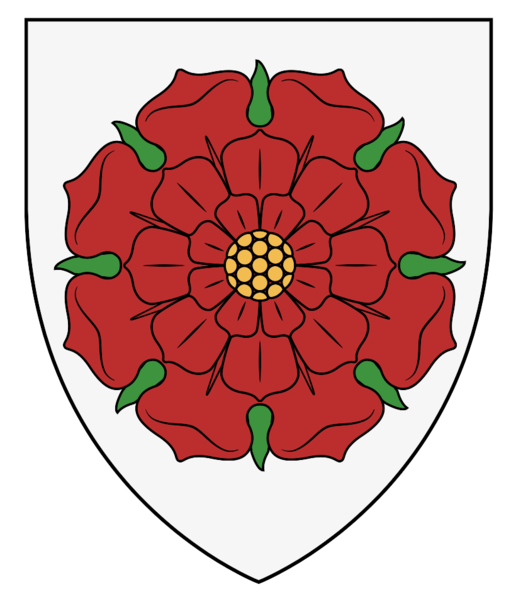
COUNT OR DUKE OF BERG	COUNT OR DUKE OF CLEVES	COUNT OR DUKE OF JŰLICH	ISENBERG/LIMBURG	COUNTS OF THE MARK	COUNTS OF RAVENSBURG	COUN OR DUKE OF GELDERLAND
Herman I Count Palatine of Lorraine; 985–996	Otto II; Emperor; 973–983
Adolf of Lorraine	Ezzo; Count Palatine of Lorraine; 996–1034 ancestor of Ezzonids	Mathilde d. 1025
Adolf	Richeza d. 1063	Mieszko II; Duke of Poland; 1025–1031; 1032–1034
Adolf I Count of Berg; 1077–c.1082	Casimir I the Restorer; Duke of Poland; 1034, rebellion 1038/40–1058
Adolf II of Berg; Count of Berg c.1082–c.1090	House of Wassenberg
Adolf III of Berg; Count of Berg c.1090–1106	Gerard I Flamens(ca. 970 - † bef. 1042)	Rütger I Count of Cleves d.<1092 House of Wassenberg
Adolf IV of Berg; Count of Berg; 1106–1161 or	Bruno II von Berg; Archbishop of Cologne; 1131–1137	Counts and dukes of Guelders	Arnold; Count of Cleves (<1092–c.1147)
Engelbert I Count of Berg; 1161–1189	Friedrich II of Berg; Archbishop of Cologne; 1156–1158	Adolf V d. 1148 (at Damascus)	Bruno III of Berg; Archbishop of Cologne; 1191–1193 d. 1196/1200	Eberhard I, Count of Berg-Altena (and IV); 1140 – 1180 eastern part of Berg becomes c. of Altena	Dietrich III; Count of Cleves c.1147–c.1172
Adolf VI; Count of Berg; 1189–1218	Engelbert II the Holy; Archbishop of Cologne; 1216–1225	Walter of Hennebach d.<1172	Arnold of Altena (1166 - 1209) 1st count of Isenberg, ancestor of counts of Limburg Hohenlimburg and Broich	Adolf of Altena (1168 - 1220) Archbishop of Cologne, 1193 - 1205, 1212 - 1214	Friedrich I of Altena (1173–1198) count of Berg-Altena, which renamed C. of Mark, ancestor of House of La Marck	Dietrich IV; Count of Cleves (1172–1193)
Irmgard of Berg d.1248	Henry IV (Arlon); Duke of Limburg; 1226–1246; 1/2 br. was Henry V, Count of Luxembourg anc. of Imperial House of Luxembourg	Eberhard d. 1218	Eberhard II (born 1180, died 1209) count of Altena and Isenberg	Frederick of Isenberg (1193 – 1226) attained re murder of Archb. of Engelbert II of Cologne	Dietrich III, Bishop of Münster (< 1180 - 1226)	Engelbert of Altena-Isenberg (< 1200 - 1250); B. of Osnabruck (1224-dep. 1226 for Engelbert II of Berg's assassination, rehab. 1238-1250)	Adolf I, Count of Mark (1194? - 1249)	Dietrich V Count of Cleves; 1193–1260
Adolf VII (1220 † 1259); Count of Berg	Waleran IV († 1279); Duke of Limburg	William III, Count of Jülich; 1207-1219 heir of uncle William II	Dietrich I of Isenberg before 1215–1301; 1st Count of Limburg (Counts of Limburg Hohenlimburg and Broich)	Friedrich of Altena (< 1220 - > 1243); C. of Limburg-Isenberg	Engelbert I, Count of Mark(d. 1277); C. of the Mark, 1249, C. of Altena, 1269	Otto, (1212-1269) C. of Altena	Dietrich VI; Count of Cleves; 1260–1275
Ermengarde († 1283)	Reginald I Count of Guelders (Wassenberg)	William IV, Count of Jülich (c. 1210 – 1278)	Johann of Isenberg-Limburg (< 1246 - < 1277)	Eberhard, Count of Mark (c. 1255–1308)	Dietrich VII (1256–1305); Count of Cleves,(1275–1305)
Adolf VIII of Berg († 1296) Count of Berg	William I († 1308) Count of Berg	Henry of Windeck († 1292)	Walram, Count of Jülich (1240/45 – 1297)	Gerhard V, C. of Jülich (bef 1250 – 1328), count 1297	from here desc. LIMBURG-STIRUM (see below)	Engelbert II, Count of Mark (1275 – 1328)	Adolf II (bishop of Liège) (1288 – 1344)	Dietrich VIII (c. 1291 – 1347); Count of Cleves (1311–1347)	Otto, Count of Cleves (1278 – 1310); Count of Cleves (1305–1311)	John (1293-1368); Count of Cleves (1347–1368)
Adolf IX of Berg († 1348) Count of Berg	Margaret of Berg-Windeck d.< 1339 m. Otto IV, Count of Ravensberg	Walram; Archbishop of Cologne; 1332–1349	William; V as count, I as margrave & duke (c. 1299 – 1361)	Eberhard I (d. about 1378), Count of Arenberg see below House of Marck-Arenberg/Bouillon/Lummey	Engelbert (1304–1368), Prince-Bishop of Liège 1345–1364, Archbishop of Cologne 1364–68	Adolf II, Count of Mark (d.1347)	Margaret of Cleves, Countess of the Marck (c. 1310 – after 1348)
Margaret of Ravensberg	Gerhard VI count of Berg, Ravensberg	William VI; II duke of Jülich ∞ Maria, Duchess of Guelders	Engelbert III (1333–1391), C. of the Mark, 1347	Adolf III (1334–1394), Absp. of Cologne, 1363-64, C. of Cleves, 1368
William VII of Jülich, 1st Duke of Berg duke of Berg, count of Ravensberg	William duke of Guelders, III of Jülich ∞ Katherine of Bavaria	Reinald IV duke of Guelders, Jülich	Joanna of Jülich ∞ John V lord of Arkel	Adolph I (1373–1448), his successor in Cleves, 1394 and also in Marck, 1398. Duke of Cleves, 1417	Dietrich (1374–1398), his successor in Marck.	Gerhard († 1461), de facto Count of the Marck, but not allowed to use the title.
Adolf (c. 1370 – 1437); Count of Ravensberg, 1395-1403; Duke of Berg, 1408; Duke of Jülich, 1423	William VIII (c. 1380 – 1428) count of Ravensberg, 1403	Marie of Harcourt (daughter of John VI count of Harcourt)	Maria van Arkel ∞ John II lord of Egmond	John I (1419–1481); Duke of Cleves, 1448; Count of the Mark, 1448/1461	Elizabeth of Nevers, daughter of John II, Count of Nevers(Valois-Burgundy)	Adolph of Cleves, Lord of Ravenstein (1425–1492) m. 1453, to Beatrice of Portugal
Rupert (d. 1431)	Gerhard VII duke of Jülich-Berg, count of Ravensberg	Arnold duke of Guelders; HOUSE OF EGMONT	John II (1458-1521); Duke of Cleves & Count of the Mark, 1521	Engelbert, Count of Nevers (1462-1506); Count of Nevers, 1491upon death of his maternal grandfather John II, Count of Nevers	Philip of Cleves (1467–1505); Bishop of Nevers, Amiens and Autun
William; IV duke of Jülich-Berg, count of Ravensberg ∞ Sibylle of Brandenburg
Maria of Jülich-Berg	John III (1490-1539); Duke of Cleves & Count of the Mark, 1511; Duke of Jülich & Berg, Count of Ravensberg, 1521; HOUSE OF LA MARCK	Adolf (1498–1525), appointed by his father's cousin Philip of Cleves, Lord of Ravenstein and Wijnendale, as his successor, but died before Philip did in 1528	Charles II, Count of Nevers (d.1521)m.Marie of Albret, Countess of Rethel
Sibylle d.1554	John Frederick I the Magnanimous; Elector of Saxony; 1532–1547 d.1554	Anne of Cleves d.1557	Henry VIII; King of England; 1509–1547; King of Ireland; 1541–1547	William I the Rich; Duke of Cleves–Jülich– Mark–Berg– Ravensberg; 1539–1592	Maria of Austria d.1581 d. of Ferdinand I, Holy Roman Emperor	Francis I Count of Nevers, 1521-39; Duke of Nevers, 1539-62
John William; Duke of Cleves–Jülich– Mark–Berg– Ravensberg; 1592–1609	Albert Frederick; Duke of Prussia; 1568–1618	Marie Eleonore (1550 – 1608)	Anna (1552 – 1632)	Philip Louis; C. Palatine/Duke of Neuburg; 1569–1614	Magdalena d.1633	John Casimir of Zweibrucken d.1604 Montferrat; 1631–1637	François II, Duke of Nevers (c. 1540 – 1563); French Prince étranger and general	Jacques, Duke of Nevers (c. 1544 – 1564) rench Prince étranger and general	Henriette of Cleves (1542 – 1601)	Louis de Gonzague, Duke of Nevers (1539 – 2 1595); French Prince étranger,soldier, governor
John Sigismund (1572 - 1619); Margrave & Elector of Brandenburg; 1608–1619; Duke of Prussia,1618–1619	Anna of Prussia (1576 – 1625) awarded prot. Cleves, Mark & Ravensberg 1614–1619 settlement	Magdalene Sibylle of Prussia (1586 –1659) m. John George I, Elector of Saxony	William Wolfgang; Count Palatine & Duke of Neuburg; 1614–1653 awarded Cath. Jülich & Berg, desc.	Augustus, Count Palatine of Sulzbach (1582–1632); Catholic, desc. eventual heirs and inheritors & Counts Palatine and Bavaria	John Casimir; Count Palatine of Zweibrücken d.1652	Charles I Gonzaga (1580 – 1637); Duke of Mantua and Duke of Montferrat from 1627
George William; Margrave & Elector of Brandenburg; Duke of Prussia; 1619–1640	John George II; Elector of Saxony; 1656–1680

== Coat of arms ==
The historic coat of arms of Berg shows a red lion with a double tail and blue crown, tongue, and claws – blazoned as: Argent a lion rampant gules, queue fourchée crossed in saltire, armed, langued, and crowned azure. This lion originates from the arms of the Duke of Limburg as the Berg title in the 13th century fell to the Limburg line.

Heraldic shield of arms

== See also ==
- List of consorts of Berg
- Aachen fine cloth
