= Adolf IV of Berg =

Adolf IV

Count of Berg
- Predecessor: Adolf III
- Successor: Engelbert I
- Died: after 1161
- Spouse: Adelheid von Arnsberg; Irmgard (?) von Schwarzenberg
- Issue: Adolf V of Berg; Engelbert I of Berg; Eberhard IV of Berg; Friedrich II of Berg; Bruno III of Berg; Arnold, Prince-Bishop of Osnabrück
- House: House of Berg
- Father: Adolf III of Berg
- Mother: Adelheid of Cleves

Adolf IV of Berg count of Berg from 1132 until 1160 and of Altena (died after 1161), son of Adolf III of Berg count of Berg and Hövel. He married (1st) Adelheid von Arnsberg, a daughter of Heinrich count von Rietberg; then (2nd) Irmgard (?) von Schwarzenberg, a daughter of Engelbert von Schwarzenberg.

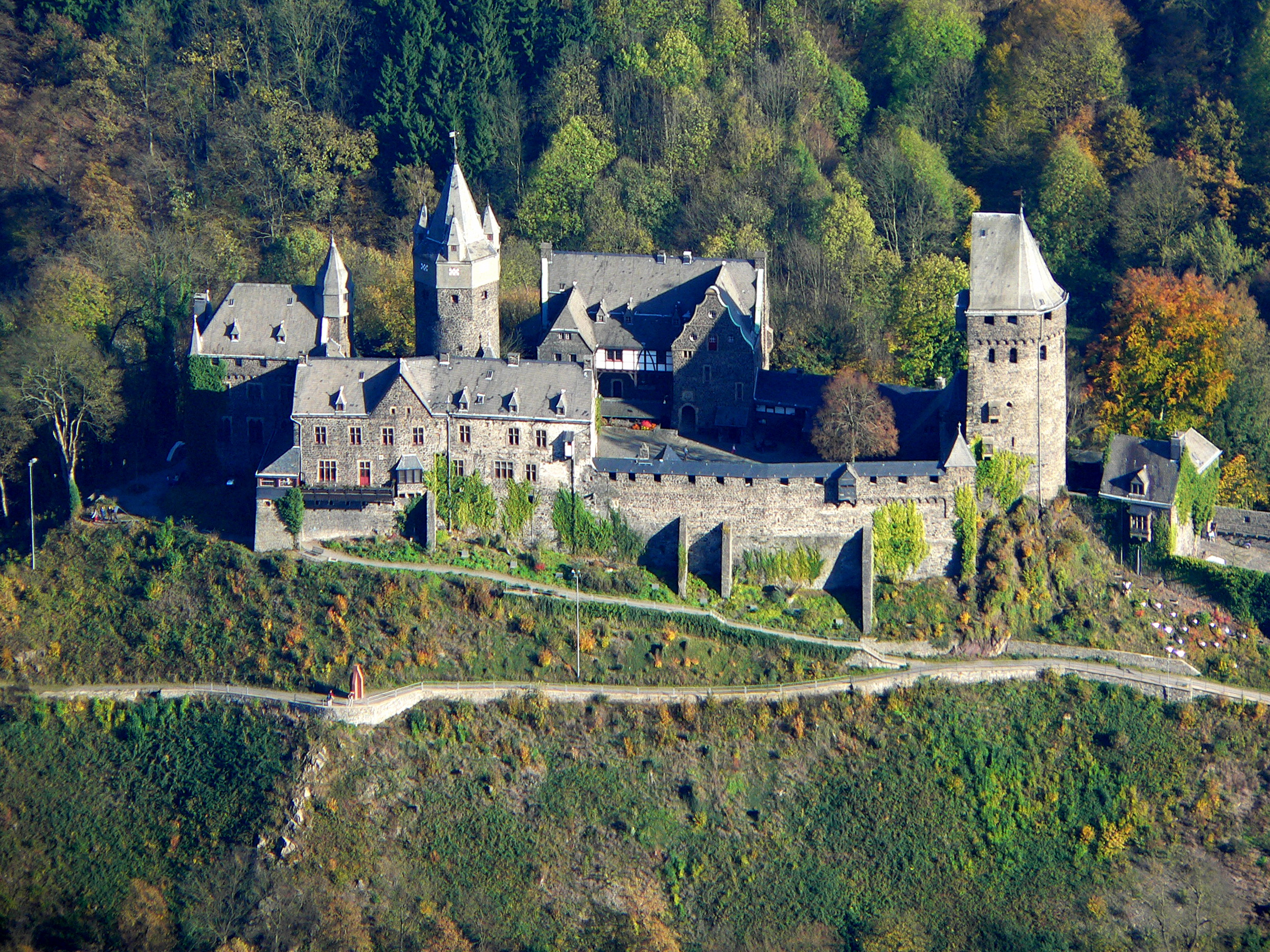
Castle of Altena

He built the Schloss Altena, and built Altenberg Abbey (1133) where he enters in 1160.

He had issue from his first marriage:

- Adolf V of Berg count of Berg (killed in Damascus 1148), who married Irmgard von Wasserburg, a daughter of Engelbert count von Wasserburg;

and from his second marriage:

- Engelbert I of Berg count of Berg from 1160 until 1189 (born before 1150, died in Brandis an der Donau June 1189); married Margaret of Geldern (born 1157, died 1190?);
- Eberhard IV of Berg, 1st count of Altena (also called Eberhard I von Altena) (born 1140, died 23 January 1180, buried in Altenberg);
- Friedrich II of Berg, Archbishop of Cologne from 1156 until 1158 (born 1140, died in Pavia 15 December 1158);
- Bruno III of Berg, Archbishop of Cologne and Duke of Westfalia from 1191 till 1193 (died 1193, buried in Altenberg);
- Arnold, Prince-Bishop of Osnabrück from 1173 until 1190 (died a crusader before Akkon, 15 December 1190).

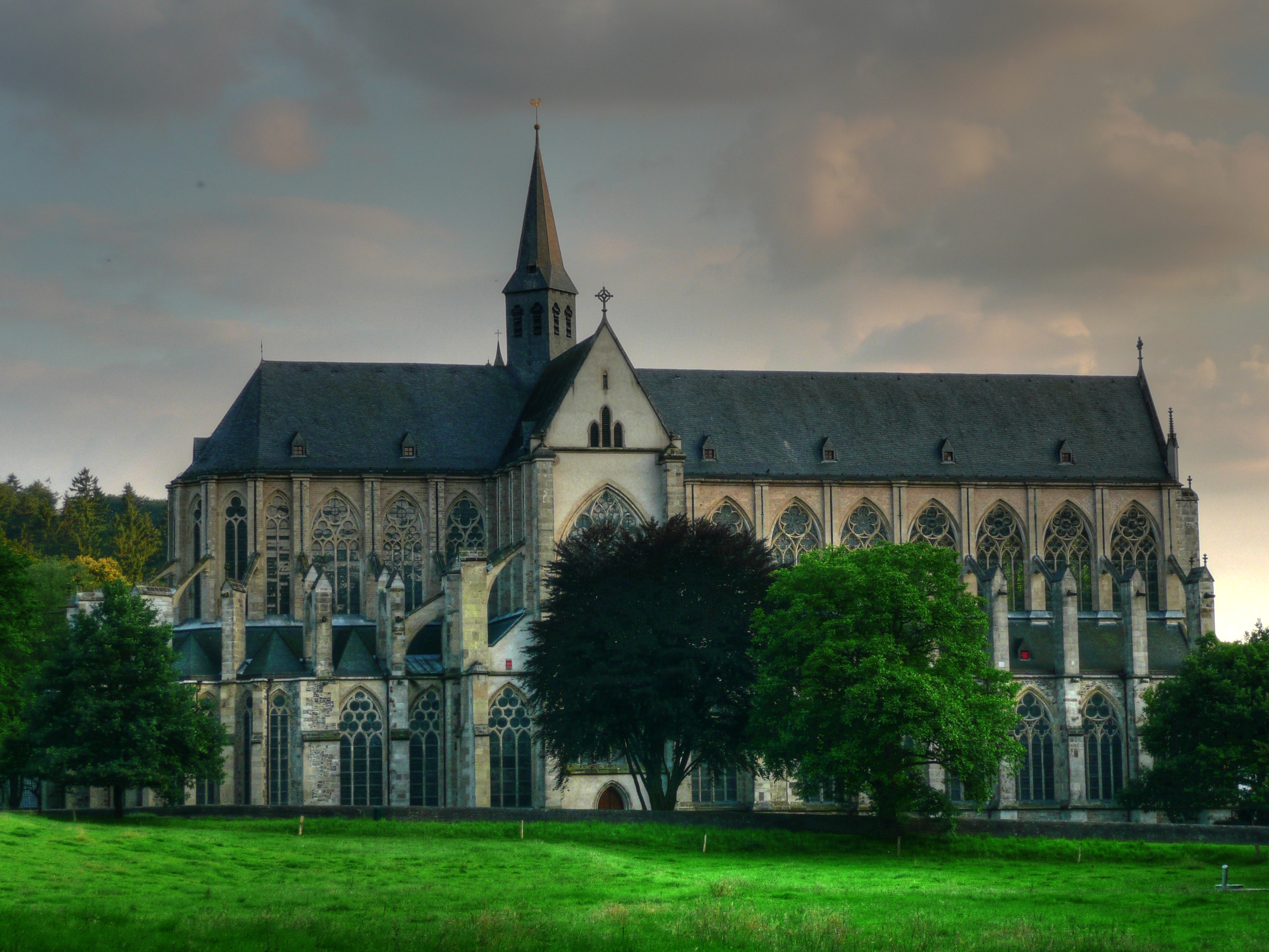
At the beginning of the 12th century Adolf II of Berg donated the site of their old ancestral castle, Schloss Berg, to Cistercian monks from Burgundy. Adolf IV later built the Altenberg Abbey.

== Nota ==
Adolf IV, Count of Berg is named Adolf II, Count of Berg in the Netherlands and in Germany.

== Literature ==
- Alberic of Troisfontaines (MGH, Scriptores XXIII).
- Annales Rodenses (MGH, Scriptores, XVI).
- Annalista Saxo (MGH, Scriptores VI).
- Gesta Trevirorum (MGH, Scriptores VIII).
- MGH, Diplomata.
- REK I-II. – Rheinisches UB.
- Hömberg, “Geschichte.”
- Jackman, “Counts of Cologne.”
- Jackman, Criticism.
- Klebel, E. “Niederösterreich und der Stammbaum der Grafen von Görz und Schwarzburg.” Unsere Heimat. Monatsblatt des Vereins für Landeskunde von Niederösterreich 23 (1952) 111-23.
- Kluger, “Propter claritatem generis.” – Kraus, Entstehung.
- Lück, D. “Der Avelgau, die erste fassbare Gebietseinteilung an der unteren Sieg.” In: Heimatbuch der Stadt Siegburg I. Ed. H. J. Roggendorf. Siegburg, 1964. Pp. 223–85.
- Lück, D. “In pago Tuizichgowe – Anmerkungen zum Deutzgau.” Rechtsrheinisches Köln 3 (1977) 1-9.
- Milz, “Vögte.”
- Schmale, “Anfänge.” – Tyroller, “Genealogie.”
- Wunder, G. “Die Nichten des Erzbischofs Friedrich von Köln.” AHVN 164 (1962) 192-6.
- Wunder, G. “Die Verwandtschaft des Erzbischofs Friedrich I. von Köln. Ein Beitrag zur abendländischen Verflechtung des Hochadels im Mittelalter.” AHVN 166 (1964) 25-54.

== Sources ==
- Gilbert of Mons (2005). Napran, Laura (ed.). Chronicle of Hainaut. Boydell Press.

Preceded by Adolf III	Count of Berg; 1132–1160	Succeeded by Engelbert I
