= Engelbert II of Berg =

German saint and archbishop

Saint Engelbert of Cologne
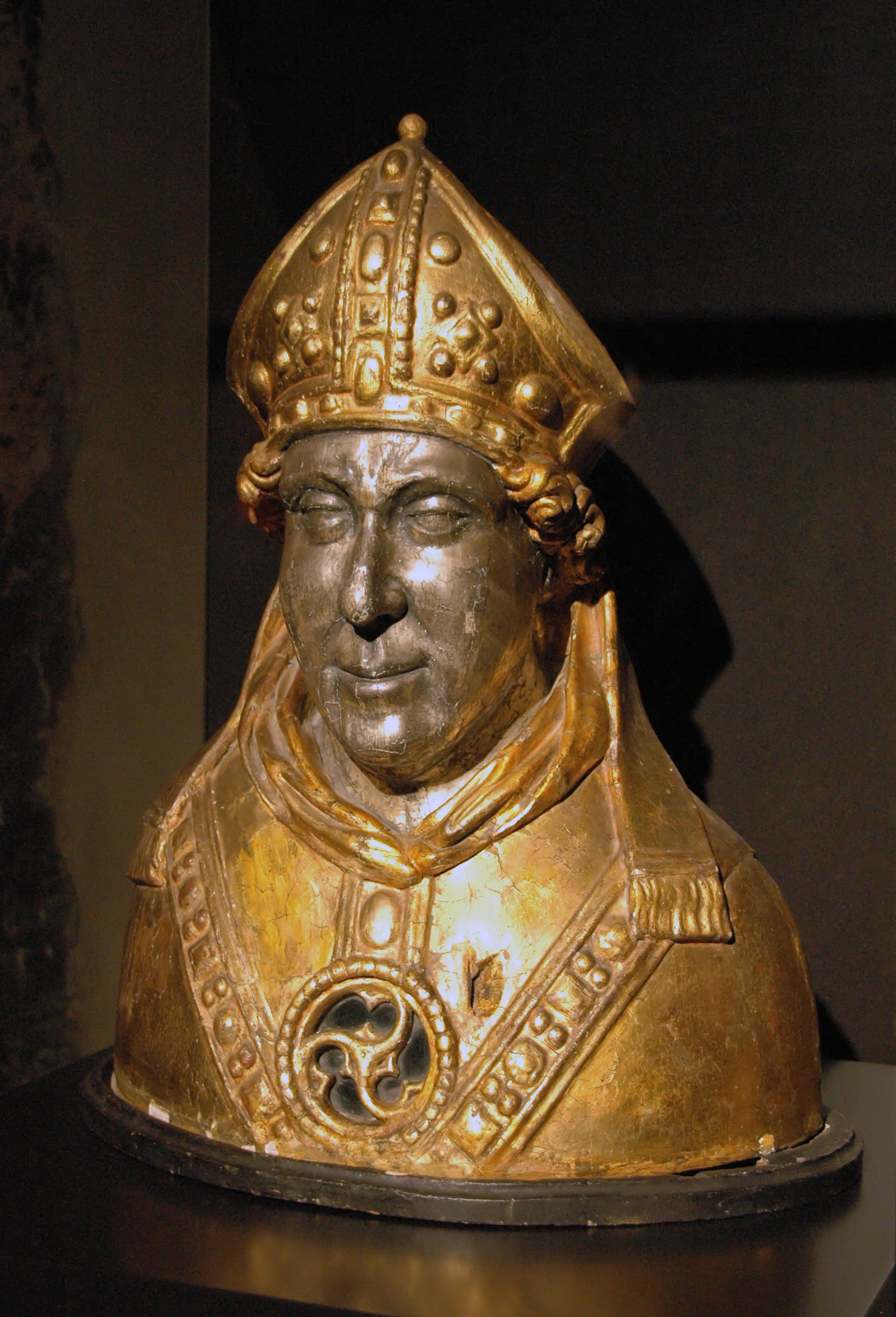

Archbishop of Cologne and Martyr
- Born: 1185 or 1186; Burg an der Wupper, Germany
- Died: 7 November 1225 (aged 40 or 41); Gevelsberg, near Schwelm, Germany
- Venerated in: Catholic Church
- Major shrine: Cologne, Germany
- Feast: 7 November
- Attributes: a crosier in one hand, with an upraised sword, in the other, piercing a crescent moon

Count Engelbert II of Berg, also known as Saint Engelbert, Engelbert of Cologne, Engelbert I, Archbishop of Cologne or Engelbert I of Berg, Archbishop of Cologne (1185 or 1186, Schloss Burg – 7 November 1225, Gevelsberg) was archbishop of Cologne and a saint; (Note: The description "Engelbert I of Berg" can refer either to Count Engelbert I of Berg or to the subject of this article, his son, Count Engelbert II of Berg, if referred to by his ecclesiastical office, when the form "Engelbert I of Berg, Archbishop of Cologne" sometimes occurs besides the more usual "Engelbert I of Cologne".) he was notoriously murdered by a member of his own family.

== Early life ==
Engelbert was born in 1185 or 1186 in Schloss Burg (present Burg an der Wupper), the younger son of Count Engelbert I of Berg and his wife Margarete of Guelders. He was educated at the cathedral school in Cologne. From 1198 (at the age of twelve or thirteen) he held the office of provost of St. George in Cologne, and from 1199 to 1216 he also held the office of cathedral provost at Cologne Cathedral. He further acquired at various times a number of other provostships: in Cologne, Aachen, Deventer and Zutphen. He was elected Bishop of Münster in 1203, but he declined because of his age.

Engelbert was excommunicated by Pope Innocent III in 1206, on account of his support for his cousin Adolf of Altena, archbishop of Cologne, in the interests of Philip of Swabia against Otto of Brunswick but was pardoned in 1208. In 1212, as an act of penance for his earlier rebellion, he took part in the Albigensian Crusade. He gave his allegiance to the future Frederick II, Holy Roman Emperor, after the Battle of Bouvines in 1214.

== Archbishop of Cologne and after ==
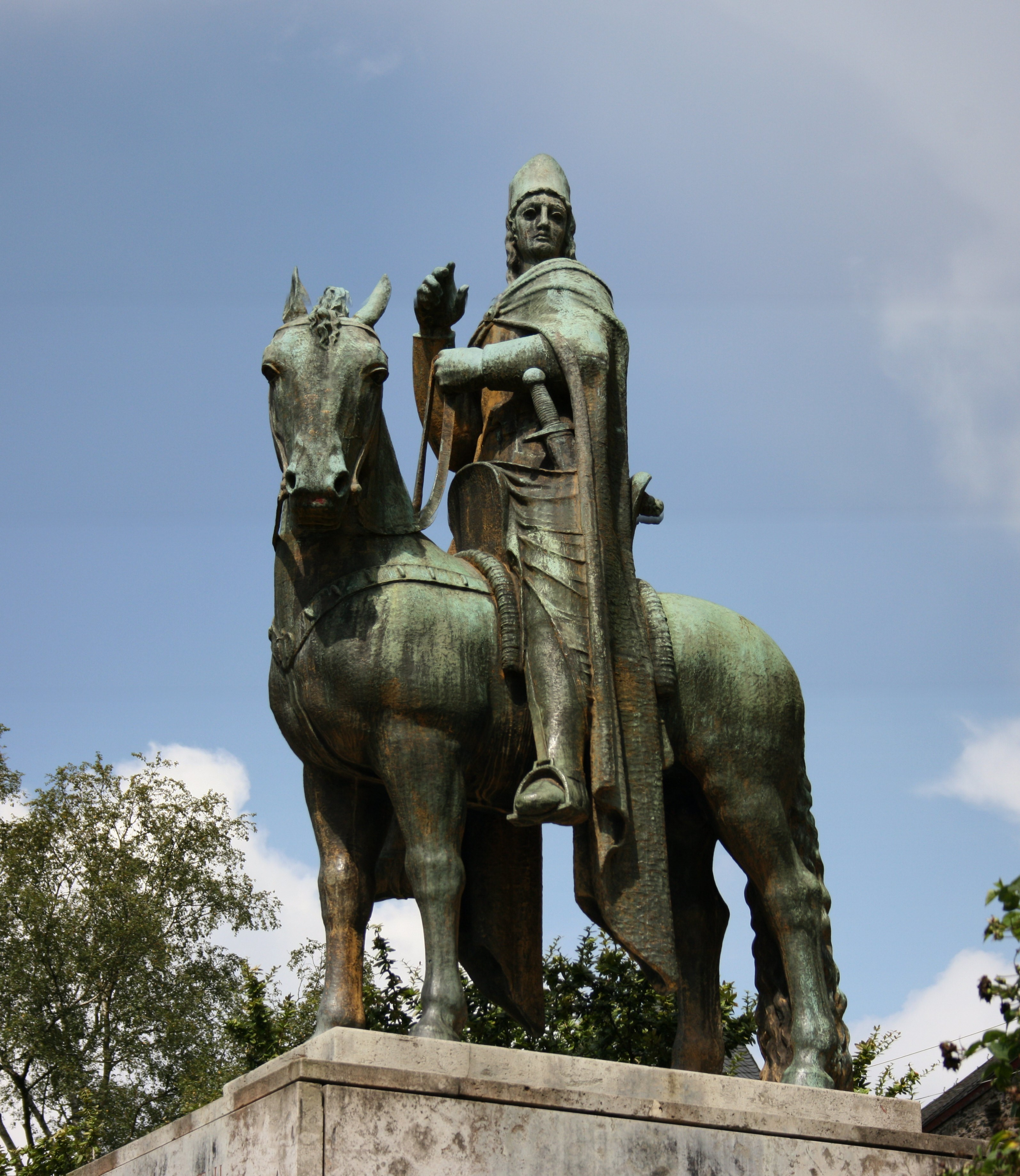
Statue of Archbishop Engelbert at Schloss Burg (sculptor Paul Wynand)

Engelbert was elected Archbishop of Cologne as Engelbert I on 29 February 1216 and was consecrated on 24 September 1217, in which office he remained until his death.

Engelbert came to enjoy the trust of Frederick II, Holy Roman Emperor, becoming imperial regent (Reichsverweser) in 1220 and guardian of the Emperor's son Henry. In 1222, Engelbert crowned twelve-year-old Henry as King of the Romans in Aachen. Engelbert remained Henry's tutor and guardian until his death.

It is not clear to what extent Engelbert was personally involved with the Confoederatio cum principibus ecclesiasticis, a treaty with the ecclesiastical princes, which Frederick signed on 26 April 1220, although as Administrator of the German Kingdom (Gubernator Regni Teutonici) he must have had at least some input. Clearly, however, in the increased powers it gave to all ecclesiastical princes it was of benefit also to the archbishops of Cologne, and the establishment and development of the new powers was part of Engelbert's archepiscopal strategy.

When Engelbert succeeded, the rights and territories of the archdiocese were in bad order, following a long period of civil unrest in Germany. He engaged himself at once in a series of campaigns and strategies to win them back and safeguard them, principally against the Dukes of Limburg and their allies the County of Cleves. Engelbert in turn set up alliances with Brabant and Namur.

Engelbert also defended his personal inheritance as Count of Berg against Duke Waleran III of Limburg. In 1218 Engelbert's elder brother Count Adolf VI of Berg died on the Fifth Crusade without a male heir. Waleran considered himself entitled to inherit the County of Berg because his son Henry was married to Irmgard of Berg, Adolf's only daughter. According to the Salic law, however, Engelbert was the heir. He won the dispute in two feuds. In 1220 a peace was concluded and Waleran's claim settled by the payment of a year's revenues.

Engelbert granted town privileges to many places, including Wipperfürth, Attendorn, Brilon, Siegen, Werl and Herford, Vianden, Hamm, Neuerburg and Manderscheid.

During his incumbency as archbishop, Engelbert continued to fight for the re-establishment and security of the Archdiocese of Cologne both as an ecclesiastical authority and also as a secular territory. (It was said of him that despite his personal piety he was more of a monarch than a churchman). Not only did he constantly battle, by all means necessary, for the secular well-being of the lands of the archdiocese, of which he may be counted the de facto founder as a significant state; he also took energetic measures for the effective regulation of the City of Cologne itself; and he was a zealous champion of the religious throughout his archdiocese.

== Death ==
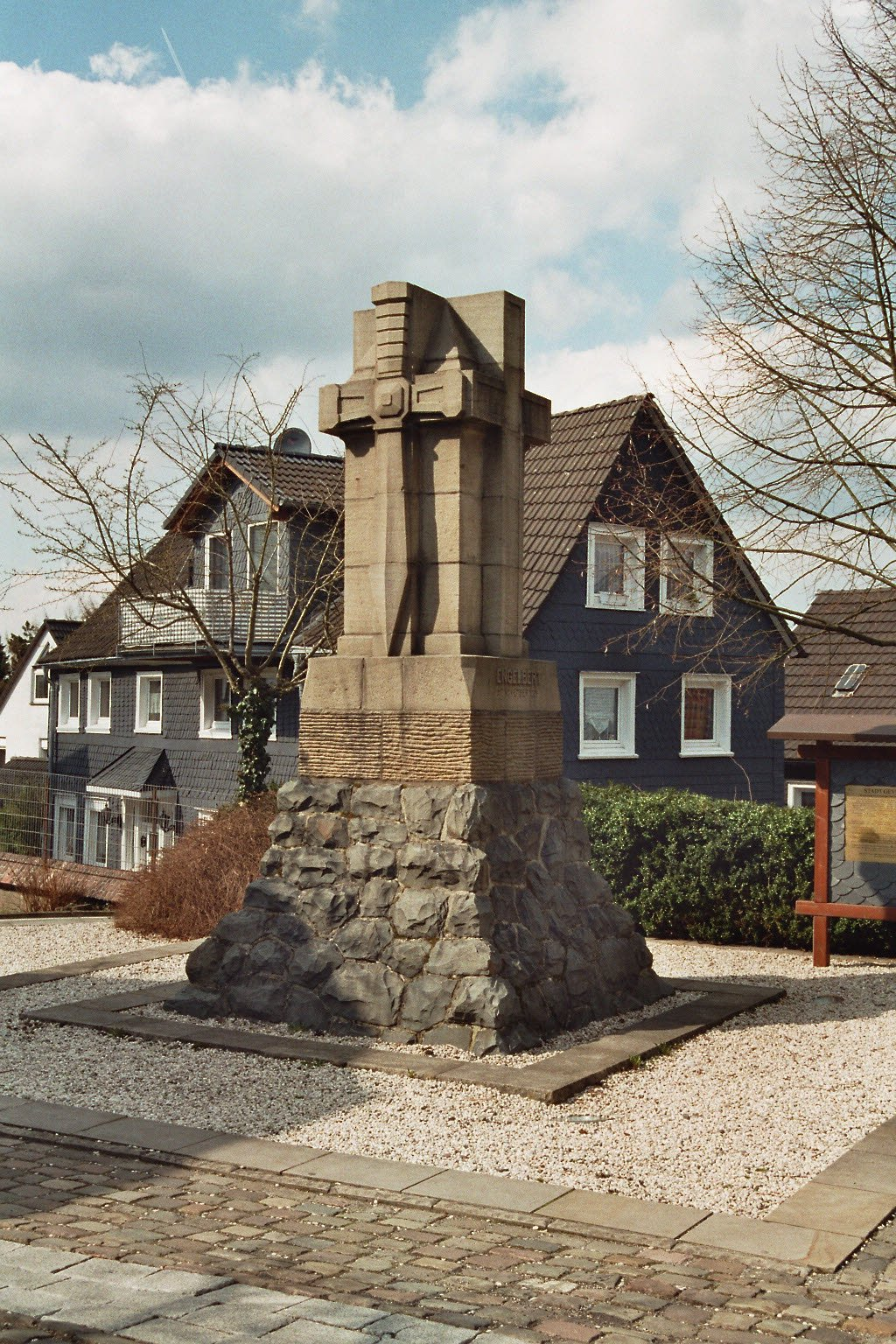
Memorial to the assassinated Archbishop in Gevelsberg

Engelbert earned the respect and affection of his subjects through his devotion to justice and his energy in maintaining law, and took great pains to ensure the well-being of the religious within his authority. However, his effectiveness in achieving his goals by all means necessary, including military action, his allegiance to the pope and the emperor, and his uncompromising defence of the law and the rights of religious persons and bodies, brought him into conflict with the nobility, including his own family, and this led to his death.

His cousin Count Frederick of Isenberg was vogt of Essen Abbey, and abused his position by defrauding the nuns. Engelbert was determined to protect the nuns' interests and sought to bring Frederick to justice. On 7 November 1225 while they travelled together to Cologne from a judicial hearing in Soest, Engelbert was killed, possibly by Frederick, in a defile near present-day Gevelsberg near Schwelm.

It seems probable that a group of disaffected nobility was behind the attack which may have been intended to take Engelbert captive rather than kill him.

Engelbert's body was taken to Cologne on a dung-cart, and when examined, found to have forty-seven wounds.

== Veneration ==
Engelbert's body was buried in Cologne Cathedral on 24 February 1226 by order of Cardinal Conrad of Urach, the papal legate, who declared him a martyr, though a formal canonization did not take place. His remains are preserved today in a Baroque shrine prepared on the authority of Ferdinand of Bavaria, archbishop of Cologne, who in 1618 also ordered the celebration of his feast on 7 November.

== Notes ==
Engelbert of Berg House of Berg Born: 1185 or 1186 in Burg an der Wupper Died: 7 November 1225 in Gevelsberg
Regnal titles
Preceded by Adolf VI von Berg	Count of Berg as Engelbert II; 1218–1225	Succeeded by Henry IV of Limburg
Catholic Church titles
Regnal titles
Preceded by Bruno IV von Sayn and Dietrich I von Hengebach	Archbishop of Cologne and Duke of Westphalia and Angria as Engelbert I 1220–1225	Succeeded by Heinrich I von Müllenark
