= Mariental, Germany =

Mariental
- Municipality
- Coat of arms

- Location of Mariental within Helmstedt district
- Interactive map of Mariental
- Location within Germany Location within Lower Saxony
- Coordinates: 52°17′N 10°59′E
- Country: Germany
- State: Lower Saxony
- District: Helmstedt
- Municipal assoc.: Grasleben
- Subdivisions: 2

Government
  - Mayor: Fred Worch (CDU)

Area
  - Total: 6.53 km^{2} (2.52 sq mi)
- Elevation: 137 m (449 ft)

Population (2025-12-31)
  - Total: 995
  - Density: 152/km^{2} (395/sq mi)
- Time zone: UTC+01:00 (CET)
  - Summer (DST): UTC+02:00 (CEST)
- Postal codes: 38368
- Dialling codes: 05356
- Vehicle registration: HE
- Website: www.samtgemeinde-grasleben.de

Mariental is a municipality in the district of Helmstedt, in Lower Saxony, Germany. The Municipality Mariental includes the villages of Mariental-Dorf and Mariental-Horst. See also Mariental Abbey.

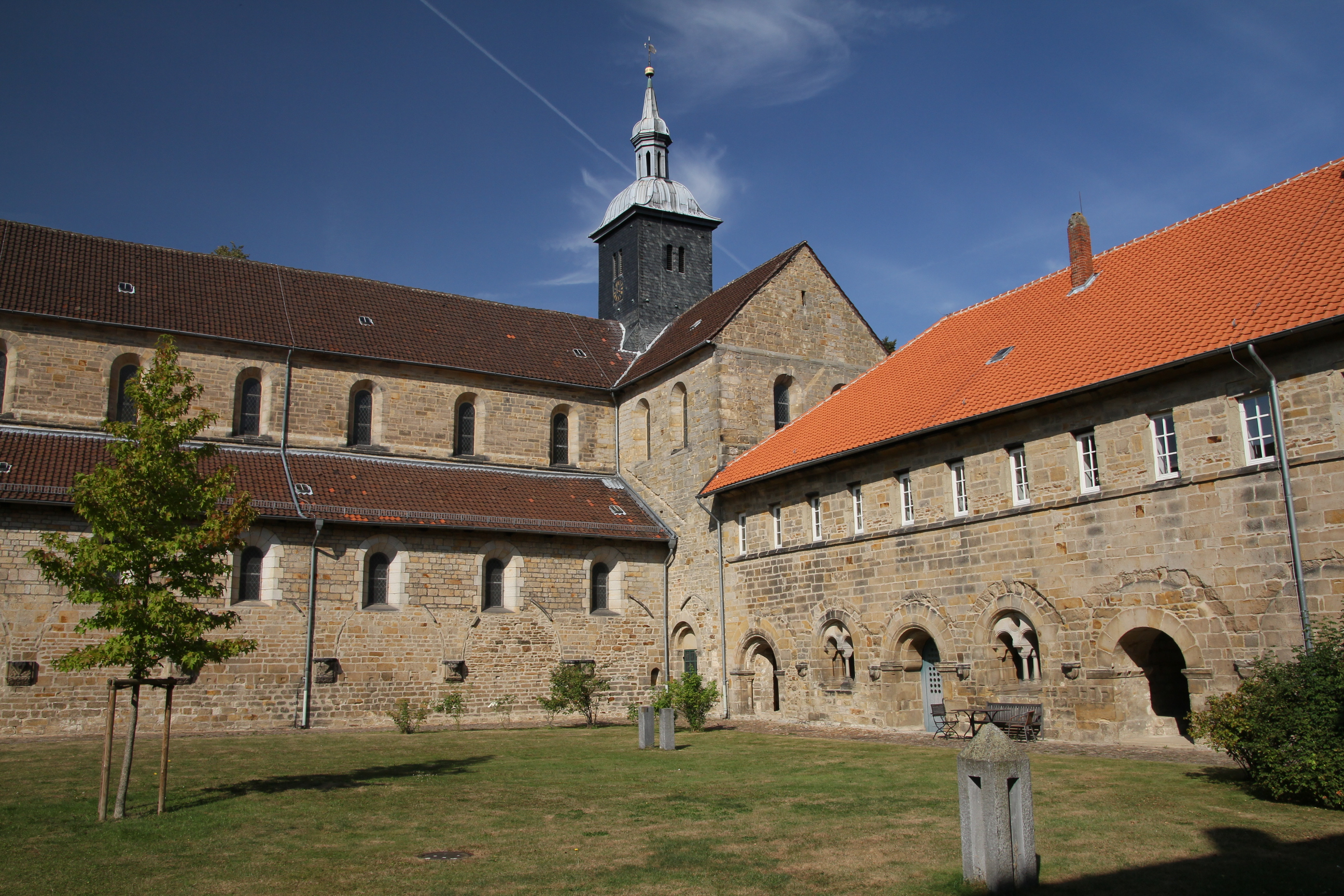
The former abbey Mariental in Mariental-Dorf

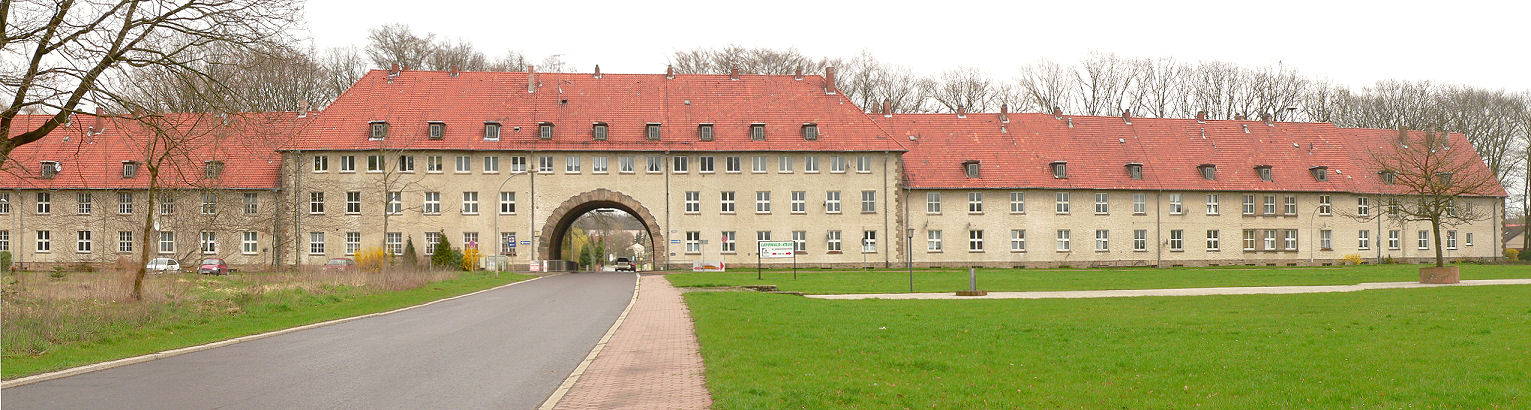
The former military air base in Mariental-Horst
