= Adolf VI of Berg =

Ruler of County of Berg

Adolf VI
- Count of Berg
- Reign: 1197–1218
- Predecessor: Engelbert I
- Successor: Engelbert II, Archbishop of Cologne
- Born: before 1176
- Died: 7 August 1218
- Spouse: Berta von Sayn
- Issue: Irmgard of Berg
- Father: Engelbert I of Berg
- Mother: Margaret of Geldern

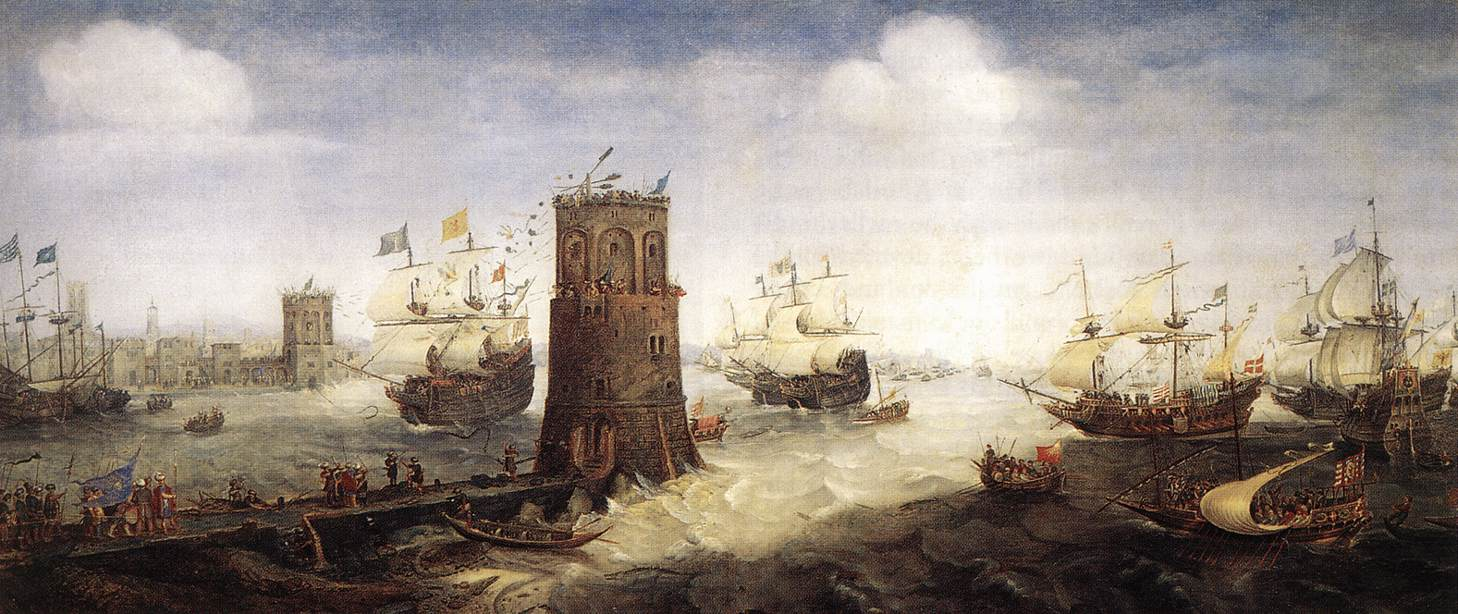
Crusaders confront the Tower of Damietta, Egypt

Count Adolf VI of Berg (born before 1176 – died 7 August 1218 at Damiette during the crusade against Egypt) ruled the County of Berg from 1197 until 1218.

== Life ==
He was the son of Engelbert I of Berg and Margaret of Geldern, and the oldest brother of Engelbert II of Berg (1185–1225), also known as Engelbert of Cologne or Saint Engelbert. Adolf married Berta von Sayn (died 1244), a daughter of Henry II von Sayn and Agnes zu Saffenberg. They had one daughter:

- Irmgard of Berg, heiress of Berg (died 1248–9). She married Henry IV, Duke of Limburg.

In 1212 Adolf took part to the Albigensian Crusade against the Cathars. And in 1215 he took over the Kaiserpfalz Kaiserswerth.

Adolf left on 1218 with the Fifth Crusade to Egypt and died on 7 August 1218 of a plague as commander of the Lower-Rhenish and Frisian troops in Damiette, in the delta of the Nile.

His brother, the Archbishop Engelbert II of Berg followed him as ruler of Berg, which later went to the husband of Adolf's daughter, Irmgard of Berg.

== Nota ==
Adolf VI, Count of Berg is named Adolf III, Count of Berg in the Netherlands and in Germany

== Literature ==
Alberic of Troisfontaines (MGH, Scriptores XXIII). - Annales Rodenses (MGH, Scriptores, XVI). - Annalista Saxo (MGH, Scriptores VI). – Gesta Trevirorum (MGH, Scriptores VIII). – MGH, Diplomata. – REK I-II. – Rheinisches UB. – Hömberg, "Geschichte". – Jackman, "Counts of Cologne". – Jackman, Criticism. – Klebel, E. "Niederösterreich und der Stammbaum der Grafen von Görz und Schwarzburg". Unsere Heimat. Monatsblatt des Vereins für Landeskunde von Niederösterreich 23 (1952) 111–23. – Kluger, "Propter claritatem generis". – Kraus, Entstehung. – Lück, D. "Der Avelgau, die erste fassbare Gebietseinteilung an der unteren Sieg". In: Heimatbuch der Stadt Siegburg I. Ed. H. J. Roggendorf. Siegburg, 1964. pp. 223–85. – Lück, D. "In pago Tuizichgowe – Anmerkungen zum Deutzgau". Rechtsrheinisches Köln 3 (1977) 1–9. – Milz, "Vögte". – Schmale, "Anfänge". – Tyroller, "Genealogie". – Wunder, G. "Die Nichten des Erzbischofs Friedrich von Köln". AHVN 164 (1962) 192–6. – Wunder, G. "Die Verwandtschaft des Erzbischofs Friedrich I. von Köln. Ein Beitrag zur abendländischen Verflechtung des Hochadels im Mittelalter". AHVN 166 (1964) 25–54.

| Preceded by Engelbert I | Count of Berg; 1189–1218 | Succeeded by Engelbert II, Archbishop of Cologne |
