= Grasleben =

- Municipality
- Coat of arms

- Location of Grasleben within Helmstedt district
- Interactive map of Grasleben
- Location within Germany Location within Lower Saxony
- Coordinates: 52°19′N 11°1′E
- Country: Germany
- State: Lower Saxony
- District: Helmstedt
- Municipal assoc.: Grasleben

Government
  - Mayor: Veronika Koch (CDU)

Area
  - Total: 11.27 km^{2} (4.35 sq mi)
- Elevation: 99 m (325 ft)

Population (2025-12-31)
  - Total: 2,256
  - Density: 200.2/km^{2} (518.5/sq mi)
- Time zone: UTC+01:00 (CET)
  - Summer (DST): UTC+02:00 (CEST)
- Postal codes: 38368
- Dialling codes: 05357
- Vehicle registration: HE
- Website: www.samtgemeinde-grasleben.de

Grasleben is a municipality in the district of Helmstedt, in Lower Saxony, Germany. It is situated approximately 10 km north of Helmstedt, and 20 km southeast of Wolfsburg. The Municipality Grasleben includes the villages of Grasleben and Heidwinkel.

Grasleben is also the seat of the Samtgemeinde ("collective municipality") Grasleben.

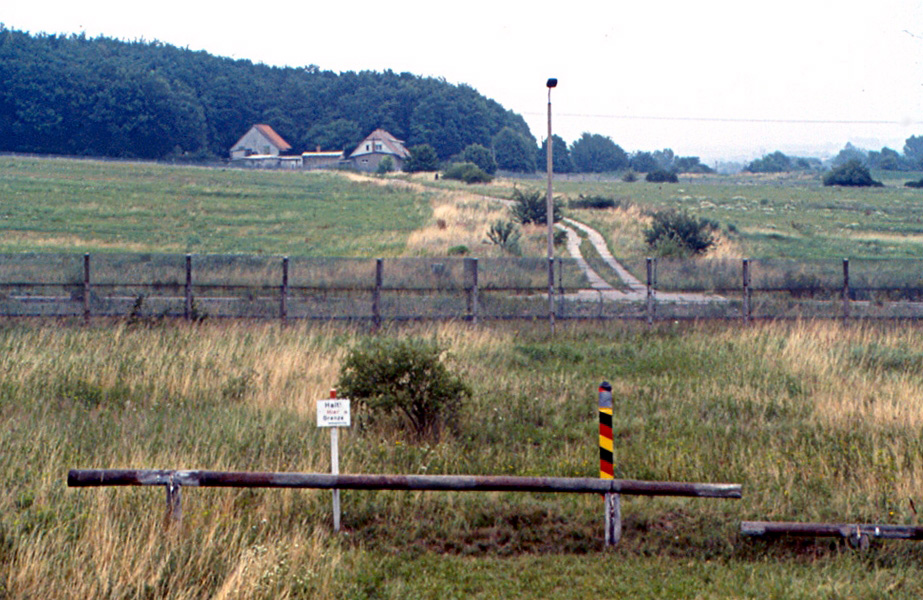
Inner German border at Grasleben, 1989

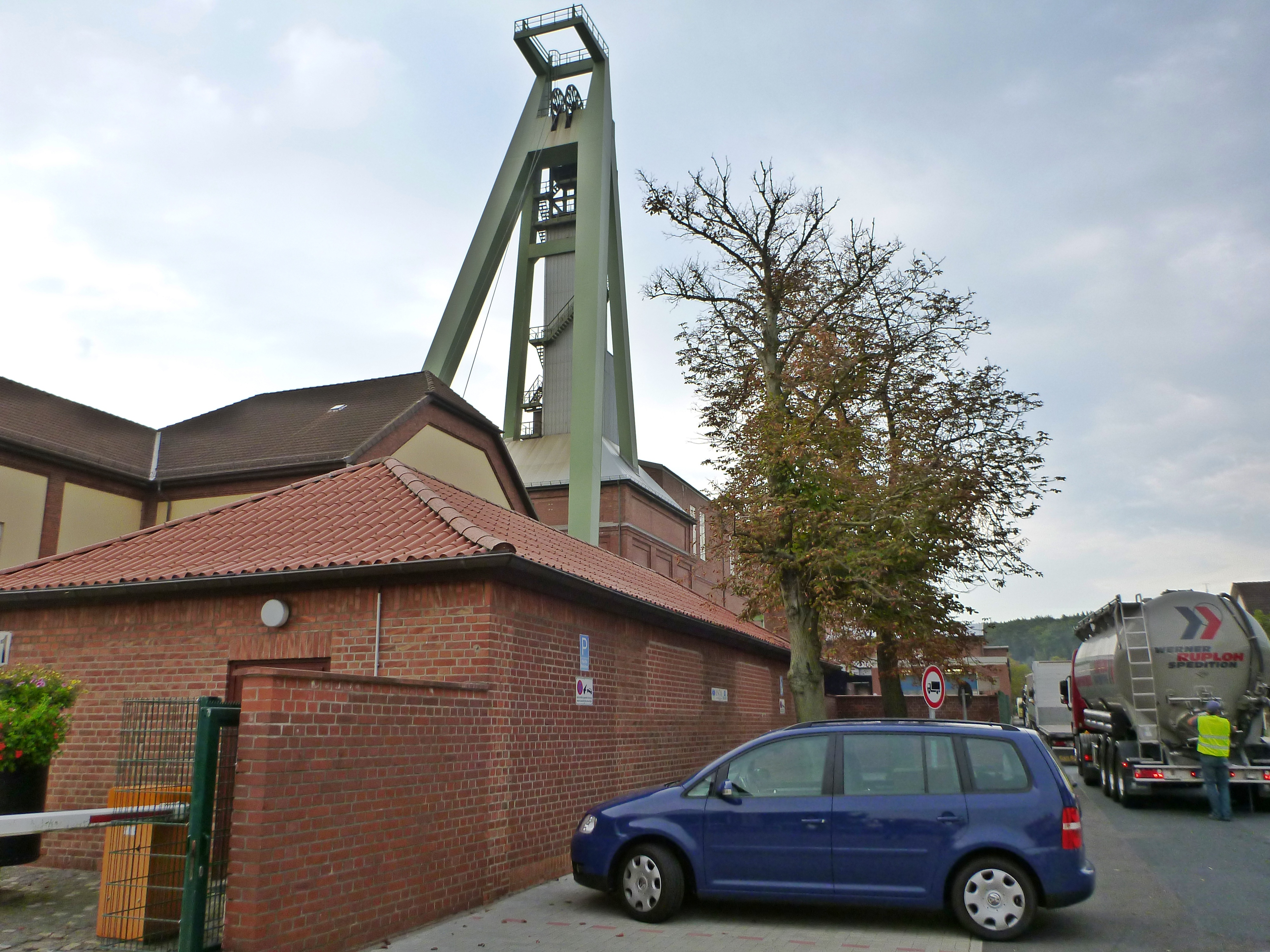
Salt mining

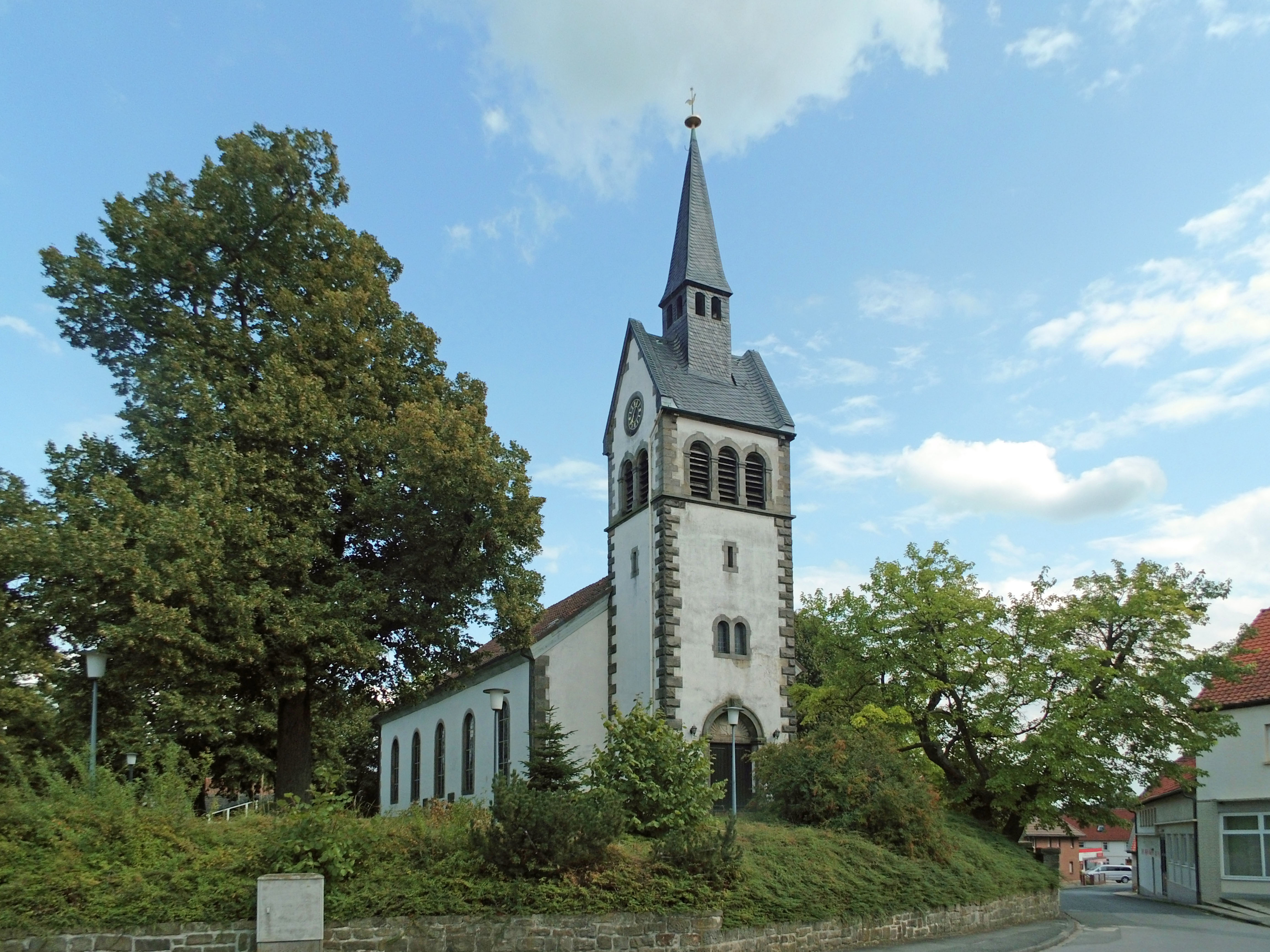
The Lutheran church

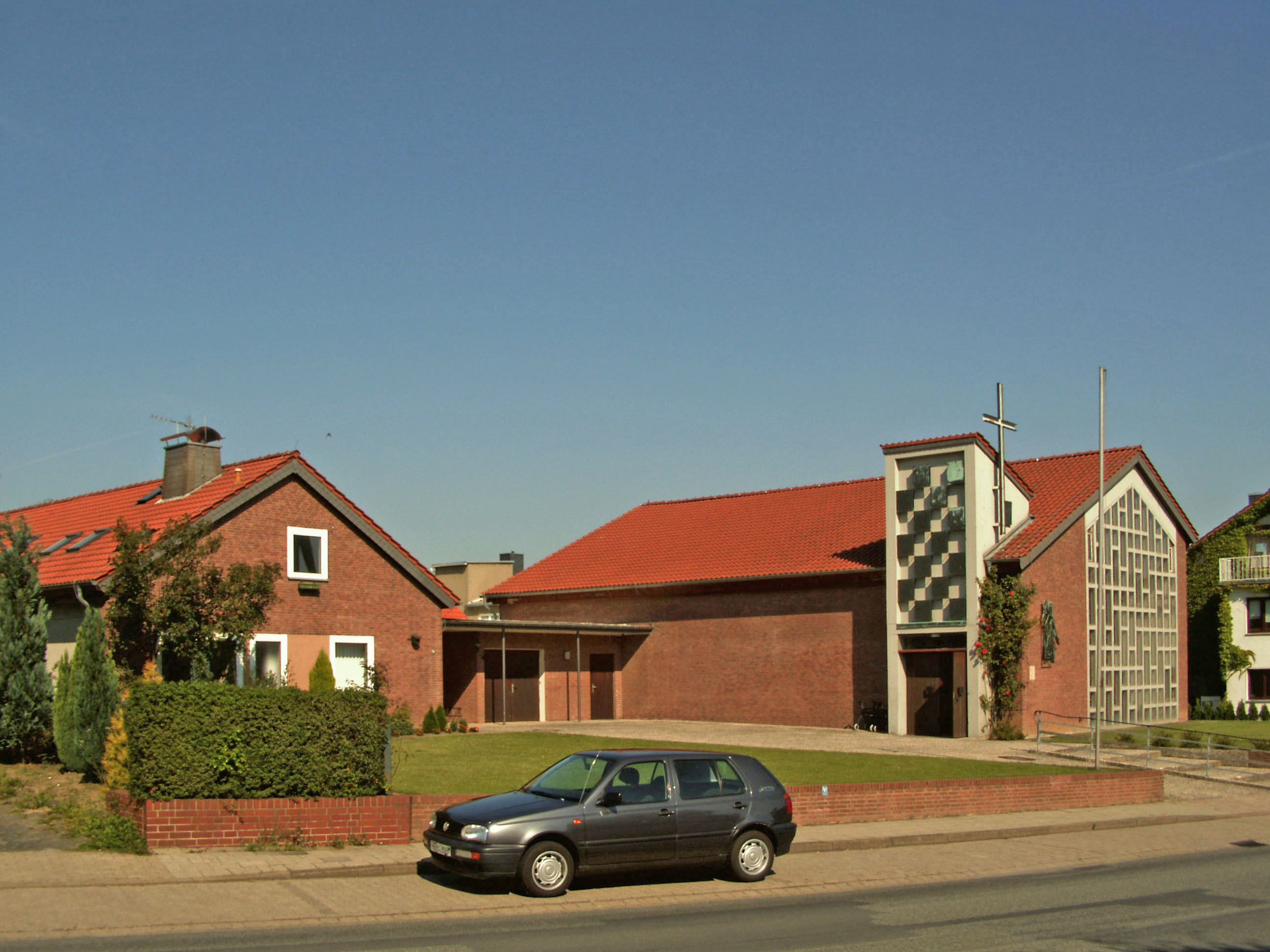
The catholic church
