= Irmgard of Berg =

Duchess of Limburg

Irmgard of Berg, heiress of Berg (died 1248–1249), was the child of Adolf VI count of Berg (1185–1218) and Berta von Sayn.

She married in 1217 Henry IV, Duke of Limburg (since 1226), who became count of Berg in 1225. They had two sons. Adolf took his mother's claim in Berg; Waleran succeeded his father in Limburg.

Henry IV of Limburg-Berg died on 25 Feb 1246; their descendants were counts of Berg, a cadet branch of the Ezzonen.
