= Bruno III von Berg =

German archbishop and nobleman

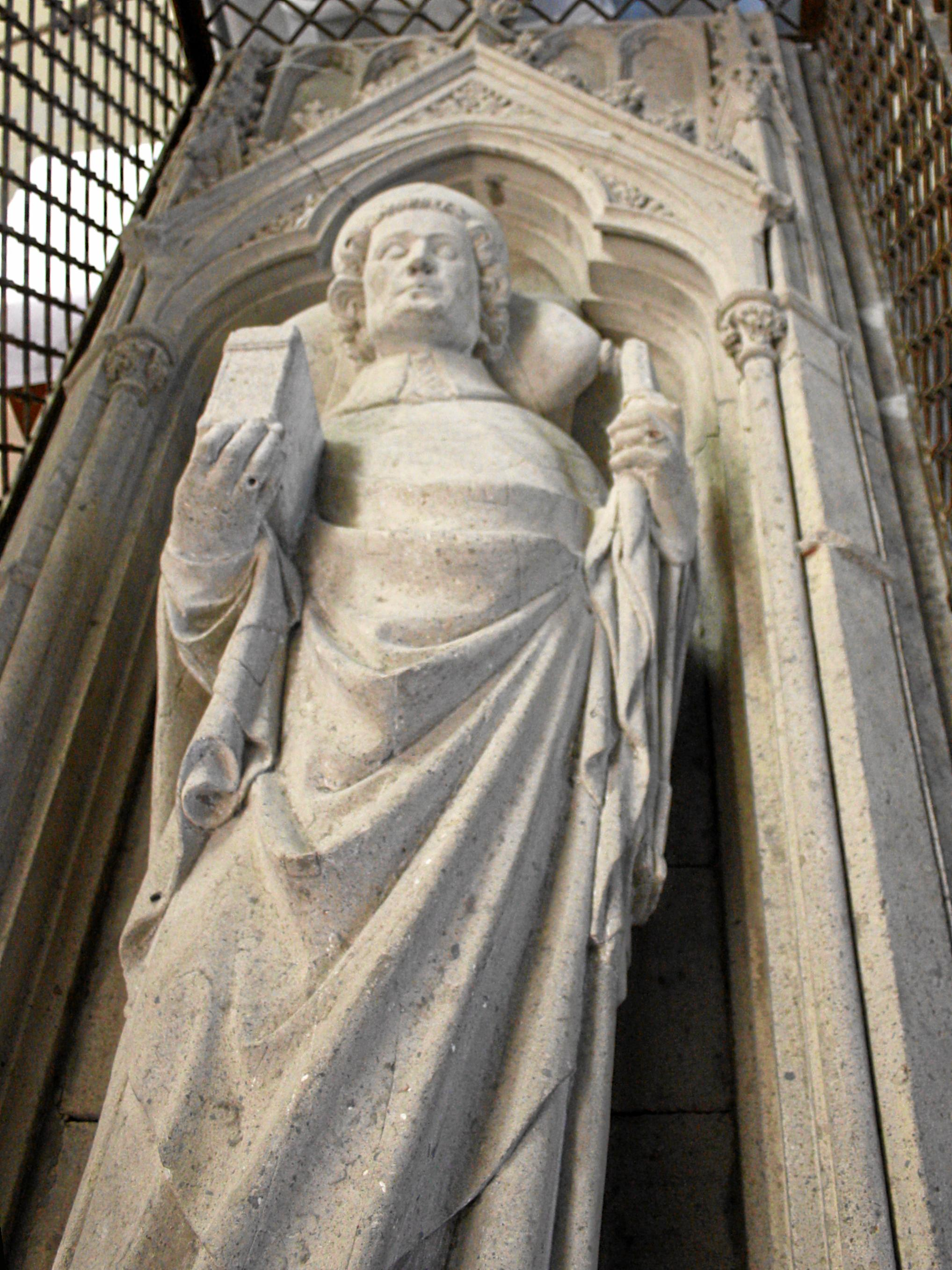
Grave of Bruno III of Berg, Archbishop from Cologne, in Altenberg

Bruno III of Berg (German: Bruno III von Berg) was Archbishop of Cologne and Duke of Westphalia from 1191 until 1193.

The fifth son of Adolf IV, Count of Berg, he is first mentioned in 1156 as provost of St. George in Cologne, and in 1168 as provost at Cologne Cathedral. Named in 1191 Archbishop of Cologne, he resigned in 1193, and finished his life as a monk in Altenberg. He died in 1193, and is buried in Altenberg.

Bruno of Berg House of Berg Born: ca. 1155 Died: ca. 1200
Catholic Church titles
Regnal titles
Preceded by Philip I	Archbishop of Cologne and Duke of Westphalia and Angria; 1191–1193	Succeeded by Adolf I

== Literature ==
- Lewald, Ursula, 'Die Ezzonen. Das Schicksal eines rheinischen Fürstengeschlechts', in Rheinische Vierteljahrsblätter 43 (1979) pp. 120–168
