= List of ancient Athenian politicians =

- Aeschines
- Agyrrhius
- Alcibiades
- Andocides
- Archinus
- Aristides
- Aristogeiton
- Aristophon
- Autocles
- Callistratus
- Charmides
- Chremonides
- Cimon
- Cleisthenes
- Cleophon
- Cleon
- Critias
- Demades
- Demetrius of Phalerum
- Demochares
- Democles
- Demosthenes
- Draco
- Echedemos
- Ephialtes
- Eratosthenes
- Eubulus
- Hagnon
- Hyperbolus
- Hypereides
- Laches
- Lycurgus
- Lysicles
- Miltiades
- Moerocles
- Nicias
- Pericles
- Philinus
- Phocion
- Pisistratus
- Solon
- Themistocles
- Theramenes
- Thrasybulus
- Thucydides
- Timoleon
- Timotheus
- Xanthippus
