= Gullibility =

Failure of social intelligence

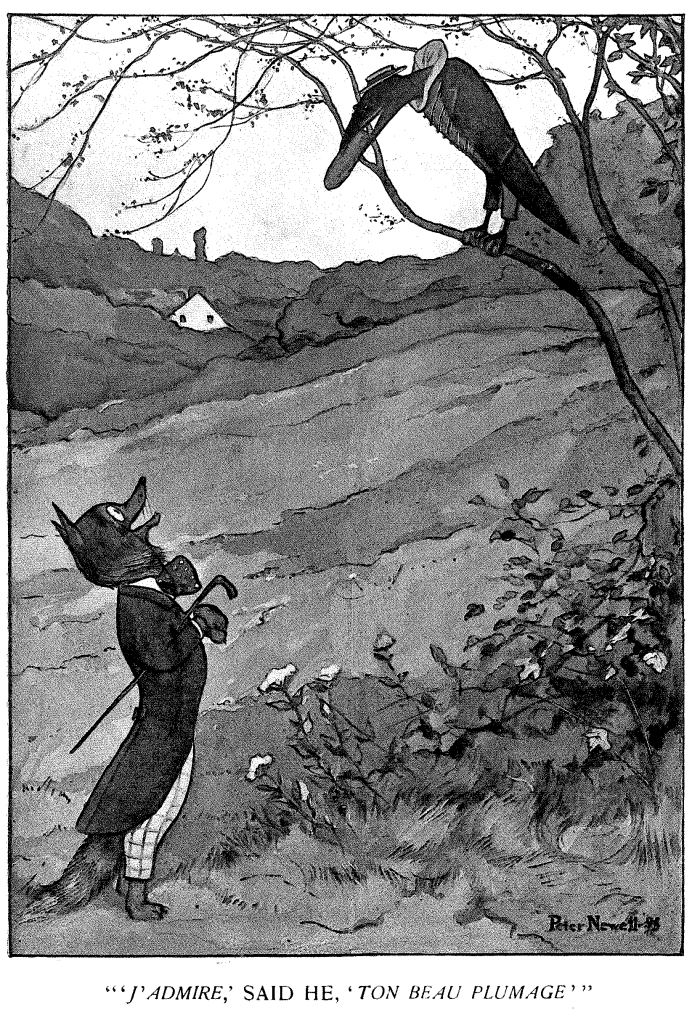
Illustration by Peter Newell for the poem "The Sycophantic Fox and the Gullible Raven" (Fables for the Frivolous) by Guy Wetmore Carryl.

Gullibility is a failure of social intelligence in which a person is easily tricked or manipulated into an ill-advised course of action. It is closely related to credulity, which is the tendency to believe unlikely propositions that are unsupported by evidence.

Classes of people especially vulnerable to exploitation due to gullibility include children, the elderly, and the developmentally disabled.

== Meaning ==
The words gullible and credulous are commonly used as synonyms. Goepp & Kay (1984) state that while both words mean "unduly trusting or confiding", gullibility stresses being duped or made a fool of, suggesting a lack of intelligence, whereas credulity stresses uncritically forming beliefs, suggesting a lack of skepticism. Jewell (2006) states the difference is a matter of degree: the gullible are "the easiest to deceive", while the credulous are "a little too quick to believe something, but they usually aren't stupid enough to act on it."

Yamagishi, Kikuchi & Kosugi (1999) characterize a gullible person as one who is both credulous and naïve. Greenspan (2009) stresses the distinction that gullibility involves an action in addition to a belief, and there is a cause-effect relationship between the two states: "gullible outcomes typically come about through the exploitation of a victim's credulity."

== Etymology and history ==
The verb to gull and the noun cullibility (with a C) date back to Shakespeare and Swift, whereas gullibility is a relatively recent addition to the lexicon. It was considered a neologism as recently as the early 19th century. The first attestation of gullibility known to the Oxford English Dictionary appears in 1793, and gullible in 1825. The OED gives gullible as a back-formation from gullibility, which is itself an alteration of cullibility.

Early editions of Samuel Johnson's A Dictionary of the English Language, including those published in 1797 and 1804, do not contain "gullibility" or "gullible". An 1818 edition by Henry John Todd denounces "gullibility" as "a low expression, sometimes used for cullibility". Gullibility does not appear in Noah Webster's 1817 A dictionary of the English language, but it does appear in the 1830 edition of his American dictionary of the English language, where it is defined: "n. Credulity. (A low word)". Both gullibility and gullible appear in the 1900 New English Dictionary.

== Examples ==
Greenspan (2009) presents dozens of examples of gullibility in literature and history:

- In the fairy tale The Adventures of Pinocchio, the title character is a gullible puppet who is repeatedly duped by other characters; part of his transformation into a human being is learning to avoid gullibility while still exercising empathy.
- In the first part of "Little Red Riding Hood", the title character is deceived by a wolf; from this experience she learns to feign gullibility in order to deceive a second wolf.
- In "The Emperor's New Clothes", the emperor and his staff display gullibility in being swindled, while the crowd displays credulity in believing in the invisible cloth.
- Mark Twain depicts mass gullibility in The Adventures of Tom Sawyer and The Gilded Age: A Tale of Today, among others.
- Shakespeare explores gullibility in the title characters of Romeo and Juliet, Macbeth, and especially Othello.
- Of the examples of deception found in the Bible, the tale that most concerns the behavior of the deceived is Samson in the Book of Judges, a character who is destroyed by his gullibility in the face of love. The best-known example is Eve's gullibility in the Book of Genesis.

Deception is a classic theme in war and politics—see The Art of War and The Prince—and Greenspan finds the example most concerned with the gullibility of the deceived to be the Trojan Horse. In the Aeneid's version of the story, the Trojans are initially wary, but vanity and wishful thinking eventually lead them to accept the gift, resulting in their slaughter. Greenspan argues that a related process of self-deception and groupthink factored into the planning of the Vietnam War and the Second Iraq War. In science and academia, gullibility has been exposed in the Sokal Hoax and in the acceptance of early claims of cold fusion by the media. In society, tulipmania and other investment bubbles involve gullibility driven by greed, while the spread of rumors involves a gullible eagerness to believe (and retell) the worst of other people. April Fools' Day is a tradition in which people trick each other for amusement; it works in part because the deceiver has a social license to betray the trust they have built up over the rest of the year.

== Theories ==
Some writers on gullibility have focused on the relationship between the negative trait of gullibility and positive trait of trust. They are related, as gullibility requires an act of trust. Greenspan (2009) writes that exploiters of the gullible "are people who understand the reluctance of others to appear untrusting and are willing to take advantage of that reluctance." In 1980, Julian Rotter wrote that the two are not equivalent: rather, gullibility is a foolish application of trust despite warning signs that another is untrustworthy.

=== Against gullibility ===
The relationship between gullibility and trust has led to alternate theories. Neuroscientist Hugo Mercier claims the opposite, that humans are intrinsically skeptical and difficult to persuade; we readily accept unsupported or false statements when they support our beliefs. One reason why we form these beliefs is that scientific theories are often counterintuitive, so we discard them in favour of explanations we find logical. This theory struggles to account for the prevalence of conspiracy theories; Mercier explains these as "reflective beliefs" that are insulated from our "intuitive beliefs", meaning that while we hold them we do not base our actions on them; an example of this is in the Pizzagate conspiracy where, despite many people falsely believing that a restaurant was harbouring child sex slaves, few took proportionate actions. As such, humans are not gullible per se, as we do not tend to trust everyone; indeed, a separate study found that more trusting participants were the best at discerning who to trust. As a result, he claims that humans "make more errors of omission (not trusting when we should) than of commission (trusting when we shouldn’t)". Research into how fake news influenced voting preferences in the 2018 Italian General Election supports this, suggesting that we tend to consume fake news that supports our ideologies and, thus, it does little to influence election outcomes.

== See also ==
- Drinking the Kool-Aid
- Gaslighting
- Sheeple
- Suggestibility
- Swampland in Florida
- There's a sucker born every minute
- Manipulation (psychology)
