= Theoris of Lemnos =

4th-century BC Greek woman

Theoris of Lemnos (Ancient Greek: Θεωρίς; died before 323 BC) was an ancient Greek woman from Lemnos who lived in Athens in the fourth century BC, and worked as a witch or folk-healer. At some point before 323, she was tried and executed along with her children. The precise details of Theoris' offence are unclear: modern scholars have variously suggested that she was convicted of intentional homicide, planning to commit homicide, or asebeia (impiety). Three ancient accounts survive of her prosecution, which constitute the most detailed account of a witch trial to survive from Classical Greece.

== Accounts ==
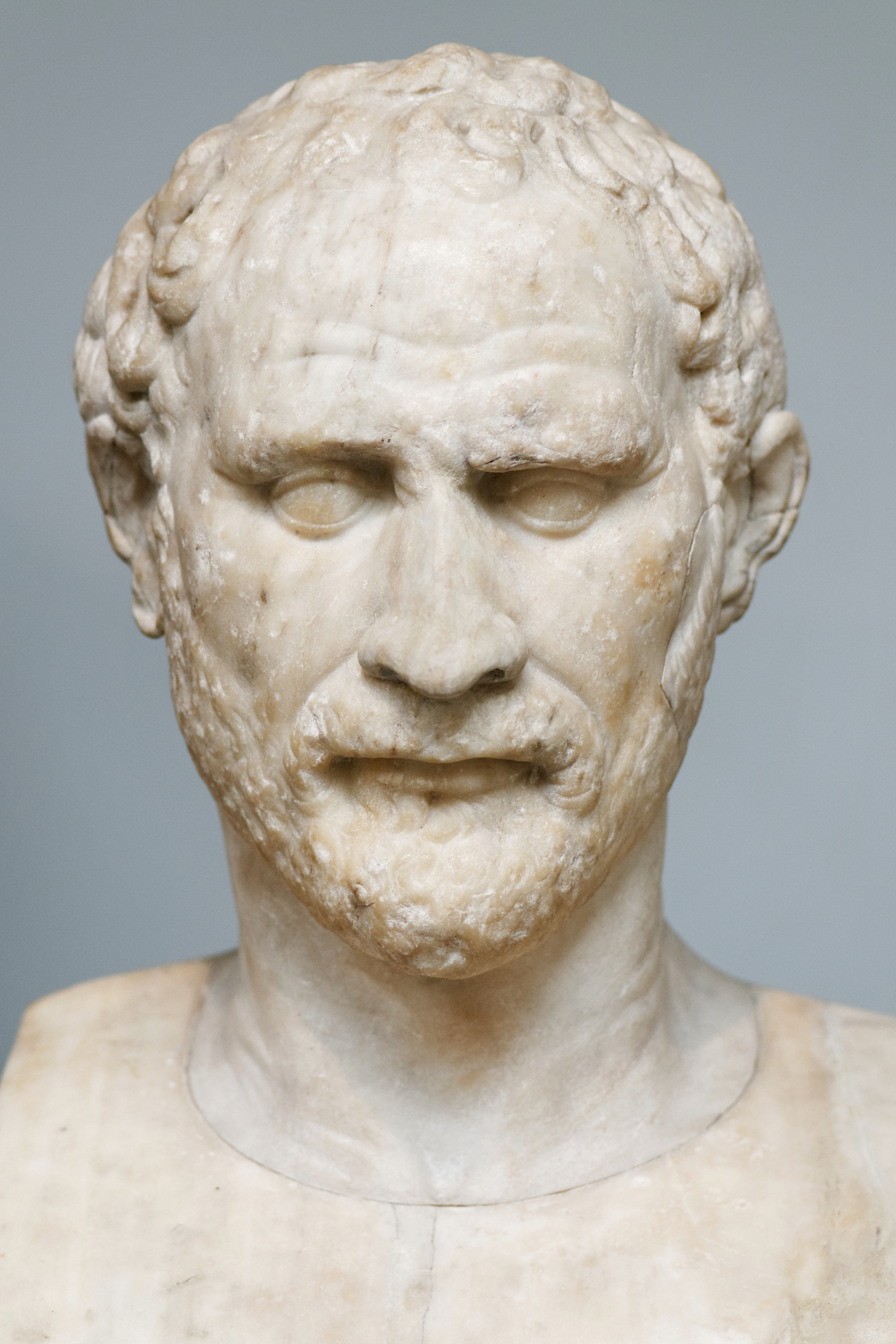
Demosthenes, whose speech Against Aristogeiton is the source of the most detailed account of the prosecution of Theoris

The trial of Theoris of Lemnos is the best-known of several classical Athenian trials of women who practiced magic; it is also the best-attested, appearing in three ancient sources. The earliest and most detailed source is Demosthenes' (Note: Derek Collins says the speech is "generally regarded as spurious" and refers to it throughout as pseudo-Demosthenic. However, Esther Eidinow accepts the speech as Demosthenic, a view supported by Douglas MacDowell in his commentary on the speeches of Demosthenes.) speech Against Aristogeiton, which was addressed to jurors in the trial of Aristogeiton, an Athenian orator. The speech mentions Theoris because of her connection to Eunomus, the brother of Aristogeiton. The speaker attempts to persuade the jury that Eunomus' testimony should be ignored, in part because of his own questionable past, and his involvement in the affair which, according to the speaker, caused Theoris to be convicted and executed.

It was this man [Eunomus, brother of Aristogeiton] who took the potions and incantations from the maidservant of Theoris of Lemnos, the filthy sorceress whom you executed for these things, both her and all her family. The maidservant informed against her mistress, and this evildoer has had children by her, and with her help performs his tricks and acts of deceit, and says he treats those who are seized by fits, when he himself is caught in acts of wickedness of every kind.

The brief account of Theoris' trial given in Demosthenes' speech seems to assume that the jury will have been familiar with the trial, suggesting that Theoris' case was well-known. Two later versions of the story of Theoris also survive, both based on the one in Against Aristogeiton. One is by the Hellenistic atthidographer Philochorus, cited by Harpocration in the second century AD; the other is from Plutarch's biography of Demosthenes, which also dates to the second century AD. Plutarch's account of the case seems to conflate the story of Theoris with that of another woman mentioned in the speeches of Demosthenes, Ninos, who was executed in the 350s or 340s BC – apparently for performing rites which mocked the Dionysian mysteries.

== Life ==
Theoris was originally from the island of Lemnos, but lived in Athens. Lemnos had been controlled by Athens since 390 BC, and so Theoris may have been an Athenian citizen; alternatively she may have been one of the "dispossessed" Lemnians who were not from Athenian settlements on the island. (Note: Scholars are divided on which is more likely: Derek Collins says that she is more likely a metic; Matthew Dickie describes her as "apparently an Athenian citizen".) Theoris had children, but there is no mention of a husband in the ancient sources. Her children may have been fathered by Eunomus, the brother of Aristogeiton, though Demosthenes' text is not clear on this. Her household also included the maidservant who, according to Demosthenes, denounced Theoris, which suggests that she had some level of wealth.

Theoris was apparently some kind of magic user. Demosthenes describes her as a pharmakis, literally a provider of drugs and potions, but in this context meaning a witch or sorceress, and Philochorus calls her a mantis or 'seer'. These two descriptions are not necessarily incompatible: though the terms pharmakis and mantis both have specific meanings, magic users in ancient Greece did not necessarily restrict themselves to one type of supernatural activity, and the same person might both tell fortunes and supply pharmaka. According to Demosthenes, Eunomus – who acquired Theoris' potions and incantations after her death – claimed to be able to cure epilepsy, and Theoris may also have claimed that her pharmaka could heal. Plutarch describes Theoris as a hiereia or priestess – though, unusually for Plutarch, does not identify the deity she served – but he may be conflating her with Ninos.

Some time before 323 (Note: Collins dates Theoris to before 338 BC; Eidinow to before 323.) Theoris was put on trial in Athens, convicted, and executed along with her children. Plutarch claims that the prosecution was brought by Demosthenes. It is not certain exactly what crime Theoris was charged with, as the surviving ancient sources differ. According to Demosthenes it was for casting incantations and using harmful drugs; Philochorus reports that she was charged with asebeia (impiety); and Plutarch says that she was convicted of "committing many misdeeds and teaching the slaves to deceive".

== Crime ==
Most of the scholarly attention to the case of Theoris has focused on identifying the exact charge which was brought against her, which is complicated by the brevity of and inconsistencies between the three ancient sources which discuss her.

In classical Athens, using magic was not in itself criminal, though using potions or drugs to kill was. Derek Collins suggests that Theoris was probably charged with this crime, intentional homicide by poisoning. If that were the case, she would have been tried before the Areopagus. (Note: The Areopagus was the name for a rock outcrop in Athens, and the court that sat there; it was responsible for trials for intentional homicide and wounding, and arson.) Alternatively, she may have been charged with bouleusis (planning) to commit homicide, and been tried at the Palladion. (Note: The court that sat in front of the Palladion, the cult image of Athena on the Acropolis, was responsible for cases of unintentional wounding, killing a non-Athenian, and bouleusis.) As Theoris' family were executed with her, Collins argues that the former scenario is more likely.

According to Philochorus, Theoris was prosecuted for asebeia. In classical Athens, the law against asebeia potentially applied to a very wide variety of possible actions: the law probably did not define what constituted impiety, and it will have been the responsibility of the prosecutor to show that the accused's actions were covered under the law. Michael Rinella argues that sorcery could be prosecuted under the law against impiety. However, Collins argues that this was not the case, as aside from Theoris there is no evidence for the prosecution of witches in classical Athens.

Matthew Dickie argues that Philochorus is correct in identifying Theoris' crime as asebeia. He observes that only in the most serious cases, such as asebeia, were slaves encouraged to denounce their owners; the fact that according to Against Aristogeiton Theoris' maid informed against her suggests that her crime was asebeia rather than simple homicide. Esther Eidinow suggests that Theoris's offences were more to do with offending religious or social sensibilities. She argues that if Theoris had been prosecuted for homicide, the charge would have been described more explicitly in Against Aristogeiton – as it is in Antiphon's speech Against the Stepmother for Poisoning which uses the word phonos ('homicide') to describe a similar crime. A charge of impiety, according to Eidinow, would better explain the reluctance to specify the charge against her in Against Aristogeiton and would explain the description of her in that speech as miaros ('polluted').

== Works cited ==
- Collins, Derek (2000), "The Trial of Theoris of Lemnos: A 4th Century Witch or Folk-Healer?", Western Folklore, 59 (3): 251–278, doi:10.2307/1500236, JSTOR 1500236
- Collins, Derek (2001), "Theoris of Lemnos and the Criminalization of Magic in Fourth-Century Athens", The Classical Quarterly, 5 (1): 477–493, doi:10.1093/cq/51.2.477, JSTOR 3556523
- Collins, Derek (2008), Magic in the Ancient Greek World, Malden: Blackwell, ISBN 978-1-4051-3238-1
- Dickie, Matthew (2003), Magic and Magicians in the Greco-Roman World, London: Routledge, ISBN 0-203-45841-9
- Eidinow, Esther (2010), "Patterns of Persecution: 'Witchcraft' Trials in Classical Athens", Past & Present, 208: 9–35, doi:10.1093/pastj/gtq001
- Eidinow, Esther (2016), Envy, Poison, and Death: Women on Trial in Ancient Athens, Oxford University Press, ISBN 978-0-19-956260-2
- Kennedy, Rebecca Futo (2014), Immigrant Women in Athens: Gender, Ethnicity and Citizenship in the Classical City, New York: Routledge, ISBN 978-0-415-73786-9
- MacDowell, Douglas M. (1999), Athenian Homicide Law in the Age of the Orators, Manchester: Manchester University Press, ISBN 9780719057427
- MacDowell, Douglas M. (2009), Demosthenes the Orator, Oxford: Oxford University Press, ISBN 9780199287192
- Montesano, Marina (2018), Classical Culture and Witchcraft in Medieval and Renaissance Italy, London: Palgrave, ISBN 9783319920788
- Parker, Robert (2005), "Law and Religion", The Cambridge Companion to Ancient Greek Law, Cambridge: Cambridge University Press
- Rinella, Michael A. (2010), Pharmakon: Plato, Drug Culture, and Identity in Ancient Athens, Lexington Books, ISBN 978-0-7391-4686-6
