= Boom Boom Ox =

Decorated ox used for fortune-telling

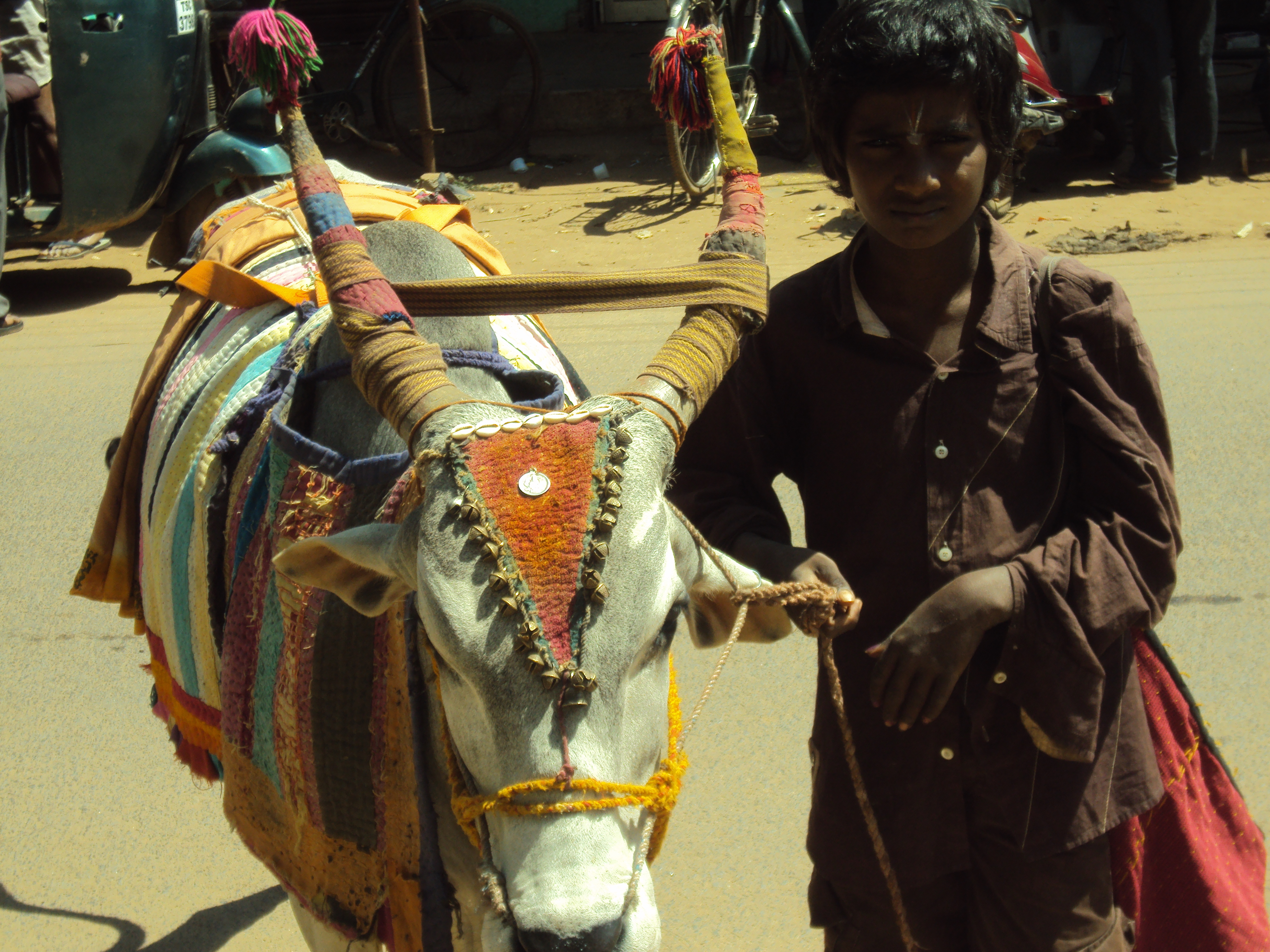
A fortune-teller with his Boom Boom Ox

A Boom Boom Ox (Tamil: பூம் பூம் மாடு) is a decorated ox used in Tamil Nadu, India for fortune-telling by the Boom Boom Mattukaran tribe. These oxen are decorated with jewellery, bells and bright cloth and are led by fortune tellers to individual houses or places where people gather. The patron usually stands in front of the ox and the fortune teller. The fortune teller asks the ox questions in a sing-song voice about the future of the patron. The Ox is trained to nod yes or no for the questions and from its head nods, the fortune teller tells the fortune of the patron. The term "Boom Boom Ox" is also used an insult in Tamil to denote a yes man or a weak willed person.
