= The Year My Parents Ruined My Life =

Book by Martha Freeman

- Author: Martha Freeman
- Language: English
- Publisher: Yearling Books
- Publication date: 1997
- Publication place: United States
- Pages: 184
- ISBN: 0-440-41533-0

The Year My Parents Ruined My Life is a 1997 novel written by Martha Freeman.

== Plot ==
12-year-old Kate Sommers lives in the fictional Isla Nada, California: she is the president of her sixth grade class and she plays volleyball. Her best friend is class secretary Molly Blossom. Kate also has a boyfriend, a 13-year-old surfer named Josh. She plans to join the Isla Nada Sting Rays in the spring, attend the Valentine dance with Josh and learn to skate in vertical skates in the spring. Her plans are derailed when her father announces the family is moving to Belletoona, Pennsylvania (a portmanteau of Belleview and Altoona), where he has acquired an important new job. Though Kate vocally opposes the move, protesting and even skipping meals by way of a "hunger strike", the family is set to move away before Thanksgiving. With help from Molly, a desperate Kate plans "Operation Defrost": she will save up for a plane ticket back to Isla Nada and "fly back home" as soon as she can, which she hopes will shock her parents into understanding how miserable she is in Belletoona. In the meantime, Molly will convince her parents to let Kate live with her for the next five-and-a half-years, until the pair can graduate from high school. She promises Josh to return to Isla Nada in time for the Valentine dance, implying their relationship will continue long-distance.

Kate is predictably miserable in Pennsylvania. Belletoona is a very small town compared to Isla Nada and, in Kate's eyes, ugly and bereft of color. She has trouble adjusting to snow, low temperatures and things like snow-shoveling and dressing in many layers to go out. She has to wear an ugly, bright red hand-me-down coat on her first day of school. Kate keeps seeing a 'phantom' (a white shape darting around the edges of her vision), but nobody believes her.

School is no better, as the principal believes the Sommers family caused a car crash that has left him in a neck brace (for which he implies he will sue them) and Kate's classmates are quick to make fun of her. Her homeroom teacher Mr. Clouse assigns Tiffany Foster as Kate's guide. Tiffany is unpleasant to Kate, leaving her behind when the lunch bell rings and sneaking cigarettes in front of Kate. She calls Kate a chicken when she refuses a cigarette, then warns her that she'll make her life difficult if she 'finks'. The girls are almost caught by the hall monitor Mrs. Ketchum, but Tiffany is surprisingly adept at innocent lies. With no letters from Josh, few letters from Molly and her mother occupying the house landline most nights, Kate feels alone and isolated. She fortifies herself with thoughts of Operation Defrost and takes refuge in her schoolwork, reasoning that she'll be gone soon: in the meantime, she can cope by "being a nun" and quietly doing her schoolwork. At school, she avoids Tiffany and instead spends her lunch sitting with Minh Duc, a quiet Vietnamese girl. Her writing assignments get consistently high grades.

Kate soon discovers that, while she considered herself 'normal' in Isla Nada, this is not the case in Belletoona. Most of the people in California were upper middle class, while Belletoona has a clear divide between blue-collar workers and 'rich people', with Kate being considered the latter due to her father's position as manager of a snow shovel factory. This baffles Kate, as she doesn't consider herself rich at all. After an incident in which she attempts to offer to lend Minh Duc lunch money (her mother is unable to bring lunch for her that day) and a girl named Ashley catches sight of Kate's babysitting savings, the rest of the kids take to jokingly ask her for loans.

Molly responds sparingly to Kate's letters. Over Christmas, Josh sends her socks and signs the card with 'from' instead of 'love', which depresses Kate. While out shoveling snow with her father, an icicle strikes her in the eyebrow, forcing her to spend the rest of the day at the hospital. By the time school restarts, Kate is exhausted and ready to go forward with Operation Defrost. Though Molly is still elusive, she leaves Kate a message on the answering machine implying that she has gotten her parents' permission to house Kate. At school, Minh Duc has a sledding accident. Kate takes her to the school nurse, where they are met by Mr. Payne, who claims Minh Duc's "Asian DNA" makes her incapable of sledding and implies he will bar Asians from the activity to prevent accidents. Kate blurts out that Mr. Payne's reasoning is stupid before she can stop herself, cementing Mr. Payne's hatred of her.

Tiffany is finally caught smoking by Mrs. Ketchum, though the students all disagree on what has happened to her (some say she was suspended, some say she was expelled, while others say she was fined and will return to school once she pays). Ashley and Madison believe Kate revealed Tiffany's smoking and confront her about it, which angers Kate: she did not tell, and considers Tiffany wasn't very discrete about her smoking in the first place. Tiffany does not return to school for a while.

A few weeks later, Kate runs into Mr. Payne in the girls' bathroom. He asks to check Kate's backpack, which Kate readily agrees to, though she notices the bag's buckle is already undone. She is horrified when the principal finds a pack of cigarettes inside, which Kate deduces were put there by Madison. The principal, whose lawyer has been sending letters to the Sommerses demanding money to avoid a lawsuit, seems half-elated to have caught Kate at wrongdoing and tells her to get her things and go to his office, reminding her in parting that the school has no tolerance for underage smoking. She returns to homeroom to find Madison and Ashley barely able to contain their laughter, and Minh Duc apparently ashamed to look at her. Overwhelmed by the circumstances, Kate flees the school without stopping by the principal's office.

Kate walks home in a daze and decides to initiate Operation Defrost. She calls an airline and finds a seat, though the price is more than twice the amount she had expected. She gives them her mother's credit card information, promising herself to pay her back by babysitting. She calls Molly to alert her of her arrival and writes a letter for her parents to find. Though she takes the wrong bus and has to lie repeatedly, she eventually makes it onto a plane for California.

Molly and, surprisingly, Josh are waiting for her at the airport in California. Kate is taken aback at how distant Josh is, but decides she is imagining things. The two take seats together in front of her in the bus heading for Isla Nada, and Molly falls asleep in the middle of Kate's story, leaning on Josh's shoulder. Josh is unusually stern with Kate when she attempts to wake Molly up. As the airport shuttle arrives at Isla Nada, Molly wakes up and reveals that she never got her parents' permission: her father is away on business and her mother isn't even expecting Kate. She also calls Josh "honey", revealing that they are dating. Kate breaks down in tears. Once they arrive at their stop, Josh offers Kate a weak apology and leaves as Molly attempts to set a date.

The lights are on inside Molly's house, indicating they can't sneak in through the window. Mrs. Blossom is waiting for them in the living room: she tells them that Kate's mother called and that the two of them pieced together the plan. She tells Kate to call her mother immediately, and informs Molly that she's grounded 'until she's 21'.

Over the phone, Kate's parents and Danielle are tearful and relieved she's alright. They'd called the airline and discovered her aboard the plane, but had been unable to do much more. Danielle informs her that they've found a cat - Kate asks if it's white, finally discovering the identity of the white phantom she'd been seeing. Danielle accidentally reveals that they'd put the cat in her room, where she'd broken Kate's entire seashell collection to 'smithereens'. Although she cries over her seashell collection, Kate assures her parents she will return to Belletoona, as the things she was hoping to find in Isla Nada are gone.

Molly's mother drives Kate to the airport on Sunday morning, two days after Kate's arrival, and even suspends Molly's grounding so she can see her friend off. During a traffic jam, Molly apologizes profusely to Kate, who discovers she doesn't hate Molly for 'stealing' Josh; Kate figures he's hardly worth it, after sending her socks for Christmas, not ending things with her and treating her like a pit stop when they were together. Before she leaves, she confesses to a horrified Molly that she feels like Belletoona is where she should be, and jokes that she'll come back 'in nine years', which is how long is left until Molly turns 21 (and is un-grounded).

Kate is terrified to return to school on Monday. She finally enters the classroom to discover a substitute teacher. Minh Duc informs her that she told her father about Mr. Payne's racist remarks: her father complained to the board, which then fired Mr. Payne before he could put Kate's case through. It has also put Mr. Clouse in the post of acting principal. Mr. Payne gets into further trouble when Mr. Mooney catches him bowling without his neck brace, revealing that he had been feigning the injuries he was threatening to sue the Sommerses over. While this grants the Sommerses the grounds to countersue, Mrs. Sommers persuades her husband to leave it at that and stop the cycle of retaliation. Tiffany also returns to school, having only been suspended for a week. She eventually approaches Kate to ask about running away to Isla Nada, seemingly impressed by Kate's guts, and reveals she has never been outside Pennsylvania. Though Kate doesn't view her ordeal as an adventure and doesn't want to talk about it, the story seems to earn her Tiffany's respect.

By the 13th of February, Kate and Minh Duc have formed their own little group of friends: they now hang out with Jenny and Megan, two other quiet girls. When she checks her Valentine's mailbox, Kate is shocked to find numerous Valentine's Day cards, including ones from Tiffany (who doodles a smoky cigarette on her card), Ashley and Madison. Kate concludes that while she viewed them all the same at the start, her classmates are regular kids; some of them aren't nice, some of them are OK and some of them are very nice. The book ends with Kate learning how to ice skate with Peter Douglas, feeling content as the snowflakes brush against her face.

== Characters ==
=== Isla Nada ===
Kate Sommers: The protagonist. 12 years old, Kate loves the beach, the ocean, and initially hates cold weather with a passion. She enjoys being social, though she goes through a period of intense social withdrawal after her arrival in Pennsylvania, earning herself a reputation as "the quiet kid" in school. She is fond of seashells, which she collects and is reasonably knowledgeable about. She dreams of studying marine biology someday. It's implied that Kate writes well, as she gets an A+ for her story about 'the year [her] parents ruined [her] life' and warms up to Mr. Clouse's writing exercises from there. Kate's initial plan for life at Belletoona involves being 'a nun': she plans to stay away from everyone and mind her own business, as she intends to be gone soon.

Kate occasionally gives herself pep talks. When she does, she hears them in the voice of Noah, her coach from the volleyball team who had a New York accent.

Kate loves sports, playing volleyball in Isla Nada and then taking up skating in Belletoona. She also discovers a love of sledding and, once she learns it's possible in Belletoona, intends to take up vertical skating.

Angela Sommers: Kate's mother. A self-described "California girl", she commuted to her work as a film editor in Los Angeles every day while the Sommerses lived in Isla Nada. She wore short skirts, big earrings and bangle bracelets. While she knew how to make guacamole from real avocados, she did not cook often California (resorting to cereals and takeout). As the move forces her to quit her job, she expresses an interest in "homey pursuits" like baking upon their arrival in Pennsylvania. Although her initial attempts at home cooking are terrible, she makes excellent hot chocolate. Like her daughter, Angela has a hard time coping with the move, growing distraught over weight gain and not having a job. In the end, she gets a job as an assistant at the bakery by the Belletoona courthouse. Kate finds her mother's new job a mystery, noting that her Valentine cookies taste fine but look like they suffered 'a geologic episode', resulting in their looking nothing at all like a heart. Despite this, Mrs. Sommers becomes adept at baking scones, making many different kinds for her family.

Coldwell Sommers: Kate's father. When the lawn-mower company he works at closes, he is given a job at a snow shovel company in Pennsylvania, where he moves his entire family. He grew up in Buffalo, which Kate thinks explains his excitement at the move. Due to his upbringing, he is much better adapted to life in Pennsylvania than the rest of his family, constantly reliving memories like walking home in the snow as a boy. He likes war movies and sometimes uses jargon learned from them, though he has never served in the army. He is doggedly optimistic, selling his snow shovels with unmatched zeal and offering free snow-shoveling seminars to everyone he knows. He refuses to believe his latest snow shovel model (called the Flying Penguin) is a dud until his neighbor Mr. Douglas buys a snow blower, then creates a picket fence of broken Flying Penguins.

Danielle Sommers: Six-year-old sister of Kate. Nicknamed 'the pest' by her older sister, Danielle learned to read when she was four and frequently reads books far above her age level. This has given her a broad vocabulary that Kate thinks makes Danielle sound 'like a forty year old woman'. Unlike her sister, she is eager about the move, the weather and the new house. Though they fight often and Danielle seems eager to one-up Kate, she loves and trusts her older sister, going to Kate for comfort when her parents aren't available and growing distraught at the thought of Kate dying or leaving. She refers to her parents as "Mother" and "Father", more formally compared to Kate's "Mom" and "Dad". Although she's smart, Danielle is still a six-year-old, liable to cry when she suffers accidents and haplessly speaking her mind. She also refers to herself as the "dancing-ballerina-snowflake princess," with her own dance.

Molly Blossom: Kate's best friend in Isla Nada. She served as class secretary the year Kate moved to Belletoona. She loves going to the mall and shopping sprees, so much that Kate finds it baffling. She has four holes in each ear. She has been Kate's best friend "forever", and is described as 'always there in a pinch'. She tried cigarettes at some point, until Kate convinced her it was disgusting habit and she stopped. She falls for Josh in Kate's absence and starts dating him without telling her best friend. Once they're discovered, she is deeply apologetic. Kate describes Molly as an optimist, and thinks she's a good person - the problem was she always "got distracted by something before she was done".

Josh Bennett: Pale-haired, blue-eyed, broad-shouldered and tan, Kate thinks he should be on TV instead of watching it. He is a surfer. At the start of the book, he has been dating Kate "since August". While Kate says she is lucky to have him, her parents dislike Josh (her father always asks him why he "never has homework" and her mother always 'forgets' to buy Josh's favorite brand of Doritos) and Kate herself sometimes claims she feels like a pit-stop, as Josh always seems to be in a rush to go somewhere else. He met Kate at the Shake Shack and dreams of opening up a surf shop, possibly in Maui. Although he apparently accepts the long-distance arrangement, he slowly becomes more distant and finally starts dating Molly without telling Kate. He is sullen and unapologetic when they are discovered, after which Kate decides he's a jerk and that he is only gorgeous on the outside. Danielle thinks he's pretty, but that's all he is. At the end of the book, he seems to have broken up with Molly too, as he takes Amanda to the Valentine dance.

Amanda: moved to Isla Nada from San Francisco earlier in the school year. She joins the volleyball team and knows how to 'spike' a volleyball. She is described as wearing old-fashioned hippie clothes. Kate and Molly decide early on that her clothes are ugly, and Kate is annoyed at how Josh's friends often look at Amanda. She also remembers feeling a stab of jealousy the day Amanda appeared at a Shake Shack where she and Josh were at together, when Josh smiled at her. When Kate moves to Belletoona, she remembers being neither nice nor mean to Amanda, and wishes she'd been kinder. Amanda and Molly become friends in Kate's absence, with Amanda seemingly filling in Kate's role as a positive influence in Molly's life: she chastens Molly for shoplifting and dismisses Josh as "immature", despite Kate and Amanda worrying that she had a crush on him. Josh ends up taking her to the Valentine's Day prom. Amanda never appears in the book, but she is often mentioned by Kate and Molly. Despite her comments, she goes to the Valentine dance with Josh.

"Gramma": Angela's mother and Kate's grandmother. She lives in Isla Nada. Though she is widowed, she is very independent and physically fit, as she takes a swim in the ocean every morning. She also plays tennis, and was elected president of her tennis club the year Kate and her family moved to Belletoona. Like her granddaughter, she is fond of the ocean, and is the one who taught Kate about seashells and ocean animals. She and Kate are close, as she is the only adult who Kate feels comfortable venting about what really happens to her at Belletoona.

=== Belletoona ===
Mr. and Mrs. Douglas: the neighbors from across the street. Mrs. Douglas is an excellent cook, and often sends her son over with food for the Sommers family. She also provides Mrs. Sommers with recipes.

Peter Douglas: the neighbors' son. He has red hair, and barely spoke a word to Kate when they met. Though he is described as skinny, he can eat a surprising amount of food. If he were less skinny and if his nose were "shorter" Kate believes he would be cute. Danielle says he has kind eyes and that she likes him better than Josh.

Mrs. Tonya Mooney: the next-door-neighbor. Owner of a blue Eldorado that got a bent fender in a car pileup outside the Sommers house on the day they move in. She is holds no ill will about it however, and brings the Sommers family freshly baked cookies the following day. She offers Kate a job as babysitter to her son Nicky.

Nicky Mooney: the Mooneys' infant son. Kate babysits him for 'airfare money'. He is usually dressed in red, and is prone to crying. Kate discovers she can soothe him by singing 'Jingle Bells'. Mrs. Mooney claims Kate is the one babysitter he has taken to in his life.

Mr. Doyle Payne: Mr. Payne crashes his car in the Sommers house pileup. He (wrongly) blames the Sommerses for the accident, complaining about pain and making veiled threats about having a family member who is a lawyer in Philadelphia. To Kate's horror, he turns out to be the principal of Byrd, the school she is enrolled in. He is soon nicknamed Mr. "Payne-in-the-neck" by Kate's father. He wears a neck brace for months, complaining about pain from the accident, and has his lawyer send the Sommerses threatening letters.

Mr. Clouse: Kate's homeroom teacher. He has been teaching sixth grade for forty years, and plans to retire to Florida and 'hang up his snow shovel for good' in June of that year. He is kind and compassionate, ignoring Mr. Payne's fabricated complaints about the Sommers family and being understanding of Kate's difficulties adapting to her new environment. He reveals to her that his parents also made him move when he was a child, and that he only found it in him to forgive them as an adult.

Tiffany Foster: the popular girl at Kate's new school. She is described as a "pretty, petite" girl. Her features are so delicate, Kate feels like an overgrown Golden Retriever in her presence. She smokes in the first grade bathroom. She used to babysit Nicky Mooney, but quit when she got a boyfriend. She is class president and gets good grades, though Kate thinks this is inexplicable, since Tiffany is 'dumb enough to smoke'. Tiffany takes an instant dislike to Kate when they meet and goes out of her way to antagonize her. She is temporarily suspended from school for smoking. Upon her return, she seems to gain a new respect for Kate upon hearing of her escape from Belletoona.

Ryan Kuhn: one of Kate's classmates. He is the first to speak to her - by making fun of how Kate pronounces 'Isla Nada'. Kate deduces he is one of the popular boys and considers him stuck-up. He is apparently dating Tiffany. Despite this, Ryan often compliments Kate and attempts to hang around her. Kate firmly believes these comments are ironic and often reacts with anger. However, it is implied that Ryan really did have a crush on her, as he gives her a specially ordered, personalized card for Valentine's Day.

Madison: Tiffany's friend. She is described as 'square' instead of petite, and not too bright. She is more of a sycophant than a true friend of Tiffany's, laughing loudly at all of Tiffany's quips and attempts to imitate her, up to and including smoking (despite how the cigarettes make her sick enough to vomit). Tiffany calls her 'Mad-One'. When she mistakenly believes Kate told on Tiffany's smoking, she frames Kate for smoking herself. She has a crush on a boy named Preston, who simply thinks she's "fat".

Minh Duc: an Asian girl. She and Kate sit together at lunch, occasionally smiling at each other and saying nothing. It is revealed that, while she looks Asian, she was born in Pennsylvania; Kate thought she didn't know English well enough to speak, bug Minh Duc explains that she's fluent - she's just shy. She is afraid of sleighs ever since she had a childhood accident on one, which leads her to close her eyes when she rides one. This, of course, leads to further accidents. However, she grows more confident and even starts going sledding of her own volition when Kate discovers a love for it. It's implied that she's Kate's best friend in Belletoona.

Megan: a quiet girl. Her mother runs the Belletoona bakery and makes perfectly shaped heart cookies, complete with icing and sprinkles. Megan befriends Kate and Minh Duc some time after Kate returns from running away to California.

Jenny: also described as a quiet girl. She is present when Mr. Payne busts Kate for having cigarettes in her backpack, looking on the scene with terror and bolting once the principal orders her out. She too befriends Kate and Minh Duc after Kate returns.
