= Democles =

Athenian orator

Democles (Ancient Greek: Δημοκλῆς; fl. 4th century BC) was an Athenian orator, and a contemporary of Demochares, among whose opponents he is mentioned.

He was a disciple of Theophrastus, and was chiefly known as the defender of the children of Lycurgus against the calumnies of Moerocles and Menesaechmus. It seems that in the time of Dionysius of Halicarnassus, some orations of Democles were still extant, since that critic attributes to him an oration, which went by the name of Dinarchus. It must be observed that Dionysius and the Suda call this orator by the patronymic form of his name, Democleides, so he may be the same person called Democleides who was the eponymous archon in 316 BC.

He wrote a treatise on machinery.
