= Philinus =

Philinus (Greek: Φιλῖνος) may refer to:

- Philinus of Agrigentum (3rd century BC), historian who accompanied Hannibal in his campaigns against Rome
- Philinus of Athens (4th century BC), orator
- Philinus of Cos (3rd century BC), physician - reputed founder of the Empiric school
- Philinus of Cos (athlete) (3rd century BC), athlete and five times Olympic winner
