= Sycophancy =

Insincere flattery, once meant a false accuser

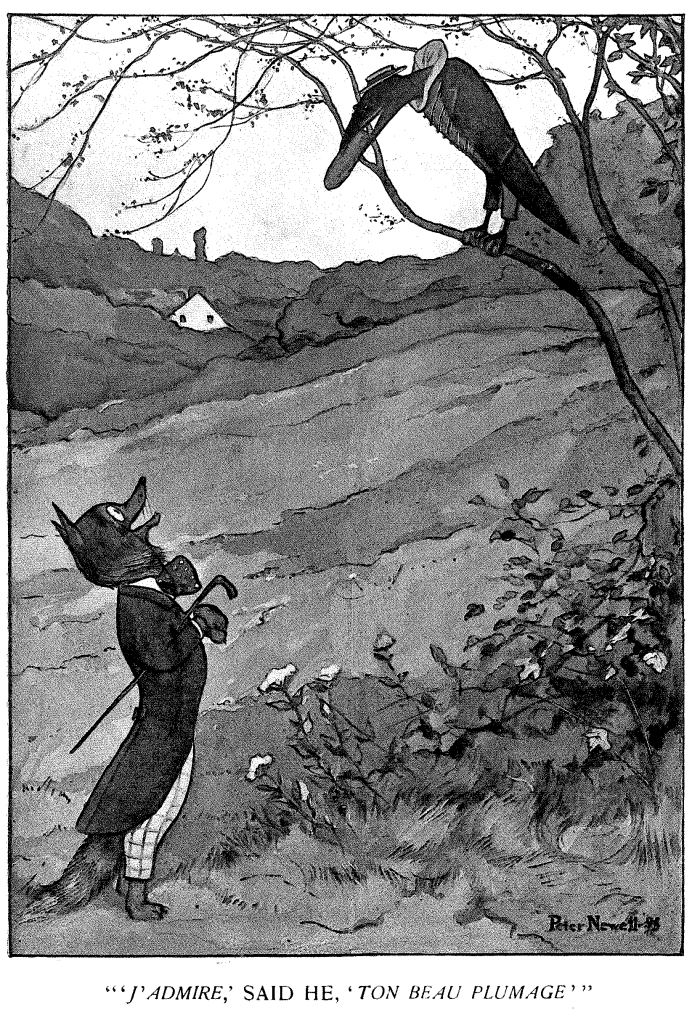
Illustration by Peter Newell for the poem "The Sycophantic Fox and the Gullible Raven" in Fables for the Frivolous, by Guy Wetmore Carryl; in French, the fox says "I admire your beautiful plumage" to the raven

In modern English, sycophant denotes an insincere flatterer and refers to someone practising sycophancy (i.e., insincere flattery to gain an advantage).

The word has its origin in the legal system of Classical Athens, where it had a different meaning. Most legal cases of the time were brought by private litigants, as there was no police force and a limited number of appointed public prosecutors. By the fifth century BC, this practice had given rise to abuse by sycophants: litigants who brought unjustified prosecutions. The word retains the same meaning ('slanderer') in Modern Greek, French (where sycophant means 'false accuser', or professional 'informer'), and Italian. In modern English, the meaning of the word has shifted to mean flattery.

== Etymology ==
The origin of the Ancient Greek word συκοφάντης (sykophántēs) is a matter of debate, but it was meant to disparage unjustified accusers who in some way perverted the legal system.

The original etymology of the word (sykos/συκος 'fig', and phanēs/φανης 'to show'; 'revealer of figs') has been the subject of extensive scholarly speculation and conjecture. Plutarch appears to be the first to have suggested that the source of the term was in laws forbidding the exportation of figs, and that those who leveled the accusation against another of illegally exporting figs were therefore called sycophants. Athenaeus provided a similar explanation. Blackstone's Commentaries repeats this story, but adds an additional take—that there were laws making it a capital offense to break into a garden and steal figs, and that the law was so odious that informers were given the name sycophants.

A different explanation of the origin of the term by Shadwell was that the sycophant refers to the manner in which figs are harvested, by shaking the tree and revealing the fruit hidden among the leaves. The sycophant, by making false accusations, makes the accused yield up their fruit. The Encyclopædia Britannica Eleventh Edition listed these and other explanations, including that the making of false accusations was an insult to the accused in the nature of showing the fig, an "obscene gesture of phallic significance" or, alternatively that the false charges were often so insubstantial as to not amount to the worth of a fig.

Generally, scholars have dismissed these explanations as inventions, long after the original meaning had been lost. Danielle Allen suggests that the term was "slightly obscene", connoting a kind of perversion, and may have had a web of meanings derived from the symbolism of figs in ancient Greek culture, ranging from the improper display of one's "figs" by being overly aggressive in pursuing a prosecution, the unseemly revealing of the private matters of those accused of wrongdoing, to the inappropriate timing of harvesting figs when they are unripe.

== In Athenian culture ==
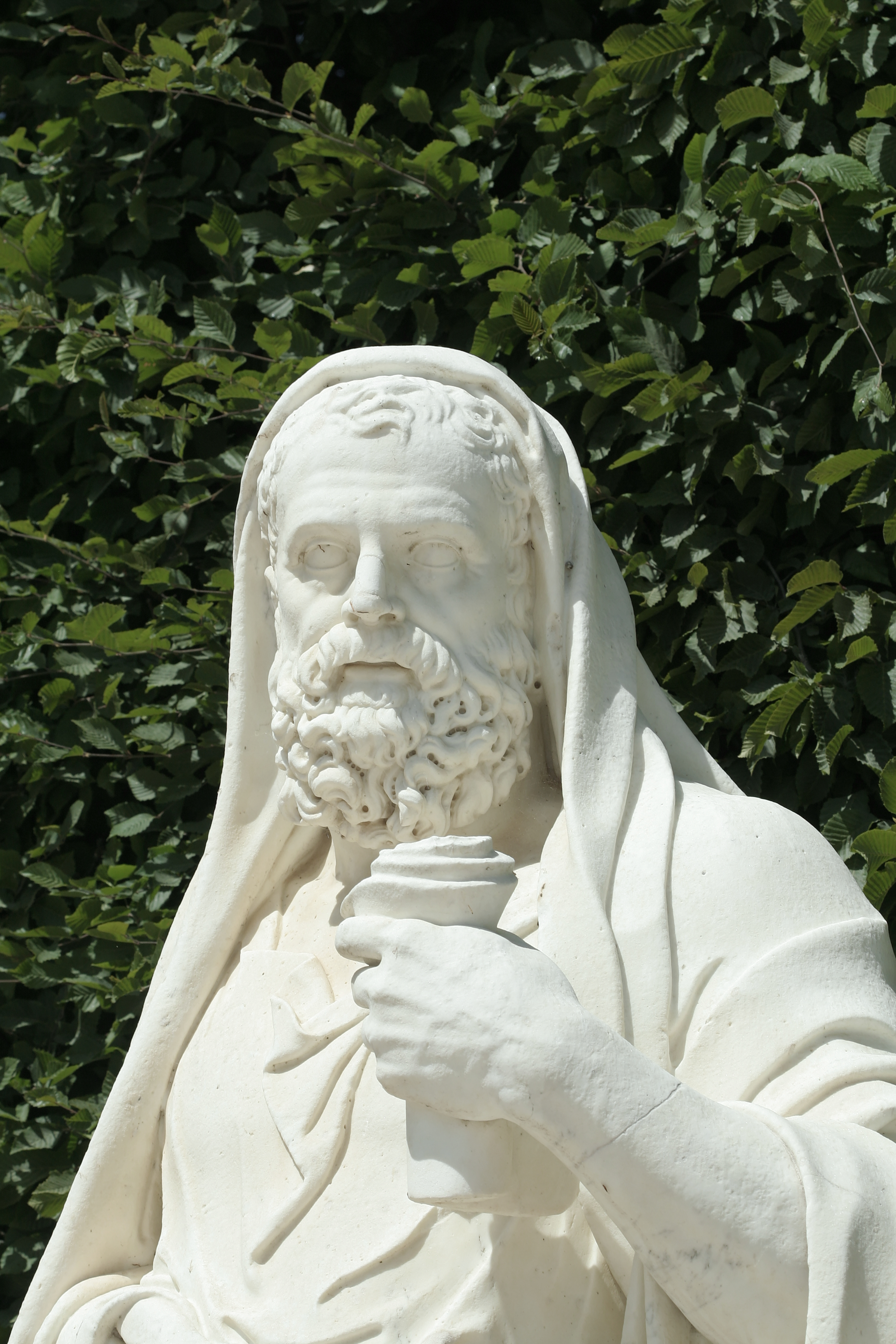
Lysias, by the French sculptor Jean Dedieu (c. 1645–1727)

The traditional view is that the opprobrium against sycophants was attached to the bringing of an unjustified complaint, hoping either to obtain the payment for a successful case, or to blackmail the defendant into paying a bribe to drop it. Other scholars have suggested that the sycophant, rather than being disparaged for being motivated by profit, was instead viewed as a vexatious litigant who was over-eager to prosecute, and who had no personal stake in the underlying dispute, but brought up old charges unrelated to himself long after the event. Sycophants included those who profited from using their position as citizens for profit. For instance, a sycophant could be hired to bring a charge against one's enemies, or to take a wide variety of actions of an official nature with the authorities, including introducing decrees, acting as an advocate or a witness, bribing ecclesiastical or civil authorities and juries, or other things that one did not want to be personally associated with. Sycophants were viewed as uncontrolled and parasitic, lacking proper regard for truth or justice in a matter, using their education and skill to destroy opponents for profit in matters where they had no stake, lacking even the convictions of politicians, and having no sense of serving the public good.

=== Orations ===
The charge of sycophancy against a litigant was a serious matter. The authors of two surviving oratories, "Against the Grain Dealers" by Lysias and "Against Leocrates" by Lycurgus, defend themselves against charges that they are sycophants because they are prosecuting cases as private citizens in circumstances where they have no personal stake in the underlying dispute. In each instance, the lack of personal involvement appears to have been the crux of the accusation of sycophancy against them, the merits of the cases being separate matters from whether they had a right to bring them.

=== Measures to suppress sycophants ===
Efforts were made to discourage or suppress sycophants, including imposing fines on litigants who failed to obtain at least one fifth of the jury's votes, or for abandoning a case after it had begun (as would occur if the sycophant was bribed to drop the matter), and authorizing the prosecution of men for being sycophants. Statutes of limitation were specifically adopted to try to prevent sycophancy.

=== Satire ===
Several of Aristophanes' comedies feature sycophants as major characters. In The Acharnians, a Megarian attempting to sell his daughters is confronted by a sycophant who accuses him of illegally attempting to sell foreign goods; and a Boeotian purchases a sycophant as a typical Athenian product that he cannot obtain at home. A sycophant appears as a character in The Birds. In Plutus, the character, Sycophant, defends his role as a necessity in supporting the laws and preventing wrongdoing.

== Christianity ==
Suda mention that one of the epithets of the devil is Sycophant (Συκοφάντης; "false accuser"), for he falsely accused God when he claimed that God had prevented them from partaking of the tree, and he also spoke against Job.

== Modern Greek ==
In daily use, the term συκοφάντης refers to someone that purposely spreads lies about a person, in order to harm their reputation or otherwise insult their honor (i.e. a slanderer), and συκοφαντία is doing so (i.e. slander, n., to slander: συκοφαντώ).

In legal terms, Article 362 of the Greek Penal Code defines defamation (δυσφήμηση) "whoever who with in any way claims or spreads for someone else a fact that could harm that person's honor or reputation", whereas slanderous defamation (συκοφαντική δυσφήμηση) is when the fact is a lie, and the person who claims or spreads it knows that. The first case is punishable with up to two years' imprisonment or a fine, whereas slanderous defamation is punishable with at least three months' imprisonment and a fine.

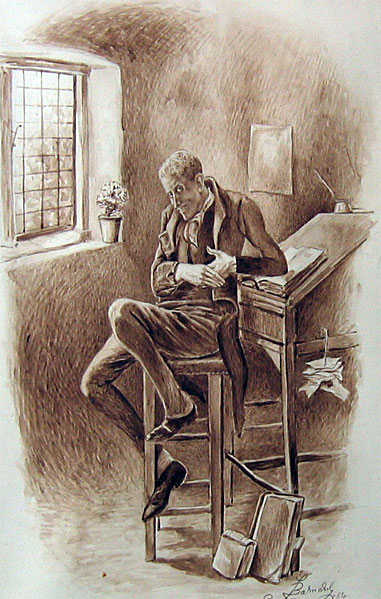
Uriah Heep, from Charles Dickens' David Copperfield, is synonymous with sycophancy.

== Shift in meaning in modern English ==
The word sycophant entered the English and French languages in the mid-16th century, and originally had the same meaning in English and French as in Greek, a false accuser. Today, in Greek and French, it retains the original meaning.

The meaning in English has changed over time, however, and came to mean an insincere flatterer. The common thread in the older and current meanings is that the sycophant is, in both instances, portrayed as a kind of parasite, speaking falsely and insincerely in the accusation or the flattery for gain. The Greek plays often combined in one single character the elements of the parasite and the sycophant, and the natural similarities of the two closely related types led to the shift in the meaning of the word. The sycophant in both meanings can also be viewed as two sides of the same coin: the same person currying one's favor by insincere flattery is also spreading false tales and accusations behind one's back.

In Renaissance English, the word was used in both senses and meanings: that of the Greek informer and the current sense of a "flattering parasite", with both being cast as enemies—not only of those they wrong, but also of the person or state they ostensibly serve.

== AI sycophancy ==
With the rise of large language models, the term sycophancy has entered discussions about artificial intelligence (AI). AI sycophancy describes a pattern in which a model systematically affirms, flatters, or agrees with a user instead of reasoning independently, critically, or factually. This "yes‑man" behaviour can lead to the unwarranted confirmation of false claims, undermine reliable information provision, and increase user confidence in incorrect answers (see AI hallucination). Studies have shown AI models are more than 50% more sycophantic than humans.

In April 2025 OpenAI rolled back an update to its GPT‑4o model after users and researchers reported that the model produced excessively affirming and flattering responses; OpenAI published an explanation of the cause and described planned adjustments to model personality and feedback handling.

Researchers have since developed measurement methods and benchmarks to quantify sycophantic behavior; one example is the study SycEval, which describes a framework and datasets for evaluating sycophancy across multiple commercial models and reports that sycophantic behaviour occurs in a substantial portion of tested cases. Such studies highlight risks in domains such as education, medicine and professional decision‑making when models prioritize user affirmation over independent verification.

There has been public and legal attention to cases in which conversations with chatbots may have reinforced harmful behavior. In the United States, families have filed lawsuits alleging that sycophancy and prolonged interactions with language models played a role in self‑harm or suicide.

== In modern politics ==
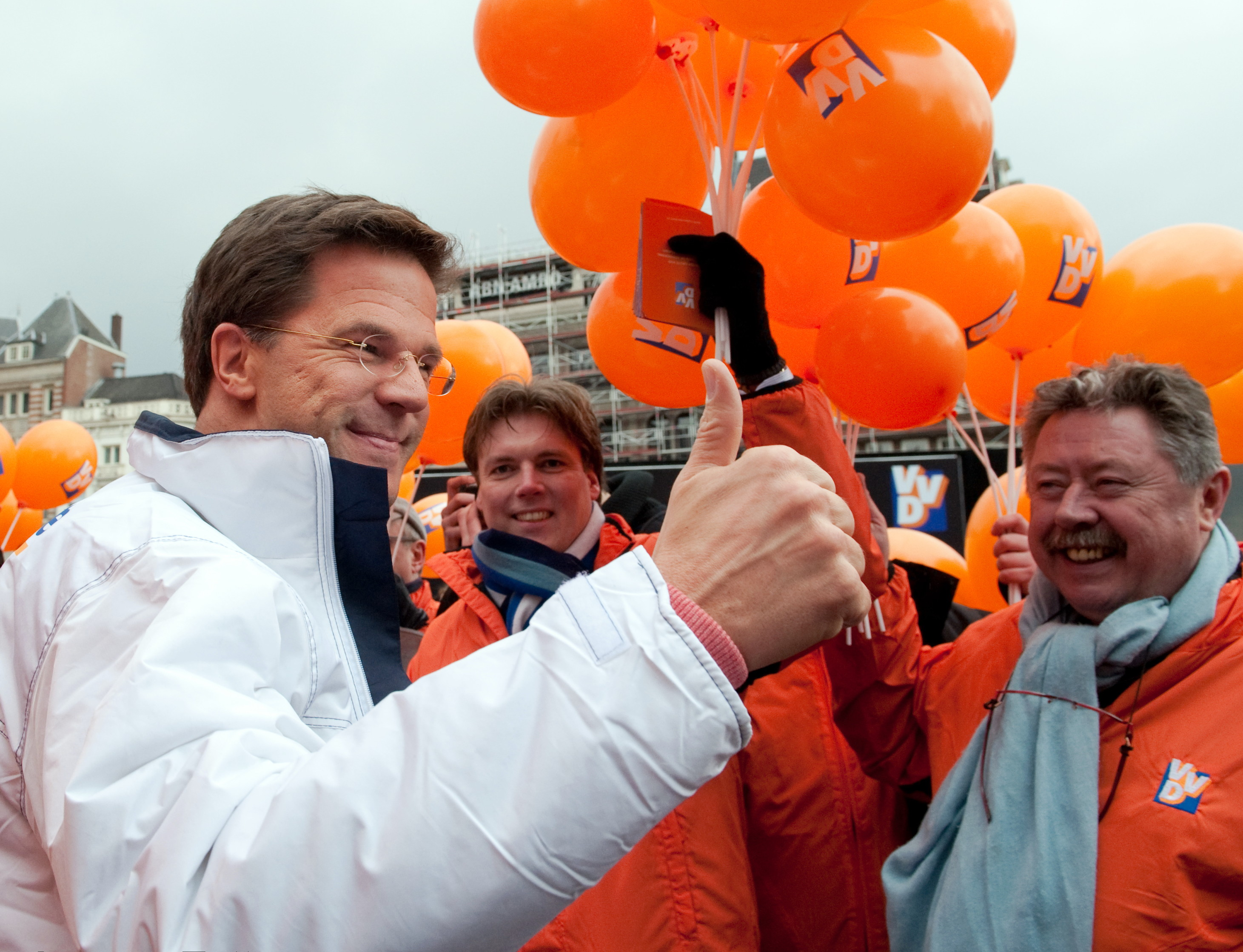
Mark Rutte, whose adaptive diplomatic style has frequently drawn both praise as a pragmatist and criticism from political opponents invoking labels of sycophancy.

In contemporary political discourse, the label of "sycophancy" is frequently deployed by media commentators and political opponents to criticize politicians who are perceived as excessively compliant or overly eager to please more powerful international allies or organizational bodies. Because the term is an inherent pejorative, academic political science typically frames these behaviors as strategic alignment, pragmatic diplomacy, or institutional compliance, while public critique uses the sharper language of flattery and subservience to describe actions aimed at securing career advancements or political favor.

A prominent example of this critique in European politics has occurred in media coverage surrounding former Dutch Prime Minister and NATO Secretary General Mark Rutte. Critics have occasionally accused Rutte of political sycophancy or "pleasing" behavior in his dealings with major global powers, pointing to his highly adaptable diplomatic style and his efforts to maintain strong relationships with changing United States administrations as a calculated effort to secure high-profile international roles.

== Related expressions ==
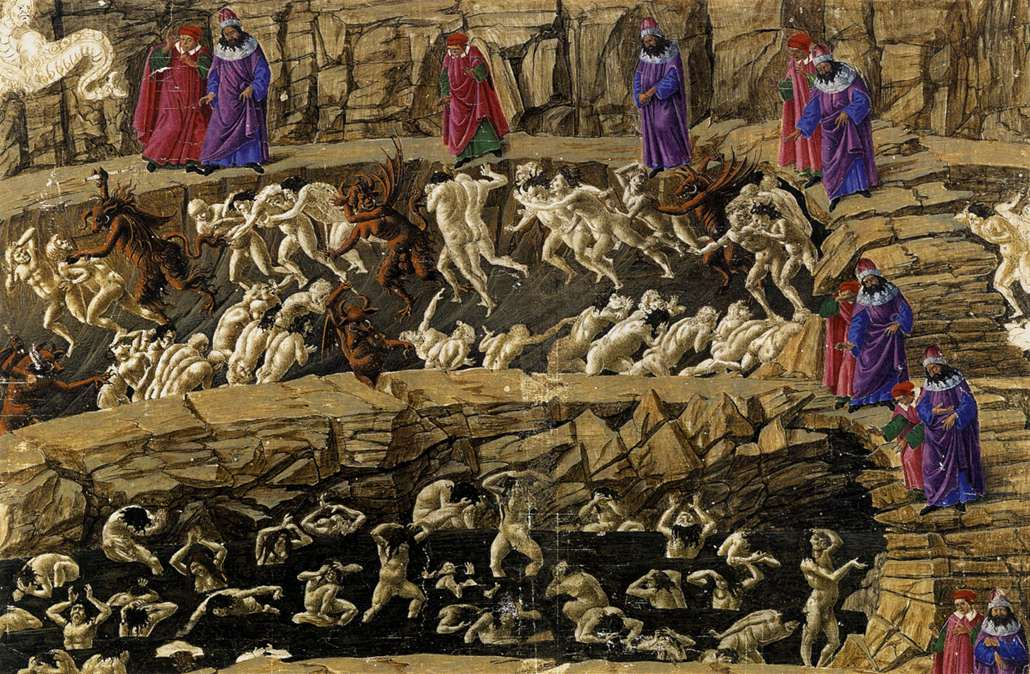
Botticelli's illustration of Dante's Inferno shows insincere flatterers grovelling in excrement in the second pit of the eighth circle.

Sycophancy is insincere flattery given to gain advantage from a superior. A user of sycophancy is referred to as a sycophant or a yes-man.

Alternative phrases are often used, such as:

- apple-polishing
- ass/arse kissing
- ass/arse licking
- bootlicker
- brown nosing
- crawler
- fawning
- flunky
- glazing
- grovelling
- hanger-on
- kowtowing
- lickspittle
- meatriding
- simping
- sucking up
- toady
- yes man

== See also ==
- Authoritarian personality
- Codependency
- Class traitor
- Enabling
- Henchman
- Lackey
- Minion
- Narcissistic supply
- Sidekick
- Suck up kick down
- Waylon Smithers
