= Moerocles =

Ancient Athenian orator

Moerocles (Ancient Greek: Μοιροκλῆς; lived 4th century BC) was an Athenian orator, native of Salamis. He was a contemporary of Demosthenes, and like him an opponent of the kings Philip and Alexander, and was one of the anti-Macedonian orators whom Alexander demanded to have given up to him after the destruction of Thebes, though he subsequently withdrew his demand on the mediation of Demades (335 BC). We find mention of him as the advocate of Theocrines, and in the oration against Theocrines, which was once placed among those of Demosthenes, he is spoken of as the author of a decree in accordance with which the Athenians and their allies joined their forces for the suppression of piracy. On one occasion he was prosecuted by Eubulus for an act of extortion practised upon those who rented the silver mines, and Timocles, the comic poet speaks of him as having received bribes from Harpalus. At one period of his life he had been imprisoned, though we do not know on what charge. He was afterwards the accuser of the sons of Lycurgus, according to a letter ascribed to Demosthenes, but whose authenticity is debated. According to the Pseudo-Plutarch, however, it was Menesaechmus on whose charge they were imprisoned. Moerocles is mentioned by Aristotle.
