= Against Aristogeiton =

Ancient Greek prosecution speeches

Two speeches "Against Aristogeiton" (Ancient Greek: κατὰ Ἀριστογείτονος) are preserved in the corpus of Demosthenes, as speeches 25 and 26. Both purport to come from a prosecution of Aristogeiton initiated by Lycurgus on the grounds that Aristogeiton had initiated prosecutions and made speeches in the assembly when he was disenfranchised. Since the 19th century, the authenticity of both speeches has been doubted.

== Background ==
Not much is known about Aristogeiton other that what is found in the speeches against him. He was a prominent politician in Athens who had already been involved in a number of legal entanglements before the case from which Demosthenes' speeches were given.

The case against Aristogeiton in this suit was that he was a public debtor, and therefore disenfranchised. Aristogeiton had been fined five talents for a charge of graphe paranomon (proposing an illegal decree), and 1,000 drachmas for failing to win one fifth of the jurors' votes in a prosecution he himself had brought. Both of these debts had been doubled, as Aristogeiton had failed to pay them off promptly. Later, these debts had been taken on by his brother, Eunomos, and so Aristogeiton had resumed public life, arguing that he was no longer a debtor to the treasury. His prosecutors argued that, as Eunomos had not finished paying off the debt, Aristogeiton should still be disenfranchised. Aristogeiton also owed a third fine to the treasury, which he had challenged. At the time of the trial, the challenge had not yet been considered; the prosecutors therefore argued that Aristogeiton should still be considered as owing it, and therefore disenfranchised.

The prosecution of Aristogeiton was brought by Lycurgus. The second speech refers to the Battle of Chaeronea, which puts the terminus post quem of the speech at 338 BC; as the trial pre-dates Deinarchos' prosecution of Aristogeiton, it could have been no later than 324 BC.

== Content ==
The first speech against Aristogeiton assumes that the substance of the charges against Aristogeiton have already been proven by the preceding prosecution speakers. Instead of attempting to demonstrate Aristogeiton's guilt, it focuses on attacking him more broadly for his poneria (wickedness). The speaker relates a series of shocking anecdotes about Aristogeiton's conduct, which though not strictly relevant to the charges against him show Aristogeiton in a poor light. Following this, Demosthenes moves on to a more substantial point of law, which he says was not discussed by Lycurgus: he argues that a debt does not cease upon being challenged, but only when that challenge is upheld. The final section of the first speech consists of an examination of pleas which could be made in mitigation, along with an analysis of why they do not apply to Aristogeiton's case.

The second speech is much shorter than the first. Much of the speech discusses the importance of punishing lawbreakers in general – and Aristogeiton, as a prominent politician, in particular. The speech draws parallels with past politicians who were punished for breaking the law.

== Authorship ==
The authorship of both of the speeches against Aristogeiton has long been questioned by scholars. As both are preserved as supporting speeches by Demosthenes at the same trial, and Demosthenes can only have made one such speech, at least one of them must be inauthentic.

The first speech was generally accepted as authentic by ancient authorities – Dionysius of Halicarnassus is the only ancient author to dispute that Demosthenes wrote it. Other ancient authors, including Pliny the Younger and the author of On the Sublime, accept it as Demosthenic. Since the 19th century, however, the authorship has been questioned, primarily on the basis that it makes mistakes about Athenian law which Demosthenes would not have. Additionally, Raphael Sealey challenges the speech on the grounds that it contradicts other sources on Aristogeiton at a number of points. Sealey therefore concludes that the speech was a later rhetorical exercise. Friedrich Blass attributed the speech to Demosthenes, but considered it "repetitive, confused and disorderly" and therefore suggested that it was drafted, but never delivered, by him. More recently, Douglas MacDowell has argued that Against Aristogeiton I is correctly attributed to Demosthenes.

The second speech is generally considered not have been written by Demosthenes. Both Sealey and MacDowell consider it to have been written at the time of the trial, but by a different author. Sealey argues on stylistic grounds that it cannot have been written by Demosthenes – the high number of tribrachs (three consecutive short syllables) was generally avoided by Demosthenes. MacDowell argues that it "lacks the strength of expression" that the first speech has, and is therefore less likely to have been authored by Demosthenes.

== Works cited ==
- MacDowell, D.M. (2009). Demosthenes the Orator. Oxford: Oxford University Press.
- Sealey, Raphael (1960). "Who Was Aristogeiton?". Bulletin for the Institute of Classical Studies. 7: 33–43. doi:10.1111/j.2041-5370.1960.tb00633.x.
- Sealey, Raphael (1967). "Pseudo-Demosthenes XIII and XXV". Revue des Études Grecques. 80 (379): 250–255. doi:10.3406/reg.1967.3947.
- Vince, J. H. (1935). Demosthenes: Orations 21–26: Against Meidias. Against Androtion. Against Aristocrates. Against Timocrates. Against Aristogeiton 1 and 2. Cambridge, MA: Harvard University Press.
