= Boom Boom Mattukaran =

Nomadic tribal people from India

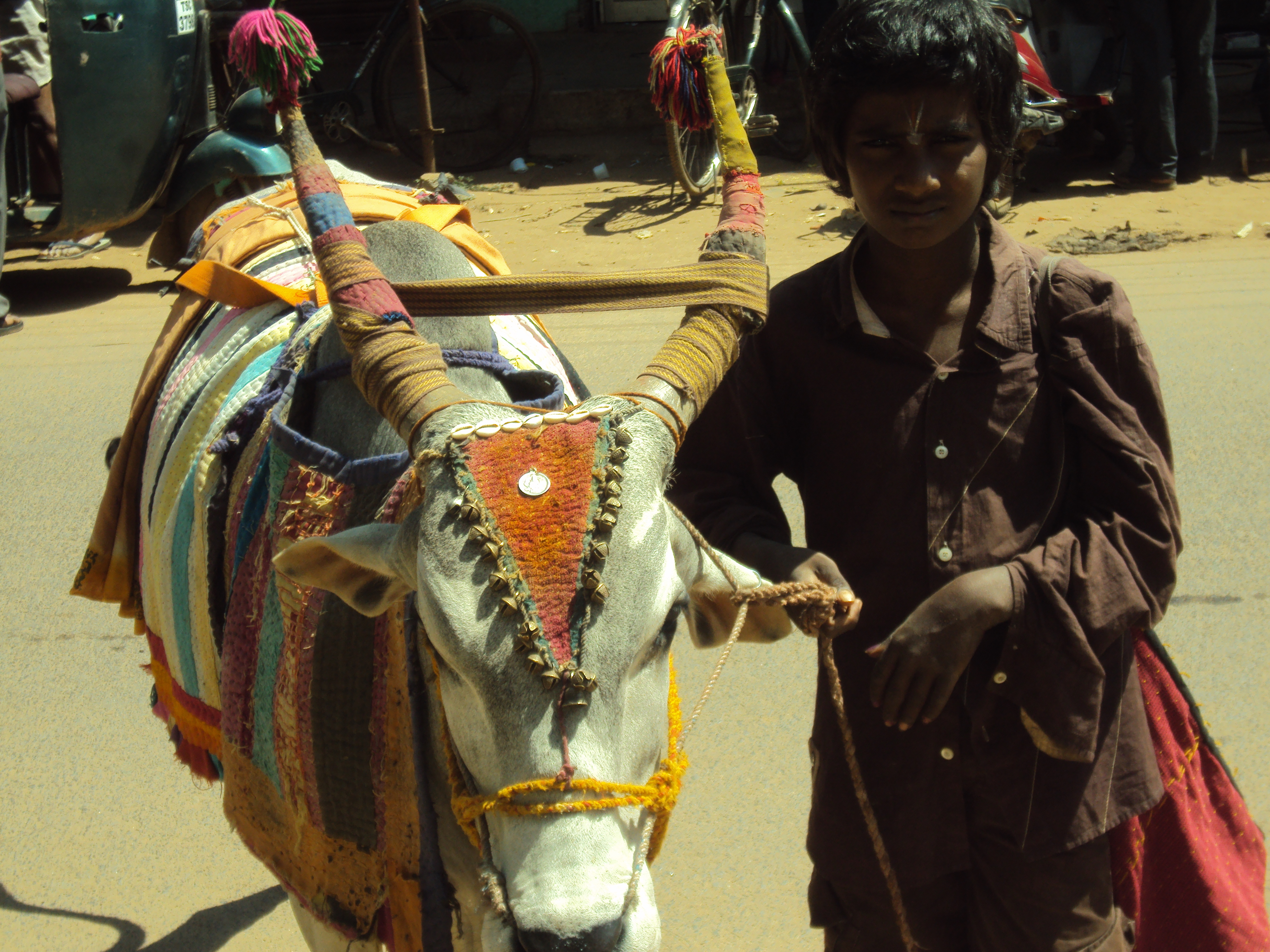
A fortune-teller with his Boom Boom Ox

Boom Boom Mattukaran or Adiyan or Poo Idayar are group of nomadic tribal people found primarily in Tamil Nadu and Kerala states of India. They historically made a living by travelling from place to place with a decorated bull, entertaining and fortune telling using what is generally termed a Boom Boom Ox. They are believed to have originated from Andhra Pradesh state and speak in Tamil intermixed with Telugu. Their traditional livelihood is no longer sustainable and they survive on begging and labour work. There are a number of private and government initiatives to settle them and provide education to integrate them with settled society.
