= Echedemos =

Ancient Greek statesman

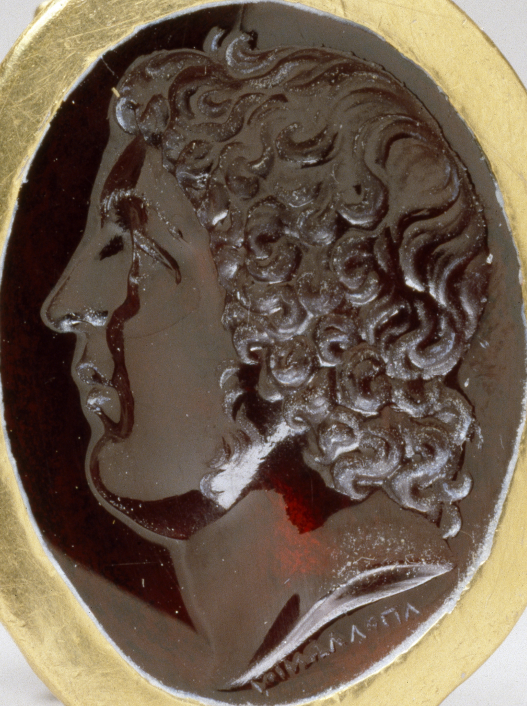
Intaglio portrait on a ring, possibly of Echedemos (circa 220 BC).

Echedemos (Greek: Ἐχέδημος; fl. 190 BC) was a Greek statesman of ancient Athens.

== Biography ==
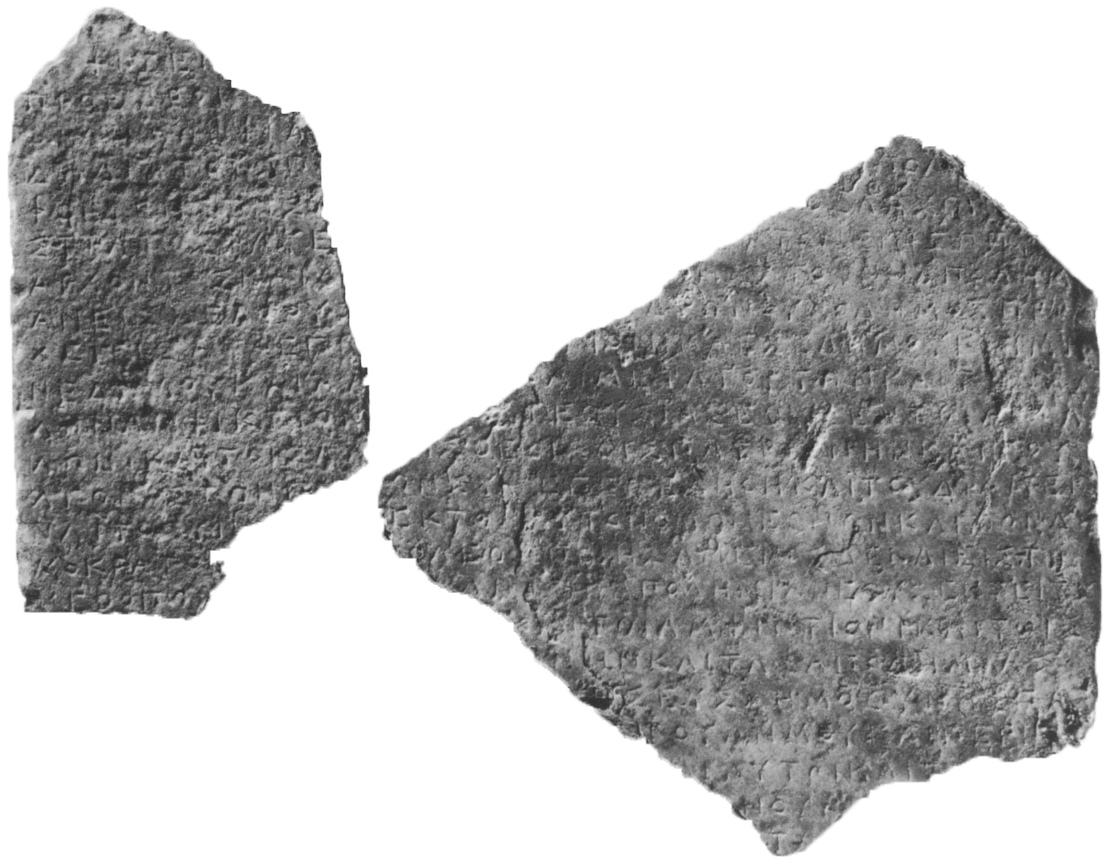
This fragmentary inscription from the Agora mentions the role of Echedemos in the reorganization of the Delphic Amphictyony.

Echedemos, son of Mnesitheos, Kydathenaieus, was a member of an important family, part of Athenian aristocracy.

He had at least two sons, Mnesitheos and Arketos, born circa 200 BC or slightly later.

In 190 BC, Echedemos was the head of the Athenian embassy that negotiated a truce between the Roman Republic and the Aetolian League.

In 185/184 BC he played a significant role in the reorganization of the Delphic Amphictyonic League.

In the year of 170/169 BC he is thought to have been the city's mint master.

== Embassy ==
Echedemos was the leader of the Athenian embassy (princeps legationis eorum) that mediated in a conflict between Aetolians and Romans in 190 BC.

These negotiations are reported in detail by the Greek historian Polybius (The Histories, XXI.4–5) and Roman historian Livy (The History of Rome, XXXVII.6–7).

== Amphictyonic League ==
In 185/184 BC Echedemos played a significant role in the reorganization of the Delphic Amphictyonic League.

This is attested by two inscriptions, one from Delphi and one from Athens.

== Epigrams ==
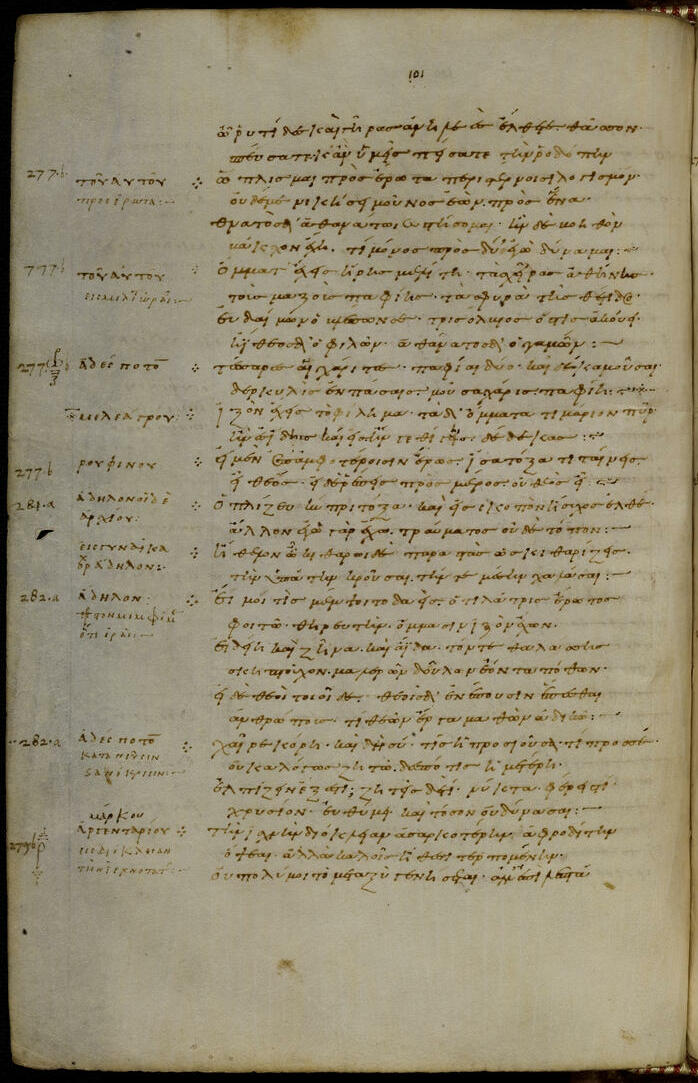
Palatine Anthology is a 10th-century manuscript containing a collection of Greek poems and epigrams from the 7th century BC on. Two of the epigrams probably refer to Echedemos.

Echedemos is probably the subject of two epigrams from the Palatine Anthology, by the Athenian poet Artemon.

In one poem, in which Echedemos is still a boy "in his prime", the poet is in love and steals a kiss from him:

As Echedemus was peeping out of his door on the sly, I slyly
kissed that charming boy who is just in his prime. Now I am
in dread, for he came to me in a dream, bearing a quiver,
and departed after giving me fighting cocks, but at one time
smiling, at another with no friendly look. But have I
touched a swarm of bees, and a nettle, and fire?

The poet's dread has been interpreted as referring to the high social status and power of Echedemos's family, who could cause considerable harm to the poet if his advances were judged too bold.

In the second poem, in which Echedemos has grown up, he is given a much more elaborate set of compliments:

Child of Leto, son of Zeus the great, who utterest oracles to
all men, thou art lord of the sea-girt height of Delos; but the
lord of the land of Cecrops is Echedemus, a second Attic
Phoebus, whom soft-haired Love lit with lovely bloom. And
his city Athens, once mistress of the sea and land, now has
made all Greece her slave by beauty.

Here, he is called "a second Attic Phoebus", Phoebus (literally "radiant") being a common epithet of Apollo. This comparison is certainly a reference to his beauty, but could also refer to a personal device he later stamped on Athenian coins. Echedemos is also called "the lord of the land of Cecrops", i.e. lord of Athens, indicating his high social standing and wealth. Two final lines, lamenting the former glory of Athens, indicate the date for the epigram in the beginning of the 2nd century BC when the ever-waning power of Athens allowed Romans to increase their influence in Greece and broader Hellenistic world (conflict with Aetolians being one example).

== Coinage ==
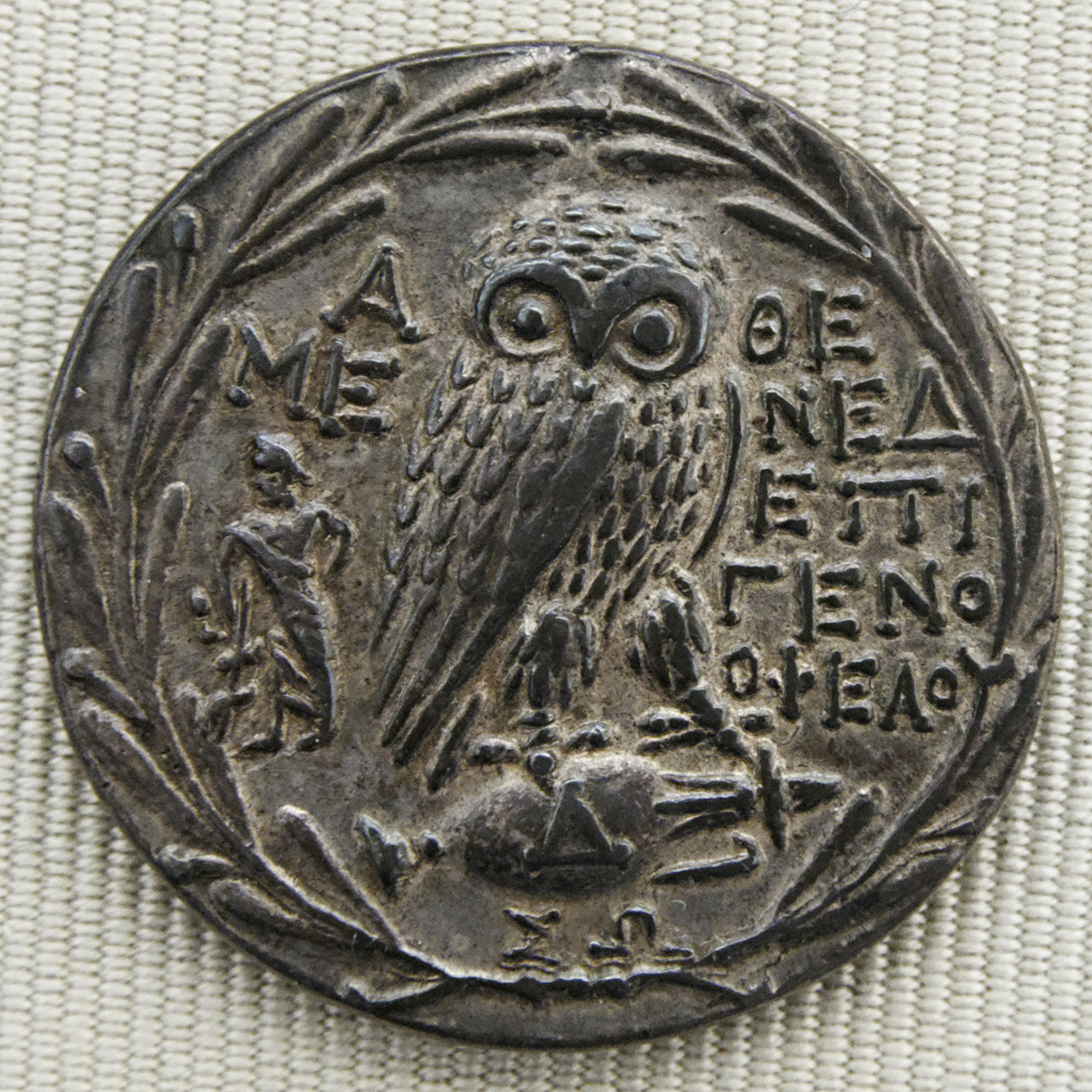
An example of a New Style tetradrachm, packed with additional inscriptions and symbols.

Some time in the second century BC Athens have established a new iconography of coinage, with obverse featuring a head of Athena and reverse showing an owl with additional images, symbols and inscriptions identifying, among other things, the people responsible for minting the coins.

Among these Athenian New Style coins there is a whole series bearing letters EXE on the reverse, possibly dating from 170–169 BC. These have been cited as a proof that Echedemos was the Athenian mint master at the time. The office of the mint master was given almost exclusively to members of the Athenian aristocracy, conferring the almost royal honour to place one's name and emblem on the city's coins.

Below the monogram, the coins bear a small device of a head or bust of Helios, with a crown of rays above seemingly rich curly voluminous hair. This emblem could be an allusion to the fair looks of Echedemos, paralleling the comparison to Apollo in an epigram by Artemon.

== Portrait ==
The portrait is signed by Apollonios.

A portrait on a ring from the Walters Art Museum in Baltimore was tentatively identified as that of Echemedos.

The portrait is a garnet intaglio of circa 220 BC. It is set into an original elaborate gold swivel ring. The work can be confidently dated as it is signed by engraver Apollonios (ΑΠΟΛΛΩΝΙΟ[Σ or Υ]), who also carved and signed a portrait of a very young Antiochus III (also called Antiochus the Great, ruled Seleucid Empire in 222–187 BC). Apollonios might have also been responsible for making coin dies for Antiochus III, as some of his coins bear monogram ΑΠΟ, although this is controversial. Several seal impressions — one of Antiochus III, one of Antiochus IV, and six of an unknown nobleman — excavated in Seleucia on the Tigris in modern Iraq, all unsigned, have been ascribed to Apollonios or his circle on stylistic grounds. Influence of his work has been deduced in coins of Antiochus III minted in Antiokheia. Apollonios was certainly an engraver of the first rank, but nothing else is known about him as his is a very common name. He has been hypothesized to be an Athenian who worked for some time in the Seleucid and possibly other Hellenistic courts.

Dating of the ring to around 220 BC agrees with what is known about Echedemos. His two sons were born circa 200 BC, so twenty years earlier he must have been fairly young.

Remarkably, two ancient partial impressions of this (or a very similar) ring have been excavated in Aetolian Kallipolis, near modern Lidoriki in Greece. They were found, among many other portraits, in the clay sealings from the "House of the Archives" that was burnt down, along with the whole city, shortly after the Battle of Pydna in 168 BC. They come from the correspondence between two prominent Aetolian generals (Agetas Lochagou and Lochagos Ageta) and important people of the time, including Roman general Scipio Africanus.

The ring was reportedly found at Panticapaeum (modern Kerch) in the Crimea. If this is indeed the case, there are several ways it could get from Athens to the Bosporus. Athens partly depended in its grain supply on the colonies of the Black Sea, and Echedemos could have sent the ring as a present to a king, a dignitary or even a merchant in the area during trade negotiations. Alternatively, it could travel back home with mercenaries of the northern Black Sea coast, who are known to have served all over Hellenistic world, even as far as Ptolemaic Egypt.

Identification is by no means concrete. Other suggestions include: an uncertain, perhaps Bosporan, king; a royal courtier, possibly Hermeias, the chief minister of Seleucus III; and, given the absence of any insignia, a private individual. Older identification as Bosporan king Asander (110–17 BC, ruled 44–17 BC) has since been disproven.
