= Guy Wetmore Carryl =

American humorist and poet (1873–1904)

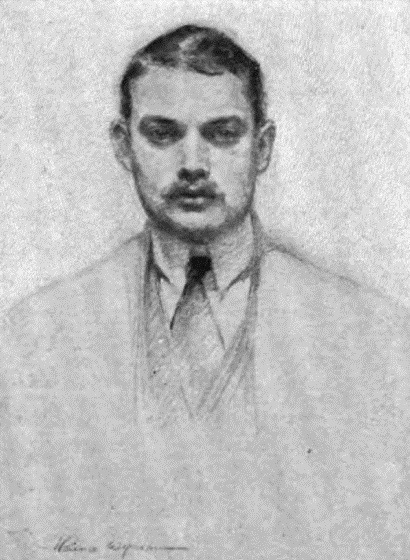
Guy Wetmore Carryl.

Guy Wetmore Carryl (4 March 1873 – 1 April 1904) was an American humorist and poet.

== Biography ==
Carryl was born in New York City, the first-born of writer Charles Edward Carryl and Mary R. Wetmore.

He had his first article published in The New York Times when he was 20 years old. In 1895, at the age of 22, Carryl graduated from Columbia University. During his college years he had written plays for amateur performances, including the very first Varsity Show. One of his professors was Harry Thurston Peck, who was scandalized by Carryl's famous statement, "It takes two bodies to make one seduction", which was somewhat risqué for those times.

After graduation, in 1896 he became a staff writer for Munsey's Magazine under Frank Munsey and he was later promoted to managing editor of the magazine. Later he went to work for Harper's Magazine and was sent to Paris. While in Paris he wrote for Life, Outing, Munsey's, and Collier's, as well as his own independent writings.

Some of Carryl's better-known works were his humorous poems that were parodies of Aesop's Fables, such as "The Sycophantic Fox and the Gullible Raven" and of Mother Goose nursery rhymes, such as "The Embarrassing Episode of Little Miss Muffet", poems which are still popular today. He also wrote a number of humorous parodies of Grimm's Fairy Tales, such as "How Little Red Riding Hood Came To Be Eaten" and "How Fair Cinderella Disposed of Her Shoe". His humorous poems usually ended with a pun on the words used in the moral of the story.

You are only absurd when you get in the curd,
But you’re rude when you get in the whey.
—from “The Embarrassing Episode of Little Miss Muffet”

Guy Carryl died in 1904 at age 31 at Roosevelt Hospital in New York City. His death was thought to be a result of illness contracted from exposure while fighting a fire at his house a month earlier.

== Works ==
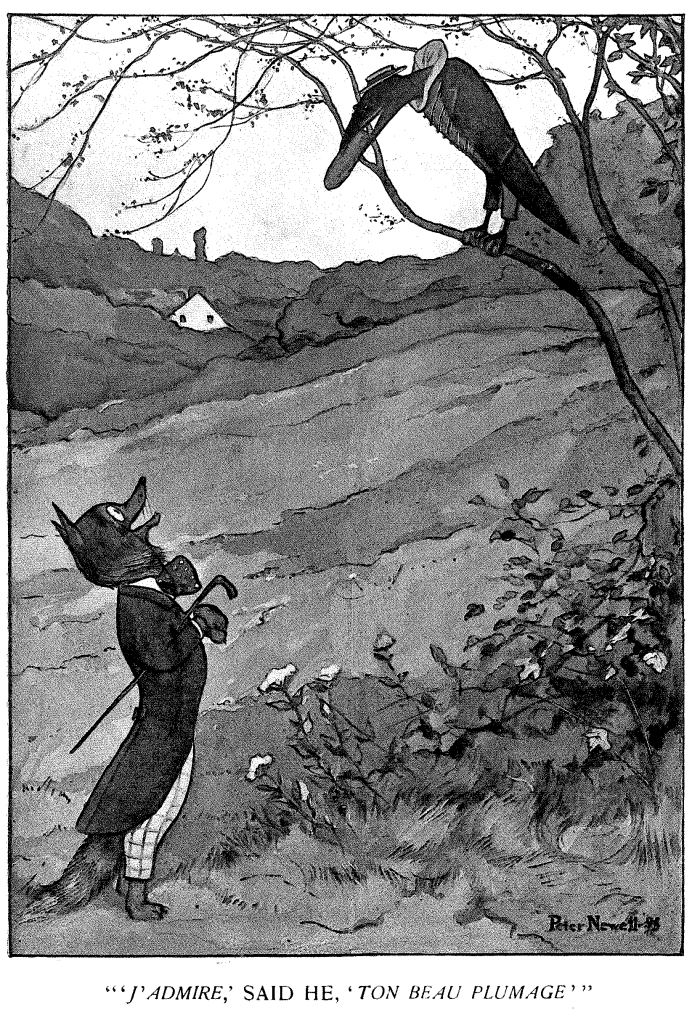
Illustration by Peter Newell from the collection Fables for the Frivolous, facing page 82 in the first edition. It illustrates Carryl's poem "The Sycophantic Fox and the Gullible Raven".

- The Buccaneer, Operetta in Two Acts (1895) – libretto by Carryl, music by Kenneth M. Murchison Jr., OCLC 20563281
- Fables for the Frivolous (with Apologies to La Fontaine) (1898), illustrated by Peter Newell – based on fables by Jean de La Fontaine
- Mother Goose for Grown-Ups (1900), illus. Newell and Gustave Verbeek
- Grimm Tales Made Gay (1902), illus. Albert Levering
- The Lieutenant Governor (1903)
- Zut and Other Parisians (1903)
- The Transgression of Andrew Vane (1904)
- Far from the Maddening Girls (1904) – posthumous
- The Garden of Years (1904) – posthumous

== Sources ==
- Columbia University biography
