= Menesaechmus =

Athenian inveterate enemy of Lycurgus

Menesaechmus (Ancient Greek: Μενέσαιχμος; lived during the 4th century BC), an Athenian and an inveterate enemy of the orator Lycurgus, by whom he was impeached on a charge of impiety and convicted. When Lycurgus felt his end drawing near (323 BC), he had himself brought into the council to give an account of his public conduct, and Menesaechmus was the only man who ventured to find fault with it. He continued his hostility to the sons of Lycurgus after their father's death, and so far succeeded in a prosecution against them, that they were delivered into the custody of the Eleven. They were released, however, on the remonstrance of Demosthenes.
