= Philinus of Athens =

Philinus (/fɪˈlaɪnəs/; Greek: Φιλῖνος; lived during the 4th century BC) was an Athenian orator, a contemporary of Demosthenes and Lycurgus. He is mentioned by Demosthenes in his oration against Meidias, who calls him the son of Nicostratus, and says that he was trierarch with him. Harpocration mentions three orations of Philinus. These are Against the statues of Sophocles and Euripides, which was against a proposition of Lycurgus that statues should be erected to those poets; Against Dorotheus, which was ascribed likewise to Hyperides; Judiciary litigation of the Croconidae against the Coeronidae, which was ascribed by others to Lycurgus. An ancient grammarian, quoted by Clement of Alexandria, says that Philinus borrowed from Demosthenes.
