= Aristogeiton (orator) =

4th-century BC Athenian orator

Aristogeiton (Ancient Greek: Ἀριστογείτων; lived 4th century BC) was an Athenian orator and adversary of Demosthenes and Dinarchus. His father, Scydimus, died in prison, as he was a debtor of the state and unable to pay: his son, Aristogeiton, who inherited the debt, was likewise imprisoned for some time. He is called a demagogue and a sycophant, and his eloquence is described as of a coarse and vehement character. His impudence drew upon him the surname of "the dog." He was often accused by Demosthenes and others, and defended himself in a number of orations which are lost. Among the extant speeches of Demosthenes there are two against Aristogeiton, (Note: The authorship of both speeches has been questioned; Douglas MacDowell considers Against Aristogeiton I to have been written by Demosthenes but Against Aristogeiton II to be pseudo-Demosthenic.) and among those of Dinarchus there is one. The Suda mentions seven orations of Aristogeiton, and an eighth against Phryne is mentioned by Athenaeus. Aristogeiton died in prison.
