= Fables for the Frivolous =

Book by Guy Wetmore Carryl

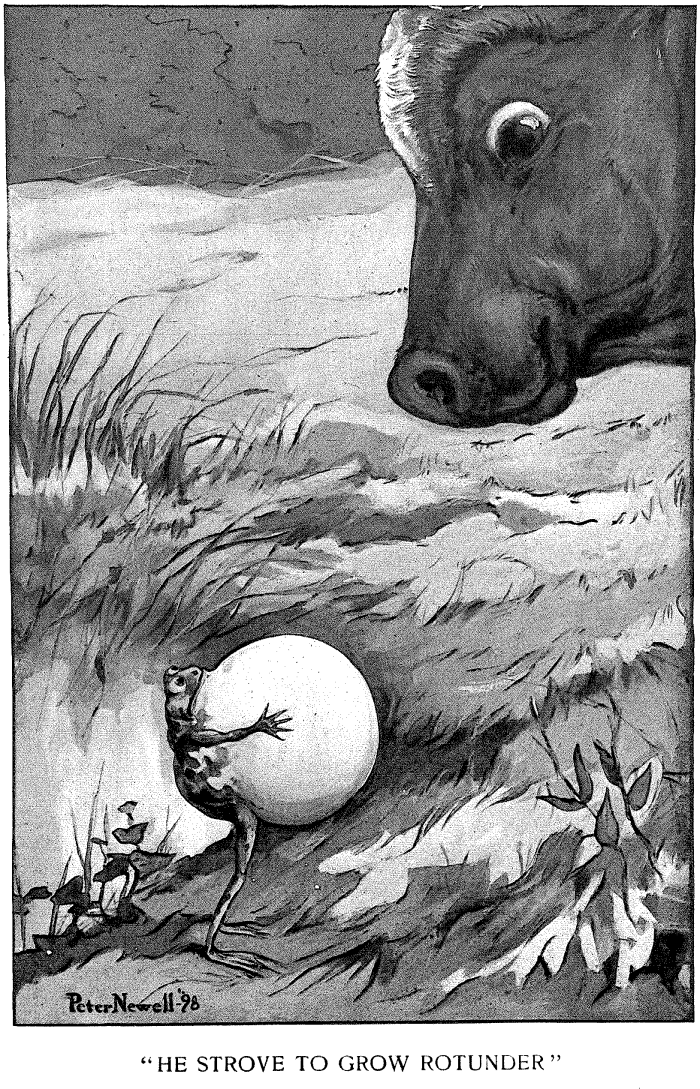
Illustration from Fables for the Frivolous by Guy Wetmore Carryl, with illustrations by Peter Newell.

Fables for the Frivolous, or Fables for the Frivolous (with Apologies to La Fontaine), is one of the earliest works by the American parodist Guy Wetmore Carryl. It was published by Harper & Brothers in 1898. These fables are adapted from Jean de La Fontaine's original writings. The Aesop-style fables are written in verse, and are light-hearted re-tellings of fables from two centuries before, each ending with a moral and a pun. Among the more celebrated of the fables are The Persevering Tortoise and the Pretentious Hare, The Arrogant Frog and the Superior Bull, and The Sycophantic Fox and the Gullible Raven.
