= Lycurgus of Athens =

4th century BC Greek politician and orator

Lycurgus Λυκοῦργος
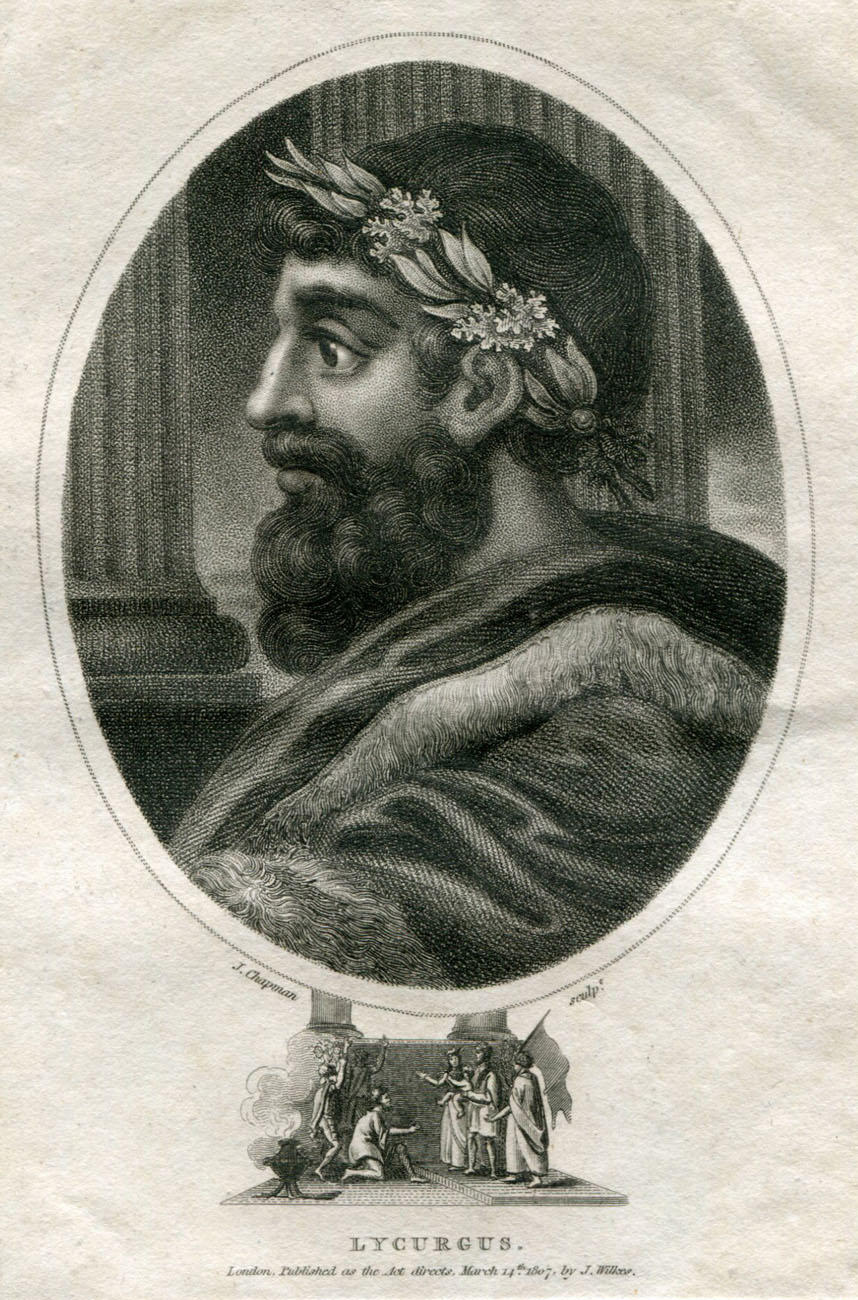
- Born: c. 390 BC
- Died: c. 325 BC (aged c. 65)
- Children: 3 sons

Lycurgus (/laɪˈkɜːrɡəs/; Ancient Greek: Λυκοῦργος Λυκόφρονος Βουτάδης, romanized: Lykourgos Lykophronos Boutadēs; c. 390 – c. 325 BC) was a statesman and logographer in Ancient Greece. In the aftermath of the Athenian defeat at the Battle of Chaeronea in 338 BC, he became the leading figure in Athenian politics, taking control of Athenian finances and pushing through a range of measures which drastically increased Athens' revenues. This money was used to expand the navy, improve the city's fortifications, develop the temples and religious ceremonies, and to build up a hefty reserve. He also encouraged the restoration of traditional values and prosecuted those who fell short of his expectations of civic behaviour. Because of his leading role, the period from 338 to 324 BC is often known in modern scholarship as the "Age of Lycurgus."

He was one of the ten Attic orators included in the "Alexandrian Canon" compiled by Aristophanes of Byzantium and Aristarchus of Samothrace in the third century BC. His only surviving speech is the Against Leocrates.

He should not be confused with the quasi-mythological Spartan lawgiver of the same name.

== Life ==
Lycurgus was born before 384 BC, probably around 390 BC. His father was Lycophron, son of Lycurgus, who belonged to the noble family of the Eteobutadae. His mother's name is partially preserved on a funerary inscription as -ne, daughter of -kleos. He belonged to the deme Butadae, which was in the tribe of Oeneis.

In his early life, he devoted himself to the study of philosophy in the school of Plato, but afterwards became one of the disciples of Isocrates, and entered upon public life at a comparatively early age. He was appointed manager of the public revenue for a four-year term from 336 to 332 BC and proved highly successful. Because multiple terms in this role were banned, at the end of his tenure he picked a series of substitutes who held the office on his behalf and followed his direction for the next two terms, from 332 BC to down to 324 BC. The conscientiousness with which he discharged the duties of this office enabled him to raise the public revenue to the sum of 1,200 talents.

In 335 BC, after Thebes revolted against Alexander the Great and was sacked, Alexander demanded that the Athenians hand over Lycurgus, Demosthenes, and other opponents of the Macedonians, but the Athenians refused.

He was further entrusted with the superintendence (φυλακή) of the city and the keeping of public discipline; and the severity with which he watched over the conduct of the citizens became almost proverbial.

His integrity was so great, that even private persons deposited with him large sums of money, which they wished to be kept in safety. He was also the author of several legislative enactments, of which he enforced the strictest observance. One of his laws forbade women to ride in chariots at the celebration of the mysteries; and when his own wife transgressed this law, she was fined; another ordained that bronze statues should be erected to Aeschylus, Sophocles, and Euripides, that copies of their tragedies should be made and preserved in the public archives.

The Lives of the Ten Orators erroneously ascribed to Plutarch are full of anecdotes and characteristic features of Lycurgus. He often appeared as a successful accuser in the Athenian courts, but he himself was as often accused by others, though he always, and even in the last days of his life, succeeded in silencing his enemies.

Thus, we know that he was attacked by Philinus, Dinarchus, Aristogeiton, Menesaechmus, and others.

He died while holding the office of director (ἐπιστάτης) of the Theatre of Dionysus, in 325/4 BC, shortly before the Harpalus affair.

At his death, he left behind three sons who were severely persecuted by Menesaechmus and Thrasycles, but were defended by Hypereides and Democles.

In 307/6 BC, the orator Stratocles ordered a bronze statue to be erected to him in the Ceramicus, and that he and his eldest son should be entertained in the prytaneum at the public expense.

=== Family ===
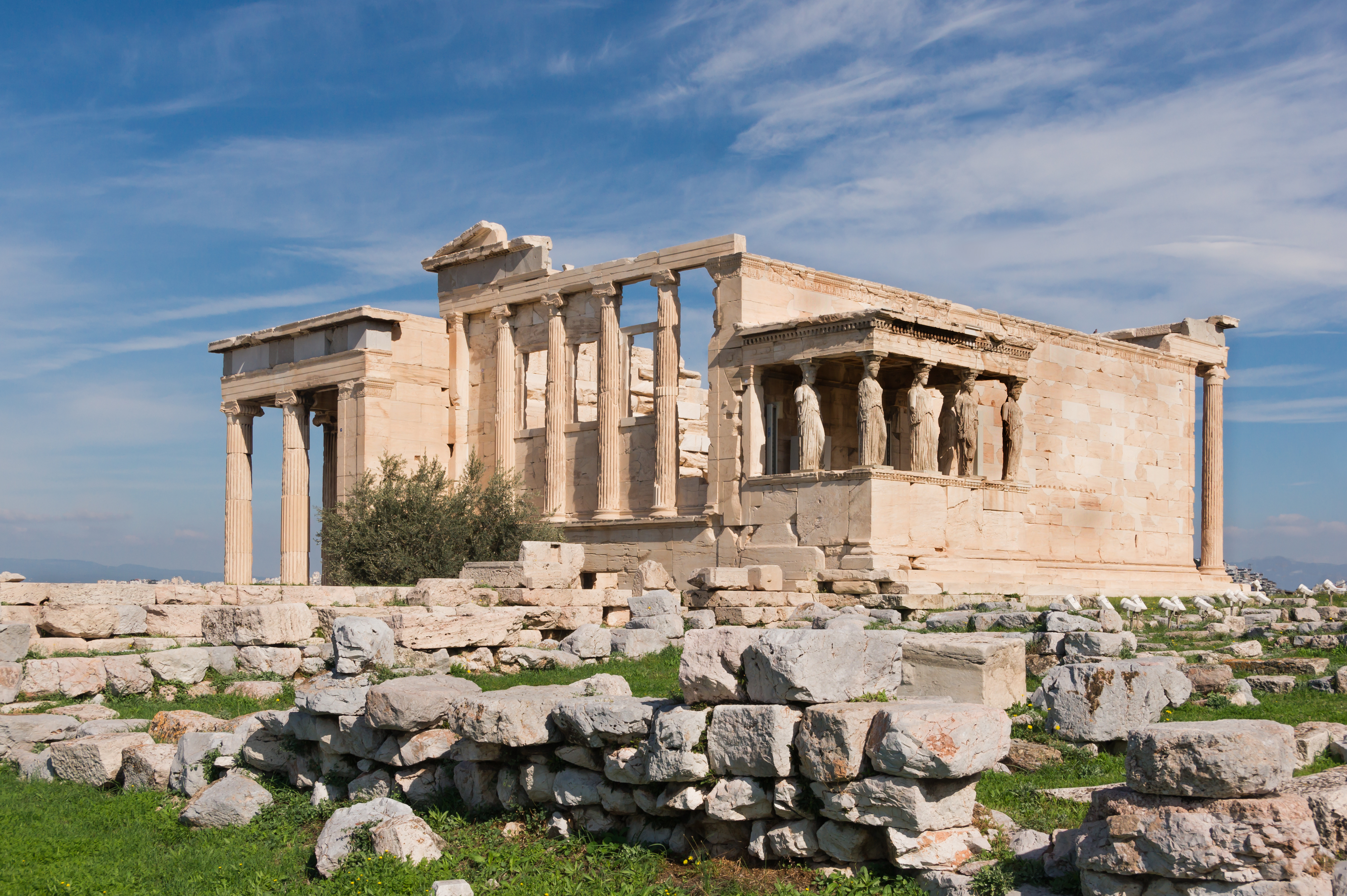
The Erechtheum, seat of the cult of Poseidon Erechtheus.

Lycurgus claimed descent from the mythical Athenian king Erechtheus. He was a member of the branch of the Eteoboutadae clan (genos) that supplied the priests of Poseidon Erechtheus. He is probably ultimately descended from Lycurgus, son of Aristolaides who led the Pedieis ("people of the plains") in the conflicts leading up to the establishment of Pisistratus' tyranny. His grandfather, also called Lycurgus, was priest of Poseidon in the late fifth-century, supported the introduction of the cult of Isis in Athens and was murdered by the Thirty Tyrants in 404 BC. Nothing about his father's life is recorded.

Lycurgus married Callisto, daughter of Habron from the deme of Bate, who belonged to a wealthy family, part of the other branch of the Eteoboutiad clan, which provided the priestess of Athena Polias. Her brother, Callias, was treasurer of the military fund in 338/7 BC.

Lycurgus had three sons:

- Lycophron, whose descendants are attested in important offices and priesthoods down to at least the end of the first century BC.
- Habron (ca. 350-305 BC), who succeeded his father as priest of Poseidon, and, after the fall of Demetrius of Phalerum and the restoration of democracy, he served as head of administration in 307/6 and treasurer of the military fund in 306/5 BC. He died childless.
- Lycurgus, who also died childless.

The funerary mound of the family in the Kerameikos was discovered in the 1980s.

== Role in Athenian civic life ==
Lycurgus shaped Athenian politics after the defeat at Chaeronea. After losing the battle, many citizens were uncertain about the directions Athens was headed. Many scholars described this period as a moment when Athens needed stability. Lycurgus helped hold the city with a clear structure of order, and discipline.

"Against Leocrates" showed his real political vision. Lycurgus often uses the word, "patris," which means "fatherland". He treat loyalty to the fatherland as the centre of public life. He framed loyalty and service to Athens as the core duty that every Athenian should partake in, and pushed the idea that the state is a community that required protection. He stated that Leocrates' actions towards Athens was an act of betrayal and used this specific trial to display proper civic behavior as an example for Athenians.

Most Athenian prosecutors relied on anger, and spoke as if they were the affected party. Lycurgus was against this idea, and believed that personal emotions should be removed from prosecution. He also stated he had no private conflict with the defendant and presented himself as a public servant of the state. This practice was unusual in Athenian society. He shifted the role of prosecutor from personal vendetta to public duty to the city, by using speeches and the law as a tool to his advantage.

He was driven by the principles of virtue and truth, when he reframed punishment as education. He spoke about reform while avoided using the language of revenge since his goal was to redefine civic duty and to reshape public expectations of what a good Athenian citizen should appear like.

Eight out of ten orators preferred the language of taking justice from the wrongdoer. Only Hyperides and Lycurgus preferred the word 'Κολάζειν', meaning 'to punish'.

== Tax reform ==
Lycurgus was given control over Athenian finances for 12 years. He used the taxes he collected from the elites to make Athens appear stable again by funding public projects. Many scholars argue that he was trying to prove democracy can fund itself better than monarchies.

The Athenian tax system was extremely corrupt. The wealthy avoided paying taxes and hid their property to avoid collection. Tax officials made deals with the elites or turned a blind eye. This inconsistency led Lycurgus to enforce tax collections and ensure wealthy Athenians were contributing to society and rebuilding Athens. He created a strong audit system and increased oversight of tax records.

Lycurgus pushed for stronger and more consistent documentation, tracking what was owed versus what was being collected. This method gave Athens a good stream of income, which increased public trust and made Athenians believe in the state again.

== Civic projects ==
When Lycurgus had control over funding, he spent many years supervising public projects for Athens, including:

- Repairing the Theatre of Dionysus
- Early construction of the Panathenaic Stadium
- Repairing Athens' water supply
- Commissioning bronze statues of Aeschylus, Sophocles, and Euripides

== Writings ==
The Lives of the Ten Orators mentions that fifteen orations of Lycurgus were extant when it was written, probably in the late first century BC, but we know the titles of at least twenty. All of these are lost, or preserved only in fragments, except for Against Leocrates, which was delivered in 330 BC.

As a result, our knowledge of his style as an orator is very incomplete. Dionysius and other ancient critics draw particular attention to the ethical tendency of his orations, but they censure the harshness of his metaphors, the inaccuracy in the arrangement of his subject, and his frequent digressions. His style was said to be noble and grand, but neither elegant nor pleasing. His works seem to have been commented upon by Didymus of Alexandria.

Theon mentions two declamations, Encomium of Helen and Deploration of Eurybatus, as the works of Lycurgus; but this Lycurgus, if the name be correct, must be a different personage from the Attic orator.

Against Leocrates was first printed by Aldus Manutius in his edition of the Attic orators in 1508.

== Editions ==
- Cooper, Craig; Harris, Edward M.; Worthington, Ian, eds. (2010). Dinarchus, Hyperides, and Lycurgus. University of Texas Press. ISBN 978-0-292-77407-0.
- Lycurgus (2019). Rosiman, Joseph (ed.). Against Leocrates (First ed.). Oxford, United Kingdom: Oxford University Press. ISBN 978-0-19-883017-7.

== Bibliography ==
- Allen, Danielle S. (2000). "Changing the Authoritative Voice: Lycurgus' "Against Leocrates"". Classical Antiquity. 19 (1): 5–33. doi:10.2307/25011110. ISSN 0278-6656. JSTOR 25011110.
- Davies, John K. (1971). Athenian propertied families, 600-300 B.C. Oxford: Clarendon Press. pp. 348–353. ISBN 978-0-19-814273-7.
- Habicht, Christian (1997). Athens from Alexander to Antony. Cambridge, Mass.: Harvard University Press. ISBN 0-674-05111-4.
- Humphreys, S. C. (2004). "Lycurgus of Boutadai: an Athenian aristocrat". The strangeness of gods: historical perspectives on the interpretation of Athenian religion. Oxford: Oxford University Press. pp. 77–129. ISBN 978-0-19-926923-5.
- Lambert, Stephen D. (2015). "Connecting with the Past in Lykourgan Athens: An epigraphic perspective". In Foxhall, Lin; Gehrke, Hans-Joachim; Luraghi, Nino (eds.). Intentional History: Spinning Time in Ancient Greece. Stuttgart: Franz Steiner Verlag. pp. 225–238. ISBN 978-3-515-11288-8.
- Lambert, Stephen D. (2015). "The Inscribed Version of the Decree Honouring Lykourgos of Boutadai (IG II2 457 and 3207)". AIO Papers. 6 (1–12).
- Lambert, Stephen D. (2019). "The Priesthoods of the Eteoboutadai". In Archibald, Zosia; Haywood, J. (eds.). The power of individual and community in Ancient Athens and beyond: essays in honour of John K. Davies. Swansea: Classical Press of Wales. p. 163. ISBN 978-1-910589-73-1.
- Matthaiou, Angelos (1987). "Ἠρίον Λυκούργου Λυκόφρονος Βουτάδου". ΗΟΡΟΣ. 5: 31–44.
- Mikalson, Jon D. (1998). Religion in Hellenistic Athens. Berkeley: University of California Press. ISBN 978-0-520-21023-3.
