= Works of Demosthenes =

Intellectually aggressive logography

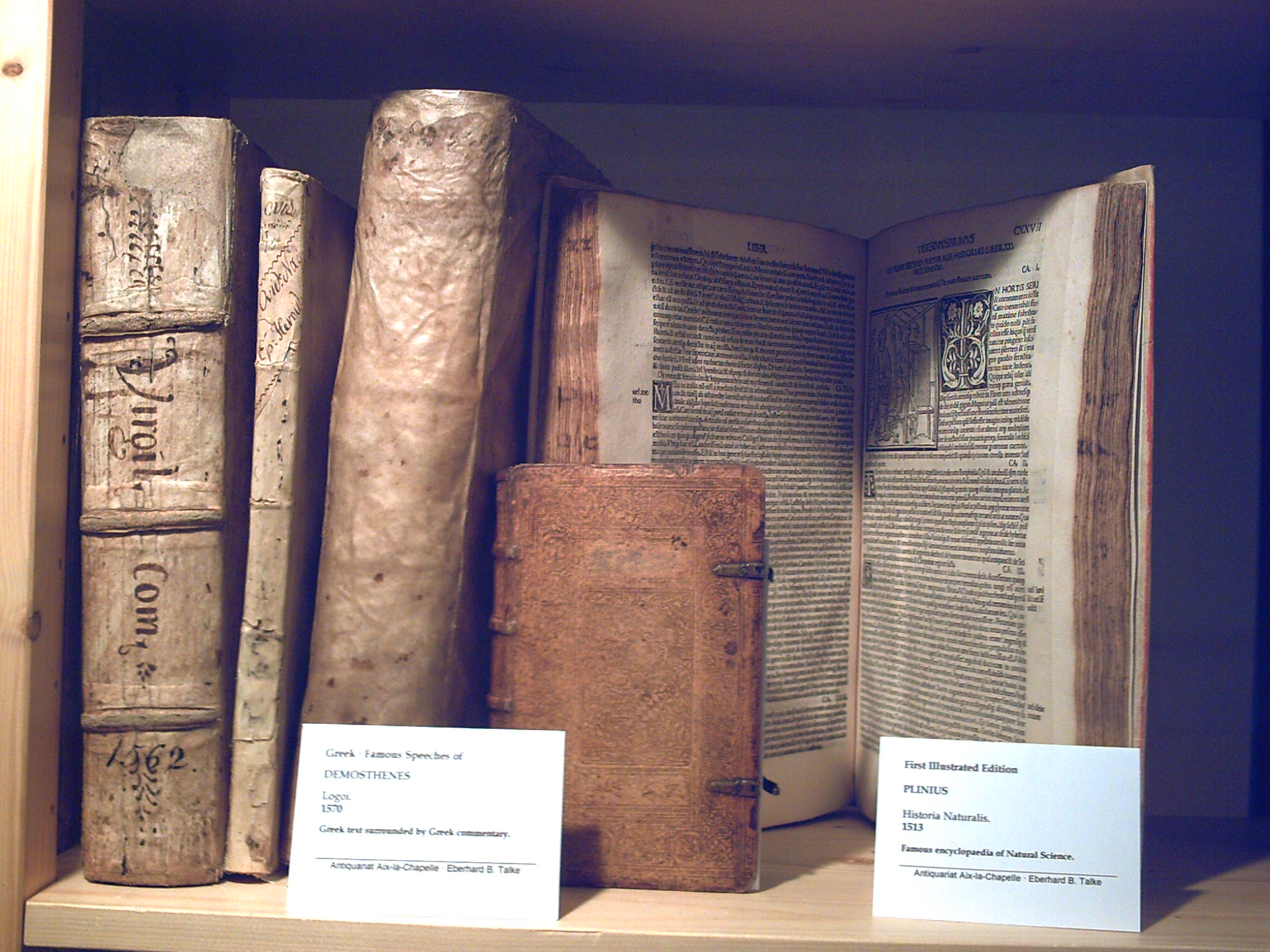
The Logoi, the famous speeches by Demosthenes, in a 1570 edition, in Greek surrounded by Greek commentary, amongst other works of the period.

Demosthenes (Greek: Δημοσθένης; 384–322 BC) was a prominent Greek statesman and orator of ancient Athens. His orations constitute the last significant expression of Athenian intellectual prowess and provide a thorough insight into the politics and culture of ancient Greece. The Alexandrian Canon compiled by Aristophanes of Byzantium and Aristarchus of Samothrace recognized Demosthenes as one of the ten greatest Attic orators and logographers. Cicero acclaimed him as "the perfect orator" and the one who "has pre-eminence over all others" ("inter omnes unus excellat"), while Quintilian extolled him as lex orandi ("the standard of oratory").

== Manuscript tradition ==
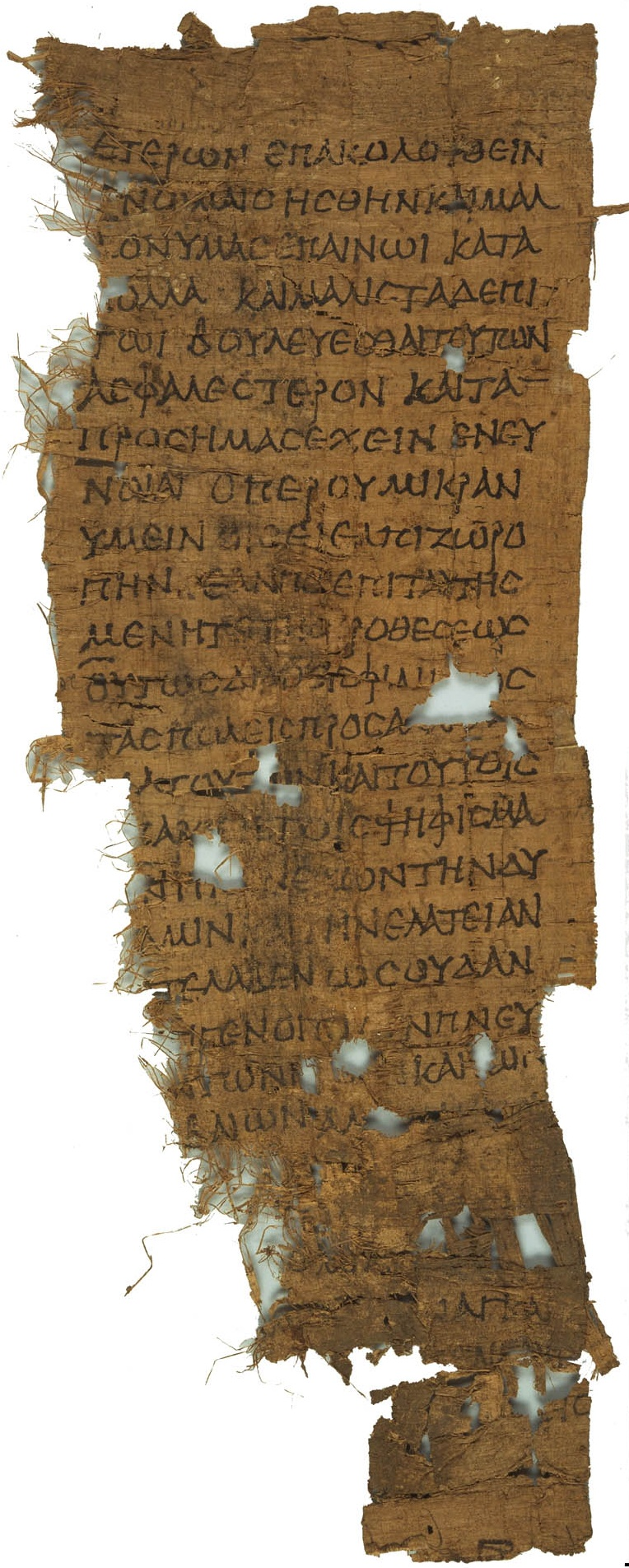
Demosthenes, De Corona 167–169. P. Oxy. 1377, 1st century BCE

Demosthenes must have written down and put into circulation most of his orations. In the next generation after his death, texts of his speeches survived in at least two places: Athens and the Library of Alexandria (early-mid third century BC). During this period, Callimachus was responsible for producing the catalogue of all the volumes contained in the Library. Demosthenes' speeches were incorporated into the body of classical Greek literature that was preserved, catalogued and studied by scholars of the Hellenistic period. From then until the fourth century AD copies of his orations multiplied at a time when Demosthenes was deemed the most important writer in the rhetorical world and every serious student of rhetoric needed access to his writings. Texts of his speeches were in a relatively good position to survive the tense period from the sixth until the ninth century AD.

Scholars have recorded 258 Byzantine manuscripts of Demosthenes' speeches and 21 of extracts. Modern editions of these speeches are based on four of these manuscripts:

- The tenth-century Venetus Marcianus 416 (called F), including the sixty-one orations, which finally survived. The Aldine edition was based on three manuscripts of the same family as F, though not on F itself; so the customary order of the speeches is of this family.
- The tenth- or eleventh-century Monacensis Augustanus 485 (called A), which includes fifty-four speeches. Those omitted are 12, 45, 46, 52, 60 and 61.
- The tenth- or eleventh-century Parisinus 2935 (called Y), which includes twenty-nine speeches (1-21, 23, 22, 24-26, 59, 61 and 60 in that order).
- The tenth- or eleventh-century Parisinus 2934 (called S) considered to be the most reliable by many scholars. It omits item 12 (Philip's Letter) but includes the 60 speeches. A facsimile of the codex was published in 1892-93, in Paris, by H. Omont.
- Papyrus Oxyrhynchus 25, a third-century manuscript of De Corona;
- Papyrus Oxyrhynchus 26, a second-century manuscript of Prooimia Demegorica;
- Papyrus Oxyrhynchus 230, a second-century manuscript of De Corona;
- Papyrus Oxyrhynchus 231, a second- or third-century manuscript of De Corona.

== Authorship ==
The authorship of many of the works attributed to Demosthenes have been disputed. Arnold Schaefer, for instance, accepted only 29 of Demosthenes' speeches as genuine.

Some works are almost universally rejected. Most of the speeches given by Apollodoros, for instance, are widely considered to have been written by Apollodoros himself, though the first speech "Against Stephanos" has been considered authentic by many scholars. Of these, at least two, "Against Callipus" and "Against Nicostratus", must have been composed by someone other than Demosthenes, as he would have been too young at the time they were composed. Similarly, "virtually everyone" believes that "On the Halonessus" was written and delivered by Hegesippus rather than Demosthenes.

At the other end of the spectrum, some works which have been doubted are now generally considered to be authentic. The third speech "Against Aphobos", for instance, is now generally accepted to be authentic. Still other speeches have been generally considered authentic but have had some sections considered to be later additions. The "Third Philippic", for instance, contains text which does not appear in all of the manuscript traditions; it has been suggested that this was a later addition by another writer.

Finally, one of the works which was transmitted as part of the Demosthenic corpus makes no claim to have been written by Demosthenes. This is number 12, the "Epistle of Philip", which claims to be the letter from Philip of Macedon to the people of Athens to which Demosthenes 11, the "Reply to Philip", is a response. Douglas MacDowell believes that this is authentically Philip's letter.

== Prologues ==
Fifty-six passages bearing the collective title prooimia (or prooimia dēmēgorika) — (demegoric) prologues or preambles, also Exordia — are extant. These were openings of Demosthenes' speeches, collected by Callimachus for the Library of Alexandria, and preserved in several of the manuscripts that contain Demosthenes' speeches. The passages vary somewhat in length, though most are about one page or slightly less. The majority of the prologues bear no relation to Demosthenes' other extant speeches (only five correspond closely to the beginnings of five of Demosthenes' Assembly speeches), but we have only seventeen public orations by him. The topics that arise vary considerably, and there is no apparent order. The prologues give us insights into the Athenians' attitude to their democracy as well as to the reactions and even expectations of an audience at an Assembly. Callimachus believed that Demosthenes composed them, as also did Julius Pollux and Stobaeus. Modern scholars are divided: Some of them reject them, while others believe they were genuine.

== Letters ==
Six letters are written under Demosthenes' name, but their authorship has been fiercely debated. J.A. Goldstein regards Demosthenes's letters as authentic apologetic letters that were addressed to the Athenian assembly and asserts that "whether the letters had a spurious origin as propaganda or as rhetorical fictions, the aim of the author would be to present a defense of Demosthenes' career, a simulated self-defense". Ostensibly, the first four were written by Demosthenes during his exile in 323 BC, the fifth in his youth, and the sixth during the Lamian War.
