= Papyrus Oxyrhynchus 236 =

Ancient Greek manuscript

Papyrus Oxyrhynchus 236 (P. Oxy. 236 or P. Oxy. II 236) consists of three fragments concerning Ptolemy Neos Dionysus (Auletes), written in Greek. They were discovered in Oxyrhynchus. The manuscript was written on papyrus in the form of a sheet. It is dated to the 1st century BC. Currently it is housed in The British Library.

== Description ==
This is one of the earliest papyri found at Oxyrhynchus. It describes the form of the royal titles during the reign of Ptolemy Auletes, whose name in 1899 had not been found on a papyrus before. The first of the three fragments is written in an almost uncial hand, while the other two are more cursive. The measurements of the fragments are 43 by 62 mm, 42 by 71 mm, and 52 by 46 mm respectively.

It was discovered by Grenfell and Hunt in 1897 in Oxyrhynchus. The text was published by Grenfell and Hunt in 1899.

== See also ==
- Oxyrhynchus Papyri
- Papyrus Oxyrhynchus 235
- Papyrus Oxyrhynchus 237
