= Papyrus Oxyrhynchus 232 =

Greek papyrus fragment

Papyrus Oxyrhynchus 232 (P. Oxy. 232 or P. Oxy. II 232; also known as P.Lond.Lit. 128 and Pap.Flor. VIII 35; TM 59591; LDAB 693) is a fragment of Contra Timocratem by Demosthenes, written in Greek. It was discovered in Oxyrhynchus. The manuscript was written on papyrus in the form of a roll. It is dated to the second or third century. Currently it is housed in the British Library (Department of Manuscripts, 787) in London.

== Description ==
The document was written by an unknown copyist. It contains the text of Contra Timocratem (53–54, 56–58) by Demosthenes. The measurements of the fragment are 130 by 140 mm. The text is written in a medium-sized, sloping uncial hand. Palaeographically it resembles the Oxyrhynchus Homer. There are neither rough breathings nor accents, and only one stop occurs.

It was discovered by Grenfell and Hunt in 1897 in Oxyrhynchus. The text was published by Grenfell and Hunt in 1899.

The verso (back) of the roll was reused sometime afterwards to compose what appears to be a letter, dated to the 3rd century CE.

== See also ==
- Oxyrhynchus Papyri
- Papyrus Oxyrhynchus 231
- Papyrus Oxyrhynchus 233
- Image of the manuscript online at the British Library.
