= Papyrus Oxyrhynchus 29 =

Fragment of the second book of the Elements by Euclid

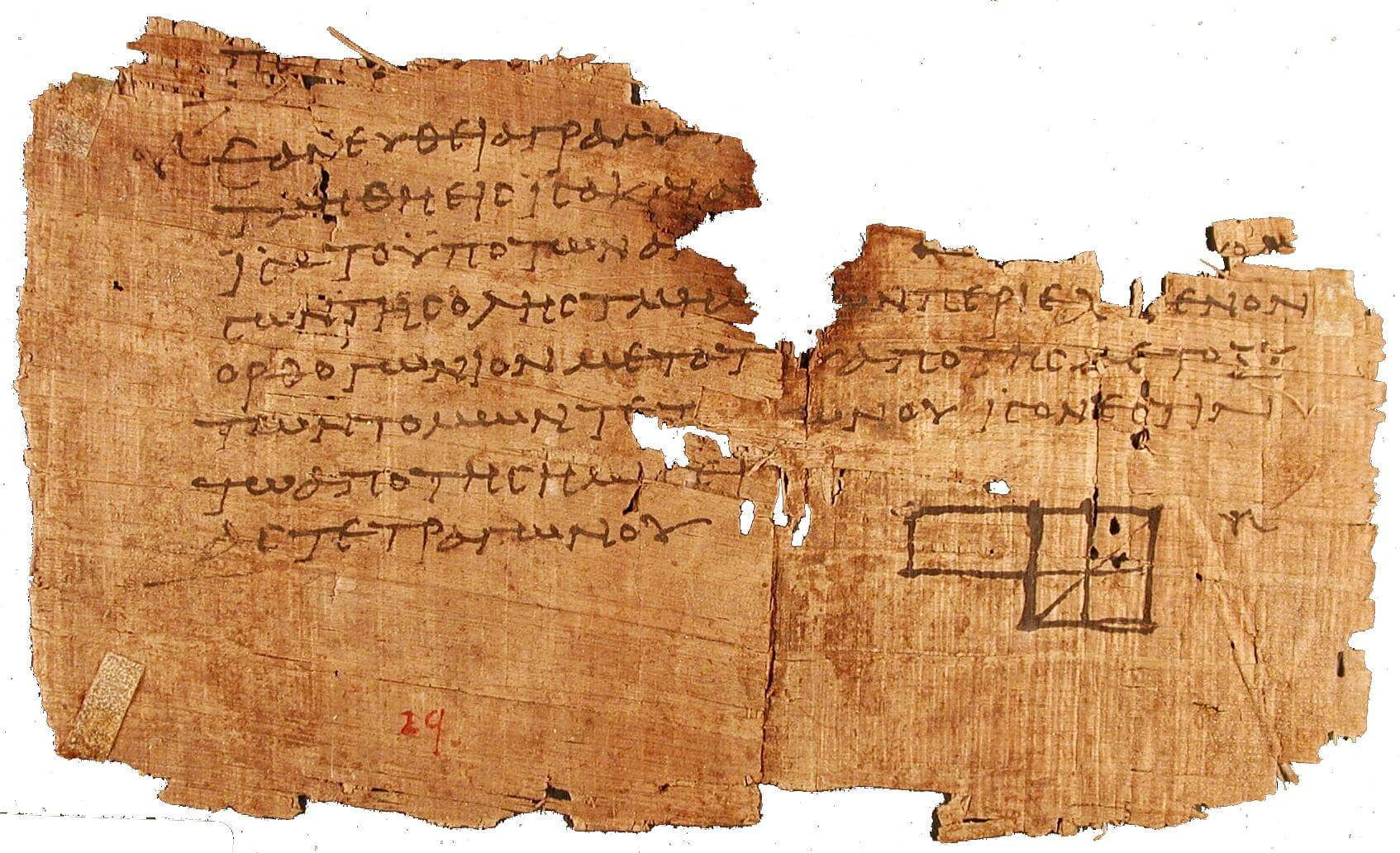
Papyrus Oxyrhynchus 29

Papyrus Oxyrhynchus 29 (P. Oxy. 29) is a fragment of the second book of the Elements of Euclid in Greek. It was discovered by Grenfell and Hunt in 1897 in Oxyrhynchus. The fragment was originally dated to the end of the third century or the beginning of the fourth century, although more recent scholarship suggests a date of 75–125 CE. It is housed in the library of the University of Pennsylvania (in a University Museum, E 2748). The text was published by Grenfell and Hunt in 1898.

== Description ==
The manuscript was written on papyrus in sloping irregular uncial letters, with no iota adscript, and with slight spelling errors. The fragment measures 85 by 152 mm.

The fragment provides a statement of the 5th proposition of Book 2 of the Elements, together with an unlabelled diagram, and a tiny part of the preceding proposition. No part of the proof is provided. In translation, the statement is "If a straight line be cut into equal and unequal segments, the rectangle contained by the unequal segments of the whole together with the square on the straight line between the points of section is equal to the square on the half."

== See also ==
- Oxyrhynchus Papyri
- Papyrus Oxyrhynchus 28
- Papyrus Oxyrhynchus 30
