= Papyrus Oxyrhynchus 27 =

Greek papyrus fragment

Papyrus Oxyrhynchus 27 (P. Oxy. 27) is a fragment of Antidosis (83, 87) by Isocrates, written in Greek. It was discovered by Bernard Pyne Grenfell and Arthur Surridge Hunt in 1897 in Oxyrhynchus. The fragment is dated to the first or second century. It is housed in the University of Chicago (Haskell Oriental Institute). The text was published by Grenfell and Hunt in 1898.

The manuscript was written on papyrus in the form of a roll. The measurements of the fragment are 52 by 127 millimetres (2.0 by 5.0 in). The text is written in a small upright uncial hand. Grenfell and Hunt collated the text of the manuscript on the basis of the Benseler-Blass edition (1885).

== See also ==
- Oxyrhynchus Papyri – Manuscript fragments from 32BC–640AD found in an Egyptian rubbish dump
- Papyrus Oxyrhynchus 26 – Greek papyrus fragment
- Papyrus Oxyrhynchus 28 – Greek papyrus fragment
