= Papyrus Oxyrhynchus 235 =

Greek papyrus fragment

Papyrus Oxyrhynchus 235 (P. Oxy. 235 or P. Oxy. II 235) is a horoscope written in Greek. It was discovered in Oxyrhynchus. The manuscript was written on papyrus in the form of a sheet. It is dated to the 1st century. Currently it is housed in the Cambridge University Library.

== Description ==
The papyrus contains the horoscope of a person born about 10 p.m. on September 28, between 15 and 37 AD. The measurements of the fragment are 210 by 135 mm. The handwriting is a good-sized semi-uncial hand. At the time of discovery, this was one of five known horoscopes written on papyrus, though many more have been discovered since.

It was discovered by Grenfell and Hunt in 1897 in Oxyrhynchus. The text was published by Grenfell and Hunt in 1899.

== Contents ==
The horoscope gives the sign of the zodiac occupied by the Sun, Moon, Saturn, Jupiter, Mars, Venus, Mercury, and the four chief points in the heavens. A feature which distinguishes this horoscope from the other four known is a diagram below the text illustrating the position of the heavens at the time of the birth of the subject. The diagram consists of a circle divided by two diameters intersecting at right angles and connecting the zenith with the nadir, and the point in the heavens which was rising with that which was setting. The signs of the zodiac are marked inside the circle, the Sun, Moon, planets, and points of the heavens outside it, in a line with the sign to which they belong.

Beginning at the top appear Aquarius at the zenith, Pisces, Aries, Taurus, containing the moon and the point which was rising, Gemini, Cancer, Leo at the nadir, Virgo, Libra, containing the Sun and Mars, Scorpio, containing Mercury, Venus, and the point which was setting, Sagittarius, containing Saturn and Jupiter, and Capricorn. There is some error in the astronomical calculations recorded, because the position of the planets indicated could not have occurred during the span of time in which the horoscope was made.

== See also ==
- Oxyrhynchus Papyri
- Papyrus Oxyrhynchus 234
- Papyrus Oxyrhynchus 236
