= Papyrus Oxyrhynchus 28 =

Greek papyrus fragment

Papyrus Oxyrhynchus 28 (P. Oxy. 28) is a manuscript consisting of fragments of the third book of Hellenica (chapter 1) by Xenophon, written in Greek. It was discovered by Grenfell and Hunt in 1897 in Oxyrhynchus. The fragment is dated to the second century. It is housed in the library of the University of St Andrews. The text was published by Grenfell and Hunt in 1898.

The manuscript was written on papyrus in the form of a roll. Three consecutive columns have survived. The measurements of a single column are 122 by 125 mm. The text is written in a nearly upright square uncial hand. In the upper margin are some semi-cursive scholia, written in a more formal hand than the text. Iota adscript is commonly written. Grenfell and Hunt collated the text of the manuscript on the basis of Keller's edition (1890).

== See also ==
- Oxyrhynchus Papyri
- Papyrus Oxyrhynchus 27
- Papyrus Oxyrhynchus 29
