= Papyrus Oxyrhynchus 22 =

Greek papyrus fragment

Papyrus Oxyrhynchus 22 (P. Oxy. 22) contains fragments of the Oedipus Tyrannus by Sophocles, written in Greek. It was discovered by Grenfell and Hunt in 1897 in Oxyrhynchus. The fragment is dated to the fifth century. It is housed in the British Library (Department of Manuscripts). The text was published by Grenfell and Hunt in 1898.

The manuscript was written on papyrus in the form of a codex. The measurements of the fragment are 80 by 93 mm. The text is written in a small round upright formal uncial hand. There are rough breathings and accents.

== See also ==
- Oxyrhynchus Papyri
- Papyrus Oxyrhynchus 21
- Papyrus Oxyrhynchus 23
