= Papyrus Oxyrhynchus 24 =

Greek papyrus fragment

Papyrus Oxyrhynchus 24 (P. Oxy. 24) is a fragment of Chapter X of Plato's Republic, written in Greek. It was discovered by Grenfell and Hunt in 1897 in Oxyrhynchus. The fragment is dated to the third century. It is housed in the Beinecke Rare Book and Manuscript Library at Yale University. The text was published by Grenfell and Hunt in 1898.

The manuscript was written on papyrus in the form of a roll. The measurements of the fragment are 46 by 74 mm. The fragment contains 10 lines of text. The text is written in a medium-sized sloping uncial hand. The only textual variants are spellings ουτω for ουτως and ενγεγονοτα for εγγεγονοτα.

== See also ==
- Oxyrhynchus Papyri
- Papyrus Oxyrhynchus 23
- Papyrus Oxyrhynchus 25
