= Papyrus Oxyrhynchus 233 =

Greek papyrus fragment

Papyrus Oxyrhynchus 233 (P. Oxy. 233 or P. Oxy. II 233) is a fragment of Demosthenes' speech Against Timocrates, written in Greek. It was discovered in Oxyrhynchus. The manuscript was written on papyrus in the form of a roll. It is dated to the third century. Currently it is housed in the museum of the University of Pennsylvania (E 2757) in Philadelphia.

== Description ==
The document was written by an unknown copyist. It contains the text of Against Timocrates (sections 145, 146, 150) by Demosthenes. The measurements of the fragment are 108 by 93 mm. The text is written in a small uncial hand. Palaeographically it resembles Papyrus Oxyrhynchus 232. There are a few corrections in a second hand, which also probably inserted all the stops but one.

It was discovered by Grenfell and Hunt in 1897 in Oxyrhynchus. The text was published by Grenfell and Hunt in 1899.

== See also ==
- Oxyrhynchus Papyri
- Papyrus Oxyrhynchus 232
- Papyrus Oxyrhynchus 234
