= Papyrus Oxyrhynchus 237 =

Greek manuscript

Papyrus Oxyrhynchus 237 (P. Oxy. 237 or P. Oxy. II 237) consists of a fragment of Petition of Dionysia to the Praefect, written in Greek. They were discovered in Oxyrhynchus. The manuscript was written on papyrus in the form of a roll. It was written after 27 June 186. Currently it is housed in the Bodleian Library (Ms. Gr. Class. a 8).

== Description ==
This a long and important papyrus, on the side verso it contains most of the fifth book of the Iliad (cataloged as Papyrus Oxyrhynchus 223). On the side recto it contains a petition addressed by Dionysia to Pomponius Faustianus, praefect in the 26th year of Commodus. The text is written in a cursive hand. It is a copy of the original document which was sent to the praefect.

It was discovered by Grenfell and Hunt in 1897 in Oxyrhynchus. The text was published by Grenfell and Hunt in 1899.

== See also ==
- Oxyrhynchus Papyri
