= Papyrus Oxyrhynchus 23 =

Fragment of Plato's Laws, book 9

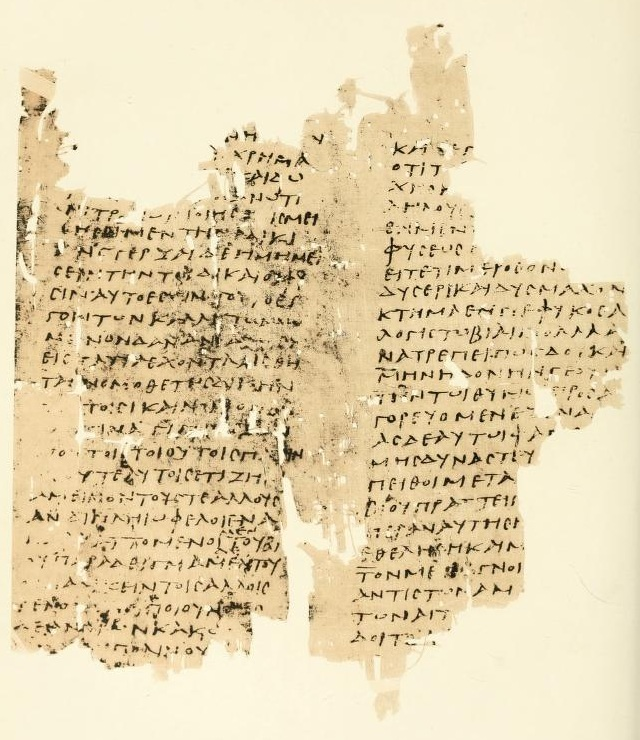
P. Oxy. 23

Papyrus Oxyrhynchus 23 (P. Oxy. 23) is a fragment of the ninth book of Plato's Laws, written in Greek. It was discovered by Grenfell and Hunt in 1897 in Oxyrhynchus. The fragment is dated to the third century. It is housed in the Cambridge University Library. The text was published by Grenfell and Hunt in 1898.

The manuscript was written on papyrus in the form of a roll. The measurements of the fragment are 182 by 185 mm. The text is written in a good-sized square sloping uncial hand.

== See also ==
- Oxyrhynchus Papyri
- Papyrus Oxyrhynchus 22
- Papyrus Oxyrhynchus 24
