= Papyrus Oxyrhynchus 231 =

Greek papyrus fragment

Papyrus Oxyrhynchus 231 (P. Oxy. 231 or P. Oxy. II 231) is a fragment of the De Corona by Demosthenes, written in Greek. It was discovered in Oxyrhynchus. The manuscript was written on papyrus in the form of a roll. It is dated to the second or third century. Currently it is housed in the Cambridge University Library (Add. Ms. 4050) in Cambridge.

== Description ==
The document was written by an unknown copyist. It contains part of the text of De Corona (227-229) by Demosthenes. The measurements of the fragment are 920 by 730 mm. The text is written in a medium-sized informal uncial hand. It uses punctuation, which is due to the original scribe. There are no remarkable textual variations.

It was discovered by Grenfell and Hunt in 1897 in Oxyrhynchus. The text was published by Grenfell and Hunt in 1899.

== See also ==
- Oxyrhynchus Papyri
- Papyrus Oxyrhynchus 25
- Papyrus Oxyrhynchus 230
- Papyrus Oxyrhynchus 232
