= Papyrus Oxyrhynchus 234 =

Greek papyrus fragment

Papyrus Oxyrhynchus 234 (P. Oxy. 234 or P. Oxy. II 234) is a fragment of a treatise on medical prescriptions by an unknown author, written in Greek. It was discovered in Oxyrhynchus. The manuscript was written on papyrus in the form of a sheet. It is dated to the second or third century. Currently it is housed in the library of the University of St Andrews in Fife.

== Description ==
The document was written by an unknown copyist. The verso side contains the medical text. The measurements of the fragment are 306 by 87 mm. The text is written in a round upright medium-sized uncial hand. The recto side is written in an upright cursive hand and contains a memorandum concerning a lease.

It was discovered by Grenfell and Hunt in 1897 in Oxyrhynchus. The text was published by Grenfell and Hunt in 1899.

== Text ==
Another:—Heat an equal quantity of beaver-musk and poppy-juice upon a potsherd, if possible one of Attic make, but failing that of...; soften by diluting with raisin wine, warm, and drop in.

Another:—Dilute some gum with balsam of lilies, and add honey and rose-extract. Twist some wool with the oil in it round a probe, warm, and drop in.

Another:—Pound some closed calices of pomegranates, drop on saffron-water, and when it becomes discoloured draw the liquor off. When required dilute as much as the bulk of a pea with raisin wine, warm, and drop in.

Clysters for the ear against earache:

Dilute frankincense with very sweet wine and syringe the ear; or use for this purpose the injections described above.

Another:—Rinse with warm onion-juice.

Another:—Syringe with gall of a bull or goat or sheep, or other similar kind of gall, warmed.

Another:—The sap of a pine tree, warmed, to be used in the same way.

== See also ==
- Oxyrhynchus Papyri
- Papyrus Oxyrhynchus 233
- Papyrus Oxyrhynchus 235
