= Papyrus Oxyrhynchus 21 =

Greek papyrus fragment

- Institute for the Study of Ancient Cultures, E2058
- Date: 1st–2nd century AD
- Language: Greek
- Material: Papyrus
- Size: 200 x 147 mm
- Contents: Homer's Iliad 2.745–764
- Discovered: 1897

Papyrus Oxyrhynchus 21 (P. Oxy. 21) is a fragment of the second book of the Iliad (Β, 745–764), written in Greek. It was discovered by Grenfell and Hunt in 1897 in Oxyrhynchus. The fragment is dated to the first or second century AD. It is housed in the Institute for the Study of Ancient Cultures at the University of Chicago. The text was published by Grenfell and Hunt in 1898.

The manuscript was written on papyrus in the form of a roll. The measurements of the fragment are 200 mm × 147 mm (7.9 in × 5.8 in). The fragment contains 20 lines of text. The text is written in a large round upright uncial hand. There are rough breathings and accents.

== See also ==
- Oxyrhynchus Papyri
- Papyrus Oxyrhynchus 20
- Papyrus Oxyrhynchus 22
