= Iliad =

Epic poem attributed to Homer

- Attributed to Homer
- Iliad papyrus fragment from the Ptolemaic Dynasty, Egypt, second century B.C.
- Original title: Ἰλιάς
- Translator: George Chapman and others; see English translations of Homer
- Composed: Late 8th to mid 7th century BC
- Country: Ancient Greece
- Language: Homeric Greek
- Subject: Trojan War
- Genre: Epic poetry
- Published in English: 1598; 428 years ago
- Lines: 15,693
- Followed by: The Odyssey
- Metre: Dactylic hexameter

Full text
- Iliad at Wikisource
- Ιλιάς at Greek Wikisource

The Iliad (/ˈɪl.i.əd/ ILL-ee-əd; Ancient Greek: Ἰλιάς, romanized: Iliás [iːliás]; lit. '[a poem] about Ilion (Troy)') is one of two major surviving ancient Greek epic poems, along with the Odyssey, attributed to Homer. It is one of the oldest extant works of literature still widely read by modern readers. Like the Odyssey, the poem is divided into 24 books and was written in dactylic hexameter. It contains 15,693 lines in its standard edition. The Iliad is often regarded as the first substantial piece of European literature and is central to the study of classical philology.

Set towards the end of the Trojan War, a 10-year siege of the city of Troy by a coalition of Mycenaean Greek states, the poem depicts significant events in the war's final weeks. It focuses primarily on Achilles, a celebrated warrior, whose wrath (mēnis) is the driving force of the narrative, from his fierce quarrel with the king of Mycenae, Agamemnon, to his killing of the Trojan prince Hector. The narrative moves between wide battleground scenes and more personal interactions. Contrary to popular belief, the Iliad does not depict the fall of Troy nor mention the Trojan Horse used by the Greeks to conquer the city; these elements are attributed to later sources.

The Iliad and the Odyssey were likely composed in Homeric Greek, a literary mixture of Ionic Greek and other dialects, sometime between the late 8th to early 7th century. The poem's composition, historicity, and authorship are extensively debated (the Homeric Question), with Homeric scholars likewise debating whether the Iliad and the Odyssey were composed independently, and whether they survived via an oral or also written tradition. The poem's formulae, use of similes, and epithets are often explored by scholars. The Iliad was widely esteemed by the ancient Greeks and formed part of their standard education; the poem's conflation of different regional dialects, and its depiction of various Greek factions uniting to fight Troy, gave it strong resonance across the Hellenistic world. It was performed by professional reciters known as rhapsodes at Greek festivals such as the Panathenaia.

Critical themes in the Iliad include kleos (glory), pride, fate, and wrath. Despite being predominantly known for its tragic and serious themes, the poem also contains instances of comedy and humor. It is frequently described as a "heroic" epic, centred around issues such as war, violence, and the heroic code. The poem contains detailed descriptions of ancient warfare, including battle tactics and equipment, and also explores social and domestic aspects of ancient culture, through scenes behind the walls of Troy and in the Greek camp. Additionally, the Olympian gods play a major role, aiding their favoured warriors and cities on the battlefield and intervening in personal disputes. Their anthropomorphic characterisation in the poem humanised them for Ancient Greek audiences, giving a concrete sense of their cultural and religious tradition.

== Synopsis ==
=== Books 1–4 ===
The first verses of the Iliad

The story begins with an invocation to the Muse. The events take place towards the end of the Trojan War, fought between the Trojans and the besieging Achaeans (Homer interchangeably refers to the Greeks as "Achaeans", "Argives" or "Danaans"). The Achaean forces consist of armies from many different Greek kingdoms, led by their respective kings or princes. Agamemnon, king of Mycenae, acts as commander for these united armies.

After nine years of fighting, the Achaeans had sacked some towns allied with Troy, and captured two maidens, Chryseis and Briseis. Agamemnon, the leader, took Chryseis as his concubine; Achilles, the Achaeans' greatest warrior, took Briseis.

Chryses, father of Chryseis and a priest of Apollo, offered Agamemnon a large ransom for the return of his daughter. Agamemnon refused, against the wishes of the other Achaeans, and insulted the priest.

The priest asks Apollo for vengeance, and Apollo inflicts a plague upon the Achaeans to punish them for the rudeness of Agamemnon to his priest. After nine days of plague, Achilles, the leader of the Myrmidon forces and aristos achaion ("best of the Greeks"), calls for an assembly.

Under pressure, Agamemnon agrees to return Chryseis to her father but decides to take Achilles's slave, Briseis, as compensation. Viewing Agamemnon's decision as a huge dishonour in front of the assembled Achaean forces, Achilles furiously declares that he and his men will no longer fight for Agamemnon. Odysseus returns Chryseis to her father, causing Apollo to end the plague.

In the meantime, Agamemnon's messengers take Briseis away. Achilles becomes very upset and prays to his mother, Thetis, a minor goddess and sea nymph. Achilles asks his mother to supplicate Zeus, wanting the Achaeans to be beaten back by the Trojans until their ships are at risk of being burnt. Only then will Agamemnon realise how much the Achaeans need Achilles and restore his honour. Thetis does so, and Zeus agrees. Zeus then sends a dream to Agamemnon, urging him to attack Troy. Agamemnon heeds the dream but first decides to test the Achaean army's morale by telling them to go home. However nine years into the war, the soldiers' morale has worn thin. The plan backfires, and only the intervention of Odysseus, inspired by Athena, stops a rout. Odysseus confronts and beats Thersites, a common soldier who voices discontent about fighting Agamemnon's war.

The Achaeans deploy in companies upon the Trojan plain. When news of the Achaean deployment reaches King Priam, the Trojans respond in a sortie upon the plain. The armies approach each other, but before they meet, Paris, urged by Hector, his brother and hero of Troy, offers to end the war by fighting a duel with Menelaus. Here, the initial cause of the entire war is explained: Helen, wife of Menelaus, and the most beautiful woman in the world, was taken by Paris from Menelaus's home in Sparta. Menelaus and Paris agree to duel; Helen will marry the victor. However, when Paris is defeated, Aphrodite rescues him and leads him to bed with Helen before Menelaus can kill him.

The gods deliberate over whether the war should end here, but Hera convinces Zeus to wait for the utter destruction of Troy. Athena prompts the Trojan archer Pandarus to shoot Menelaus. Menelaus is wounded, and the truce is broken. Fighting breaks out, and many Achaeans and Trojans are killed.

=== Books 5–7 ===
In the fighting, Diomedes kills many Trojans, including Pandarus, and defeats Aeneas. Aphrodite rescues Aeneas before he can be killed, but Diomedes attacks her and wounds the goddess's wrist. Apollo faces Diomedes and warns him against warring with gods, which Diomedes ignores. Apollo sends Ares to defeat Diomedes. Many heroes and commanders join in, including Hector, and the gods supporting each side try to influence the battle. Emboldened by Athena, Diomedes wounds Ares and puts him out of action.

Hector rallies the Trojans and prevents a rout. Diomedes and the Trojan Glaucus find common ground after a duel and exchange unequal gifts, sparked by Glaucus's story of Bellerophon. Hector enters the city, urging his mother Hecuba to perform prayers and sacrifices, inciting Paris to battle, and bidding his wife Andromache and son Astyanax farewell on the city walls. He then rejoins the battle. Hector duels with Ajax, but nightfall interrupts the fight, and both sides retire. The Trojans quarrel about returning Helen to the Achaeans. Paris offers to return the treasure he took and give further wealth as compensation, but not Helen, and the offer is refused. Both sides agree to a day's truce to bury the dead. The Achaeans also build a wall and trench to protect their camp and ships.

=== Books 8–15 ===
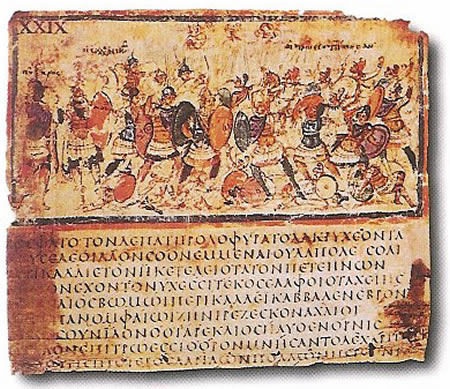
Iliad, Book VIII, lines 245–253, Greek manuscript, late 5th, early 6th centuries AD

The next morning, Zeus prohibits the gods from interfering, and fighting begins anew. The Trojans prevail and force the Achaeans back to their wall. Hera and Athena are forbidden to help. Night falls before the Trojans can assail the Achaean wall. They camp in the field to attack at first light, and their watchfires light the plain like stars.

Meanwhile, the Achaeans are desperate. Agamemnon admits his error and sends an embassy composed of Odysseus, Ajax, and Phoenix to offer Briseis and extensive gifts to Achilles, if he will return to the fighting. Achilles and his companion Patroclus receive the embassy, yet Achilles angrily refuses the offer, considering the slight to his honour too great. He declares that he will return to battle only if the Trojans reach his ships and threaten them with fire. The embassy returns, unsuccessful.

Later that night, Odysseus and Diomedes venture out to the Trojan lines, kill the Trojan Dolon, and wreak havoc in the camp of some Thracian allies of Troy. In the morning, the fighting is fierce, and Agamemnon, Diomedes, and Odysseus are all wounded. Achilles sends Patroclus from his camp to inquire about the Achaean casualties, and while there, Patroclus is moved to pity by a speech by Nestor. Nestor asks Patroclus to beg Achilles to rejoin the fighting, or if he will not, to lead the army himself wearing Achilles's armor.

The Trojans attack the Achaean wall on foot. Hector leads the terrible fighting, despite an omen that their charge will fail. The Achaeans are overwhelmed and routed, the wall's gate is broken, and Hector charges in. The Achaeans fall back to their ships.

Poseidon pities the Achaeans and decides to disobey Zeus and help them. He rallies the Achaeans' spirits, and they begin to push the Trojans back. Poseidon's grandson Amphimachus is killed in the battle; Poseidon imbues Idomeneus with godly power. Many fall on both sides. The Trojan seer Polydamas urges Hector to fall back because of a bad omen but is ignored.

Hera seduces Zeus and lulls him to sleep, allowing Poseidon to help the Greeks. The Trojans are driven back onto the plain. Ajax wounds Hector, who is then carried back to Troy. Zeus awakes and is enraged by Poseidon's intervention. However, he reassures Hera that Troy is still fated to fall once Hector kills Patroclus. Poseidon is recalled from the battlefield, and Zeus sends Apollo to aid the Trojans. The Trojans once again breach the wall, and the battle reaches the ships.

=== Books 16–18 ===
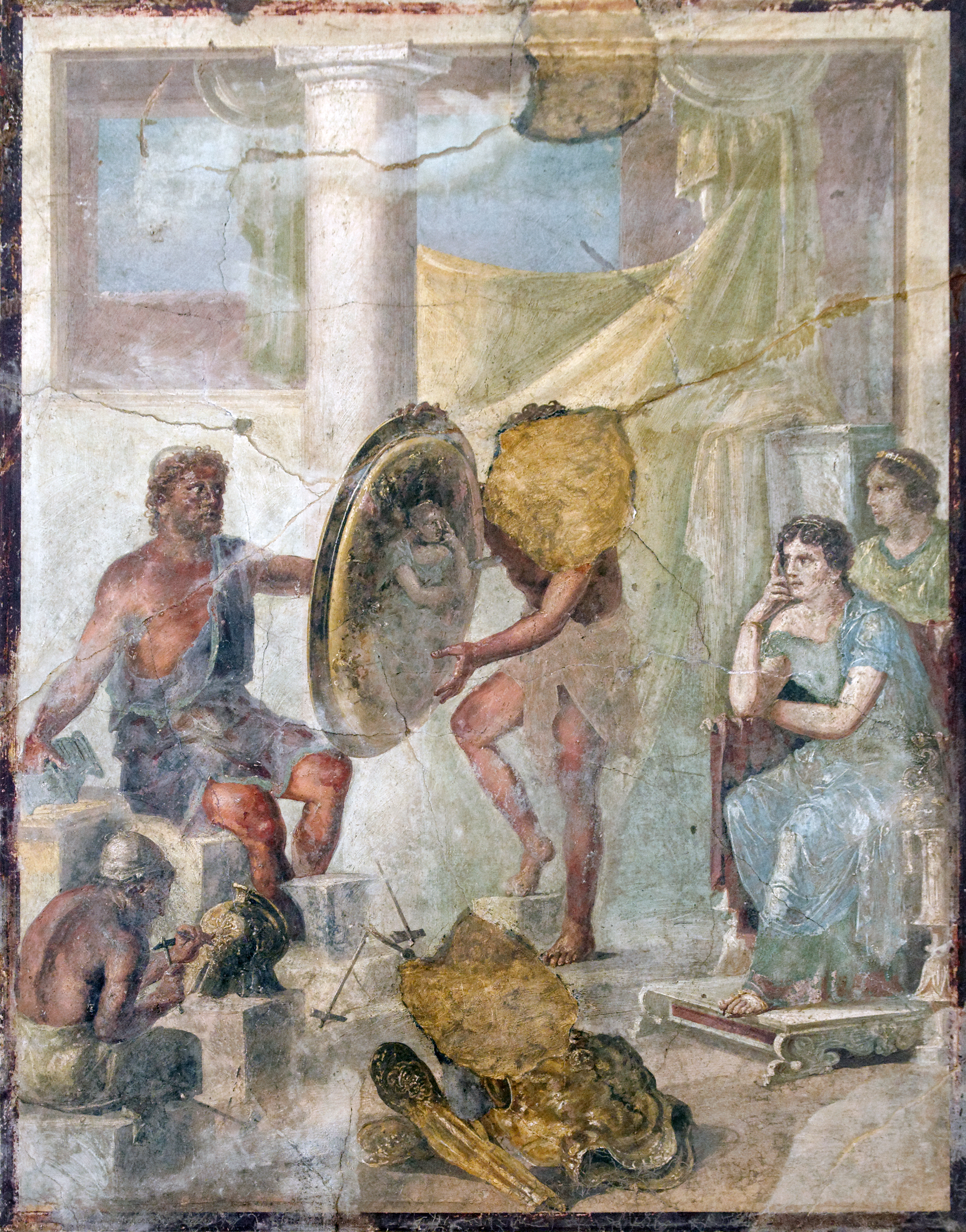
Thetis at Hephaestus's forge waiting to receive Achilles's new weapons, fresco from Pompeii, 1st century

Patroclus cannot stand to watch any longer and goes to Achilles, weeping. He admonishes him for his stubbornness and then asks him to allow him to fight in his place, wearing Achilles's armor so that he will be mistaken for him. Achilles relents and lends Patroclus his armor but sends him off with a stern warning to come back once the Trojans have been pushed back and not to pursue them to the walls. Achilles says that after all has been made right, he and Patroclus will take Troy together.

Patroclus leads the Myrmidons into battle and arrives as the Trojans set fire to the first ships. The Trojans are routed by the sudden onslaught, and Patroclus begins his assault by killing Zeus's son Sarpedon, a leading ally of the Trojans. Patroclus, ignoring Achilles's command, pursues and reaches the gates of Troy, where Apollo himself stops him. Patroclus kills Hector's charioteer Cebriones, is weakened by Apollo and Euphorbos, and is finally killed by Hector.

Hector takes Achilles's armor from the fallen Patroclus. The Achaeans fight to retrieve Patroclus's body from the Trojans, who attempt to carry it back to Troy at Hector's command. Antilochus is sent to tell Achilles the news and asks him to help retrieve the body.

When Achilles hears of Patroclus's death, his grief is so overwhelming that his mother, Thetis, hears him from the bottom of the ocean. Thetis grieves too, knowing that Achilles is fated to die if he kills Hector. Although he knows it will seal his own fate, Achilles vows to kill Hector in order to avenge Patroclus.

Achilles is urged to help retrieve Patroclus's body but has no armor to wear. Bathed in a brilliant radiance by Athena, Achilles stands next to the Achaean wall and roars in rage. The Trojans are terrified by his appearance, and the Achaeans manage to bear Patroclus's body away. Polydamas again urges Hector to withdraw into the city; again, Hector refuses, and the Trojans camp on the plain at nightfall.

Achilles mourns Patroclus, brokenhearted. Meanwhile, at Thetis's request, Hephaestus fashions a new set of armor for Achilles, including a magnificently wrought shield.

=== Books 19–24 ===
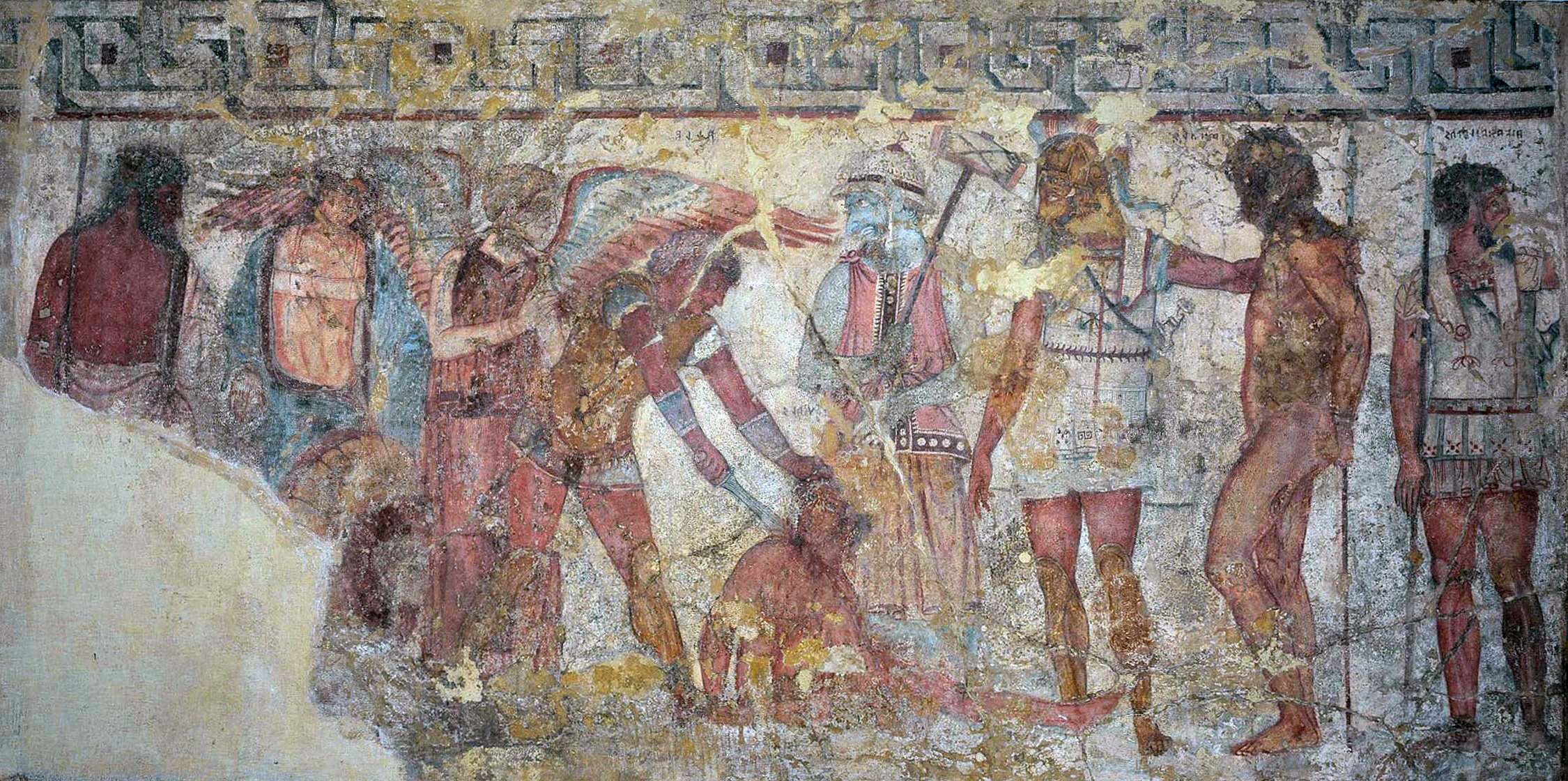
A detail of fresco from the François Tomb at Vulci, showing the sacrifice of Trojan slaves. From left to right: Agamemnon, ghost of Patroclus, Vanth, Achilles beheading a slave, Charun, Ajax the Great, a slave, Ajax the Lesser. 350–330 BC

In the morning, Thetis brings Achilles his new set of armor, only to find him weeping over Patroclus's body. Achilles arms for battle and rallies the Achaean warriors. Agamemnon gives Achilles all the promised gifts, including Briseis, but Achilles is indifferent to them. The Achaeans take their meal, but Achilles refuses to eat. His horse, Xanthos, prophesies Achilles's death; Achilles is indifferent. Achilles goes into battle, with Automedon driving his chariot.

Zeus lifts the ban on the gods' interference, and the gods freely help both sides. Achilles, burning with rage and grief, slays many Trojans. Achilles slaughters half the Trojans' number in the river, clogging the water with bodies. The river god, Scamander, confronts Achilles and commands him to stop killing Trojans, but Achilles refuses. They fight until Scamander is beaten back by Hephaestus's firestorm. The gods fight amongst themselves. The great gates of the city are opened to receive the fleeing Trojans, and Apollo leads Achilles away from the city by pretending to be a Trojan. When Apollo reveals himself to Achilles, the Trojans have retreated into the safety of the city, all except for Hector.

Despite the pleas of his parents, Priam and Hecuba, Hector resolves to face Achilles. When Achilles approaches, however, Hector's will fails him. He flees and is chased by Achilles around the city. Finally, Athena tricks him into stopping by taking on the form of his brother Deiphobus, and he turns to face his opponent. After a brief duel, Achilles stabs Hector through the neck. Before dying, Hector reminds Achilles that he, too, is fated to die. Achilles strips Hector of his own armour, gloating over his death. Achilles then dishonours Hector's body by lashing it to the back of his chariot and dragging it around the city. Hecuba and Priam lament, with the latter attempting to face Achilles himself. Andromache hears the news and comes to the walls, fainting on seeing the scene below. The Trojans grieve.

The ghost of Patroclus comes to Achilles in a dream, urging him to carry out the burial rites so that his spirit can move on to the Underworld. Patroclus asks Achilles to arrange for their bones to be entombed together in a single urn; Achilles agrees, and Patroclus's body is cremated. The Achaeans hold a day of funeral games, and Achilles gives out the prizes.

Achilles is lost in his grief and spends his days mourning Patroclus and dragging Hector's body behind his chariot. Dismayed by Achilles's continued abuse of Hector's body, Zeus decides that it must be returned to Priam. Led by Hermes, Priam takes a wagon filled with gifts across the plains and into the Achaean camp unnoticed. He clasps Achilles by the knees and begs for his son's body. Achilles is moved to tears and finally relents, softening his anger. The two lament their losses in the war. Achilles agrees to give Hector's body back and to give the Trojans twelve days to properly mourn and bury him. Achilles apologises to Patroclus, fearing he has dishonored him by returning Hector's body. After a meal, Priam carries Hector's body back into Troy. Hector is buried, and the city mourns.

== Themes ==
=== Religion ===
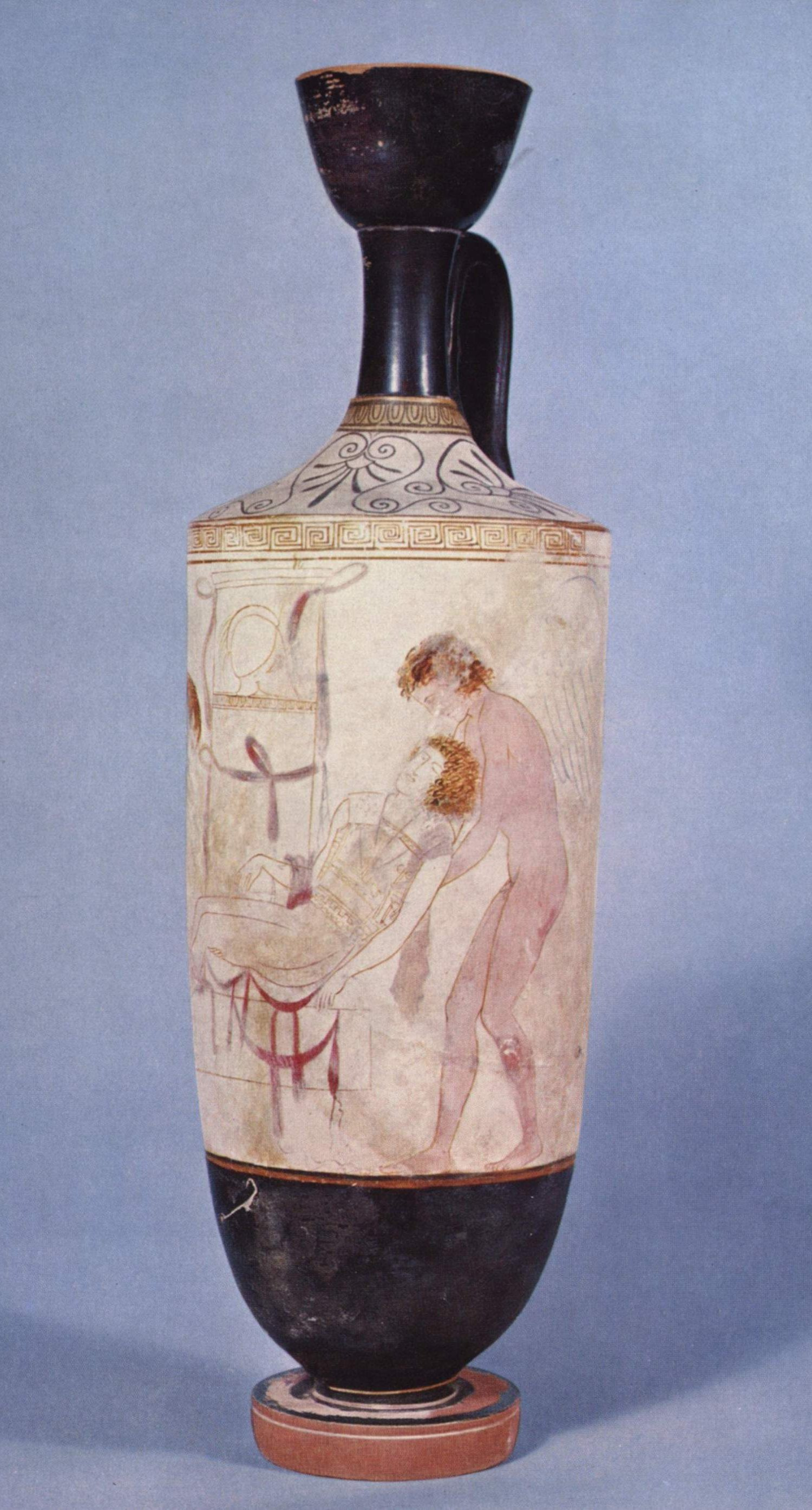
Hypnos and Thanatos carrying the body of Sarpedon from the battlefield of Troy; detail from an Attic white-ground lekythos, c. 440 BC

Ancient Greek religion had no strict organisation, rather arising out of the diverse beliefs of the Greek people. Adkins and Pollard state that "The early Greeks personalized every aspect of their world, natural and cultural, and their experiences in it. The earth, the sea, the mountains, the rivers, custom-law (themis), and one's share in society and its goods were all seen in personal as well as naturalistic terms". They perceived the world and its changes as a result of divine intervention or presence. Often, they found these events to be mysterious and inexplicable.

In the Iliad, the Olympian gods, goddesses, and minor deities fight among themselves as well as participating in human warfare, often by interfering with mortals to oppose other gods. Homer's portrayal of gods suits his narrative purpose, although the gods in 4th century Athenian thought were not spoken of in terms familiar to the works of Homer. The historian Herodotus says that Homer, to whom he attributes the Iliad and the Odyssey, helped establish the names and characteristics of the gods.

Some scholars discuss the intervention of the gods in the mortal world, spurred by quarrels they had with each other. Homer interprets the Iliadic world by using the passion and emotion of the gods to be determining factors of what happens on the human level. Book 24 offers a retrospective discussion of the cause of the war, attributing it to the anger of Hera and Athena:

And though this was pleasing to all the rest, it was not to Hera
or Poseidon or the flashing-eyed maiden,
but they persisted just as when sacred Ilios at first became hateful in their eyes
and Priam and his people, because of the folly of Alexander,
who had insulted those goddesses when they came to his farmstead
and praised her who furthered his grievous lustfulness.

— Homer, Iliad 24.25–30

Athena and Hera oppose Paris because of a beauty contest on Mount Olympus in which he chose Aphrodite as the most beautiful goddess over them. Wolfgang Kullmann further goes on to say, "Hera's and Athena's disappointment over the victory of Aphrodite in the Judgement of Paris determines the whole conduct of both goddesses in The Iliad and is the cause of their hatred for Paris, the Judge, and his town Troy".

Hera and Athena continue to support the Achaean forces throughout the poem as a result of this, while Aphrodite aids Paris and the Trojans. The emotions between the goddesses often translate to actions they take in the mortal world. For example, in Book 3 of the Iliad, Paris is about to be defeated by Menelaus, who had challenged him to single combat, however, Aphrodite intervenes to save Paris from the wrath of Menelaus: "Now he'd have hauled him off and won undying glory but Aphrodite, Zeus's daughter, was quick to the mark, snapped the rawhide strap." This connection of emotions to actions is just one example out of many that occur throughout the poem: there is constant intervention by all of the gods, especially to give motivational speeches to their respective protégés, often appearing in the shape of a human being they are familiar with.

Mary Lefkowitz discusses the relevance of divine action in the Iliad, attempting to answer the question of whether divine intervention is a discrete occurrence (for its own sake) or if such godly behaviors are mere human character metaphors. The intellectual interest of 5th- and 4th-century BC authors, such as Thucydides and Plato, was limited to their utility as "a way of talking about human life rather than a description or a truth", because, if the gods remain religious figures, rather than human metaphors, their "existence" – without the foundation of either dogma or a bible of faiths – then allowed Greek culture the intellectual breadth and freedom to conjure gods fitting any religious function they required as a people.

Psychologist Julian Jaynes uses the Iliad as a major piece of evidence for his theory of the Bicameral Mind, which posits that until about the time described in the Iliad, humans had a far different mentality from present-day humans. He says that humans during that time were lacking what is today called consciousness. He suggests that humans heard and obeyed commands from what they identified as gods until the change in human mentality that incorporated the motivating force into the conscious self. He points out that almost every action in the Iliad is directed, caused, or influenced by a god and that earlier translations show an astonishing lack of words suggesting thought, planning, or introspection. Those that do appear, he argues, are misinterpretations made by translators imposing a modern mentality on the characters, a form of reverse logic by which a conclusion determines the validity of evidence.

=== Fate ===
Fate (κήρ, kēr, 'fated death') propels most of the events of the Iliad. Gods and men abide by it, unable to contest or change it. It is highlighted and referenced throughout the narrative in multiple methods, for example, Zeus sending omens to seers such as Calchas, or Thetis's prophecies of Achilles's imminent death. Men and their gods continually speak of heroic acceptance and cowardly avoidance of one's fate. Fate does not determine every action, incident, and occurrence, but it does determine the outcome of life. For example, Patroclus prophesies Hector's death:

No, deadly destiny, with the son of Leto, has killed me,
and of men it was Euphorbos; you are only my third slayer.
And put away in your heart this other thing that I tell you.
You yourself are not one who shall live long, but now already
death and powerful destiny are standing beside you,
to go down under the hands of Aiakos' great son, Achilleus.

— Homer, Iliad 16.849–854 Lattimore (1951), p. 353.

Here, Patroclus alludes to his fated death by Hector's hand and to Hector's fated death by Achilles's hand. Each accepts the outcome of his life, yet persist regardless. However, fate is not always accepted outright. The first instance of this doubt occurs in Book 16. Seeing Patroclus about to kill Sarpedon, his mortal son, Zeus says:

Ah me, that it is destined that the dearest of men, Sarpedon,
must go down under the hands of Menoitios' son Patroclus.

— Homer, The Iliad. 16.433–434 Lattimore (1951), p. 342.

About his dilemma, Hera asks Zeus:

Majesty, son of Kronos, what sort of thing have you spoken?
Do you wish to bring back a man who is mortal, one long since
doomed by his destiny, from ill-sounding death and release him?
Do it, then; but not all the rest of us gods shall approve you.

— Homer, The Iliad 16.440–43 Lattimore (1951), p. 342.

In deciding between losing a son or abiding fate, Zeus, King of the Gods, must conform to the latter. This motif recurs when he considers sparing Hector, whom he loves and respects. This time, it is Athena who challenges him:

Father of the shining bolt, dark misted, what is this you said?
Do you wish to bring back a man who is mortal, one long since
doomed by his destiny, from ill-sounding death and release him?
Do it, then; but not all the rest of us gods shall approve you.

— Homer, The Iliad 22.178–81 Lattimore (1951), p. 440.

Again, Zeus appears capable of altering fate, but does not, deciding instead to abide by set outcomes. Similarly, Fate spares Aeneas after Apollo convinces the overmatched Trojan to fight Achilles. Poseidon cautiously speaks:

But come, let us ourselves get him away from death, for fear
the son of Kronos may be angered if now Achilleus
kills this man. It is destined that he shall be the survivor,
that the generation of Dardanos shall not die…

— Homer, The Iliad 20.300–04 Lattimore (1951), p. 412.

Divinely aided, Aeneas escapes the wrath of Achilles and survives the Trojan War. Whether or not the gods can alter fate, they do abide by it, despite its countering their human allegiances. The mysterious origin of Fate remains a power beyond both mortals and immortals.

=== Kleos ===
Kleos (κλέος, "glory, fame") is the concept of glory earned in heroic battle. It is a fluctuating quality that can be given or taken, increased or decreased. In particular, Achilles is deeply concerned about his kleos. In Book 9 (9.410–16), Achilles poignantly tells Agamemnon's envoys – Odysseus, Phoenix, and Ajax – begging his reinstatement to battle about having to choose between two fates (διχθαδίας κήρας, 9.411).

The passage reads:

μήτηρ γάρ τέ μέ φησι θεὰ Θέτις ἀργυρόπεζα (410)
διχθαδίας κῆρας φερέμεν θανάτοιο τέλος δέ.
εἰ μέν κ' αὖθι μένων Τρώων πόλιν ἀμφιμάχωμαι,
ὤλετο μέν μοι νόστος, ἀτὰρ κλέος ἄφθιτον ἔσται
εἰ δέ κεν οἴκαδ' ἵκωμι φίλην ἐς πατρίδα γαῖαν,
ὤλετό μοι κλέος ἐσθλόν, ἐπὶ δηρὸν δέ μοι αἰὼν (415)
ἔσσεται, οὐδέ κέ μ' ὦκα τέλος θανάτοιο κιχείη.

Translation:

For my mother Thetis the goddess of silver feet tells me
I carry two sorts of destiny toward the day of my death. Either,
if I stay here and fight beside the city of the Trojans,
my return home is gone, but my glory shall be everlasting;
but if I return home to the beloved land of my fathers,
the excellence of my glory is gone, but there will be a long life
left for me, and my end in death will not come to me quickly.

— Translated by Richmond Lattimore

In forgoing his nostos, he will earn the greater reward of kleos aphthiton (κλέος ἄφθιτον, "fame imperishable"). In the poem, aphthiton (ἄφθιτον, "imperishable") occurs five other times, each occurrence denotes an object: Agamemnon's sceptre, the wheel of Hebe's chariot, the house of Poseidon, the throne of Zeus, and the house of Hephaestus. Translator Lattimore renders kleos aphthiton as "forever immortal" and as "forever imperishable" – connoting Achilles's mortality by underscoring his greater reward in returning to battle Troy.

Kleos is often given visible representation by the prizes won in battle. When Agamemnon takes Briseis from Achilles, he takes away a portion of the kleos he had earned.

Achilles's shield, crafted by Hephaestus and given to him by his mother, Thetis, bears an image of stars in the centre. The stars conjure profound images of the place of a single man, no matter how heroic, in the perspective of the entire cosmos.

=== Nostos ===
Nostos (νόστος, "homecoming") occurs seven times in the poem, making it a minor theme in the Iliad itself. Yet the concept of homecoming is explored extensively in other Ancient Greek literature, especially in the postwar homeward fortunes experienced by the Atreidae (Agamemnon and Menelaus) and Odysseus (see the Odyssey).

=== Pride ===
Pride drives the plot of the Iliad. The Achaeans gather on the plain of Troy to wrest Helen from the Trojans. Though the majority of the Trojans would gladly return Helen to the Achaeans, they defer to the pride of their prince, Alexandros, also known as Paris. Within this frame, Homer's work begins. At the start of the Iliad, Agamemnon's pride sets forth a chain of events that leads him to take from Achilles, Briseis, the girl he had originally given Achilles in return for his martial prowess. Due to this slight, Achilles refuses to fight and asks his mother, Thetis, to make sure that Zeus causes the Achaeans to suffer on the battlefield until Agamemnon comes to realize the harm he has done to him.

Achilles's pride allows him to beg Thetis for the deaths of his Achaean friends. When in Book 9 his friends urge him to return, offering him loot and his slave, Briseis, he refuses, stuck in his vengeful pride. Achilles remains stuck until the very end, when his anger at himself for Patroclus's death overcomes his pride at Agamemnon's slight and he returns to kill Hector. He overcomes his pride again when he keeps his anger in check and returns Hector to Priam at the epic's close. From epic start to epic finish, pride drives the plot. (Note: Frobish (2003), p. 24 writes that the war "starts with his pride and immaturity, yet is finished with his skill and bravery on the battlefield.")

=== Heroism ===
The Iliad portrays the theme of heroism in a variety of different ways through different characters, mainly Achilles, Hector, Patroclus, etc. Though the traditional concept of heroism is often tied directly to the protagonist, who is meant to be written in a heroic light, the Iliad plays with this idea of heroism and does not make it explicitly clear who the true hero of the story is. The story of the Iliad follows the great Greek warrior Achilles, as well as his rage and the destruction it causes. Parallel to this, the story also follows the Trojan warrior Hector and his efforts to fight to protect his family and his people. It is generally assumed that, because he is the protagonist, Achilles is the hero of this story. Examining his actions throughout the Iliad and comparing them to those of other characters, however, some may come to the conclusion that Achilles is not really the hero, and perhaps even an antihero. It can also be argued that Hector is the true hero of the Iliad due to his inherently heroic qualities, such as his loyalty to his family and strength and determination to defend his people, and the focus at the end of the story on burying Hector with honor. The true hero of the Iliad is never shown explicitly and is purposefully left up to interpretation by the author, Homer, who aimed to show the complexity and flaws of both characters, regardless of who is considered the "true" hero.

=== Timē ===
Akin to kleos is timē (τιμή, "respect, honor"), the concept denoting the respectability an honorable man accrues with accomplishment (cultural, political, martial), per his station in life. In Book I, the Achaean troubles begin with King Agamemnon's dishonorable, unkingly behavior – first, by threatening the priest Chryses (1.11), then, by aggravating them in disrespecting Achilles, by confiscating Briseis from him (1.171). The warrior's consequent rancor against the dishonorable king ruins the Achaean military cause.

=== Hubris ===
Hybris (Ὕβρις) plays a part similar to timē. The epic takes as its thesis the anger of Achilles and the destruction it brings. Anger disturbs the distance between human beings and the gods. Uncontrolled anger destroys orderly social relationships and upsets the balance of correct actions necessary to keep the gods away from human beings. Despite the epic's focus on Achilles's rage, hybris also plays a prominent role, serving as both kindling and fuel for many destructive events.

Agamemnon refuses to ransom Chryseis out of hybris and harms Achilles's pride when he demands Briseis. Hubris forces Paris to fight against Menelaus. Agamemnon spurs the Achaeans to fight by calling into question Odysseus, Diomedes, and Nestor's pride, asking why they are cowering and waiting for help when they should be the ones leading the charge. While the events of the Iliad focus on Achilles's rage and the destruction it brings on, hybris fuels and stokes them both.

=== Mēnis ===
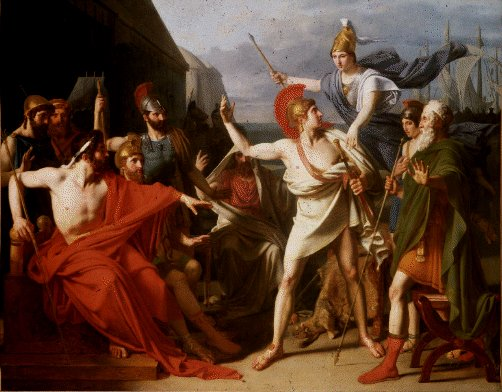
The Wrath of Achilles (1819), by Michel Martin Drolling

The poem's initial word, μῆνιν (mēnin; acc. μῆνις, mēnis, "wrath", "rage", "fury"), establishes the Iliad's principal theme: the "Wrath of Achilles". His personal rage and wounded soldier's pride propel the story: the Achaeans' faltering in battle, the slayings of Patroclus and Hector, and the fall of Troy. In Book I, the Wrath of Achilles first emerges in the Achilles-convoked meeting between the Greek kings and the seer Calchas. King Agamemnon dishonours Chryses, the Trojan priest of Apollo, by refusing with a threat the restitution of his daughter, Chryseis – despite the proffered ransom of "gifts beyond count". The insulted priest prays to Apollo for help, and a nine-day rain of divine plague arrows falls upon the Achaeans. Moreover, in that meeting, Achilles accuses Agamemnon of being "greediest for gain of all men". To that, Agamemnon replies:

But here is my threat to you.
Even as Phoibos Apollo is taking away my Chryseis.
I shall convey her back in my own ship, with my own
followers; but I shall take the fair-cheeked Briseis,
your prize, I myself going to your shelter, that you may learn well
how much greater I am than you, and another man may shrink back
from likening himself to me and contending against me.

— Homer, Iliad 1.181–187 Lattimore (1951), p. 64.

After that, only Athena stays Achilles's wrath. He vows to never again obey orders from Agamemnon. Furious, Achilles cries to his mother, Thetis, who persuades Zeus's divine intervention – favouring the Trojans – until Achilles's rights are restored. Meanwhile, Hector leads the Trojans to almost pushing the Achaeans back to the sea (Book XII). Later, Agamemnon contemplates defeat and retreat to Greece (Book XIV). Again, the Wrath of Achilles turns the war's tide in seeking vengeance when Hector kills Patroclus. Aggrieved, Achilles tears his hair and dirties his face. Thetis comforts her mourning son, who tells her:

So it was here that the lord of men Agamemnon angered me.
Still, we will let all this be a thing of the past, and for all our
sorrow beat down by force the anger deeply within us.
Now I shall go, to overtake that killer of a dear life,
Hektor; then I will accept my own death, at whatever
time Zeus wishes to bring it about, and the other immortals.

— Homer, Iliad 18.111–116 Lattimore (1951), p. 378.

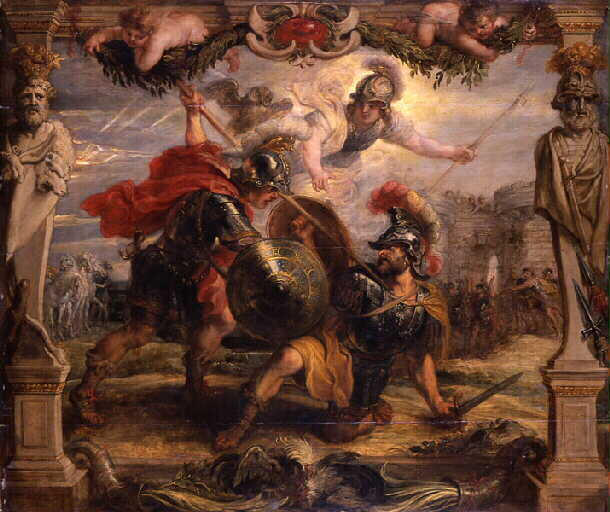
Achilles Slays Hector, by Peter Paul Rubens (1630–1635)

Accepting the prospect of death as fair price for avenging Patroclus, he returns to battle, dooming Hector and Troy, thrice chasing him around the Trojan walls before slaying him and then dragging the corpse behind his chariot, back to camp.

=== War ===
Much of the Iliad focuses on death-dealing. To gain status, heroes must be good at killing. Though not as prevalent, there are instances where the author showcases the peaceful aspects of war. The first instance of this is in book 3 when Menelaus and Paris agree to fight a one-on-one to end the war. This conversation between Menelaus and Paris highlights the overwhelming desire for peace on both sides. Also in book 3, we see peace when the elders talk to Priam saying that though Helen is a beautiful woman, war is still too high a price to pay for one person. These events display the humanity of the war. In book 6, when Hector goes back into the city to visit his family, this event is another powerful show of peace because we get to see that Hector is more than a great warrior. He is a loving father and devoted husband. The love that is shared between him and his family contrasts with the gory battle scenes, noting the importance of peace. The final moments of peace are in books 23 and 24. The first of these is the funeral games that are held for Patroclus. The games show the happiness, grief, and joy that can happen during the war. In book 24, peace is highlighted again when Achilles and Priam share food and grief for their recent losses. In this encounter, the two empathize with one another and agree to a truce of twelve days for the burial of Hector.

== Date and textual history ==
Map of Homeric Greece

The poem dates to the archaic period of Classical antiquity. Scholarly consensus mostly places it in the late 8th century BC, although some favour a 7th-century date. In any case, the terminus ante quem for the dating of the Iliad is 630 BC, as evidenced by reflection in art and literature.

Herodotus, having consulted the Oracle at Dodona, placed Homer and Hesiod at approximately 400 years before his own time, which would place them at c. 850 BC.

The historical backdrop of the poem is the time of the Late Bronze Age collapse, in the early 12th century BC. Homer is thus separated from his subject matter by about 400 years, the period known as the Greek Dark Ages. Intense scholarly debate has surrounded the question of which portions of the poem preserve genuine traditions from the Mycenaean period. The Catalogue of Ships in particular has the striking feature that its geography does not portray Greece in the Iron Age, the time of Homer, but as it was before the Dorian invasion.

The title Ἰλιάς (Ilias; gen. Ἰλιάδος, Iliados) is an ellipsis of "ἡ ποίησις Ἰλιάς, he poíesis Iliás", meaning "the Ilian (Trojan) poem". Ἰλιάς (of Ilion/Troy) is the specifically feminine adjective form from Ἴλιον (Ilion/Troy). The masculine adjective form would be Ἰλιακός or Ἴλιος. It is used by Herodotus.

In May 2026, an Egyptian mummy from around 400 CE was found with a fragment of the Iliad placed inside. Such texts were not uncommon in the Greco-Roman period, but had not previously been found in funerary contexts.

The earliest complete textual witness to the Iliad is Venetus A (Venetus Graec. 822; formerly Marc. graec. 454), a Byzantine manuscript copied in the 10th century AD. It contains the text of the Iliad annotated with glosses, as well as the "A scholia", critical and explanatory notes mainly excerpted from now-lost works of the grammarians Aristonicus, Didymus, Herodian and Nicanor. An important witness for Hellenistic Homeric scholarship, the manuscript supplies many ancient readings not surviving elsewhere, and editors consider it of critical importance for the restoration of the Iliad's text.

The first edition of the Iliad, editio princeps, was edited by Demetrios Chalkokondyles and published by Bernardus Nerlius and Demetrius Damilas in Florence in 1489.

=== As oral tradition ===
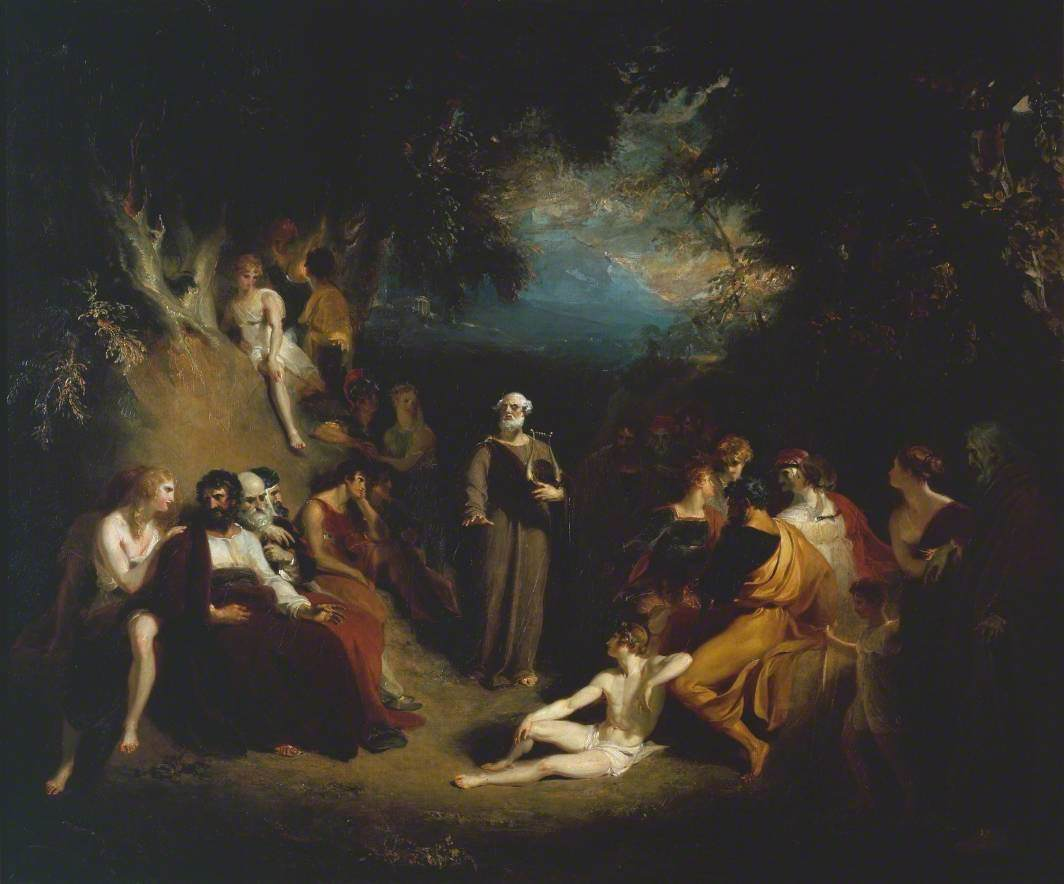
Homer Reciting his Poems by Thomas Lawrence, 1790

In antiquity, the Greeks applied the Iliad and the Odyssey as the bases of pedagogy. Literature was central to the educational-cultural function of the itinerant rhapsode, who composed consistent epic poems from memory and improvisation and disseminated them, via song and chant, in his travels and at the Panathenaic Festival of athletics, music, poetics, and sacrifice, celebrating Athena's birthday.

Originally, Classical scholars treated the Iliad and the Odyssey as written poetry, and Homer as a writer, yet by the 1920s, Milman Parry (1902–1935) had launched a movement claiming otherwise. His investigation of the oral Homeric style – "stock epithets" and "reiteration" (words, phrases, stanzas) – established that these formulae were artifacts of oral tradition easily applied to a hexametric line. A two-word stock epithet (e.g., "resourceful Odysseus") reiteration may complement a character name by filling a half-line, thus freeing the poet to compose a half-line of "original" formulaic text to complete his meaning. In Yugoslavia, Parry and his assistant, Albert Lord (1912–1991), studied the oral-formulaic composition of Serbian oral poetry, yielding the Parry/Lord thesis that established oral tradition studies, later developed by Eric Havelock, Marshall McLuhan, Walter Ong, and Gregory Nagy.

In The Singer of Tales (1960), Lord presents likenesses between the tragedies of the Achaean Patroclus in the Iliad and the Sumerian Enkidu in the Epic of Gilgamesh and claims to refute, with "careful analysis of the repetition of thematic patterns", that the Patroclus storyline upsets Homer's established compositional formulae of "wrath, bride-stealing, and rescue"; thus, stock-phrase reiteration does not restrict his originality in fitting story to rhyme. Likewise, James Armstrong (1958) reports that the poem's formulae yield richer meaning because the "arming motif" diction – describing Achilles, Agamemnon, Paris, and Patroclus – serves to "heighten the importance of […] an impressive moment"; thus, "[reiteration] creates an atmosphere of smoothness" wherein Homer distinguishes Patroclus from Achilles and foreshadows the former's death with positive and negative turns of phrase.

In the Iliad, occasional syntactic inconsistency may be an oral tradition effect—for example, Aphrodite is "laughter-loving" despite being painfully wounded by Diomedes (Book V, 375); and the divine representations may mix Mycenaean and Greek Dark Age (c. 1150–800 BC) mythologies, parallelling the hereditary basileis nobles (lower social rank rulers) with minor deities, such as Scamander, et al.

== Depiction of warfare ==
=== Depiction of infantry combat ===
Despite Mycenae and Troy being maritime powers, the Iliad features no sea battles. The Trojan shipwright (of the ship that transported Helen to Troy), Phereclus, instead fights afoot, as an infantryman. The battle dress and armour of hero and soldier are well-described. They enter battle in chariots, launching javelins into the enemy formations, and then dismount – for hand-to-hand combat with yet more javelin throwing, rock throwing, and if necessary, hand-to-hand sword and shoulder-borne aspis (shield) fighting. Ajax the Greater, son of Telamon, sports a large, rectangular shield (Ancient Greek: σάκος, romanized: sakos) with which he protects himself and Teucer, his brother:

Ninth came Teucer, stretching his curved bow.
He stood beneath the shield of Ajax, son of Telamon.
As Ajax cautiously pulled his shield aside,
Teucer would peer out quickly, shoot off an arrow,
hit someone in the crowd, dropping that soldier
right where he stood, ending his life – then he'd duck back,
crouching down by Ajax, like a child beside its mother.
Ajax would then conceal him with his shining shield.

— Homer, Iliad 8.267–272, translated by Ian Johnston.

Ajax's cumbersome shield is more suitable for defence than for offence, while his cousin Achilles sports a large, rounded, octagonal shield that he successfully deploys along with his spear against the Trojans:

Just as a man constructs a wall for some high house,
using well-fitted stones to keep out forceful winds,
that's how close their helmets and bossed shields lined up,
shield pressing against shield, helmet against helmet
man against man. On the bright ridges of the helmets,
horsehair plumes touched when warriors moved their heads.
That's how close they were to one another.

— Homer, Iliad 16.213–217 (translated by Ian Johnston).

In describing infantry combat, Homer names the phalanx formation, but most scholars do not believe the historical Trojan War was so fought. In the Bronze Age, the chariot was the main battle transport-weapon (e.g. the Battle of Kadesh). The available evidence, from the Dendra armour and the Pylos Palace paintings, indicate the Mycenaeans used two-man chariots, with a long-spear-armed principal rider, unlike the three-man Hittite chariots with short-spear-armed riders and the arrow-armed Egyptian and Assyrian two-man chariots. Nestor spearheads his troops with chariots; he advises them:

In your eagerness to engage the Trojans,
don't any of you charge ahead of others,
trusting in your strength and horsemanship.
And don't lag behind. That will hurt our charge.
Any man whose chariot confronts an enemy's
should thrust with his spear at him from there.
That's the most effective tactic, the way
men wiped out city strongholds long ago –
their chests full of that style and spirit.

— Homer, Iliad 4.301–309 (translated by Ian Johnston).

Although Homer's depictions are graphic, it can be seen in the very end that Achilles' victory is a far more somber occasion, where all that is lost becomes apparent. On the other hand, the funeral games are lively, for the dead's life and glory are celebrated. The somber depiction of war runs contrary to the common ancient Greek belief, where war is an aspiration for Kleos.

=== Modern reconstructions of armour, weapons, and styles ===
Few modern (archeologically, historically, and Homerically accurate) reconstructions of arms, armor, and motifs as described by Homer exist. Some historical reconstructions have been done by Salimbeti et al.

=== Influence on classical Greek warfare ===
While the Homeric poems (particularly, the Iliad) were not necessarily revered scripture of the ancient Greeks, they were most certainly seen as guides that were important to the intellectual understanding of any educated Greek citizen. This is evidenced by the fact that in the late 5th century BC, "it was the sign of a man of standing to be able to recite the Iliad and Odyssey by heart." Moreover, it can be argued that the warfare shown in the Iliad, and the way it is depicted, had a profound and very traceable effect on Greek warfare in general. In particular, the effect of epic literature can be broken down into three categories: tactics, ideology, and the mindset of commanders. In order to discern these effects, it is necessary to take a look at a few examples from each of these categories.

Much of the detailed fighting in the Iliad is done by the heroes in an orderly, one-on-one fashion. Much like the Odyssey, there is even a set ritual that must be observed in each of these conflicts. For example, a major hero may encounter a lesser hero from the opposing side, in which case the minor hero is introduced, threats may be exchanged, and then the minor hero is slain. The victor often strips the body of its armor and military accoutrements. Here is an example of this ritual and this type of one-on-one combat in the Iliad:

There Telamonian Ajax struck down the son of Anthemion,
Simoeisios in his stripling's beauty, whom once his mother
descending from Ida bore beside the banks of Simoeis
when she had followed her father and mother to tend the
sheepflocks.

Therefore they called him Simoeisios; but he could not
render again the care of his dear parents; he was short-lived,
beaten down beneath the spear of high-hearted Ajax,
who struck him as he first came forward beside the nipple
of the right breast, and the bronze spearhead drove clean
through the shoulder.

— Homer, Iliad 4.473–483 Lattimore (1951), pp. 125–126.

The most important question in reconciling the connection between the epic fighting of the Iliad and later Greek warfare concerns the phalanx, or hoplite, warfare seen in Greek history well after Homer's Iliad. While there are discussions of soldiers arrayed in semblances of the phalanx throughout the Iliad, the focus of the poem on the heroic fighting, as mentioned above, would seem to contradict the tactics of the phalanx. However, the phalanx did have its heroic aspects. The masculine one-on-one fighting of the epic is manifested in phalanx fighting with the emphasis on holding one's position in formation. This replaces the singular heroic competition found in the Iliad.

One example of this is the Spartan tale of 300 picked men fighting against 300 picked Argives. In this battle of champions, only two men are left standing for the Argives and one for the Spartans. Othryades, the remaining Spartan, goes back to stand in his formation with mortal wounds while the remaining two Argives go back to Argos to report their victory. Thus, the Spartans claimed this as a victory, as their last man displayed the ultimate feat of bravery by maintaining his position in the phalanx.

In terms of the ideology of commanders in later Greek history, the Iliad has an interesting effect. The Iliad expresses a definite disdain for tactical trickery when Hector says, before he challenges the great Ajax:

I know how to storm my way into the struggle of flying horses; I know how to tread the measures on the grim floor of the war god. Yet great as you are I would not strike you by stealth, watching for my chance, but openly, so, if perhaps I might hit you.

— Homer, Iliad 7.237–243 Lattimore (1951), p. 174.

However, despite examples of disdain for this tactical trickery, there is reason to believe that the Iliad, as well as later Greek warfare, endorses tactical genius on the part of its commanders. For example, there are multiple passages in the Iliad with commanders such as Agamemnon or Nestor discussing the arraying of troops so as to gain an advantage. Indeed, the Trojan War is won by a notorious example of Achaean guile in the Trojan Horse. This is even later referred to by Homer in the Odyssey. The connection, in this case, between the guileful tactics of the Achaeans and the Trojans in the Iliad and those of the later Greeks is not a difficult one to find. Spartan commanders, often seen as the pinnacle of Greek military prowess, were known for their tactical trickery, and for them, this was a feat to be desired in a commander. Indeed, this type of leadership was the standard advice of Greek tactical writers.

Ultimately, while Homeric (or epic) fighting is certainly not completely replicated in later Greek warfare, many of its ideals, tactics, and instructions are.

Hans van Wees argues that the descriptions of warfare related in the epic can be pinned down fairly specifically – to the first half of the 7th century BC.

== Influence on arts and culture ==
The Iliad, in addition to the Odyssey, became foundational school texts in classical Athens. Both texts were, by the end of the fifth century BC, widely known in the ancient Greek world. According to classicist Gregory Nagy, "Homer's Iliad, along with its companion-piece, the Odyssey, was venerated by the ancient Greeks themselves as the cornerstone of their civilization". According to literary scholar James Boyd White, "the Iliad at once defines a culture and subjects it to a set of fundamental criticisms".

The Iliad was a popular work in classical Greece and remained so throughout the Hellenistic, Roman, and Byzantine periods. It is generally believed by most scholars to have "existed in some form by the mid-seventh century B.C.", although no explicit references to the Iliad from 650 to 550 BC survive and most references were in the form of literary allusions. The Iliad grew in popularity in the fifth century BC, although there is little evidence to suggest that it and the Odyssey had achieved at this time a status as canonical "Homeric" texts. By 14–235 AD, "Homer's influence permeate[d] every corner of the Roman empire", and the Iliad was "personified in sculptural form".

Subjects from the Trojan War were a favourite among ancient Greek dramatists. Aeschylus' trilogy, the Oresteia, comprising Agamemnon, The Libation Bearers, and The Eumenides, follows the story of Agamemnon after his return from the war.

Publius Baebius Italicus, a Roman Senator, is credited with a shortened Latin version of the Iliad in c. 54–65 CE. The work is known as the Ilias Latina or Homerus Latinus and was formerly attributed to Pindarus Thebaeus. While the original Greek text of the Iliad itself was not commonly perused in the West during the Middle Ages, the Ilias Latina was very widely studied and read as a basic school text. In addition, the West tended to view Homer as unreliable, as they believed they possessed much more down-to-earth and realistic eyewitness accounts of the Trojan War written by Dares and Dictys Cretensis, who were supposedly present at the events. These late antique forged accounts formed the basis of several eminently popular medieval chivalric romances, most notably those of Benoît de Sainte-Maure and Guido delle Colonne. These in turn spawned many others in various European languages, such as the first printed English book, the 1473 Recuyell of the Historyes of Troye. Other accounts read in the Middle Ages were antique Latin retellings such as the Excidium Troiae and works in the vernaculars such as the Icelandic Troy Saga. Even without Homer, the Trojan War story had remained central to Western European medieval literary culture and its sense of identity. Most nations and several royal houses traced their origins to heroes at the Trojan War; e.g., Britain was supposedly settled by the Trojan Brutus.

An earlier Latin translation of the Iliad in hexameters was produced by Matius, of which some fragments remain.

Homer again came to be of great influence in European culture with the resurgence of interest in Greek antiquity during the Renaissance, and it remains the first and most influential work of the Western canon. In its full form, the text made its return to Italy and Western Europe beginning in the 15th century, primarily through translations into Latin and the vernacular languages.

According to Suleyman al-Boustani, a 19th-century poet who made the first translation of the Iliad to Arabic, the epic may have been widely circulated in Syriac and Pahlavi translations during the early Middle Ages. Al-Boustani credits Theophilus of Edessa with the Syriac translation, which was supposedly (along with the Greek original) widely read or heard by the scholars of Baghdad in the heyday of the Abbasid Caliphate, although those scholars never took the effort to translate it to the official language of the empire: Arabic. The Iliad was also the first full epic poem to be translated into Arabic from a foreign language, upon the publication of Al-Boustani's complete work in 1904.

=== English ===
- William Shakespeare used the plot of the Iliad as source material for his play Troilus and Cressida but focused on a medieval legend, the love story of Troilus, son of King Priam of Troy, and Cressida, daughter of the Trojan soothsayer Calchas. The play, often considered to be a comedy, reverses traditional views on events of the Trojan War and depicts Achilles as a coward, Ajax as a dull, unthinking mercenary, etc.
- William Theed the elder made a bronze statue of Thetis as she brings Achilles his new armor forged by Hephaestus. It has been on display in the Metropolitan Museum of Art in New York City since 2013.
- Robert Browning's poem Development discusses his childhood introduction to the matter of the Iliad and his delight in the epic, as well as contemporary debates about its authorship.

=== 20th-century arts ===
- Lesya Ukrainka wrote the dramatic poem "Cassandra" in 1901–1907 based on the Iliad. It describes the story of Cassandra, a prophetess.
- The fall of Troy (1911), an Italian silent film by Giovanni Pastrone, the first known movie adaptation of Homer's epic poem.
- "Achilles in the Trench" is one of the best-known of the war poems of the First World War and was written by Patrick Shaw-Stewart while waiting to be sent to fight at Gallipoli.
- The Private Life of Helen of Troy (1925), a book written by John Erskine which centres on Helen's afterlife in Sparta at the time Hermione is approaching marriage. Its dialogue is ironic and Helen is characterised as clever conversationalist able to self-analyse.
- The Private Life of Helen of Troy (1927), a silent comedy film directed by Alexander Korda. Though advertised as an adaptation of Erskine's novel, it shares little in common with it and is instead set during the build-up to the Trojan War, though its tone and the characterisation of its protagonists are similar.
- The Queen of Sparta (1931), a low-budget 80 minute epic film produced in Hollywood by an Italian company which serves as a loose adaptation of the Iliad.
- Simone Weil wrote the essay "The Iliad or the Poem of Force" in 1939, shortly after the commencement of World War II. The essay describes how the Iliad demonstrates the way force, exercised to the extreme in war, reduces both victim and aggressor to the level of the slave and the unthinking automaton.
- The 1954 Broadway musical The Golden Apple, by librettist John Treville Latouche and composer Jerome Moross, was freely adapted from the Iliad and the Odyssey, resetting the action to America's Washington state in the years after the Spanish–American War, with events inspired by the Iliad in Act One and events inspired by the Odyssey in Act Two.
- Helen of Troy (1956), a film directed by Robert Wise which stresses Helen's innocence in the matter of her kidnapping.
- Christopher Logue's poem War Music, an "account", not a translation, of the Iliad, was begun in 1959 as a commission for radio. He continued working on it until his death in 2011. Described by Tom Holland as "one of the most remarkable works of post-war literature", it has been an influence on Kae Tempest and Alice Oswald, who says that it "unleashes a forgotten kind of theatrical energy into the world".
- The opera King Priam by Sir Michael Tippett (which received its premiere in 1962) is based loosely on the Iliad.
- The Fury of Achilles (1962), an Italian film directed by Marino Girolami, which focuses on Achilles. The English dubbed release is around twenty minutes shorter than the original version and omits the Trojan Horse scenes, ending after Achilles kills Hector.
- Christa Wolf's novel Cassandra (1983) is a critical engagement with the Iliad. Wolf's narrator is Cassandra, whose thoughts are heard at the moment just before her murder by Clytemnestra in Sparta. Wolf's narrator presents a feminist's view of the war, and of war in general. Cassandra's story is accompanied by four essays that Wolf delivered at the 1982 Frankfurter Poetik-Vorlesungen. The essays present Wolf's concerns as a writer and rewriter of this canonical story and show the genesis of the novel through Wolf's own readings and a trip she took to Greece.
- David Melnick's Men in Aida (Ancient Greek: μῆνιν ἄειδε, romanized: mínin áeide, lit. 'The wrath sing') (1983) is a postmodern homophonic translation of Book One into a farcical bathhouse scenario, preserving the sounds but not the meaning of the original.
- Marion Zimmer Bradley's 1987 novel The Firebrand retells the story from the point of view of Kassandra, a princess of Troy and a prophetess who is cursed by Apollo.

=== Contemporary popular culture ===
- Eric Shanower's Image Comics series Age of Bronze, which began in 1998, retells the legend of the Trojan War.
- Dan Simmons's epic science fiction adaptation/tribute Ilium was released in 2003, receiving a Locus Award for best science fiction novel of 2003.
- Helen of Troy (2003), a TV miniseries told from the perspective of Menelaus which focuses on how Helen affected others around her, leaving the larger Trojan War as a background event.
- Troy (2004), a loose film adaptation of the Iliad, received mixed reviews, only grossing $133 million in the United States on a $185 million budget. Internationally, it was a commercial success, grossing $497 million worldwide.
- The Rage of Achilles (2009), by American author and Yale Writers' Conference founder Terence Hawkins, recounts the Iliad as a novel in modern, sometimes graphic language. Informed by Julian Jaynes's theory of the bicameral mind and the historicity of the Trojan War, it depicts its characters as real men to whom the gods appear only as hallucinations or command voices during the sudden and painful transition to truly modern consciousness.
- Lisa Peterson and Denis O'Hare developed a 100-minute one-person play, An Iliad, based on Robert Fagles' translation, for New York Theatre Workshop. It premiered in 2010 at the Seattle Repertory Theatre and was performed in the same year by McCarter Theatre, Princeton, New Jersey, before opening in New York in 2012. David Wenham starred in the play in 2026 for the Sydney Theatre Company.
- Alice Oswald's sixth collection, Memorial (2011), is based on but departs from the narrative form of the Iliad to focus on, and so commemorate, the individually named characters whose deaths are mentioned in that poem. In October 2011, Memorial was short-listed for the T. S. Eliot Prize, but in December 2011, Oswald withdrew the book from the shortlist, citing concerns about the ethics of the prize's sponsors.
- Madeline Miller's 2011 debut novel, The Song of Achilles, tells the story of Achilles and Patroclus's life together as children, lovers, and soldiers. The novel, which won the 2012 Women's Prize for Fiction, draws on the Iliad as well as the works of other classical authors such as Statius, Ovid, and Virgil.
- For the Most Beautiful, written by classicist and historian Emily Hauser in 2016, narrates the lives of Chryseis and Briseis in their own words.
- Natalie Haynes's 2019 novel A Thousand Ships narrates the consequences of the Fall of Troy through the eyes and words of the women involved. It was shortlisted for the Women's Prize for Fiction 2020.
- As part of his continuing literary interest in classical myths, Stephen Fry published Troy in 2020. The book has become popular as a more accessible way to read the Greek myths.
- Pat Barker's published The Silence of the Girls and The Women of Troy in 2018 and 2021 respectively. Retelling the silenced voices of women in the Iliad, both books were critically acclaimed, with The Silence of the Girls being named one of "The Guardian Best Books of the 21st Century".

=== Sciences ===
- Psychiatrist Jonathan Shay wrote two books, Achilles in Vietnam: Combat Trauma and the Undoing of Character (1994) and Odysseus in America: Combat Trauma and the Trials of Homecoming (2002), which relate the Iliad and the Odyssey to posttraumatic stress disorder and moral injury as seen in the rehabilitation histories of combat veteran patients.

== Gender ==
The depiction of women by ancient Greek culture, Homer, and translators has become a common subject of study. The story depicts women mainly as valuable property, and competition over them is the cause of strife: Helen is the cause of the war, and the slaves Briseis and Chryseis cause the conflict between Achilles and Agamemnon.

The Iliad is a frequent subject of retellings from the point of view of an oppressed female character. The Trojan War has become the most popular setting for reexamining gender in the ancient world. East German author Christa Wolfe retells the story from the point of view of Cassandra in her 1983 novel, and Pat Barker retells it from Briseis's perspective. The retellings often question masculine ideals and examine violence against women in war. Starting in the mid-2000s, retelling ancient myths from a female character's perspective became a popular sub-genre.

Different translations also depict women differently. In book three, line 180, Helen is berating herself to her father-in-law Priam. The Greek is δαὴρ αὖτ᾽ ἐμὸς ἔσκε κυνώπιδος, εἴ ποτ᾽ ἔην γε. It contains a term that literally means "dog-faced," which three male translators of the Iliad translated with misogynistic slang:

- Lattimore: "Once my kinsman, slut that I am. Did this ever happen?"
- Fagles: "…and he used to be my kinsman, whore that I am! There was a world … or was it all a dream?"
- Rieu: "…my brother-in-law once, slut that I am – unless all that was a dream."

In contrast, two more recent translations, both by women, are more literal and consistent across genders:

- Alexander (2015): "He was my brother-in-law, dog-faced as I am—if that ever happened."
- Wilson (2023): "…his brother, the former husband of my dog-face self—if any of these things took place at all."

Discussing the earlier translations, Wilson noted that the same Greek term is applied to a male character: "Unlike me, none of these translators use the same term when Achilles is insulting Agamemnon; Lattimore, for instance, has Achilles say, 'You with the dog's eyes,' not 'Agamemnon, you slut!'"

== English translations ==
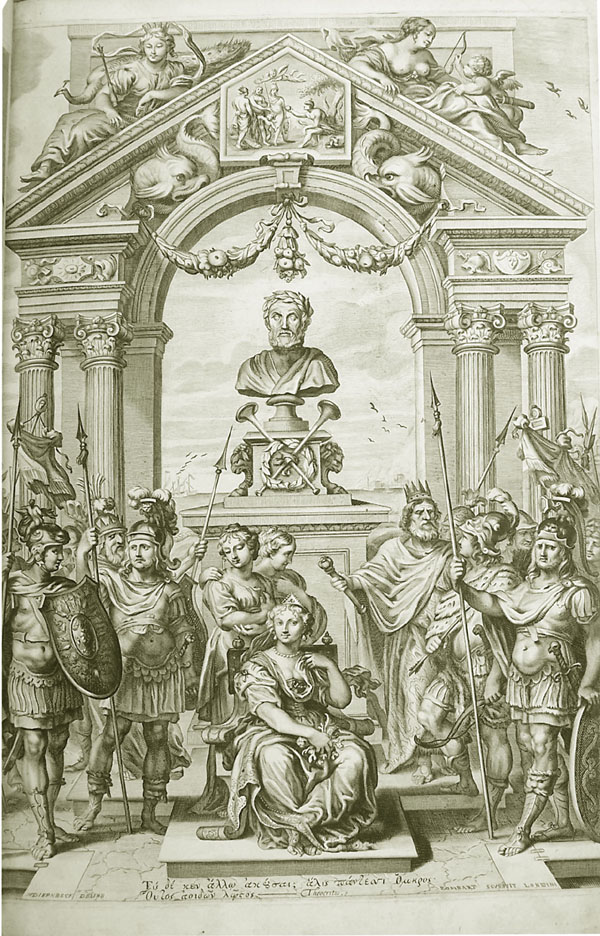
Wenceslas Hollar's engraved title page of a 1660 edition of the Iliad, translated by John Ogilby

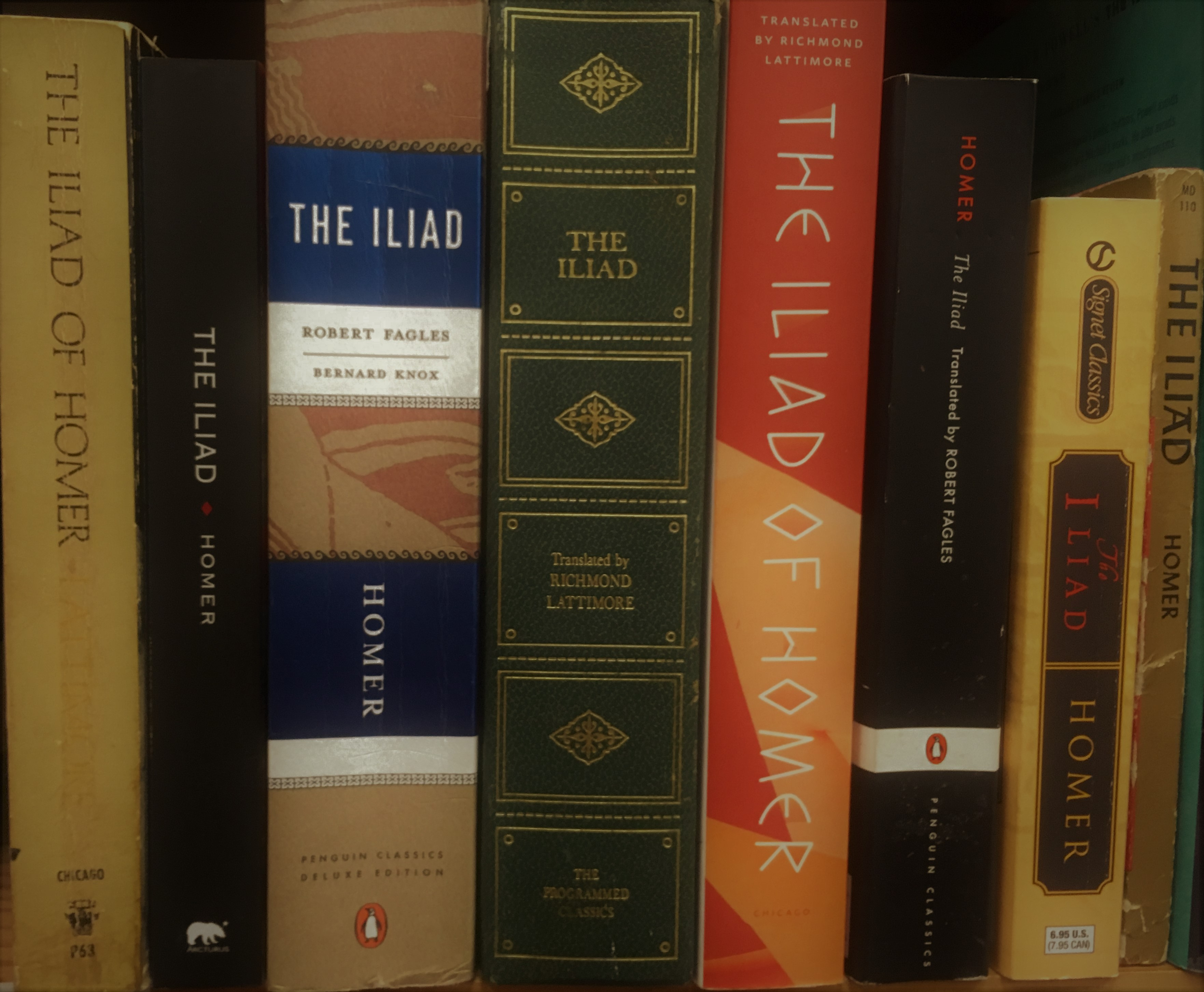
Sampling of translations and editions of Iliad in English

George Chapman published his translation of the Iliad, in installments beginning in 1598, published in "fourteeners", a long-line ballad metre that "has room for all of Homer's figures of speech and plenty of new ones, as well as explanations in parentheses. At its best, as in Achilles's rejection of the embassy in Iliad Nine; it has great rhetorical power." It quickly established itself as a classic in English poetry. In the preface to his own translation, Pope praises "the daring fiery spirit" of Chapman's rendering, which is "something like what one might imagine Homer, himself, would have writ before he arrived at years of discretion".

John Keats praised Chapman in the sonnet On First Looking into Chapman's Homer (1816). John Ogilby's mid-17th-century translation is among the early annotated editions; Alexander Pope's 1715 translation, in heroic couplet, is "the classic translation that was built on all the preceding versions" and like Chapman's, is a major poetic work in its own right. William Cowper's Miltonic, blank verse 1791 edition is highly regarded for its greater fidelity to the Greek than either the Chapman or the Pope versions: "I have omitted nothing; I have invented nothing", Cowper says in prefacing his translation.

In the lectures On Translating Homer (1861), Matthew Arnold addresses the matters of translation and interpretation in rendering the Iliad to English; commenting upon the versions contemporarily available in 1861, he identifies the four essential poetic qualities of Homer to which the translator must do justice:

[i] that he is eminently rapid; [ii] that he is eminently plain and direct, both in the evolution of his thought and in the expression of it, that is, both in his syntax and in his words; [iii] that he is eminently plain and direct in the substance of his thought, that is, in his matter and ideas; and, finally, [iv] that he is eminently noble.

After a discussion of the metres employed by previous translators, Arnold argues for a poetical dialect hexameter translation of the Iliad, like the original. "Laborious as this meter was, there were at least half a dozen attempts to translate the entire Iliad or Odyssey in hexameters; the last in 1945. Perhaps the most fluent of them was by J. Henry Dart [1862] in response to Arnold." In 1870, the American poet William Cullen Bryant published a blank verse version, that Van Wyck Brooks describes as "simple, faithful".

An 1898 translation by Samuel Butler was published by Longmans. Butler had read Classics at Cambridge University, graduating in 1859.

Since 1950, there have been several English translations:

- Richmond Lattimore's version (1951) is "a free six-beat" line-for-line rendering in often unidiomatic, often archaic English. Robert Fitzgerald's version (Oxford World's Classics, 1974) uses shorter, mostly iambic lines and numerous allusions to earlier English poetry.
- Robert Fagles (Penguin Classics, 1990) and Stanley Lombardo (1997) are bolder than Lattimore in adding more contemporary American-English idioms to convey Homer's conventional and formulaic language. Rodney Merrill's translation (University of Michigan Press, 2007) renders the work in English verse like the dactylic hexameter of the original.
- Stephen Mitchell's 2011 translation of the Iliad draws upon the original Greek text to present a modernized English version, which includes a detailed introduction.
- Peter Green translated the Iliad in 2015, a version published by the University of California Press.
- Caroline Alexander published the first full-length English translation by a woman in 2015.
- Emily Wilson's 2023 translation uses unrhymed iambic pentameters.

== Manuscripts ==
There are more than 2000 manuscripts of Homer. Some notable manuscripts include:

- Rom. Bibl. Nat. gr. 6 + Matriti. Bibl. Nat. 4626 from 870 to 890
- Venetus A = Venetus Marc, 822 from the 10th century
- Venetus B = Venetus Marc, 821 from the 11th century
- Ambrosian Iliad
- Papyrus Oxyrhynchus 20
- Papyrus Oxyrhynchus 21
- Codex Nitriensis (palimpsest)
- El Bahnasa area of Minya – Discovery of papyrus with text containing lines from Book Two of Homer's Iliad.

== See also ==
- Mask of Agamemnon
- Parallels between Virgil's Aeneid and Homer's Iliad and Odyssey
- Heinrich Schliemann
- English translations of Homer
- Greek mythology retellings
- Category:Works based on the Iliad
