= Papyrus Oxyrhynchus 230 =

Greek papyrus fragment

Papyrus Oxyrhynchus 230 (P. Oxy. 230 or P. Oxy. II 230) is a fragment of the De Corona by Demosthenes, written in Greek. It was discovered in Oxyrhynchus. The manuscript was written on papyrus in the form of a roll. It is dated to the second century. Currently, it is housed in the Milton S. Eisenhower Library of the Johns Hopkins University in Baltimore.

== Description ==
The document was written by an unknown copyist. It contains part of the text of the De Corona (40-47) by Demosthenes. The measurements of the fragment are 280 by 210 mm. The text is written in a round, rather irregular uncial hand. It occasionally differs from the ordinary text. Only a few corrections were made by a second hand, which is also responsible for some rough breathings. Grenfell and Hunt collated the text of the manuscript against the text of De Corona from Dindorf-Blass's edition.

It was discovered by Grenfell and Hunt in 1897 in Oxyrhynchus. The text was published by Grenfell and Hunt in 1899.

== See also ==
- Oxyrhynchus Papyri
- Papyrus Oxyrhynchus 25
- Papyrus Oxyrhynchus 229
- Papyrus Oxyrhynchus 231
