= Papyrus Oxyrhynchus 26 =

Greek papyrus fragment

Papyrus Oxyrhynchus 26 (P. Oxy. 26) is a fragment of Prooimia Demegorica (26-29) by Demosthenes, written in Greek. It was discovered by Grenfell and Hunt in 1897 in Oxyrhynchus. The fragment is dated to the second century. It is housed in the British Library (Department of Manuscripts). The text was published by Grenfell and Hunt in 1898.

The manuscript was written on papyrus in the form of a roll. The measurements of the fragment are 115 by 526 mm. The text on recto is written in a medium-sized uncial hand. There are occasional stops and marks, a few corrections were made in a later half-uncial hand. Grenfell and Hunt collated the text of the manuscript on the basis of the Dindor-Blass edition (1885).

== See also ==
- Oxyrhynchus Papyri
- Papyrus Oxyrhynchus 25
- Papyrus Oxyrhynchus 27
