= Papyrus Oxyrhynchus 20 =

Greek Papyrus recovered from ancient Greece

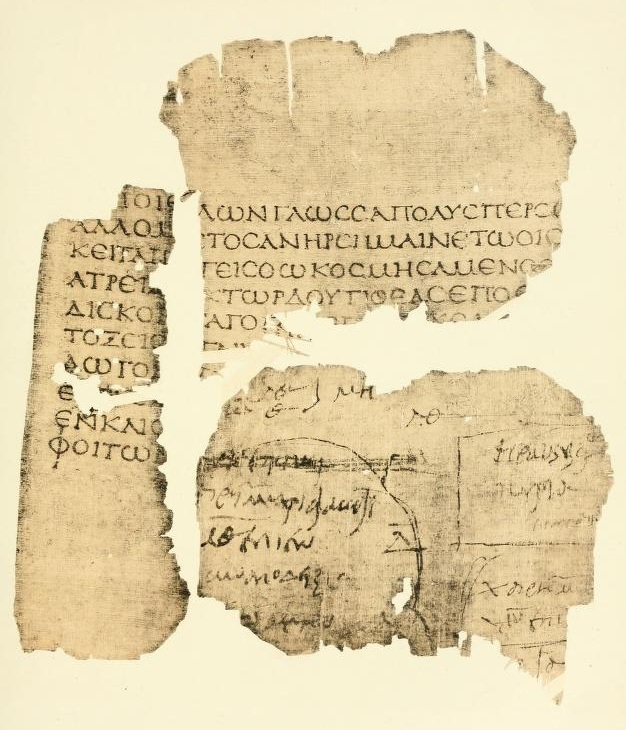
P. Oxy. 20, verso

Papyrus Oxyrhynchus 20 (P. Oxy. 20) consists of twelve fragments of the second book of the Iliad (Β, 730–828), written in Greek. It was discovered by Grenfell and Hunt in 1897 in Oxyrhynchus. The fragment is dated to the second century AD. It is housed in the British Library (Department of Manuscripts). The text was published by Grenfell and Hunt in 1898.

The manuscript was written on papyrus in the form of a roll. The measurements of the largest fragment are 145 by 80 mm. The text is written in a large upright calligraphic uncial hand. On the verso side are some accounts written in cursive script and dated to the late second or early third century. The Homeric text is probably earlier. There are no stops, rough breathings, or accents.

== See also ==
- Oxyrhynchus Papyri
- Papyrus Oxyrhynchus 21
