= Papyrus Oxyrhynchus 25 =

Greek papyrus fragment

Papyrus Oxyrhynchus 25 (P. Oxy. 25) is a fragment of Demosthenes' speech "On the Crown", written in Greek. It was discovered by Bernard Pyne Grenfell and Arthur Surridge Hunt in 1897 at Oxyrhynchus in Egypt, and first published by them in 1898.

The manuscript was written on papyrus in the form of a roll, and dates to the third century. It measures 95 by 80 mm, and contains 11 lines of text. The text is written in a large thick formal uncial hand. Accents, rough breathings, and marks were added by a corrector. The text on the fragment is identical to Karl Wilhelm Dindorf and Friedrich Blass' 1885 edition of Demosthenes.

It is housed in the Milton S. Eisenhower Library at Johns Hopkins University.

== See also ==
- Oxyrhynchus Papyri
- Papyrus Oxyrhynchus 24
- Papyrus Oxyrhynchus 26
- Papyrus Oxyrhynchus 230
