= Avest =

Avest Auste (Achterhoeks)
- Hamlet
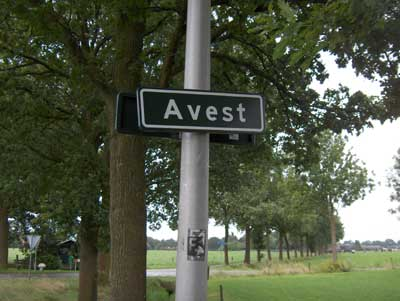
- Street sign of Avest

- Location in the province of Gelderland in the Netherlands Avest (Netherlands)
- Coordinates: 52°4′N 6°35′E
- Country: Netherlands
- Province: Gelderland
- Municipality: Berkelland
- Village: Beltrum
- Elevation: 20.4 m (67 ft)

Population (2020)
  - Total: c. 200
- Time zone: UTC+1 (CET)
  - Summer (DST): UTC+2 (CEST)
- Postcode: 7156
- Area code: 0544

Avest (Dutch: [ˈaːvəst]; Achterhoeks: Auste; also Aves, Oves) is a hamlet in the municipality of Berkelland in the province of Gelderland in the Netherlands. It is originally a hamlet that fell within the heerlijkheid of Borculo, the kerspel Groenlo and the voogdij of Beltrum. In 1552, Rosier van Bronckhorst was named as voogd of Eibergen, Neede, and Beltrum. From this voogdij, the municipality of Beltrum arose in the Batavian-French period, which was dissolved in 1819 and added to the municipality of Eibergen. Since January 1, 2005, Avest has been part of the municipality of Berkelland. The hamlet is located south of the Hupselse Beek. The Oude (Grolse) Beek runs through it. Part of the new regional industrial estate De Laarberg is located on land that once belonged to the marke of Avest.

== Etymology ==
The name Oves appeared in 1298, the name Avest in 1415, and in 1428 the name Aves. Oves is a variant of the Middle Dutch ovese, with short forms ose and oose. In the Achterhoeks, a Low Saxon dialect, the hamlet is called Auste.

This word also occurs in Old English, but there was also a variant epesis. From this, the English word "eaves" developed, which refers to a point of a thatched roof protruding beyond the wall. But the oldest meaning is "edge", for example, a forest edge, and this is a very acceptable explanation of the name Avest for yards that were located on the edge of the forest; although the meaning "covered shelter" is also plausible.

It was previously stated that Avest comes from a Germanic word, which was eowestre in Old English,awistr in 'Gothic, and ewist in Old High German; the meaning was "sheep shed" or an enclosed area where sheep were kept. It is derived from awi, which still survives in Dutch as ewe for a female sheep. The source this comes from, however, retracted its statement from the first explanation.

The name Oves was already noted in old accounts of the Duchy of Guelders in 1294.
