= Berkelland =

- Municipality
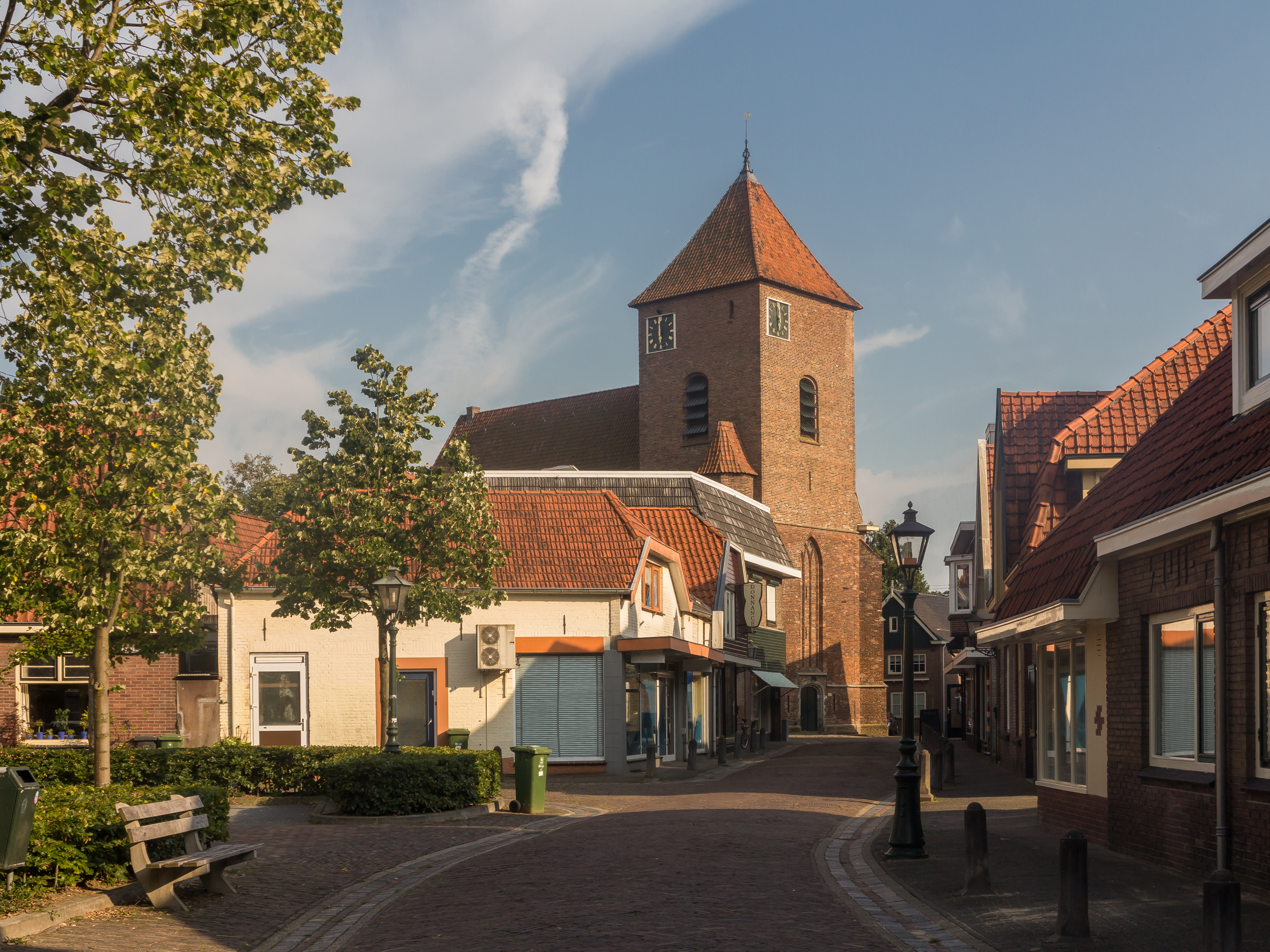
- Church in Borculo

- Flag Coat of arms

- Location in Gelderland
- Coordinates: 52°7′N 6°32′E
- Country: Netherlands
- Province: Gelderland
- Established: 1 January 2005

Government
  - Body: Municipal council
  - Mayor: Joost van Oostrum (VVD)

Area
  - Total: 260.21 km^{2} (100.47 sq mi)
  - Land: 258.06 km^{2} (99.64 sq mi)
  - Water: 2.15 km^{2} (0.83 sq mi)
- Elevation: 16 m (52 ft)
- Highest elevation: 35 m (115 ft)

Population (January 2021)
  - Total: 43,846
  - Density: 170/km^{2} (440/sq mi)
- Time zone: UTC+1 (CET)
  - Summer (DST): UTC+2 (CEST)
- Postcode: 7150–7165, 7260–7261, 7270–7275
- Area code: 0544, 0545, 0573
- Website: gemeenteberkelland.nl

Berkelland (Dutch pronunciation: [ˈbɛrkəlɑnt]) is a municipality in the Netherlands province of Gelderland. It was created on 1 January 2005 from the merger of the former municipalities of Borculo, Eibergen, Neede, and Ruurlo. The new municipality was named after the Berkel, a small river.

== Population centres ==
- Formerly part of Borculo: Borculo, Geesteren, Gelselaar, Haarlo.
- Formerly part of Eibergen: Avest, Beltrum, Eibergen, Holterhoek, Hupsel, Lintvelde, Loo, Mallem, Olden Eibergen, Rekken, Zwolle.
- Formerly part of Neede: Achterveld, Broeke, Hoonte, Lochuizen, Neede, Noordijk, Noordijkerveld, Rietmolen.
- Formerly part of Ruurlo: Brinkmanshoek, De Bruil, De Haar, Heurne, Mariënvelde, Ruurlo, Veldhoek.

=== Topography ===
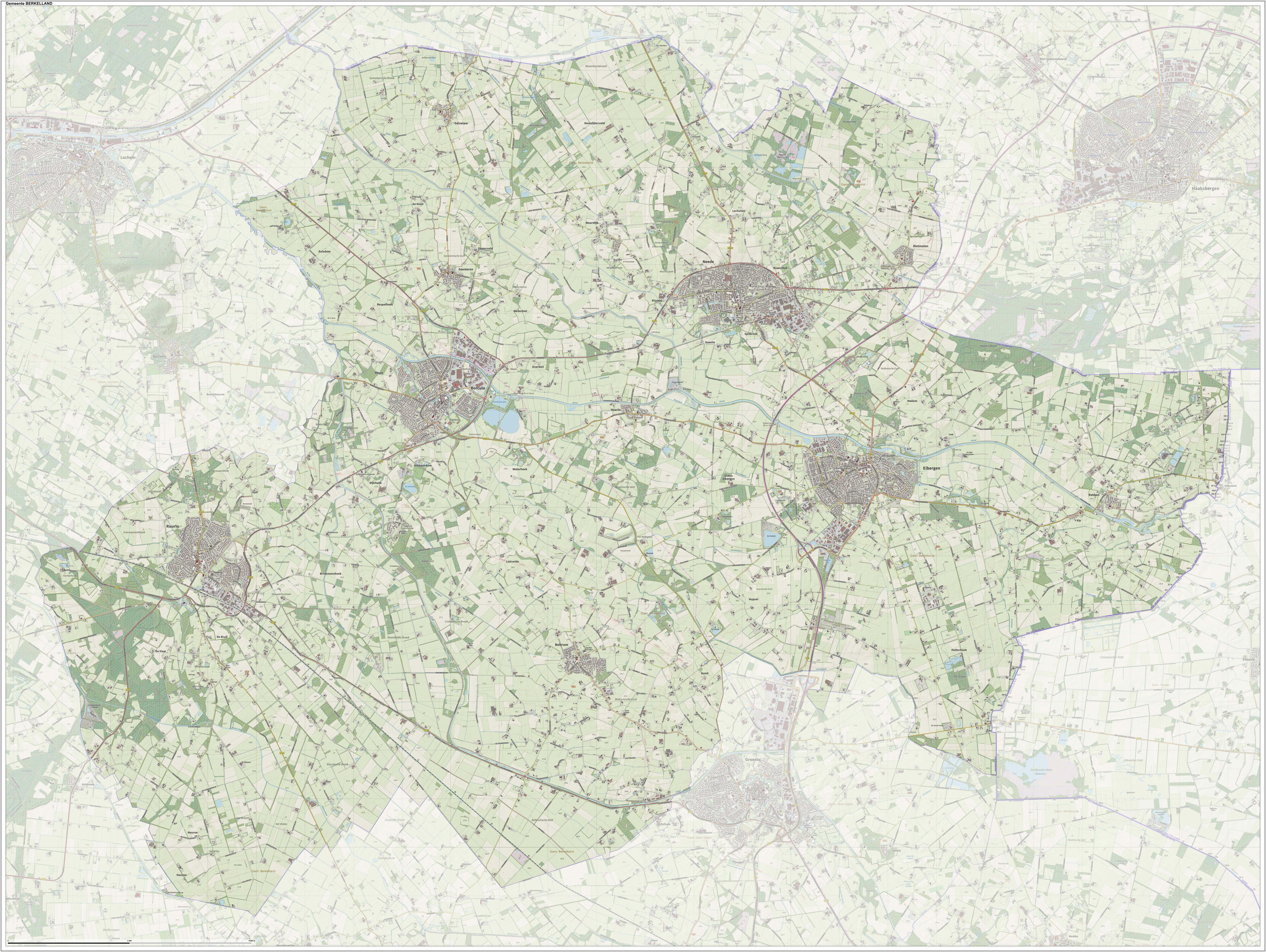

Dutch Topographic map of the municipality of Berkelland, June 2015.

== Government ==
The Eibergen community houses the interception station of the Nationale SIGINT Organisatie.

== Notable people ==
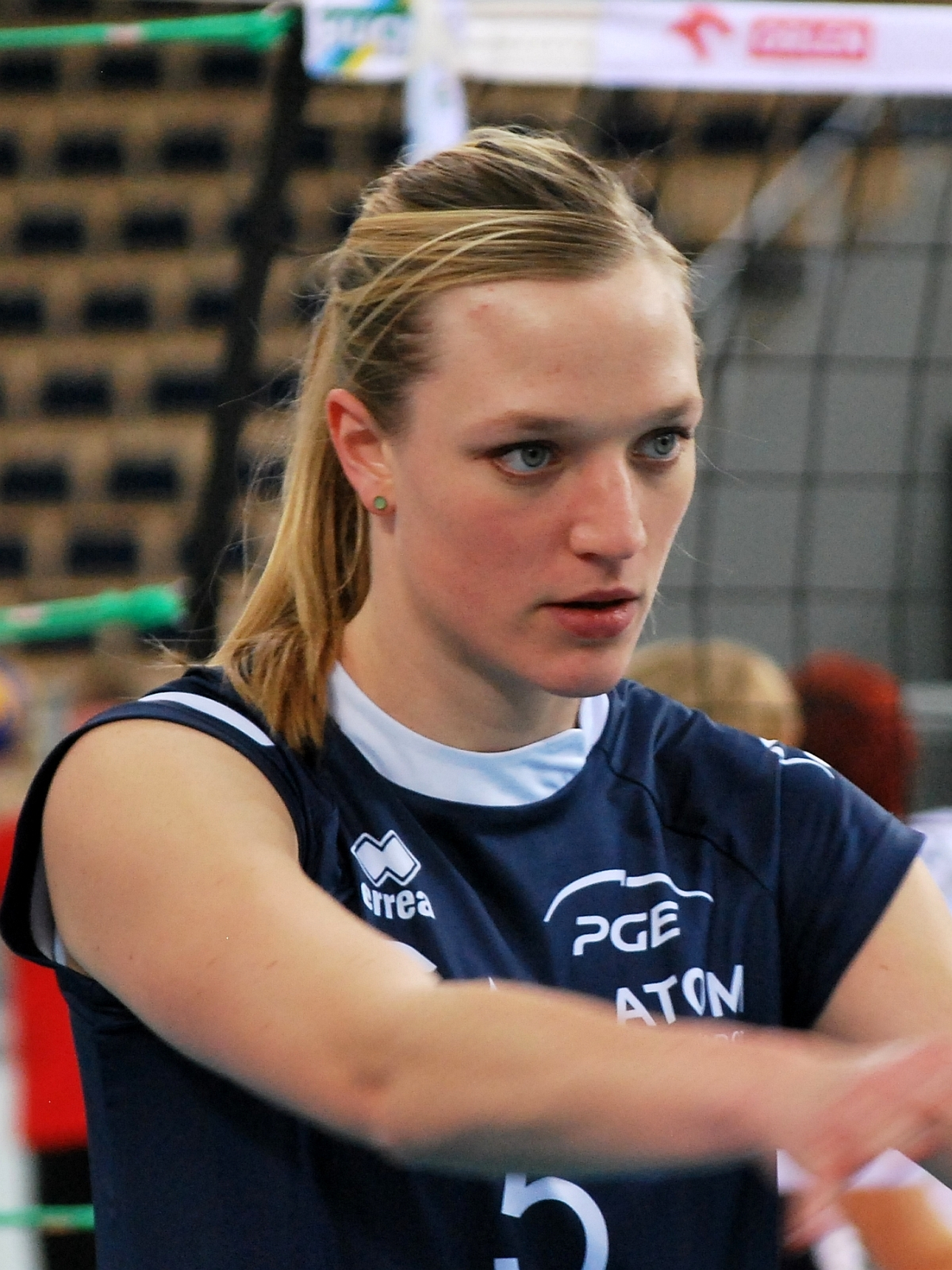
Judith Pietersen, 2013

- Jobst of Limburg (1560 in Borculo - 1621) Count of Limburg and Bronckhorst
- Menno ter Braak (1902 in Eibergen – 1940) a Dutch modernist author
- Annie Borckink (born 1951 in Hupsel) a former speed skater, gold medallist at the 1980 Winter Olympics
- Bert Teunissen (born 1959 in Ruurlo) a Dutch photographer, documents European homes built before WWII
- Astrid Bussink (born 1975 in Eibergen) a Dutch filmmaker
- Joris Laarman (born 1979 in Borculo) a Dutch designer, artist and entrepreneur, uses emerging technologies
- Judith Pietersen (born 1989 in Eibergen) a Dutch volleyball player, competed in the 2016 Summer Olympics

== Gallery ==
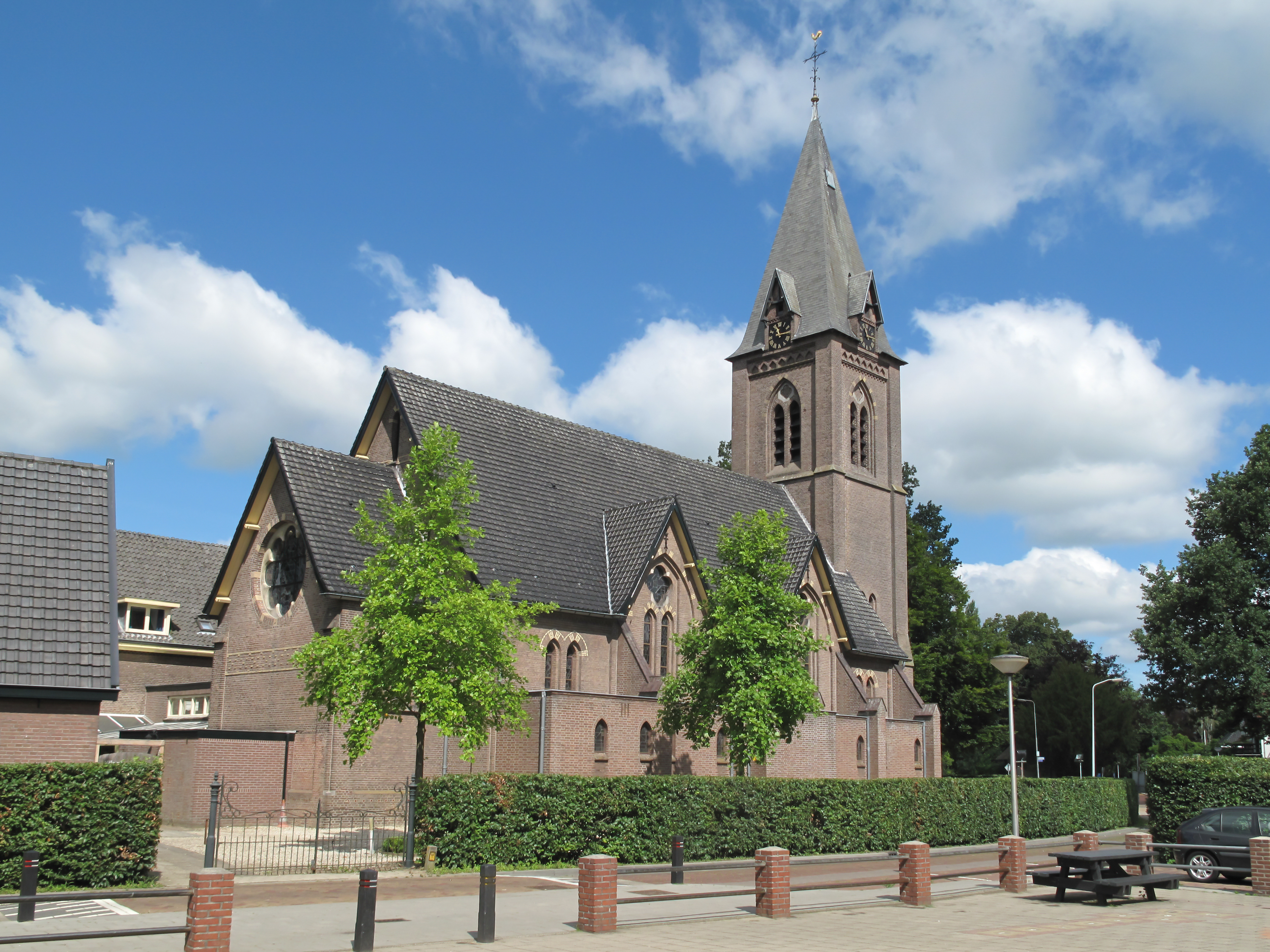
Ruurlo, de Sint Willibrorduskerk

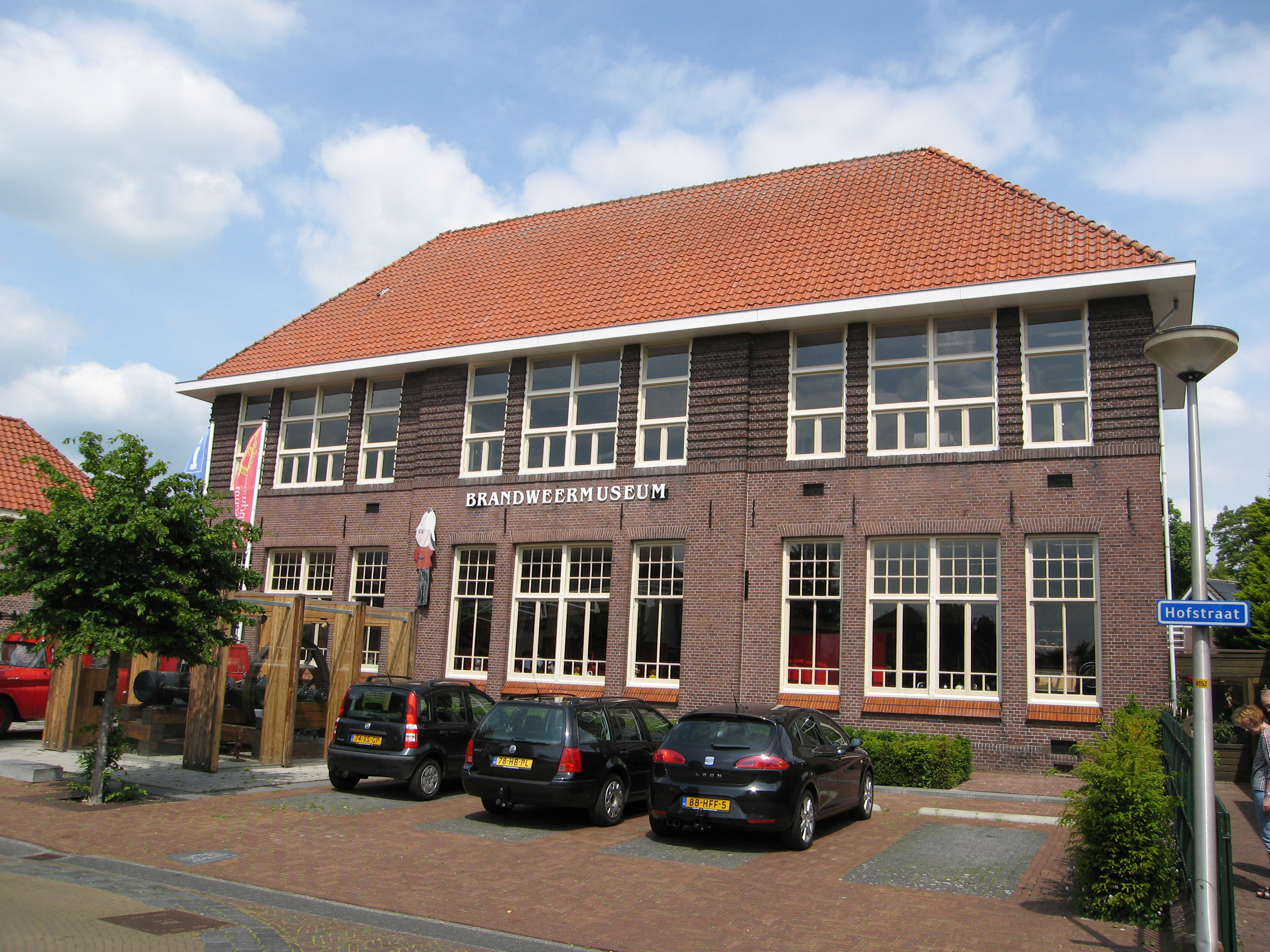
Borculo-hofstraat

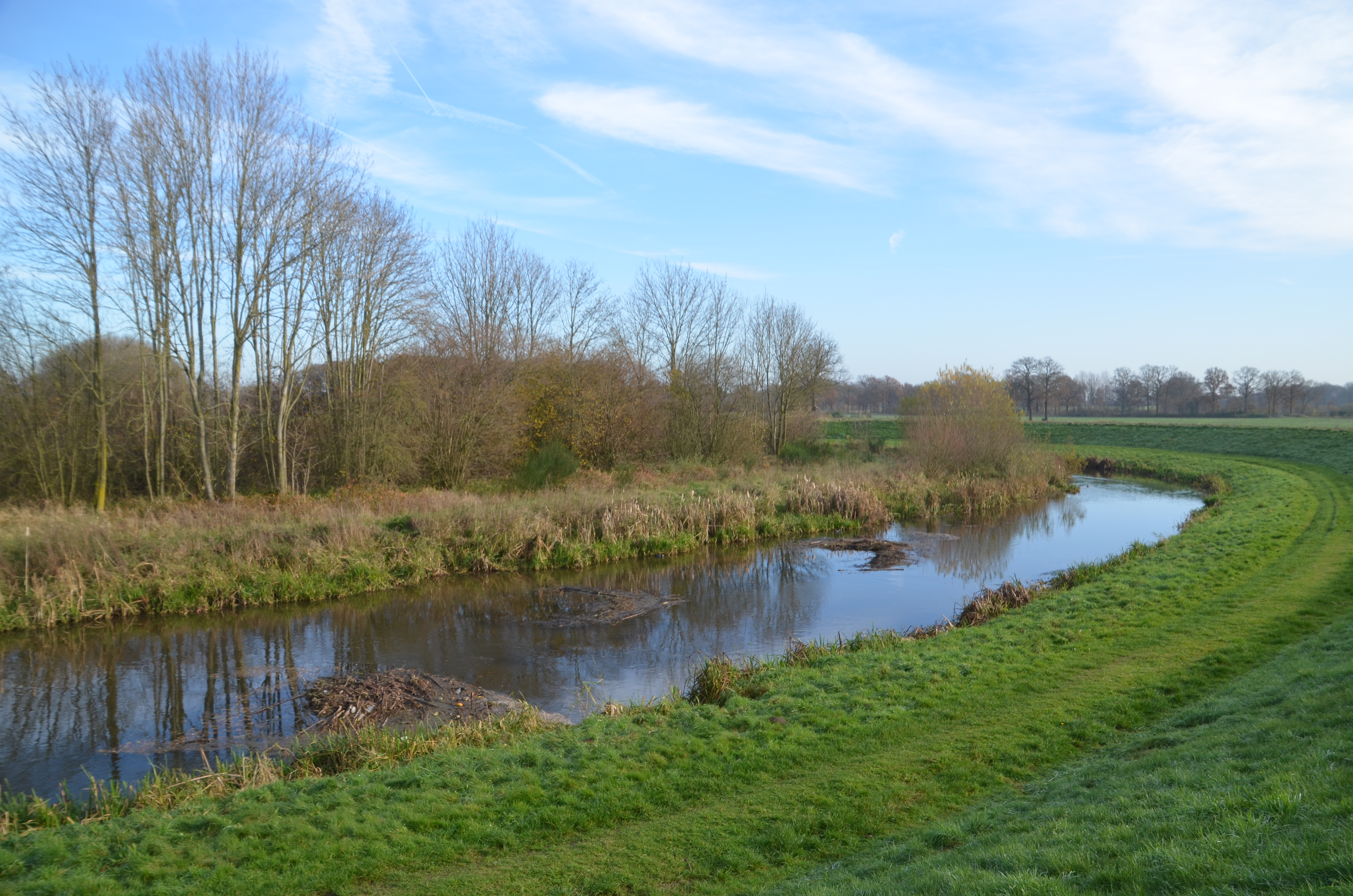
Bocht in de berkel

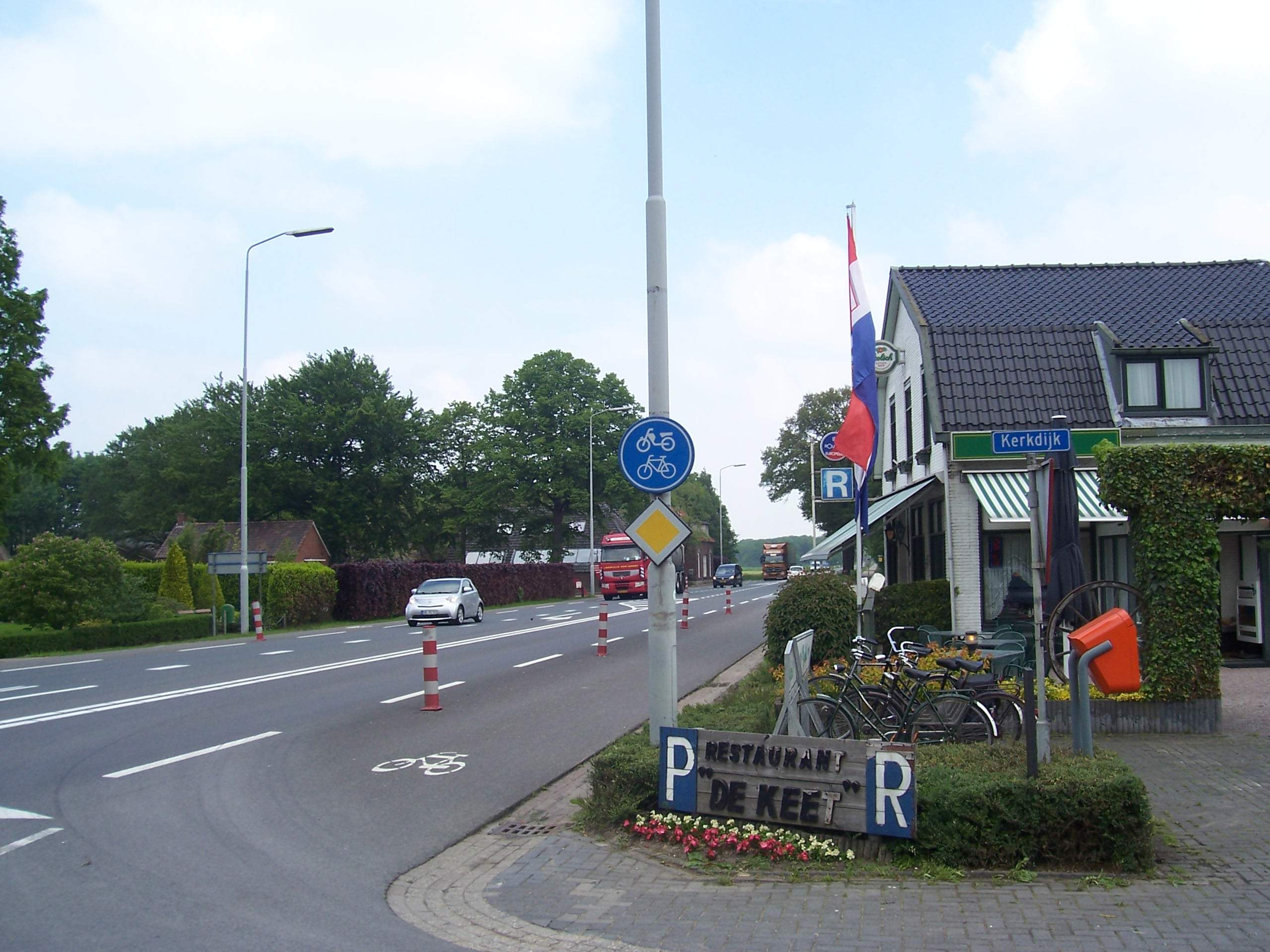
Hupsel, de Keet

== Climate ==
Climate data for Hupsel, Berkelland (1991−2020 normals, extremes 1989−present)
Month	Jan	Feb	Mar	Apr	May	Jun	Jul	Aug	Sep	Oct	Nov	Dec	Year
Record high °C (°F)	15.0 (59.0)	19.4 (66.9)	23.9 (75.0)	27.7 (81.9)	32.4 (90.3)	36.5 (97.7)	40.4 (104.7)	36.6 (97.9)	33.4 (92.1)	27.7 (81.9)	19.8 (67.6)	15.1 (59.2)	40.4 (104.7)
Mean daily maximum °C (°F)	5.3 (41.5)	6.4 (43.5)	10.1 (50.2)	14.8 (58.6)	18.7 (65.7)	21.4 (70.5)	23.5 (74.3)	23.1 (73.6)	19.3 (66.7)	14.4 (57.9)	9.3 (48.7)	5.9 (42.6)	14.4 (57.9)
Daily mean °C (°F)	2.8 (37.0)	3.2 (37.8)	5.9 (42.6)	9.4 (48.9)	13.3 (55.9)	16.2 (61.2)	18.1 (64.6)	17.6 (63.7)	14.3 (57.7)	10.4 (50.7)	6.4 (43.5)	3.6 (38.5)	10.1 (50.2)
Mean daily minimum °C (°F)	0.0 (32.0)	0.0 (32.0)	1.6 (34.9)	3.5 (38.3)	7.3 (45.1)	10.3 (50.5)	12.4 (54.3)	11.9 (53.4)	9.3 (48.7)	6.5 (43.7)	3.3 (37.9)	0.9 (33.6)	5.6 (42.1)
Record low °C (°F)	−19.6 (−3.3)	−19.3 (−2.7)	−17.5 (0.5)	−6.9 (19.6)	−2.4 (27.7)	−0.2 (31.6)	3.6 (38.5)	3.4 (38.1)	−0.8 (30.6)	−6.4 (20.5)	−8.5 (16.7)	−14.6 (5.7)	−19.6 (−3.3)
Average precipitation mm (inches)	67.1 (2.64)	55.7 (2.19)	55.3 (2.18)	40.3 (1.59)	55.4 (2.18)	64.2 (2.53)	80.5 (3.17)	84.8 (3.34)	67.1 (2.64)	64.7 (2.55)	63.6 (2.50)	76.3 (3.00)	775.0 (30.51)
Average relative humidity (%)	88.5	85.4	80.8	75.2	74.2	75.7	77.4	80.0	84.7	87.5	90.7	90.4	82.5
Mean monthly sunshine hours	63.6	89.6	140.0	189.3	213.6	206.5	212.8	194.0	154.4	119.4	71.4	54.6	1,709.2
Percentage possible sunshine	24.6	31.8	37.9	45.4	44.0	41.3	42.4	42.6	40.5	36.1	26.8	22.5	36.3
Source: Royal Netherlands Meteorological Institute
