= Teunissen =

Teunissen is a Dutch patronymic surname meaning "son of Teunis", a nickname for Anthonius. People with this surname include:

- Bert Teunissen (born 1959), Dutch photographer
- Bob Teunissen (born 1981), Dutch ice hockey player
- Christine Teunissen (born 1985), Dutch politician
- Jan Teunissen (1898–1975), Dutch film director
- Jo Teunissen-Waalboer (1919–1991), Dutch javelin thrower
- Mike Teunissen (born 1992), Dutch road cyclist and cyclo-cross racer
- Peter Teunissen (born 1957) Dutch geodesist

== See also ==
- Teunissen-Cremers syndrome, a genetic disorder
- Theunissen (surname)
