= Berkel =

River in Germany

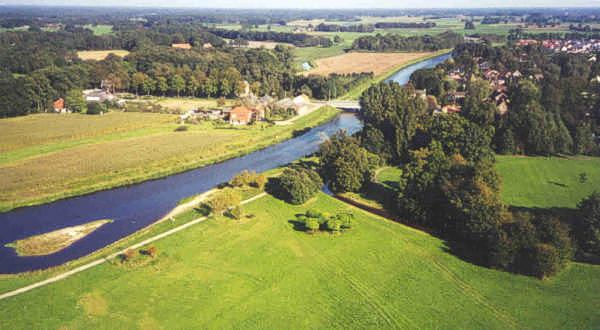
- The Berkel near Eibergen

Location
- Countries: Germany and Netherlands

Physical characteristics
- Source
  - location: Westphalia
- Mouth
  - location: IJssel
  - coordinates: 52°8′25″N 6°11′28″E
- Length: 114.6 km (71.2 mi)
- Basin size: 849 km^{2} (328 sq mi)

Basin features
- Progression: IJssel→ IJsselmeer

The Berkel (German pronunciation: [ˈbɛʁkl̩]) is a river in the Netherlands and Germany. It is a right tributary of the IJssel.

The river rises in Billerbeck, near the German city of Münster in North Rhine-Westphalia, and crosses the border with the Netherlands near Vreden (Germany) and Rekken (Netherlands). From there, it flows through the province of Gelderland to join the IJssel at Zutphen after about 115 kilometres.

Before the coming of the railway, the Berkel was a major shipping route for goods from Münster to Eibergen, Borculo, and Zutphen, transported in flat-bottomed boats called Berkelzompen. In the 1950s, the Dutch stretch of the river was channelized to prevent flooding and to improve drainage. Recently old bends have been reconnected to the straightened lengths of the river.

Towns along the course of the Berkel include:

- in Germany: Billerbeck, Coesfeld, Gescher, Stadtlohn, Vreden
- in the Netherlands: Eibergen, Borculo, Lochem, Almen, Warnsveld, Zutphen

== Gallery ==
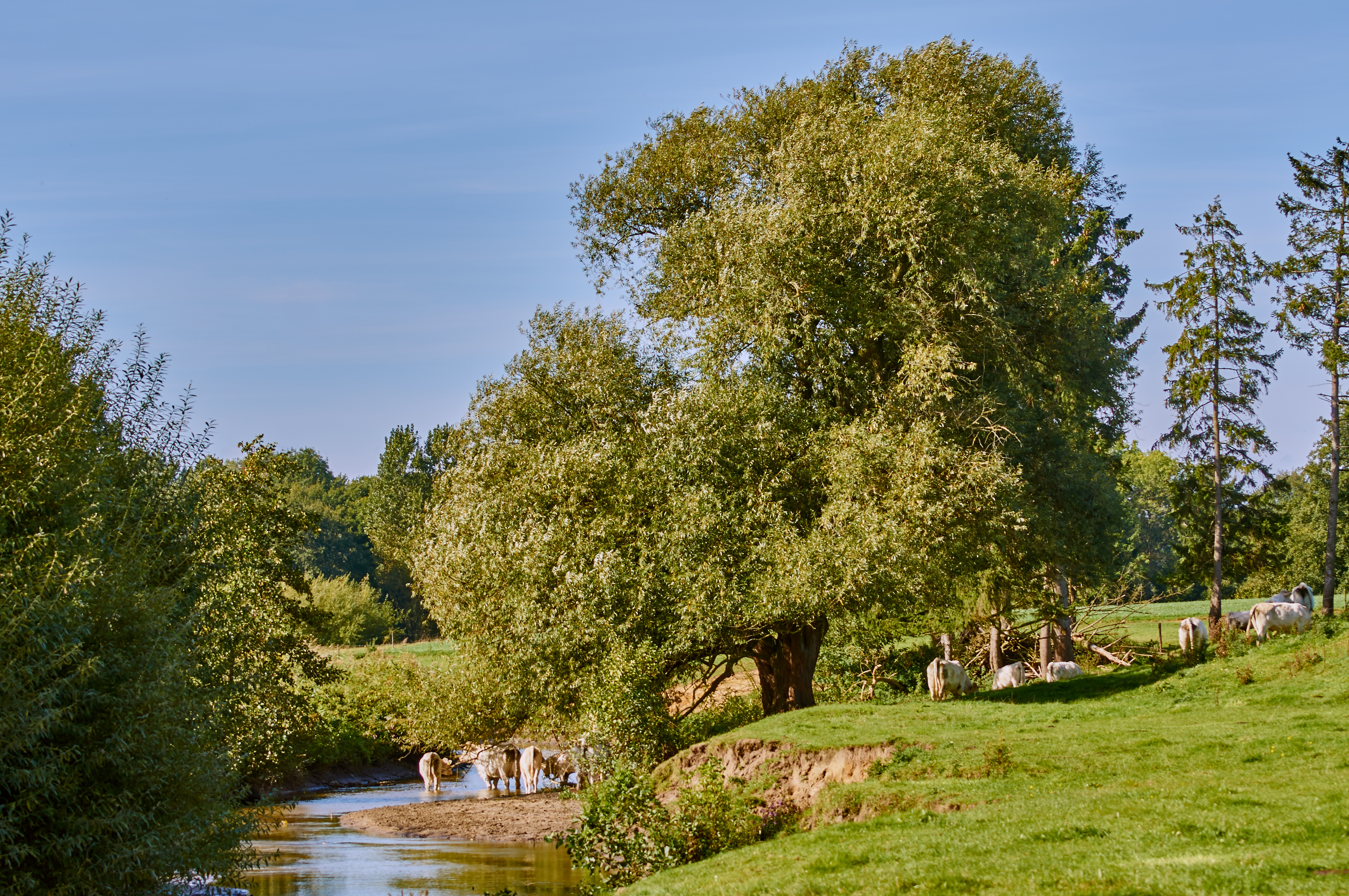
Berkel between Coesfeld and Gescher

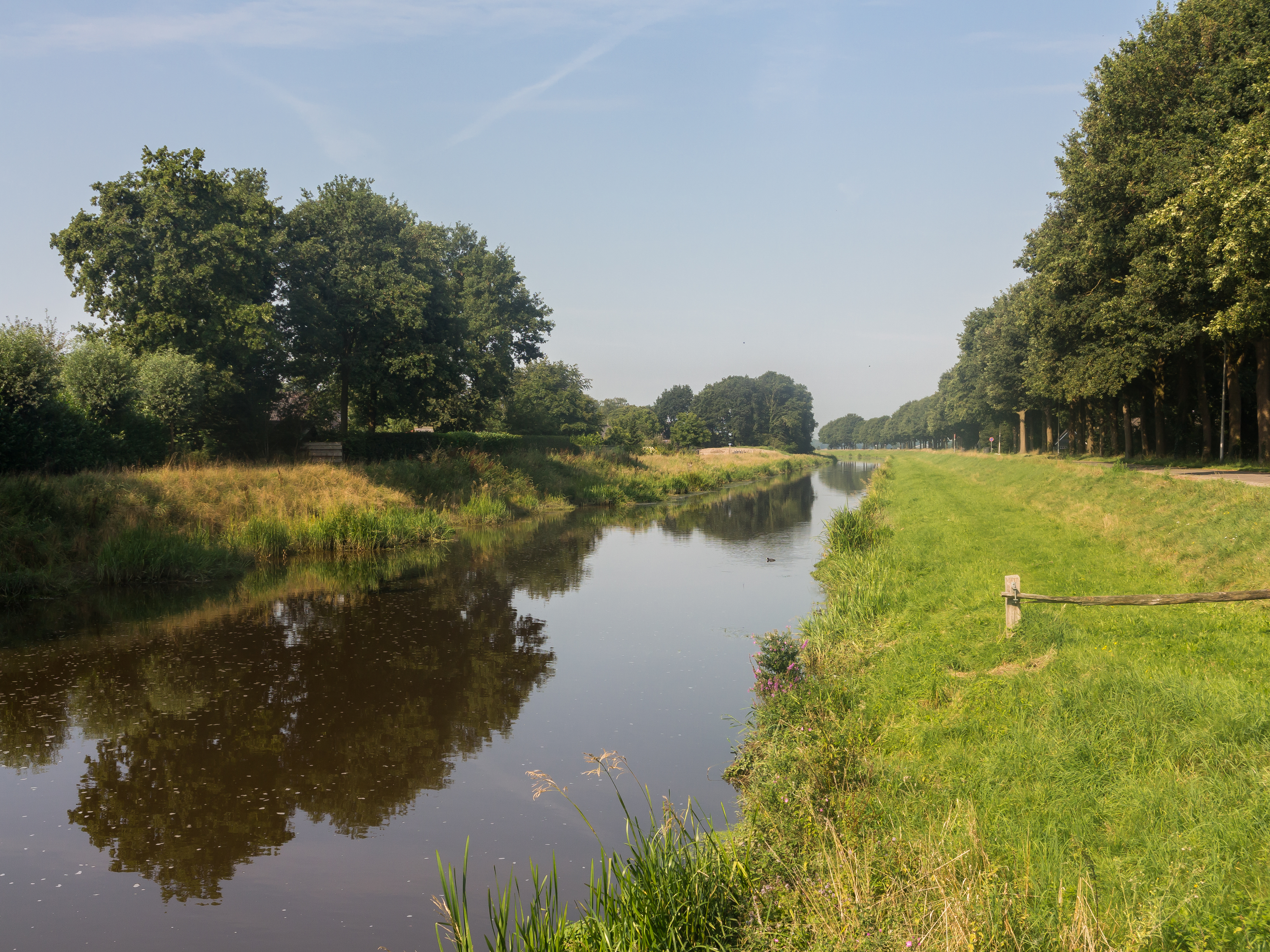
Berkel in Berkelland

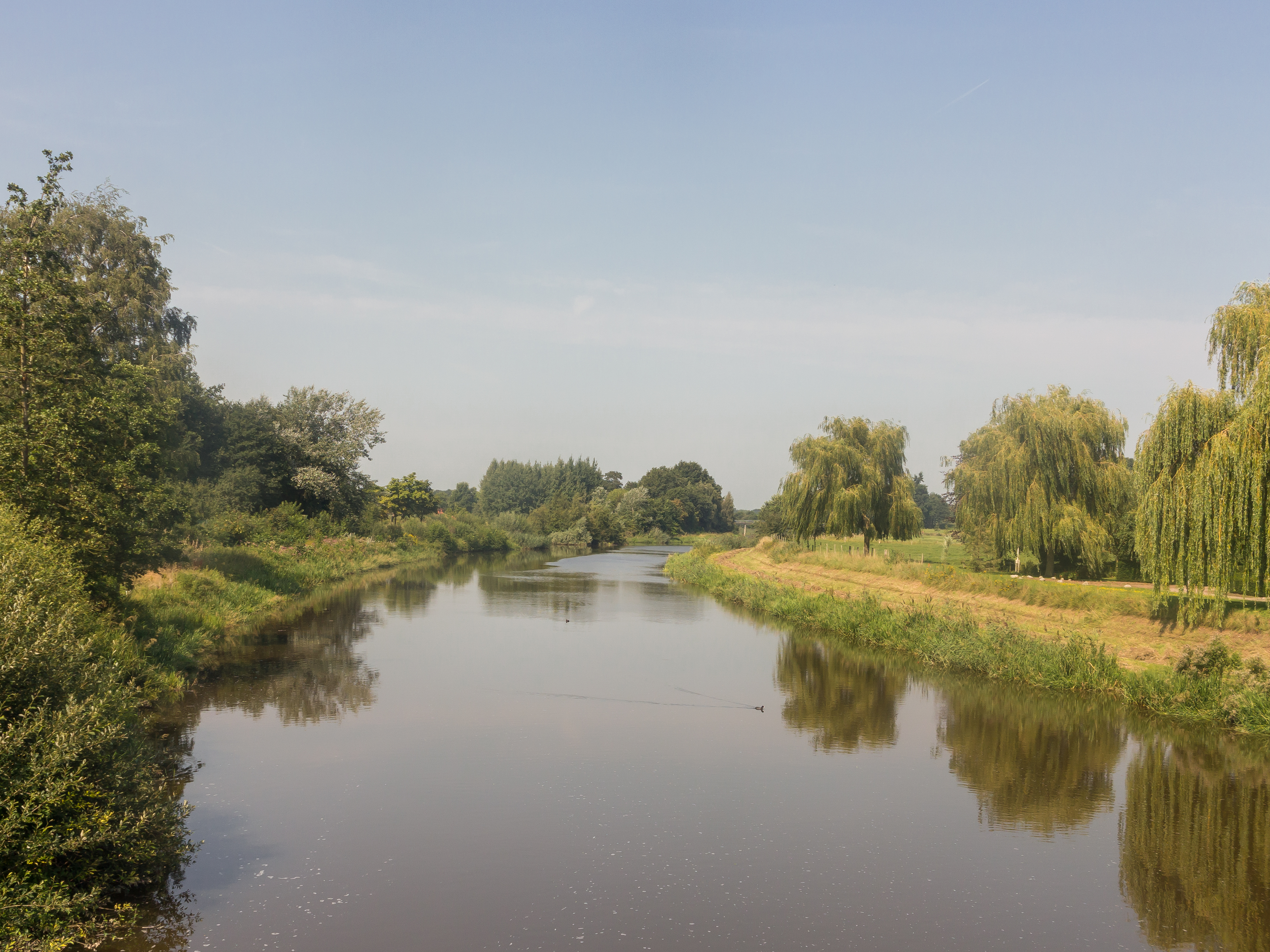
Berkel in Eibergen

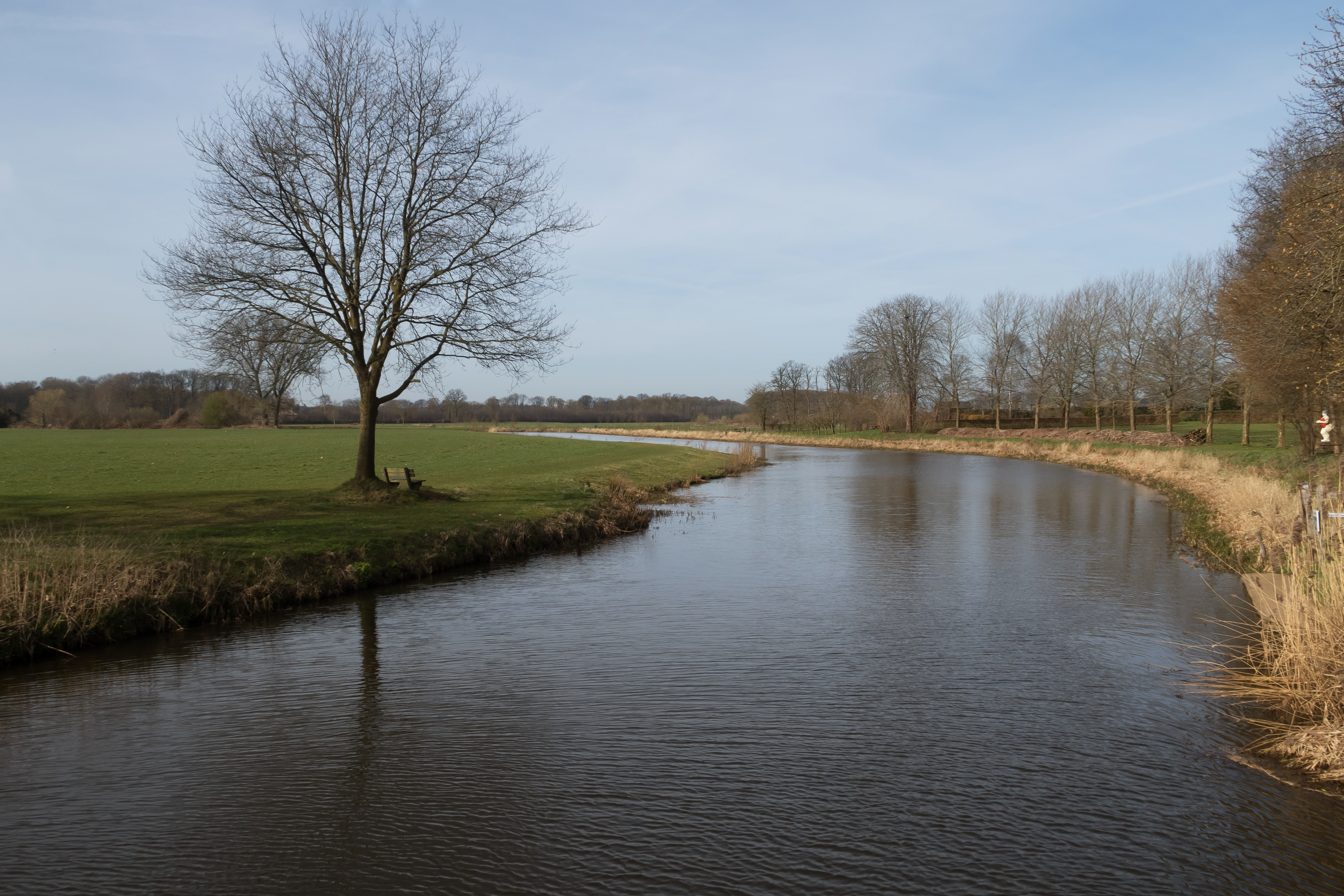
Berkel in Almen
