= Noordijk, Gelderland =

Noordijk
- Village
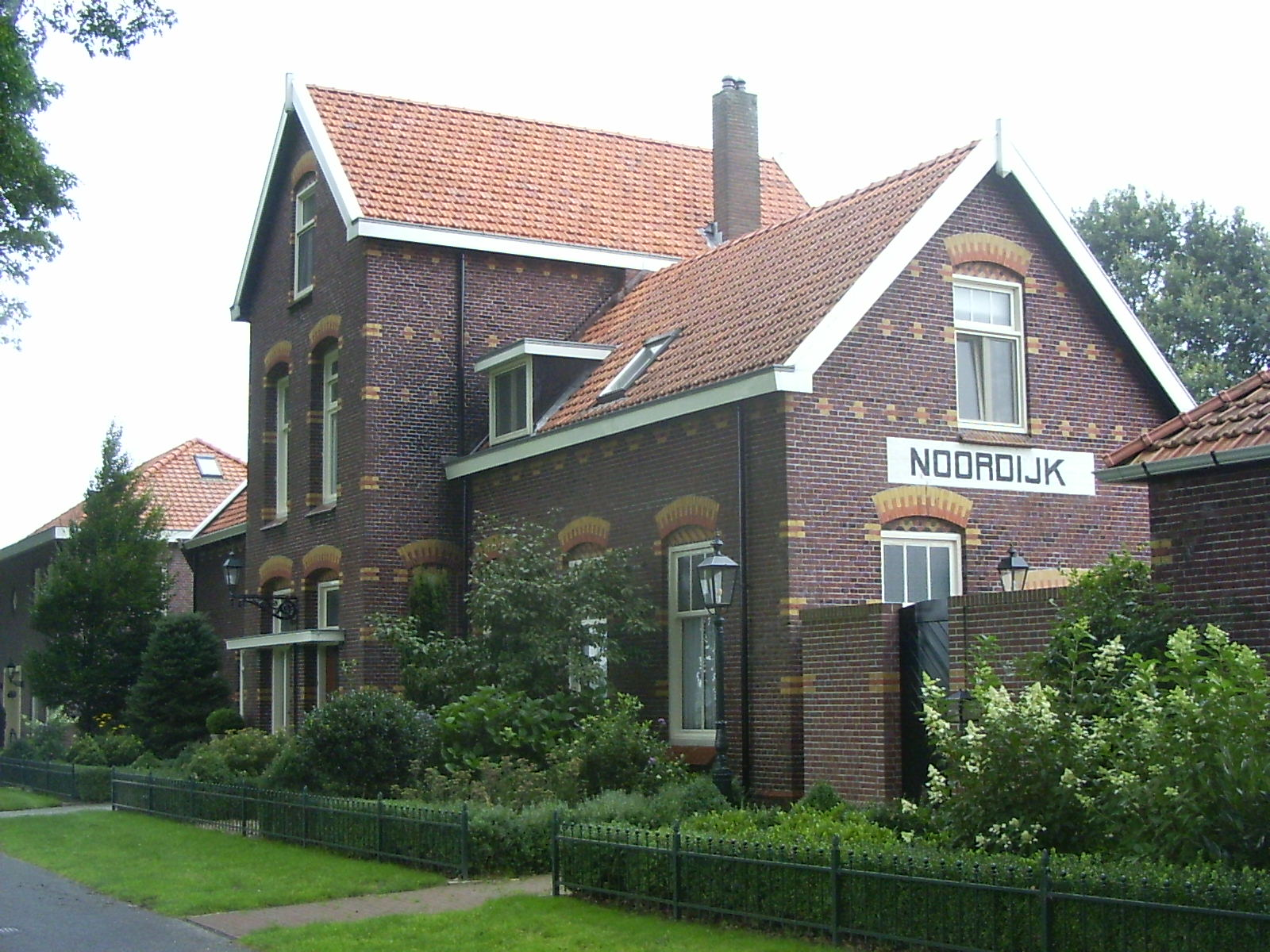
- Former train station

- Location in the province of Gelderland Noordijk (Netherlands)
- Coordinates: 52°8′42″N 6°34′28″E
- Country: Netherlands
- Province: Gelderland
- Municipality: Berkelland

Area
  - Total: 16.70 km^{2} (6.45 sq mi)
- Elevation: 19 m (62 ft)

Population (2021)
  - Total: 875
  - Density: 52.4/km^{2} (136/sq mi)
- Time zone: UTC+1 (CET)
  - Summer (DST): UTC+2 (CEST)
- Postal code: 7161
- Dialing code: 0545

Noordijk is a village northwest of Neede. It is part of the municipality of Berkelland (province of Gelderland, the Netherlands).

It was first mentioned in 1188 as Nortwic, and means "northern neighbourhood". The postal authorities have placed it under Neede. In 1840, it was home to 821 people. Between 1910 and 1933, it had a railway station on the line Neede–Hellendoorn.
