= Theunissen (surname) =

Theunissen is a Dutch patronymic surname meaning "son of Theunis", a nickname for Anthonius. People with this surname include:

- Corneille Theunissen (1863–1918), French sculptor
- Elriesa Theunissen (born 1993), South African cricketer
- Gerald Theunissen (born 1933), American (Louisiana) politician and businessman
- James Theunissen (born 1981), English cricketer
- John Baptist Hubert Theunissen (1905–1979), Dutch archbishop of Malawi
- Marthinus Theunissen (1911–1983), South African sprinter
- Michael Theunissen (1932–2015), German philosopher
- Nicolaas Theunissen (1867–1929), South African cricketer and clergyman
- Werner Theunissen (1942–2010), Dutch composer and musician

Theunisse

- Gert-Jan Theunisse (born 1963), Dutch road racing cyclist

== See also ==
- Teunissen
- Theunissen, a small town in South Africa
- Bill Theunissen Stadium
