= Achterveld, Gelderland =

Coordinates: 52°9′59″N 6°38′01″E

Achterveld is a rural area located in the eastern Netherlands, in the municipality of Berkelland, Gelderland. It is the site of one of the few remaining wet heaths in the Netherlands, which is protected as a nature reserve.
