= Rekken =

- Village
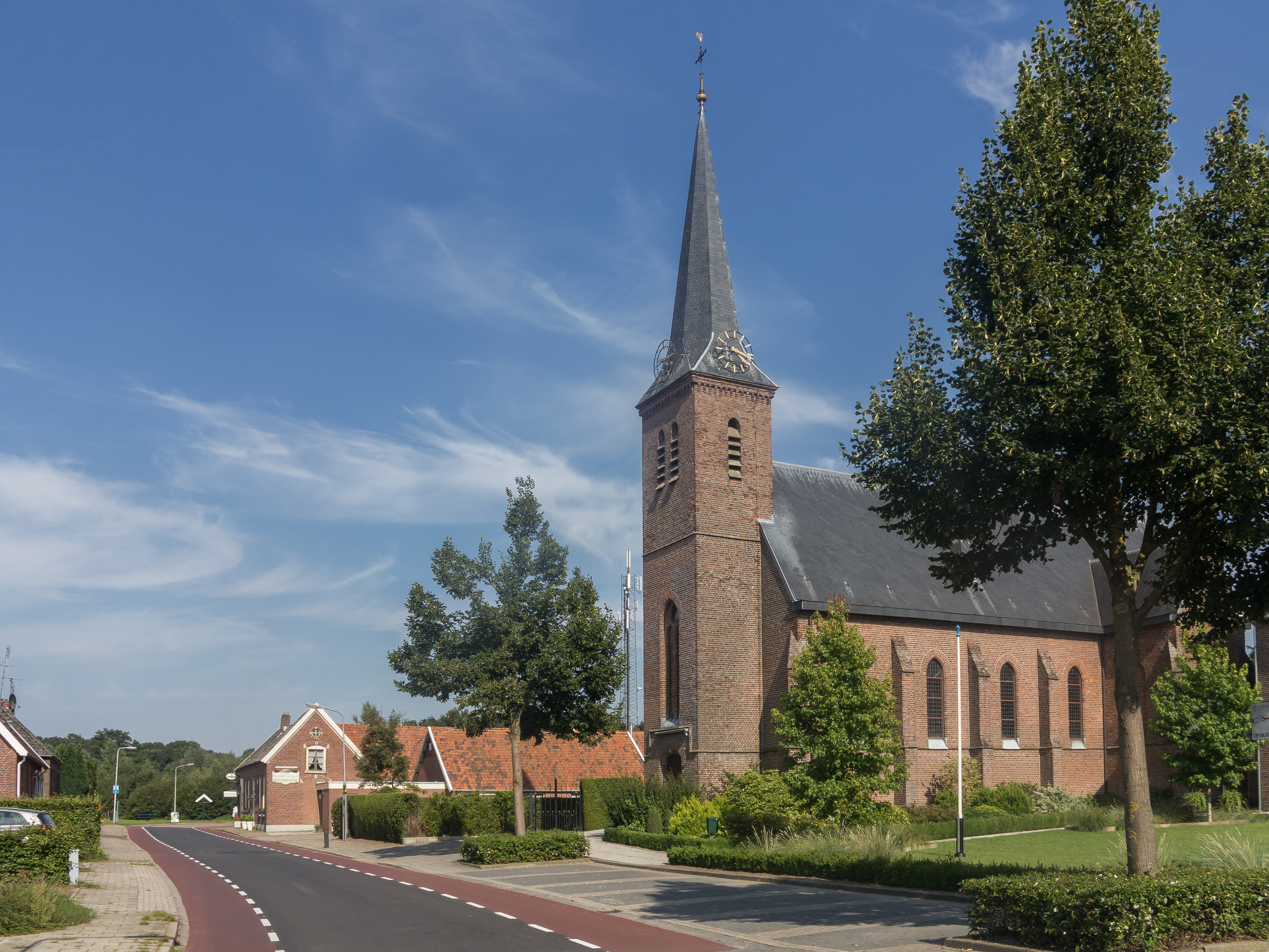
- Catholic Church: the Martyrs of Gorcum

- Location in the province of Gelderland Rekken (Netherlands)
- Coordinates: 52°5′46″N 6°43′29″E
- Country: Netherlands
- Province: Gelderland
- Municipality: Berkelland

Area
  - Total: 20.73 km^{2} (8.00 sq mi)
- Elevation: 25 m (82 ft)

Population (2021)
  - Total: 1,330
  - Density: 64.2/km^{2} (166/sq mi)
- Time zone: UTC+1 (CET)
  - Summer (DST): UTC+2 (CEST)
- Postal code: 7157
- Dialing code: 0545

Rekken is a village in the Dutch municipality of Berkelland. It lies in the most northeast corner of the province of Gelderland, about half a mile from the German border. The river Berkel enters The Netherlands east of Rekken. Rekken is also known in international aviation, by the VHF omnidirectional range called 'Rekken' (RKN).

In the 12th century Rekken is known in documents as part of the Parish Eibergen. Later it was allowed by the Bishopric of Münster to form an independent parish. The Rekkenaren built a Catholic Church on the northern bank of the Berkel.

Around 1616 the heerlijkheid Borculo, (until then an autonomous area, where Rekken was a part of) became a property of the duke of Guelders, and with that to the former Dutch Republic. The church in Rekken had to reform to the Dutch Reformed Church, based on the theory of John Calvin. Many Catholics went to church in Oldenkotte, just across the German border.

Freedom of religion came when Rekken became part of the United Kingdom of the Netherlands. The Catholics then built a church on the southern bank of the Berkel. The river and the two churches divided the village in two parts. This is still visible nowadays.

== Gallery ==
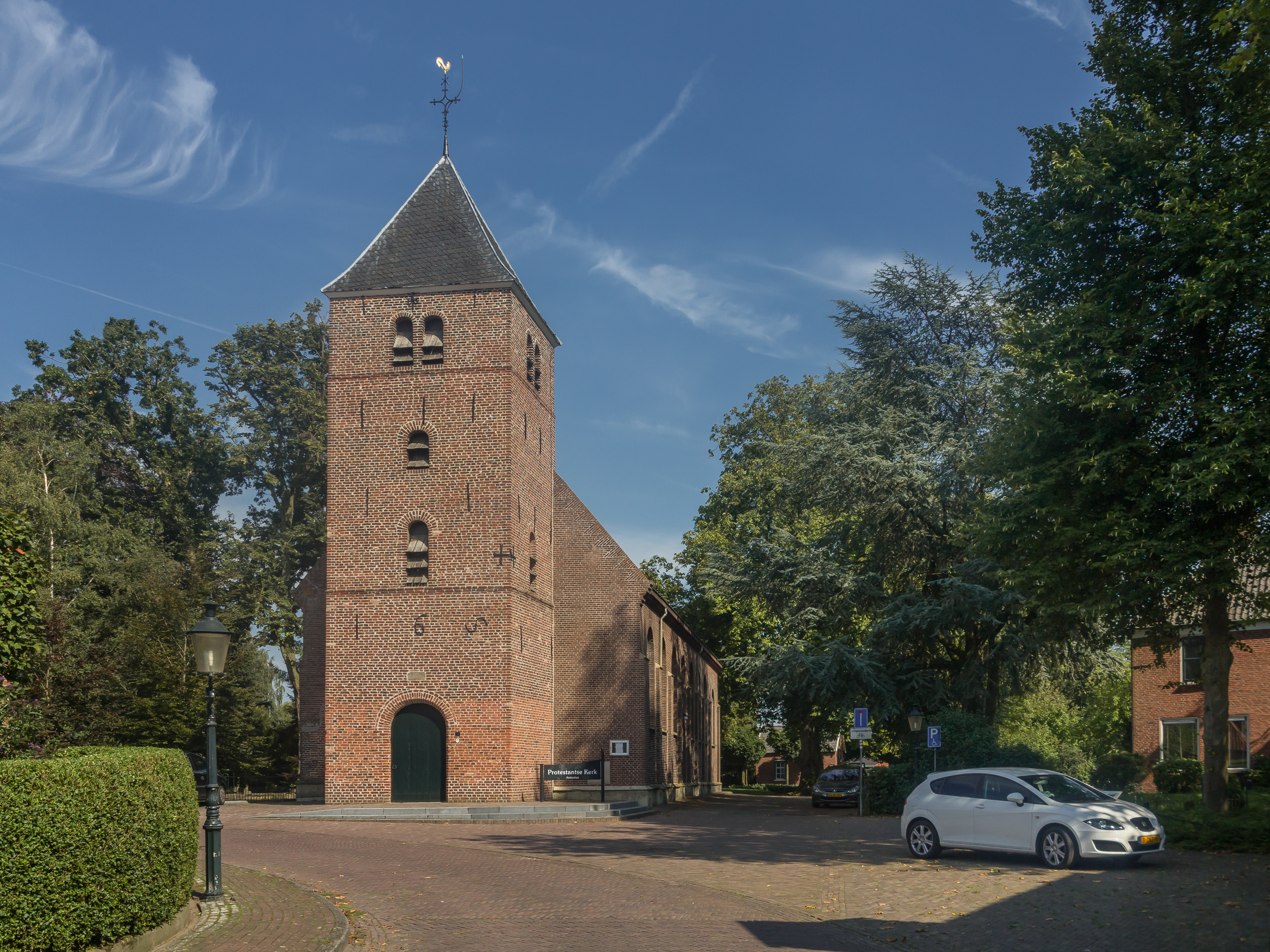
Church: the Antoniuskerk

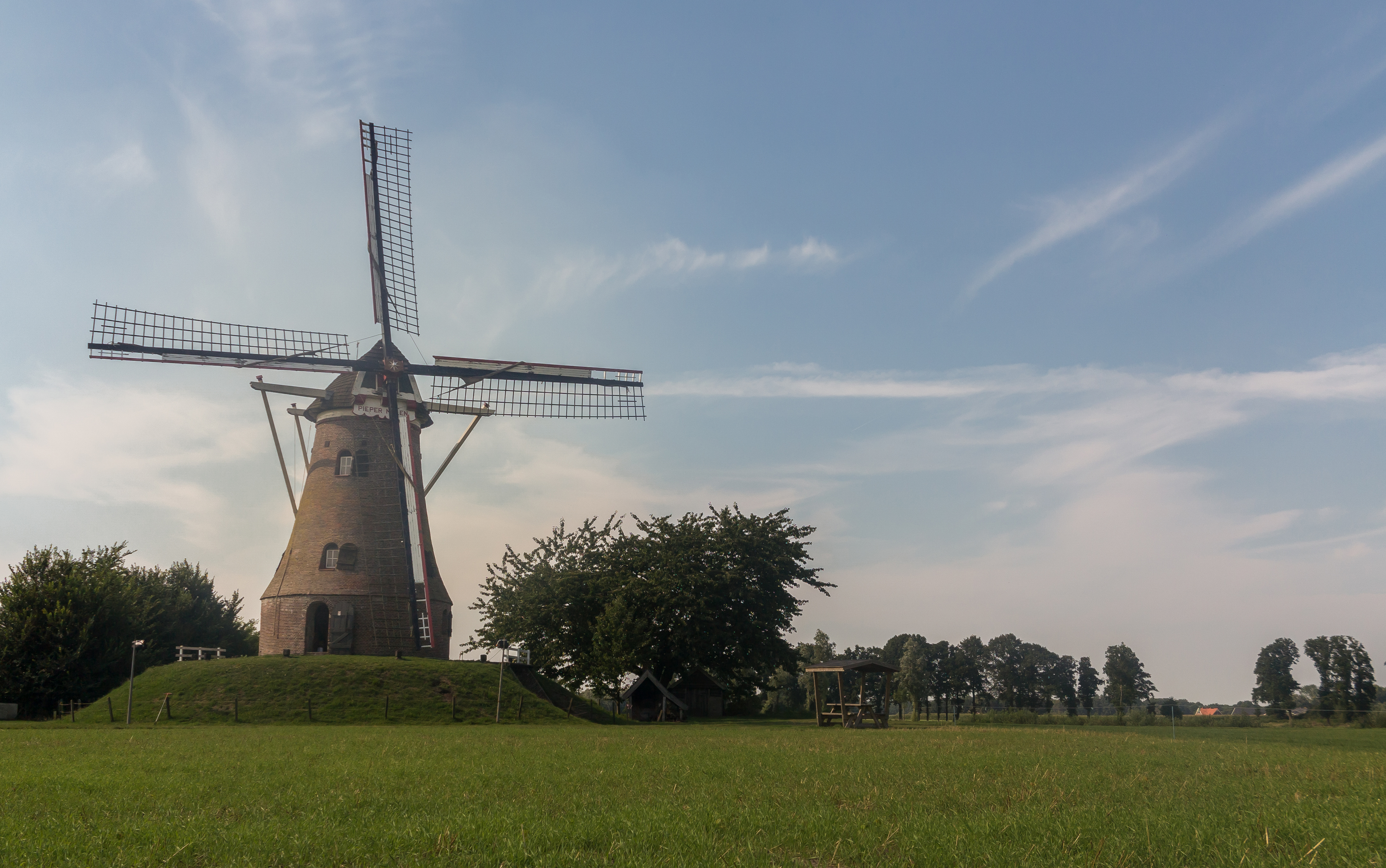
Windmill: the Piepermolen
