= Neede =

- Town
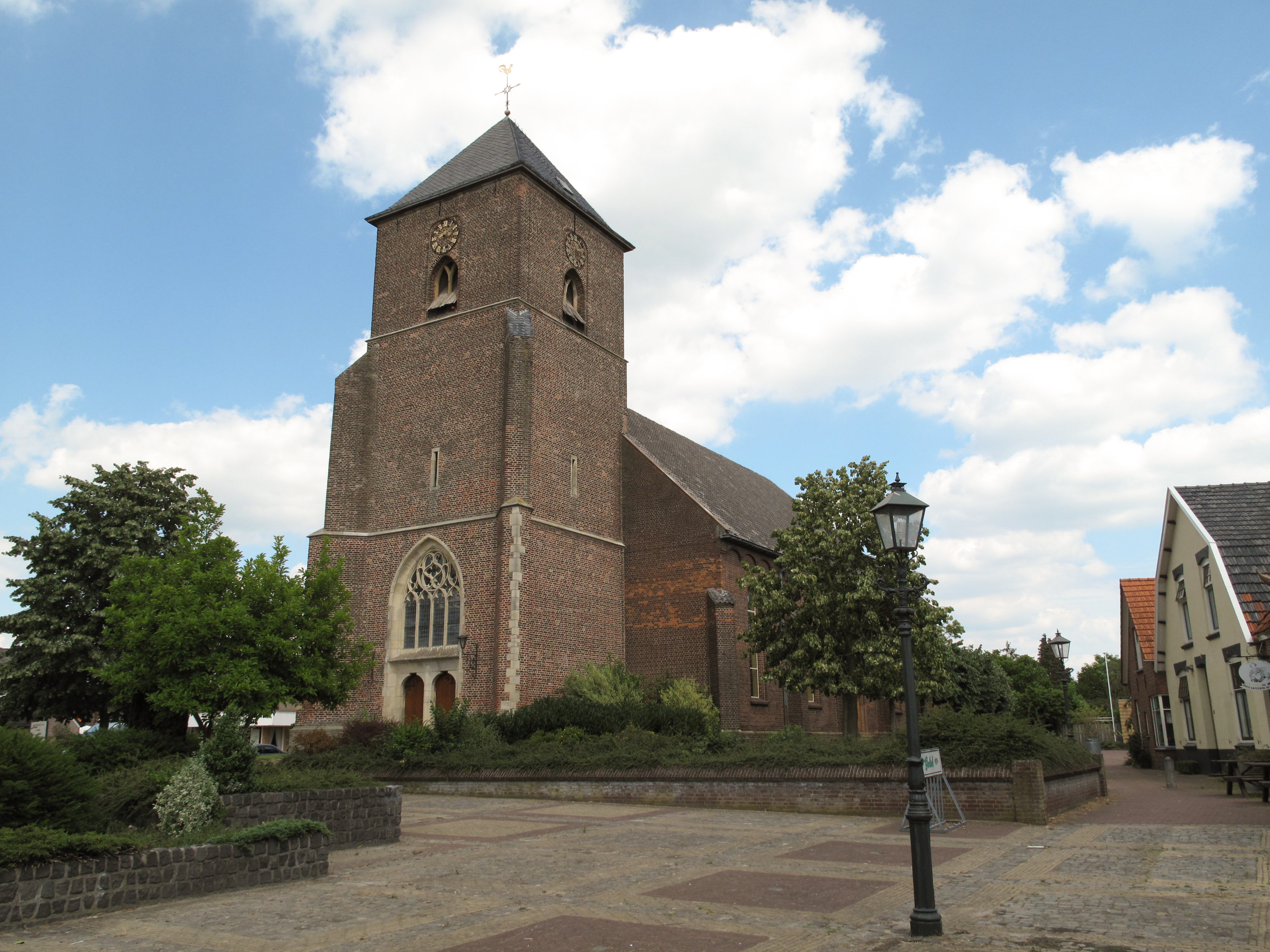
- Neede church

- Flag Coat of arms

- Location in the province of Gelderland Neede (Netherlands)
- Coordinates: 52°7′59″N 6°36′50″E
- Country: Netherlands
- Province: Gelderland
- Municipality: Berkelland

Area
  - Total: 46.26 km^{2} (17.86 sq mi)
- Elevation: 19 m (62 ft)

Population (2021)
  - Total: 10,380
  - Density: 224.4/km^{2} (581.2/sq mi)
- Time zone: UTC+1 (CET)
  - Summer (DST): UTC+2 (CEST)
- Postal code: 7161
- Dialing code: 0545

Neede is a former municipality and a town in the eastern Netherlands.

On 1 January 2005, the municipality of Neede merged with the municipalities of Eibergen, Borculo and Ruurlo into the municipality of Berkelland.

== History ==
It was first mentioned between 1164 and 1176 as "de Nede", and means "the low-lying". It developed on the southern flank of a hill along the Deventer to Vreden road. De Kamp is former havezate was built in 1636 for Otto Gansneb. It was redesigned in 1789. In 1840, Neede was home to 864 people.

On 1 June 1927, an extremely powerful tornado tracked for 48 kilometres (30 mi) from Lichtenvoorde to Tubbergen, taking it directly through Neede. 7 people were killed and 200 were injured after the tornado passed through the town, leveling homes, flipping cargo wagons and throwing objects. The tornado would later be rated IF5 by the European Severe Storms Laboratory, making it one of about 70 officially rated F5/EF5/IF5 tornadoes worldwide and the only one confirmed in the Netherlands. Neighbouring Borculo was hit by an F4 tornado two years prior.

== Former population centres ==
Achterveld, Broeke, Hoonte, Lochuizen, Neede, Noordijk, Noordijkerveld and Rietmolen.

== Gallery ==
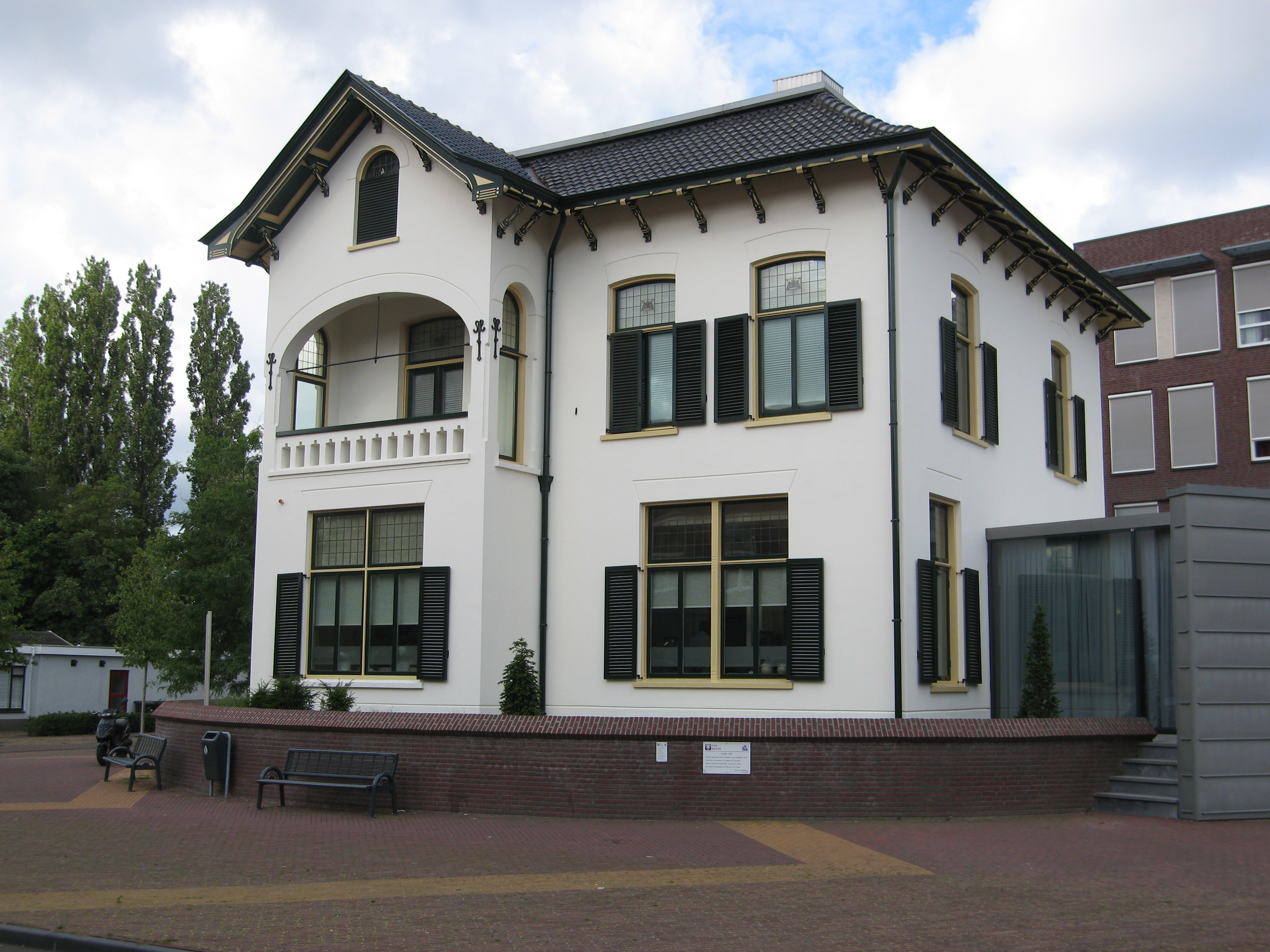
House in Neede

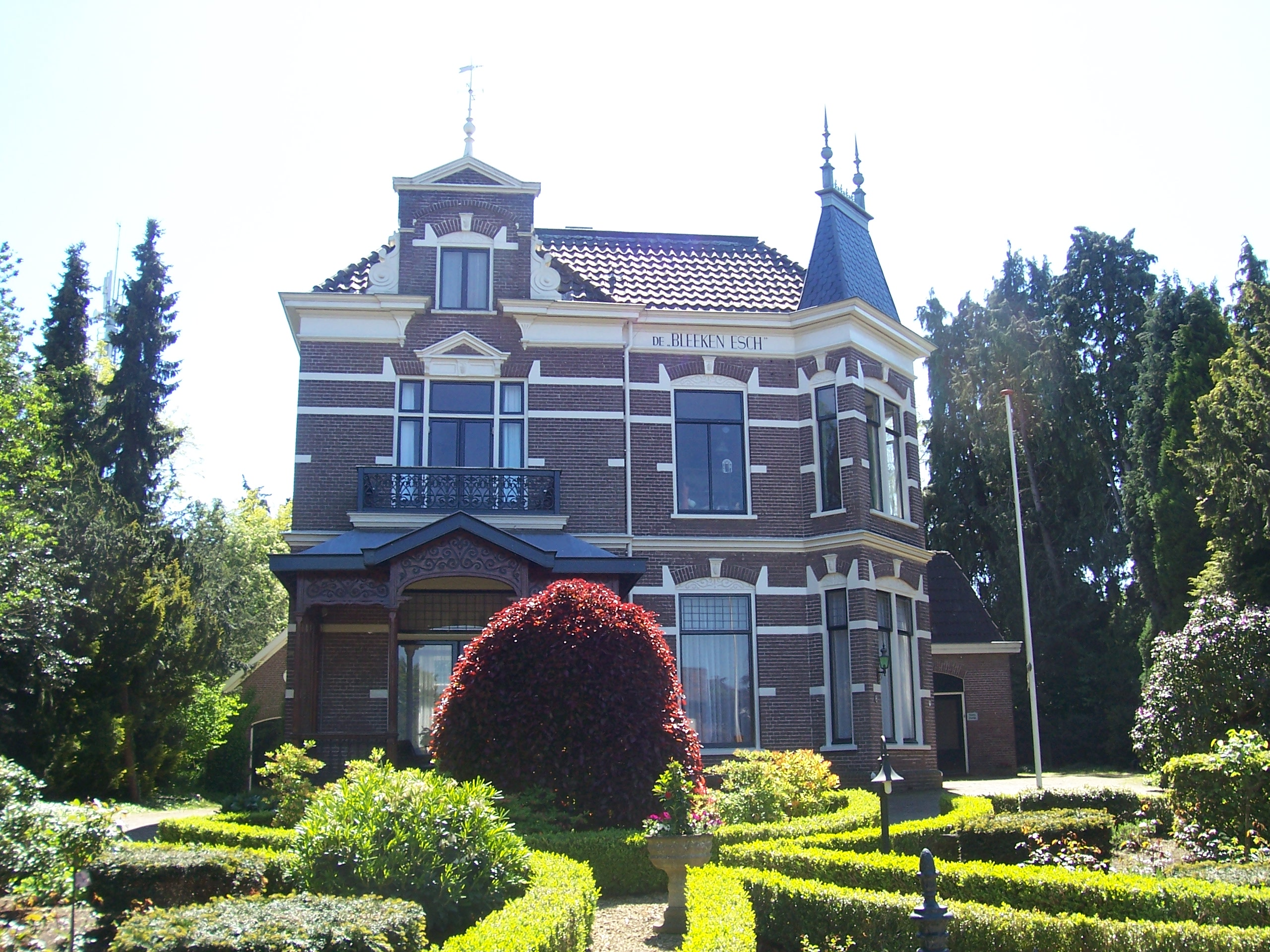
Villa "De Bleeken Esch"

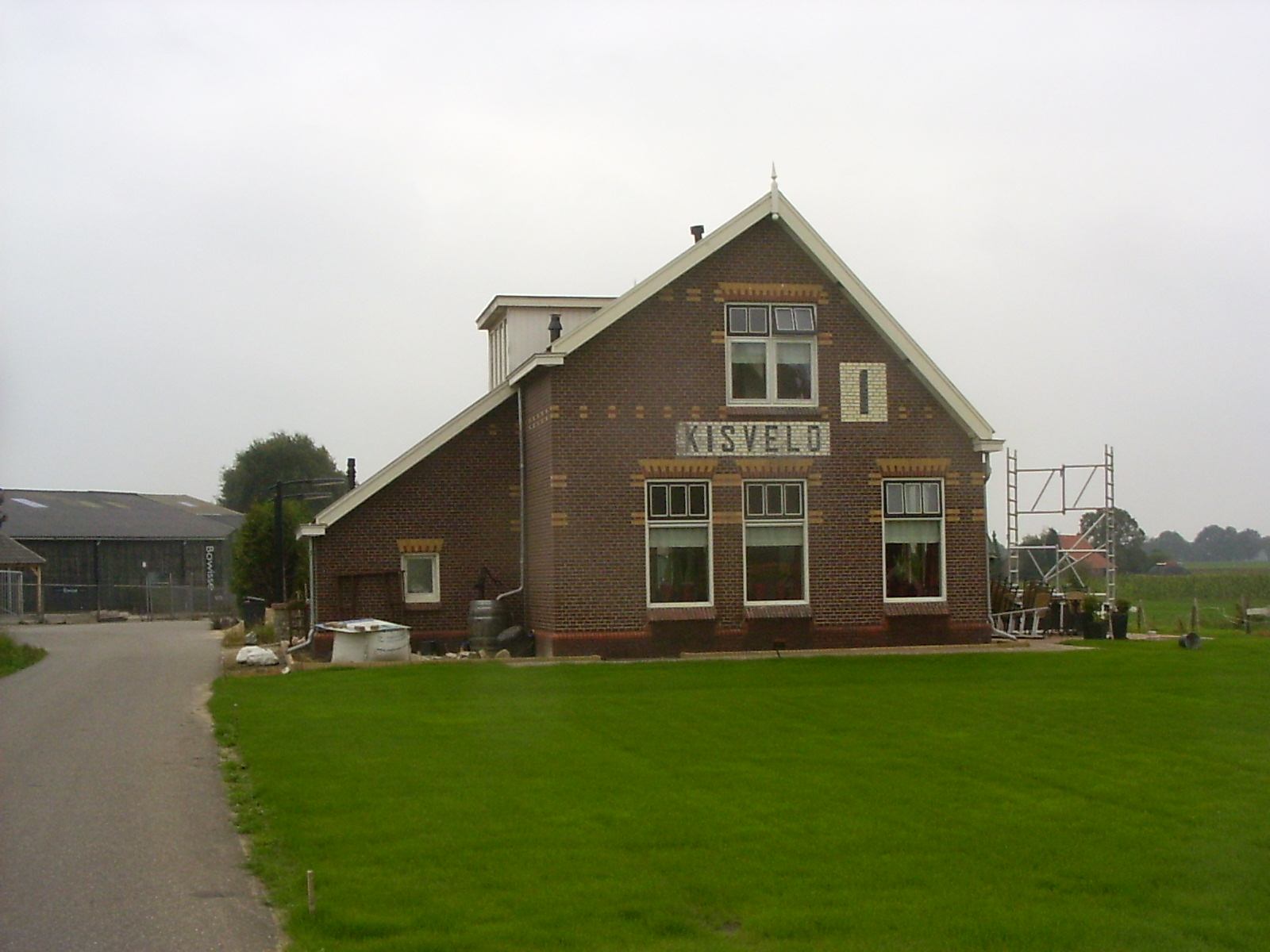
Former train station Kisveld

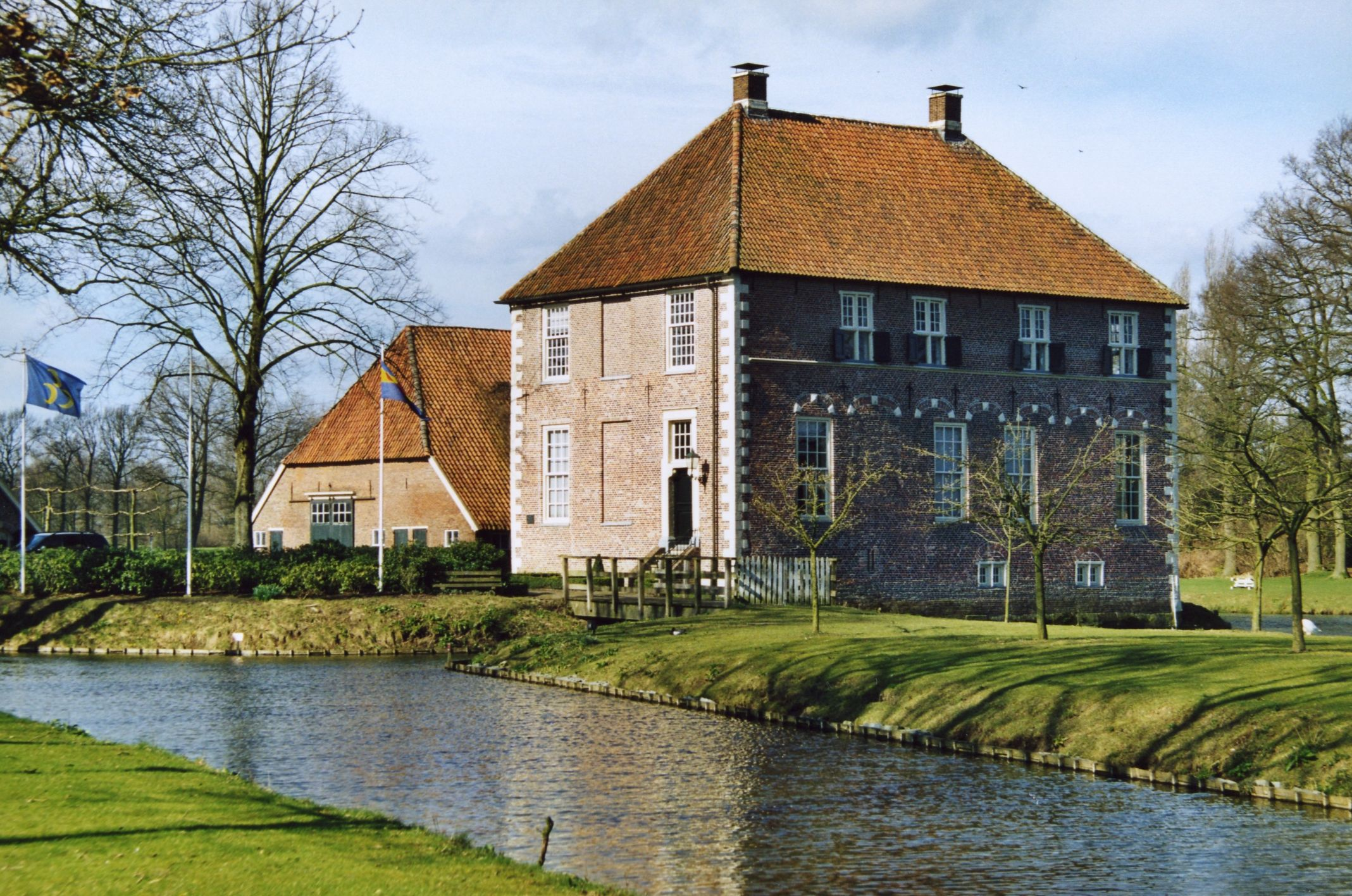
Havezate Kamp
