= Beltrum =

- Village
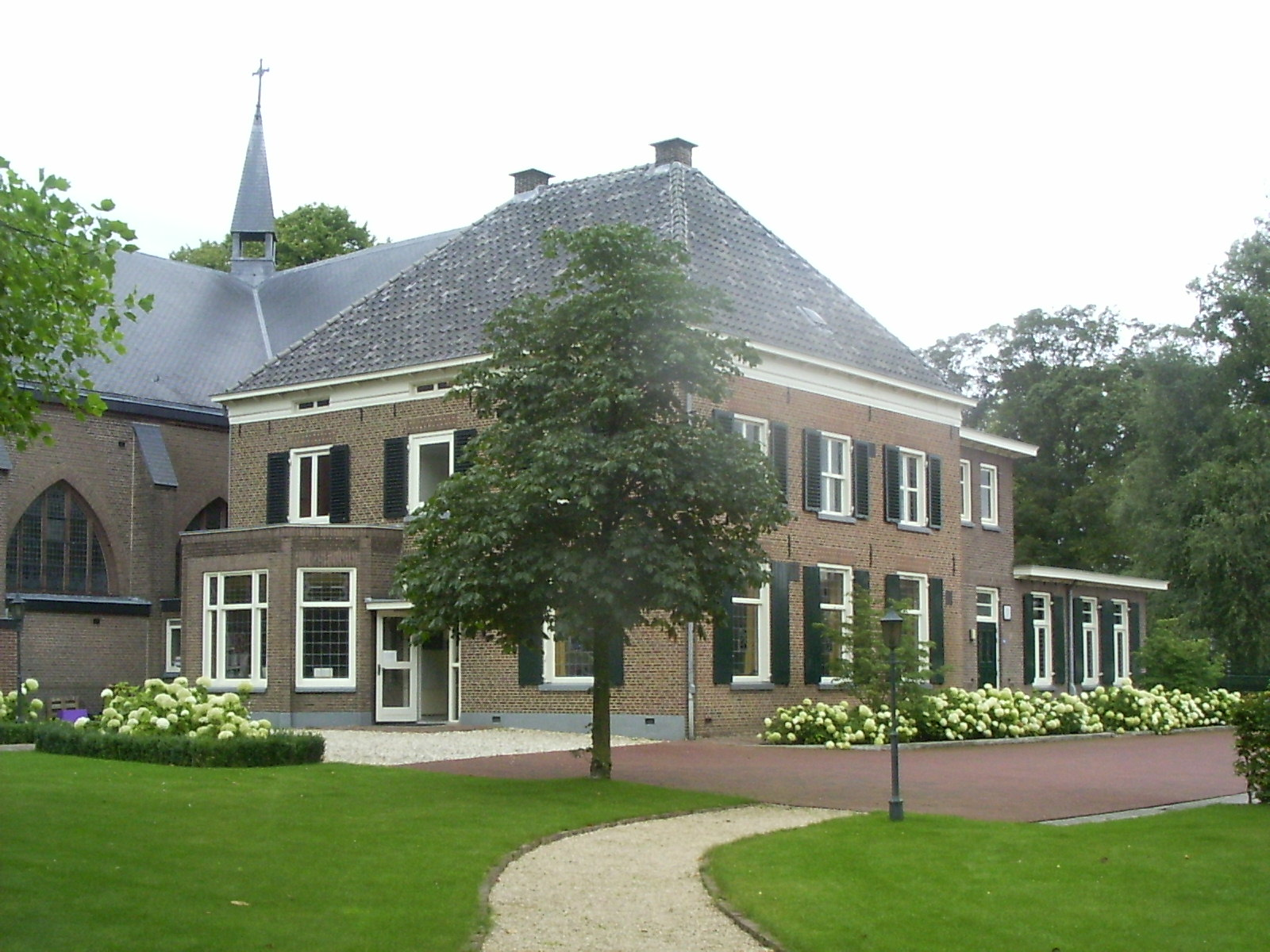
- Clery house in Beltum

- Flag Coat of arms

- Location in the province of Gelderland Beltrum (Netherlands)
- Coordinates: 52°4′8″N 6°33′57″E
- Country: Netherlands
- Province: Gelderland
- Municipality: Berkelland

Area
  - Total: 34.29 km^{2} (13.24 sq mi)
- Elevation: 19 m (62 ft)

Population (2021)
  - Total: 2,830
  - Density: 82.5/km^{2} (214/sq mi)
- Time zone: UTC+1 (CET)
  - Summer (DST): UTC+2 (CEST)
- Postal code: 7156
- Dialing code: 0544

Beltrum is a village in the region called Achterhoek in the province of Gelderland in the Netherlands.

== Religion ==
Most people of the village belong to the Catholic parish 'Onze Lieve Vrouwe ten Hemelopneming' which was founded with the building of a parish church in 1853. Before they were mainly oriented at the Catholic Calixtus church, the former Catholic church in Groenlo.

== Politics ==
Before the 18th century Beltrum was part of the Stad en Heerlijkheid of Borculo. From about 1795 until 1819 it was an independent municipality. After this short independent period it became a hamlet and part of Eibergen. Today Beltrum belongs to the municipality of Berkelland.

== Sports ==
Sports in Beltrum is organized in community clubs. The biggest of them is the 'Sportcentrale VIOS', a federation of Beltrum sports clubs with member clubs that are active in soccer, gymnastics, handball, volleyball, table tennis or tug-of-war. Besides VIOS there is a tennis club and a sports rifle club.

== Export products ==
Beneath the wooden shoe factory of Europe, Beltrum's is known for dweilorkest Valse Loch and the coverrockband Aftershock. Beltrum is also known for the annual survival run in January. And the annual Dahliacorso, on the first Sunday of September.

== Gallery ==
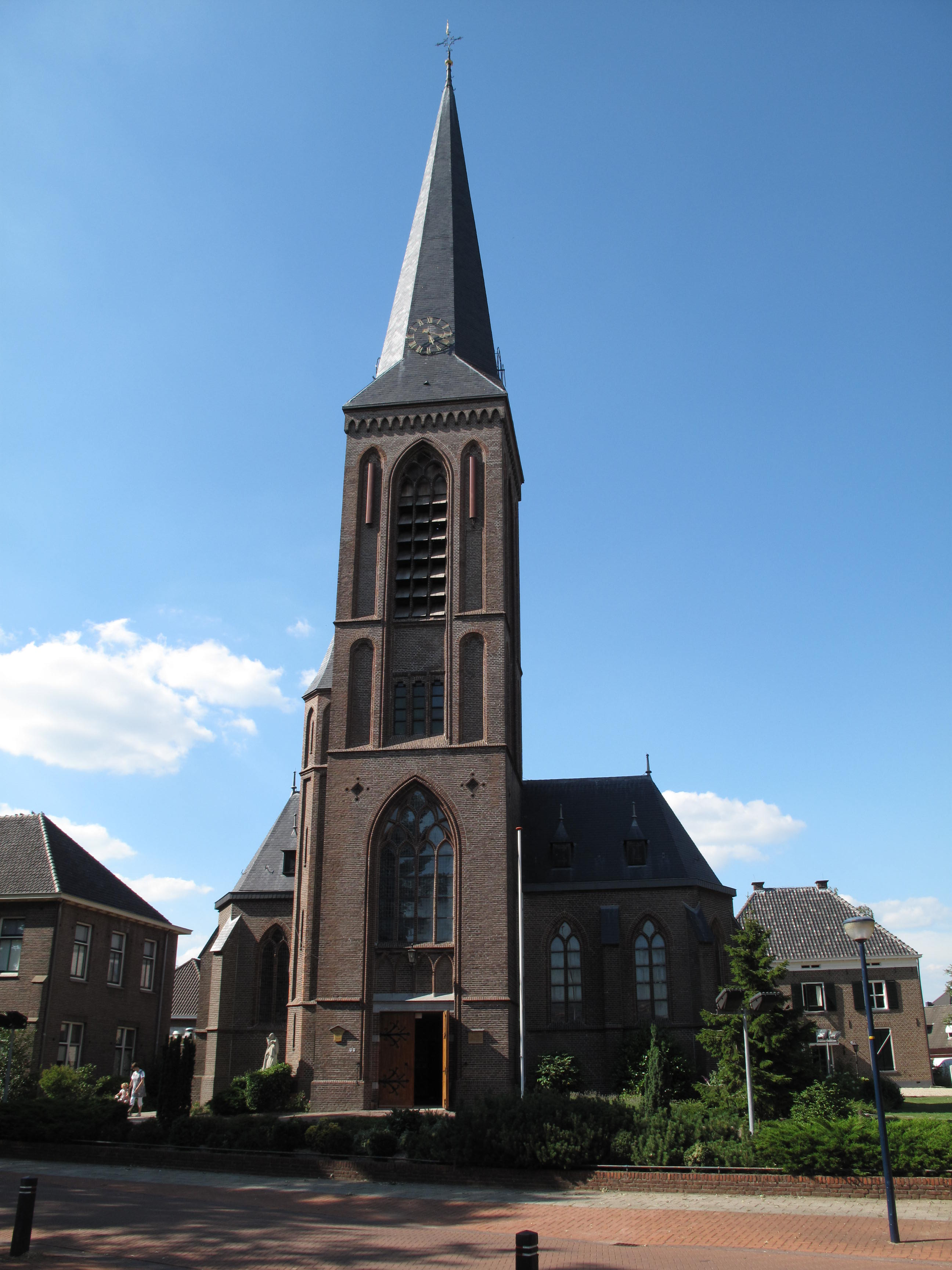
Beltrum, church: Onze Lieve Vrouw ten Hemelopneming

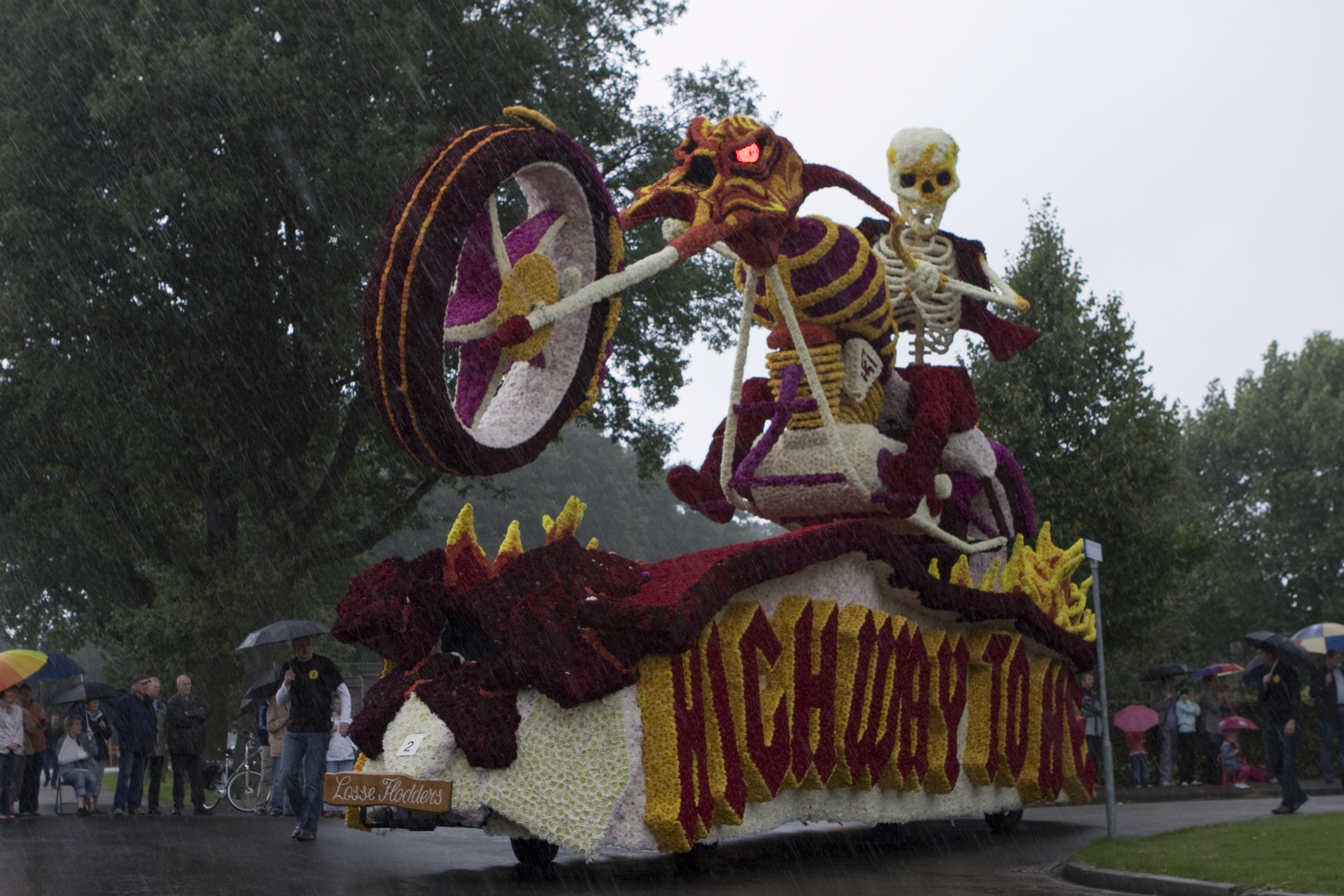
Flower corso in Beltrum

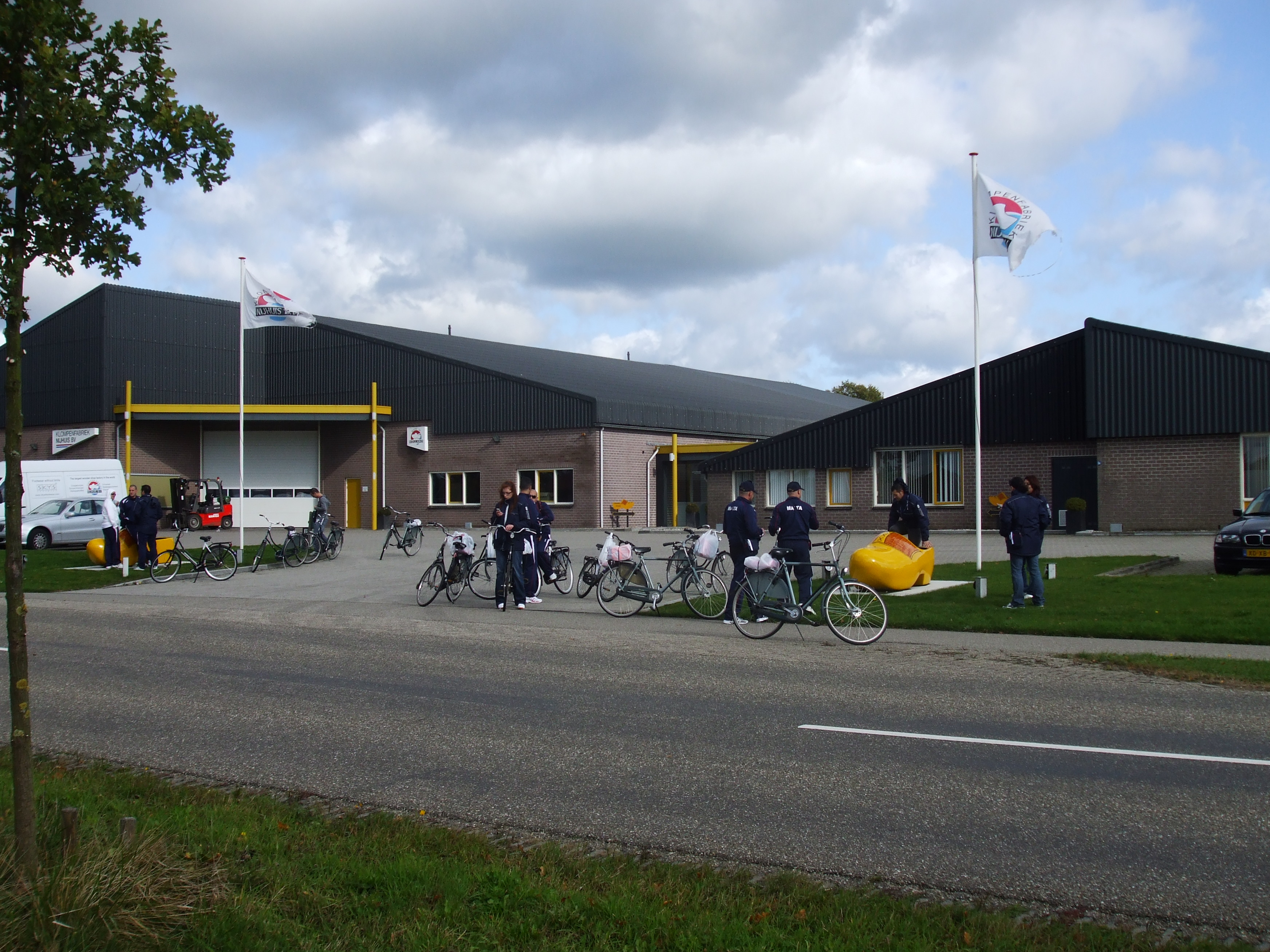
Wooden shoe factory
