= Bert Teunissen =

Dutch photographer (born 1959)

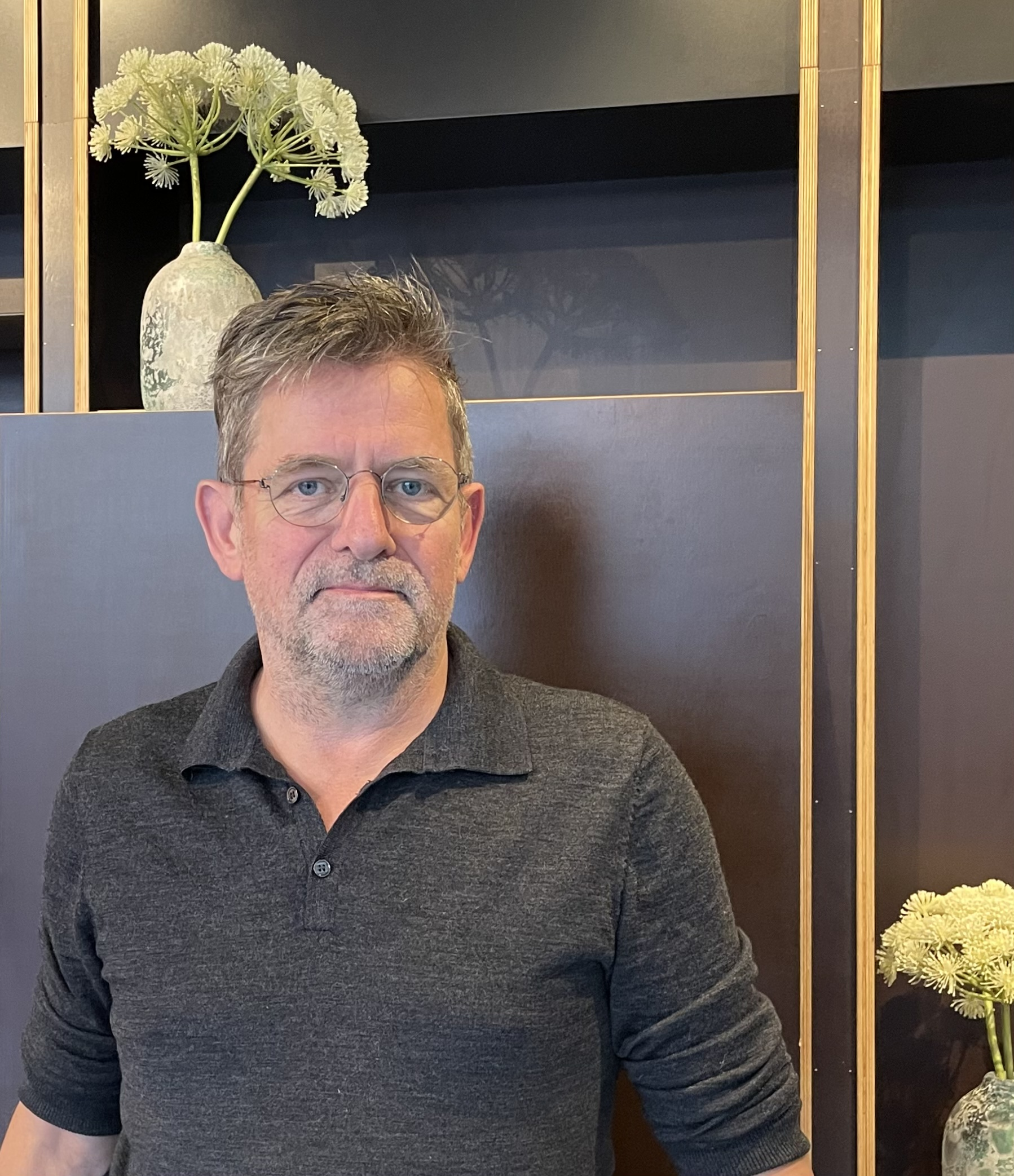

Bert Teunissen (born 1959 Ruurlo, Gelderland) is a Dutch photographer who, since 1996, has documented European homes built before World War II and their inhabitants in his book Domestic Landscapes: A Portrait of Europeans at Home. Teunissen has photographed houses built before electricity was common in order to preserve a quickly disappearing part of Western European life and culture. He later added images from Japan to his project.

== Solo exhibitions ==
- Museet for Fotokunst, Odense, DK 1999
- Gentofte Hovedbibliotet, Copenhagen DK 2000
- Gallery 24, New York, USA 2000
- Møstings Hus, Copenhagen, DK 2000
- Stedelijk Museum, Zutphen NL 2001
- Konstmuseet, Ystad, S 2001
- AA Kerk, Groningen, NL 2002
- Artspace Witzenhausen NL 2003
- Prague House of Photography Cz. 2004
- Museu da Imagem, Braga Portugal 2004
- Kienhuis Hoving, Enschede NL 2005
- Biblioteca Central da UTAD, Vila Real, Portugal 2005
- Océ 's Hertogenbosch NL 2005 - 2010
- Art Amsterdam NL 2006
- Huis Marseille, Amsterdam NL 2006
- The Photographers' Gallery, London UK 2006
- Aperture Gallery, New York USA 2007
- Museum Haus Esters, Krefeld, Germany 2007

== Books ==
- Luister met je ogen-Het Josti Band Orkest 2001
- Paleizen van het Geheugen-7 Leidse jongenskamers, Leiden, Antiquariaat van Paddenburgh 2003
- Domestic Landscapes-Japan, Amsterdam, Artspace Witzenhausen 2003
- Domestic Landscapes-Portugal, Braga, Museo da Imagem 2004
- Domestic Landscapes-An Introduction Manual, Huizen, Bert Teunissen 2006
- Domestic Landscapes-A Portrait of Europeans at Home, Aperture 2007
- Domestic Landscapes-Ein Porträt von Europäern Daheim, Kerber 2007
- On The Road-A Domestic Landscapes Travelog, Bert Teunissen 2008
