= Ruurlo =

Village in Gelderland, Netherlands

- Village
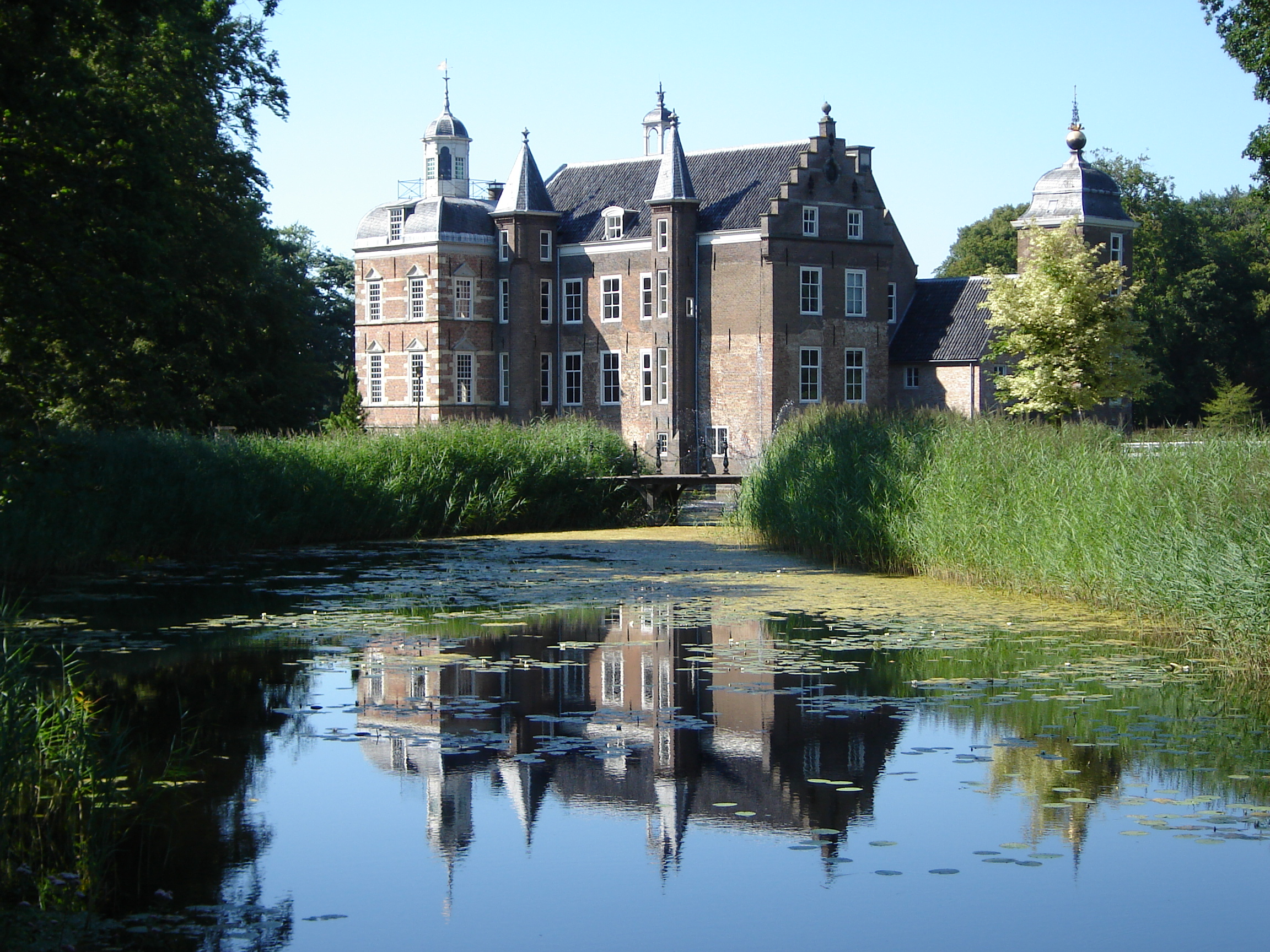
- Ruurlo Castle

- Flag Coat of arms

- Location in the province of Gelderland Ruurlo (Netherlands)
- Coordinates: 52°5′14″N 6°27′28″E
- Country: Netherlands
- Province: Gelderland
- Municipality: Berkelland

Area
  - Total: 55.02 km^{2} (21.24 sq mi)
- Elevation: 17 m (56 ft)

Population (2021)
  - Total: 7,730
  - Density: 140/km^{2} (364/sq mi)
- Time zone: UTC+1 (CET)
  - Summer (DST): UTC+2 (CEST)
- Postal code: 7261
- Dialing code: 0573

Ruurlo (Dutch: [ˈryːrloː]) is a village and former municipality in the province of Gelderland in the eastern part of the Netherlands.

The town has a station on the Zutphen to Winterswijk railway line, and is served by trains every half-hour in both directions. In the evening and during Sundays and holidays, there is an hourly service.

Ruurlo Castle lies just outside the town and is a popular place for weddings. The castle was used as the town hall until 1 January 2005, when the municipality Ruurlo merged with the municipalities of Borculo, Neede and Eibergen into the municipality of Berkelland. The castle now hosts a modern art museum called museum MORE.

== History ==
It was first mentioned in the 1180s as Ritherlo, and means "cattle near forest". The village developed in the Middle Ages around Ruurlo Castle. The castle was first mentioned in 1326. It was enlarged in 1571, 1627 and 1727. The gardens date from 1801. After the 1984 restoration was completed, it served as town hall.

The Dutch Reformed Church has 14th century elements. The tower dates from the late-15th century and was restored in 1793 and 1894. The Catholic Saint Willibrord was completed in 1871, and was designed by Pierre Cuypers. In 1840, Ruurlo had a population of 419 people.

The Ruurlo railway station opened in 1878. The building was demolished in 1982, and replaced by a simple bus stop which was removed in 2000. The saw and gristmill Agneta dates from 1851. It was originally an oil mill, but was redesigned in 1917. The mill is now operated by a foundation who have restored it to full use again. It now operates as a living museum and produces timber. There is an electical back-up to operate the sawmill when there isn't enough wind.

== Former population centres ==
Brinkmanshoek, De Bruil, De Haar, Heurne, Mariënvelde, Ruurlo and Veldhoek.

== Gallery ==
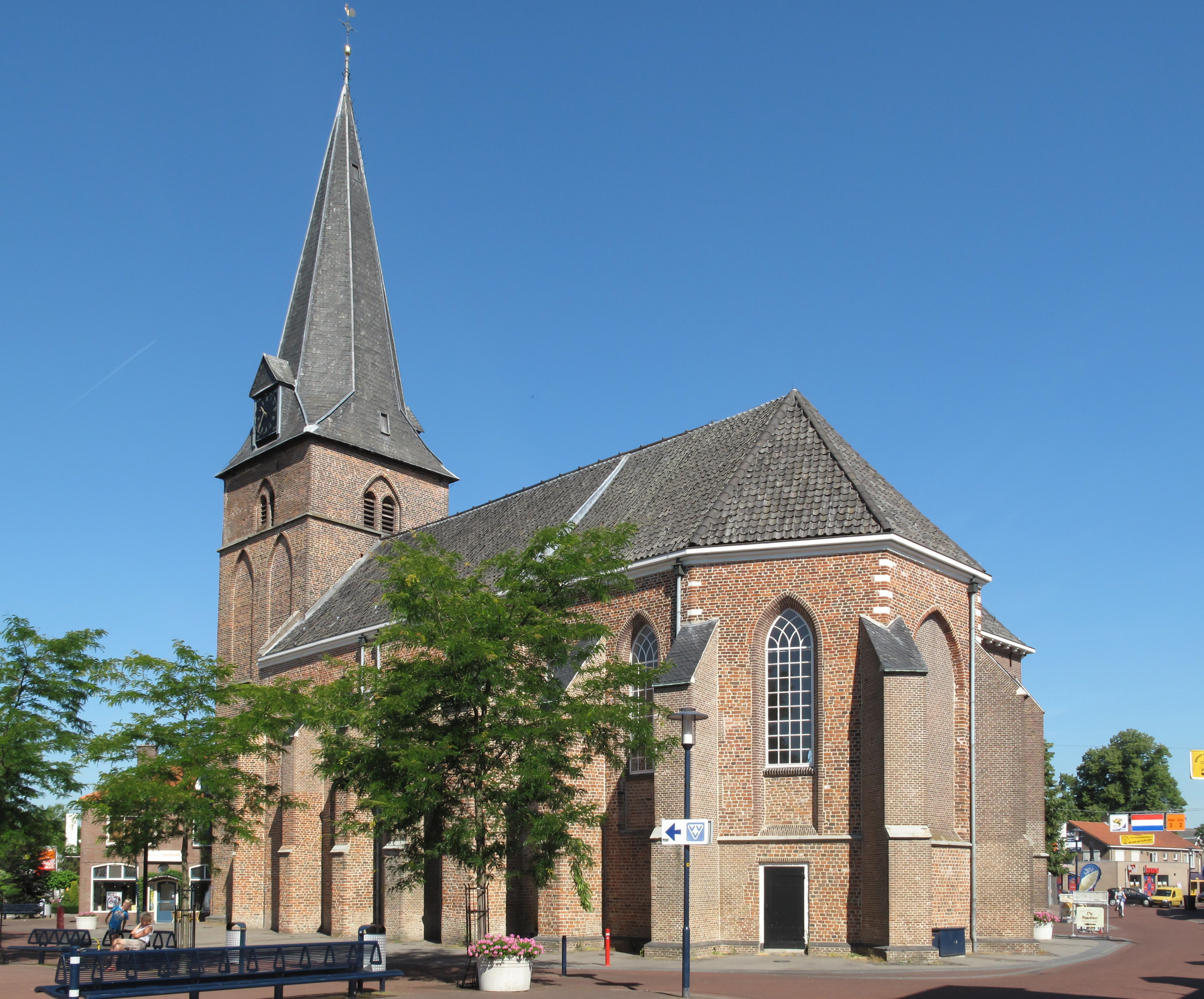
Ruurlo, reformed church

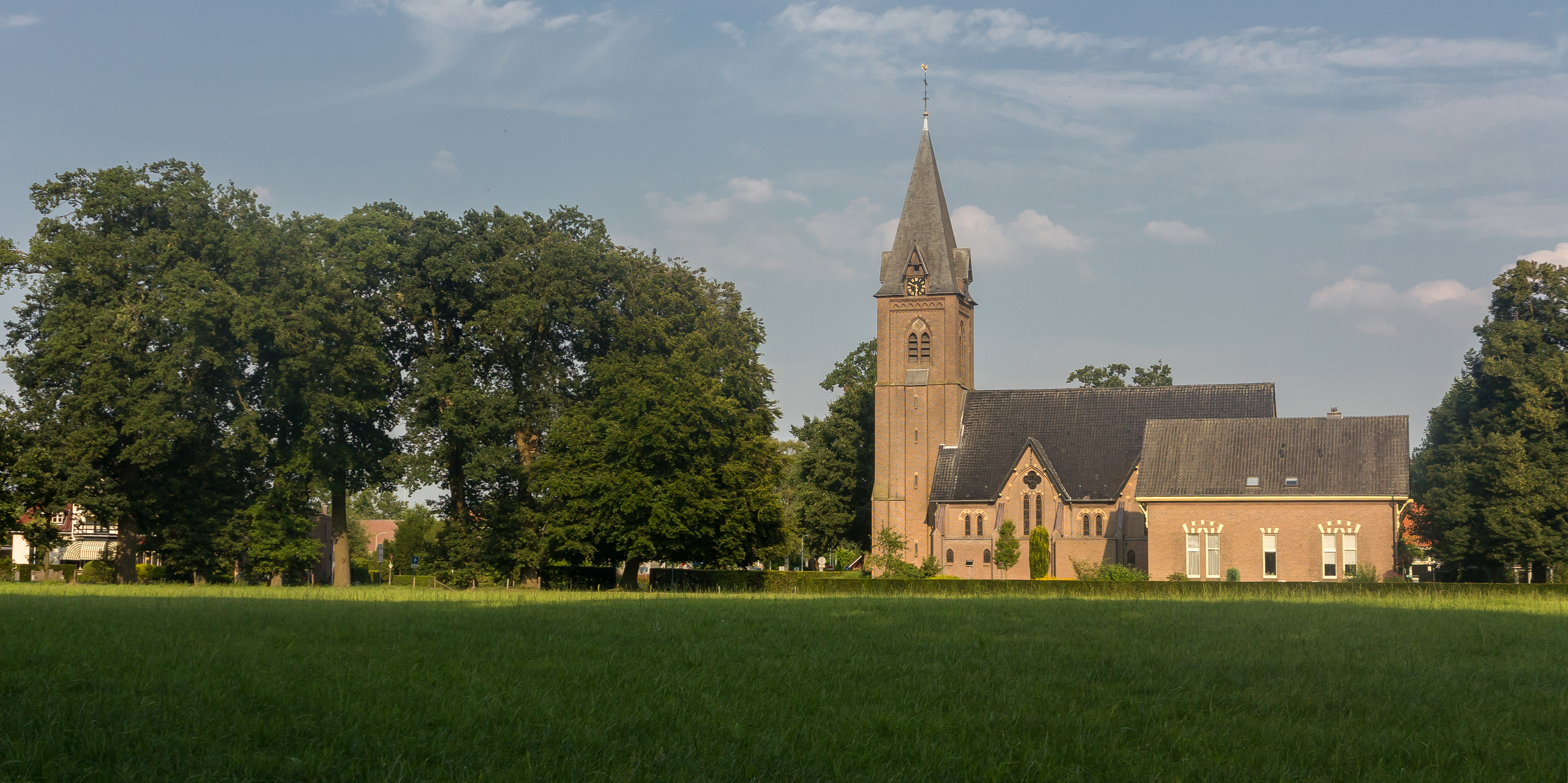
Ruurlo, church: de Sint Willibrorduskerk

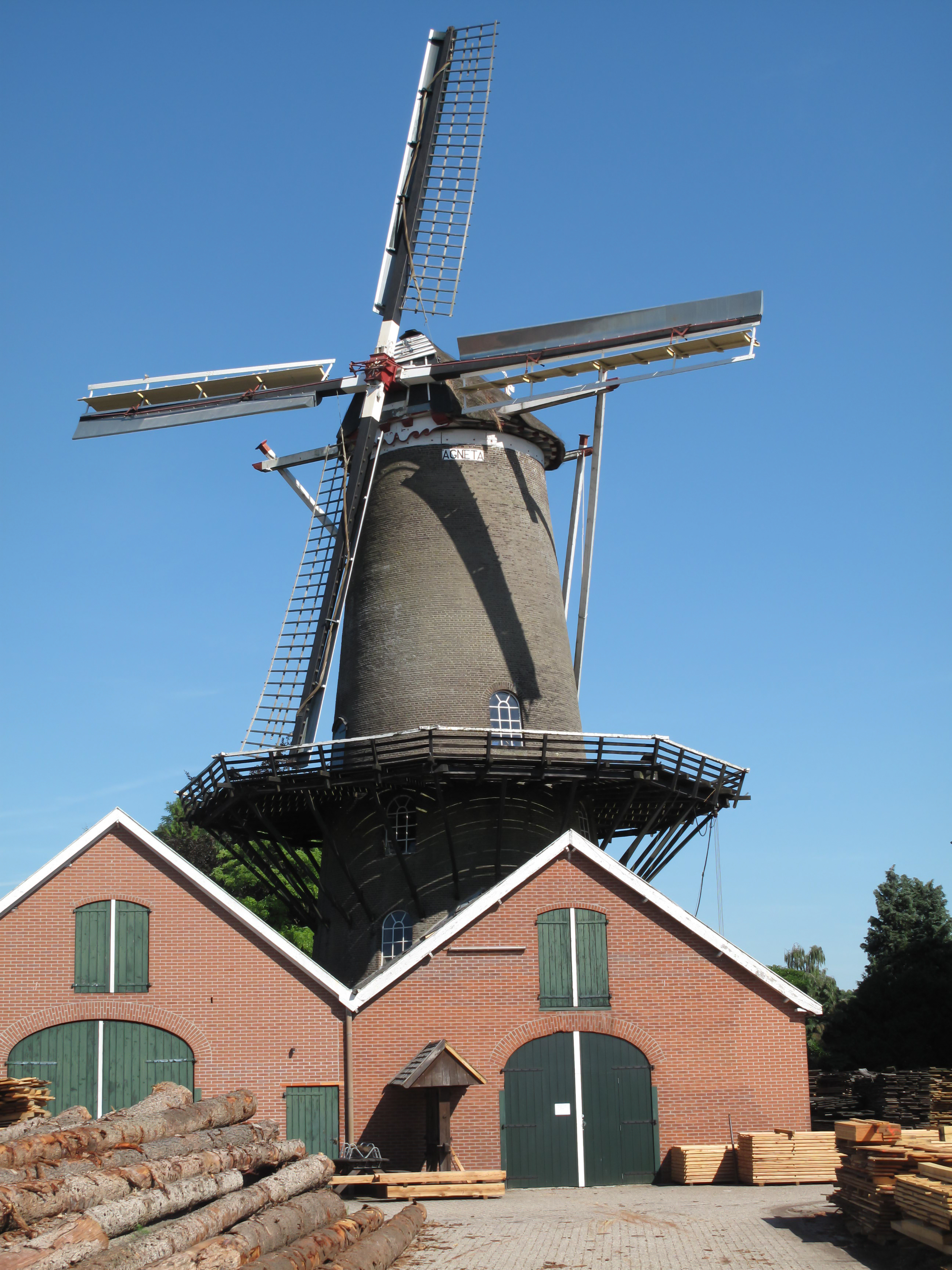
Ruurlo, windmill: sawmill de Agneta

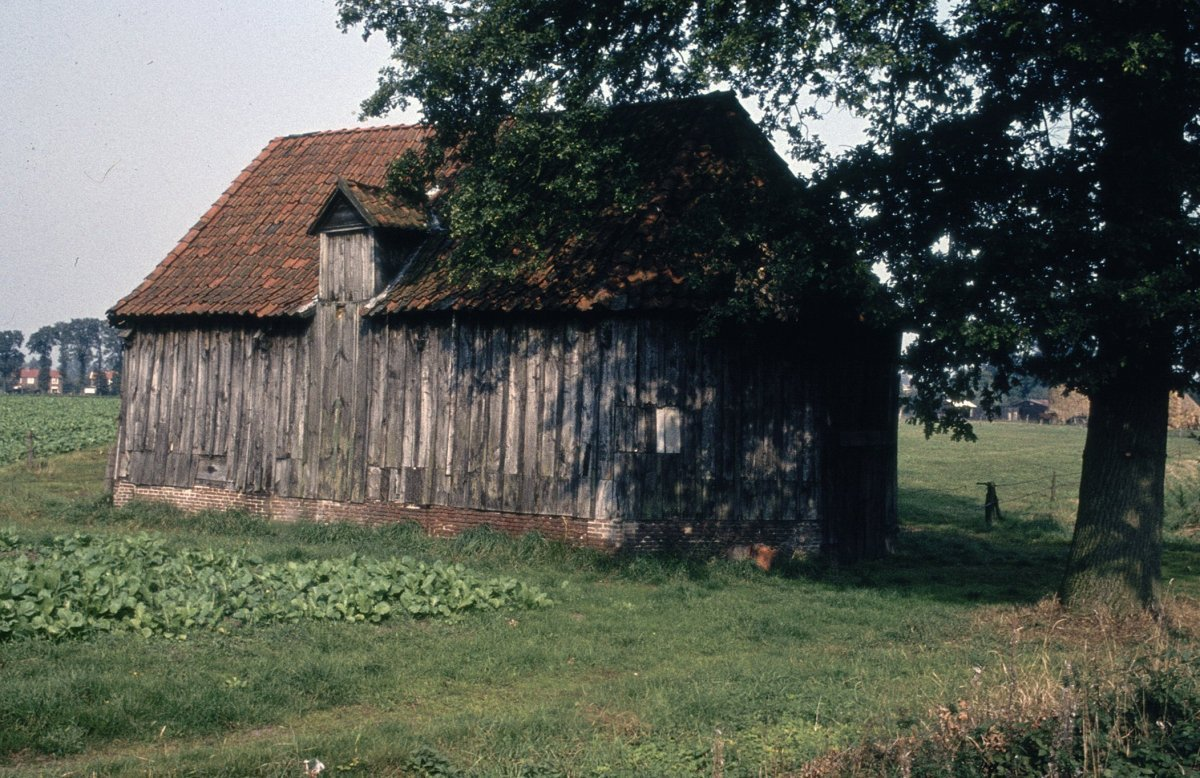
Sheep pen
