= Rietmolen =

- Village
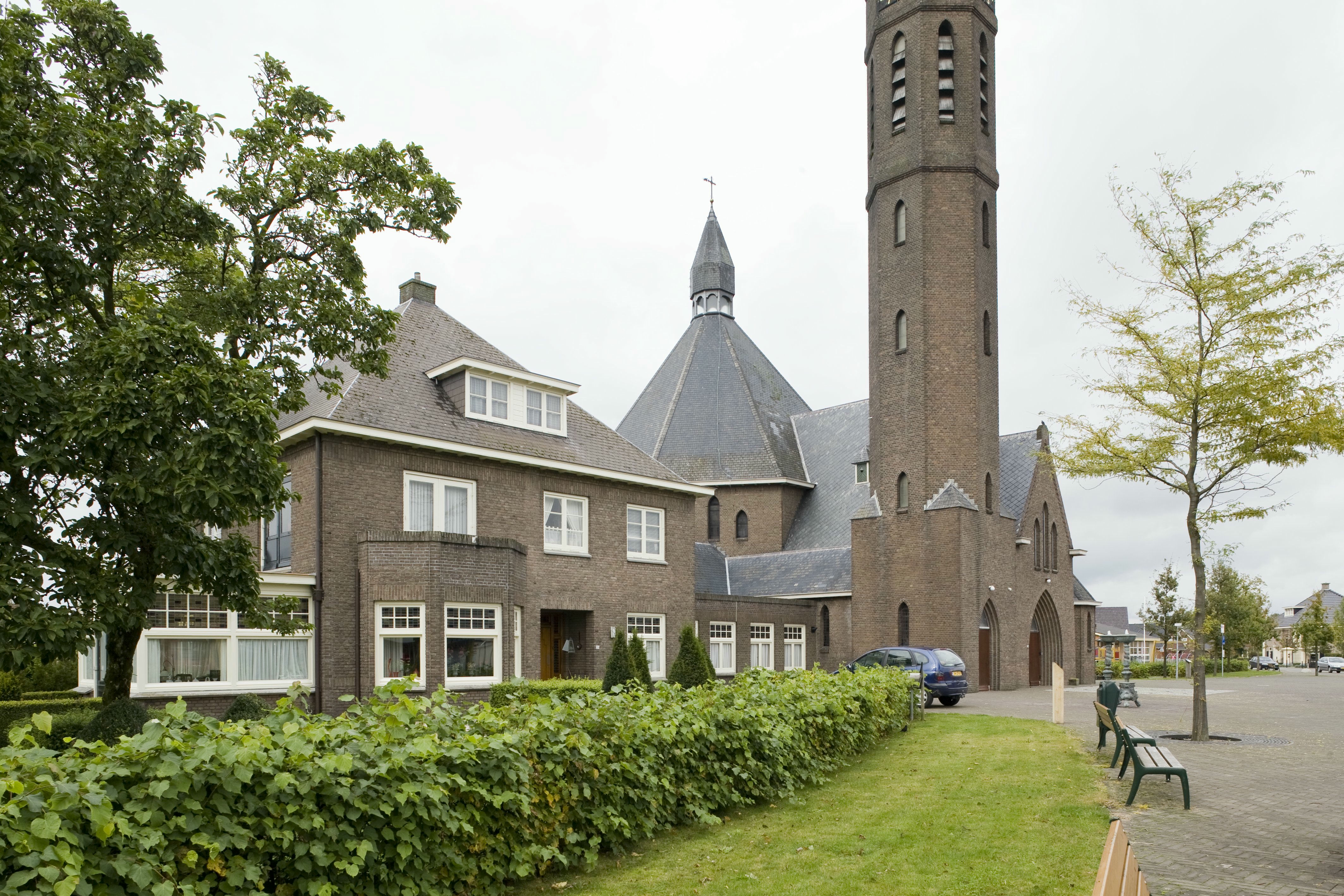
- Church of Rietmolen

- Location in the province of Gelderland Rietmolen (Netherlands)
- Coordinates: 52°5′14″N 6°27′28″E
- Country: Netherlands
- Province: Gelderland
- Municipality: Berkelland

Area
  - Total: 12.24 km^{2} (4.73 sq mi)
- Elevation: 19 m (62 ft)

Population (2021)
  - Total: 1,020
  - Density: 83.3/km^{2} (216/sq mi)
- Time zone: UTC+1 (CET)
  - Summer (DST): UTC+2 (CEST)
- Postal code: 7165
- Dialing code: 0545

Rietmolen is a village in the eastern Netherlands. It is located in the municipality of Berkelland, Gelderland.

It was first mentioned in the 1630s as Rytmuelerbrugh, and means "windmill along a stream". Since 1712, the inn Reetmölle was used as a Catholic church. In 1835, a real church was built. In 1931, construction began on a new church. It was finished in 1933, and has a 45 metres (148 ft) tall slender tower which resembles a minaret.

== Gallery ==
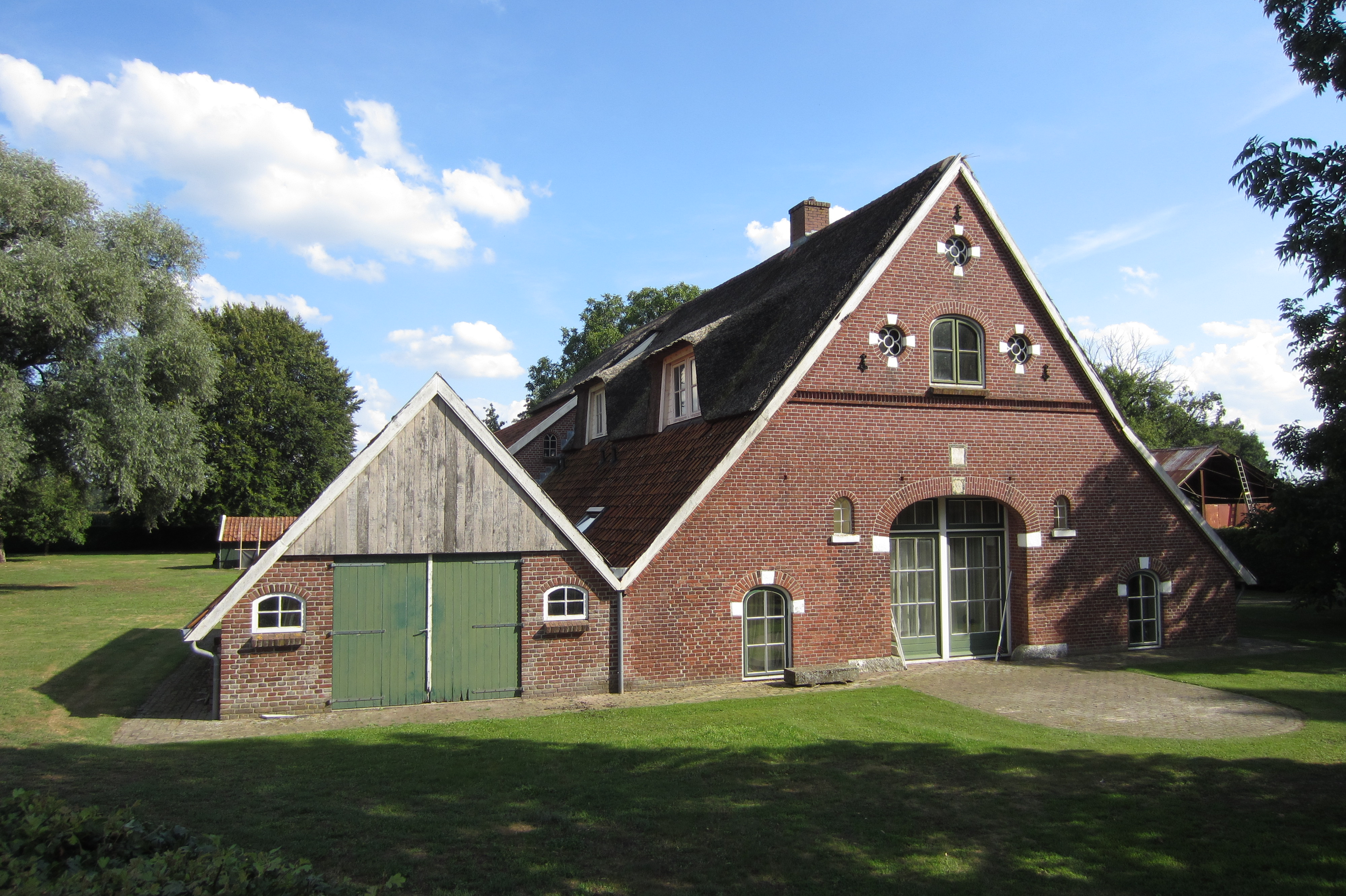
Farm in Rietmolen

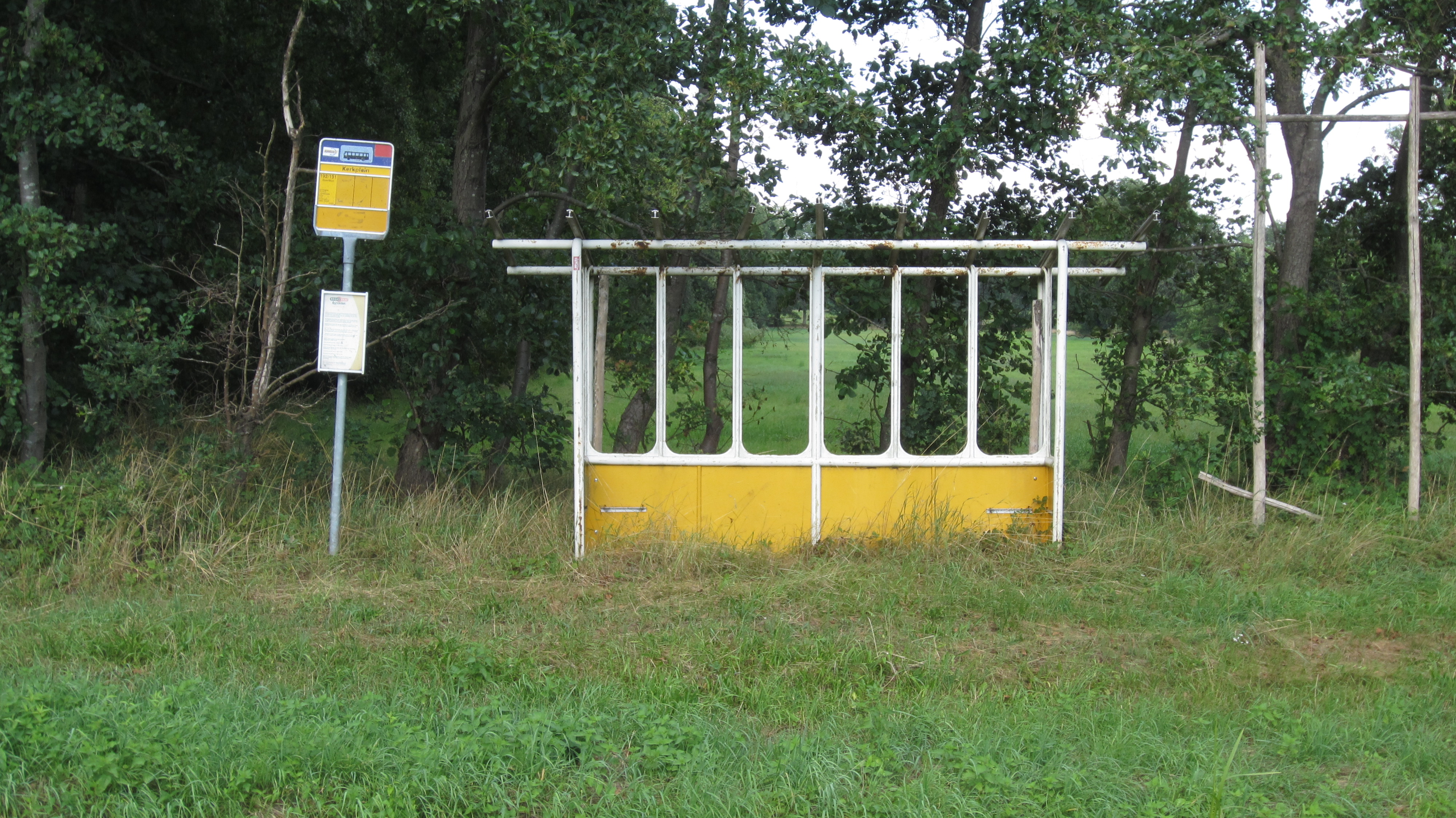
Bus stop

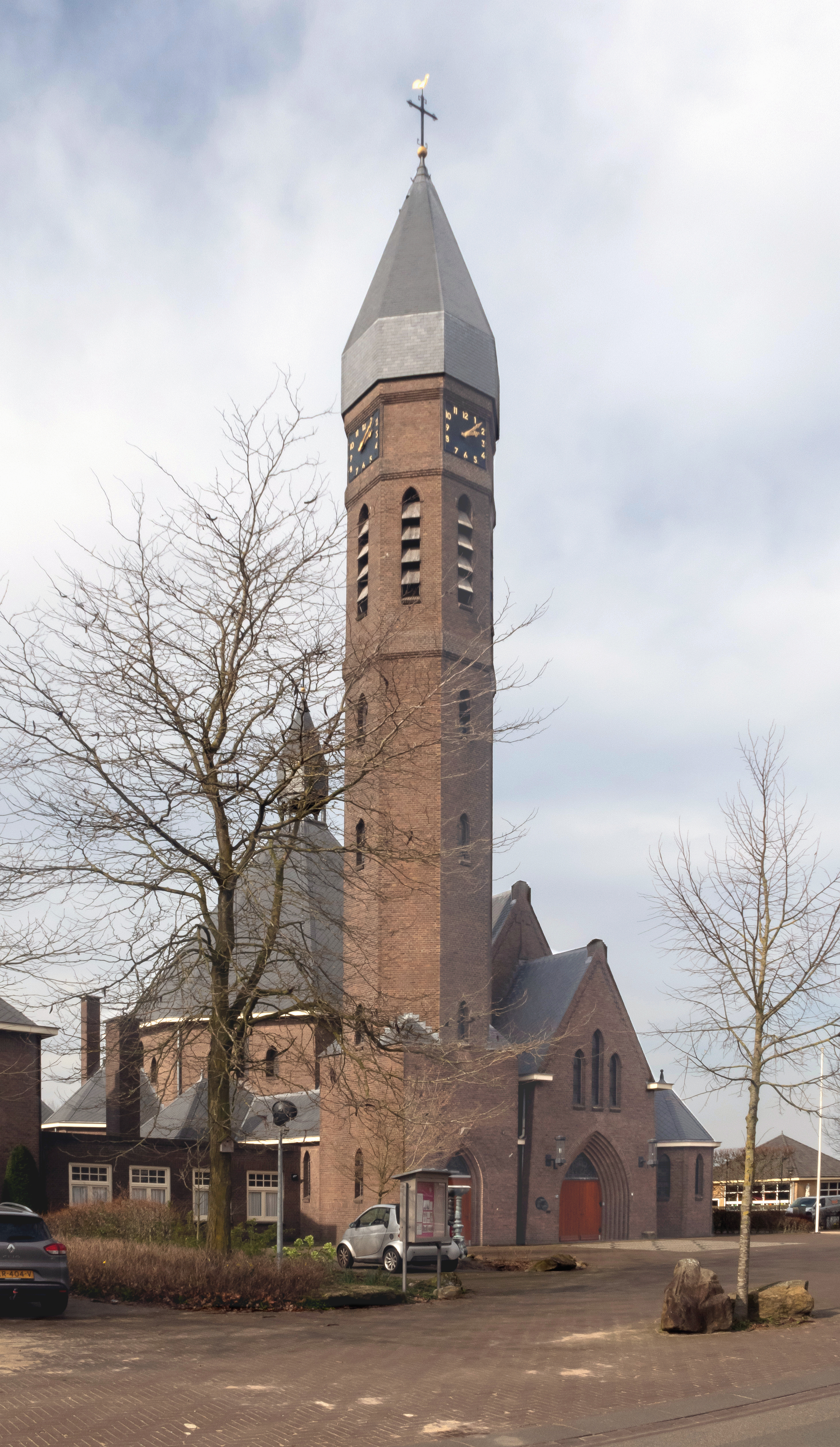
Tower of the church
