= Zsuzsanna Fazekas =

Hungarian midwife and poisoner

- Born: Zsuzsanna Oláh; 20 May 1861; Hungary
- Died: 19 July 1929 (aged 68)
- Occupation: Midwife
- Known for: Murderer

Zsuzsanna Fazekas, known as "Auntie Suzy", (born Zsuzsanna Oláh on 20 May 1861) was a Hungarian midwife who lived during the "Golden Age of Poisoners" and was at the center of the Angel Makers of Nagyrév event (Hungarian: Tiszazugi méregkeverők) in villages in the Tiszántúl region of Hungary. Although she is considered the main actress behind the killing spree, much of the blame was likely placed on her due to the fact that she died before the trial, making her a scapegoat, as the killings began before she arrived and occurred in other areas around her village as well.

== Life in Nagyrév ==
Most accounts of Fazekas begin with her arrival in Nagyrév, where she arrived possessing strong midwifery skills and references, but with little known about her past.

As a midwife in a town with no hospitals, she provided medical care to women, including assistance with childbirth and abortions. She also supported them more broadly as women who were living in a village of a country that housed prisoners of war during World War I, which exposed them to outside influences and different ways of life.

== Mass poisoning ==
When her women patients complained of their violent and drunk husbands, Fazekas said "If there's a problem with him, I have a simple solution". Her solution was to soak flypaper in water, then skim the poison arsenic from the top.

For two decades, Fazekas worked as a midwife as well as a poisoner in the town. As the town's leading medical practitioner, and with a cousin serving in the county clerk who filled out the death certificates, the deaths were able to go bureaucratically unnoticed.

While the number of murders are contested, as well as the individuals behind the spreading of poison, it's a reasonable suspicion to say that she contributed to some of the 45–60 (or up to 300) deaths in the area, which became known collectively as the Angel Makers of Nagyrév and is considered "the greatest female-led mass poisoning in modern history".

== Death ==
It remains unclear how the poisonings were finally uncovered, but when investigators exhumed recently deceased bodies from the local cemetery, they found that 46 of the 50 contained massive traces of arsenic.

The gendarmes began criminal proceedings in July 1920, and turned their sights on Fazekas, approaching her house for her arrest on 19 July 1929. But because she saw the police coming, she was already dead when they arrived; she took some of her own poison.

== Trial and legacy ==
The criminal proceedings took place in July 1929, when dozens of women and two men were arrested and put on trial. There, unable to speak for herself, Fazekas was identified as the central figure behind the poisonings.

The trials also spoke of the nuanced, complicated motivations behind the murders. A woman named Maria said, "I do not feel guilty at all. My husband was a very bad man who beat and tortured me. Since he died, I have found my peace."

== In popular culture ==
- The Angelmakers is a 2006 documentary film by director Astrid Bussink, showcasing local memories of the Angel Makers of Nagyrév event.
- The Women Are Not Fine is a non-fiction book by Hope Reese, which catalogs Zsuzsanna Fazekas's role in Nagyrév.
