= Joint Sigint Cyber Unit =

Dutch government organisation

The Joint Sigint Cyber Unit (JSCU) is a Dutch government organisation, which was founded in 2013 and became operational on June 15, 2014. JSCU's primary tasks are intercepting radio and satellite traffic (Sigint) and obtaining intelligence through cyber-operations. The organisation cooperates closely with allied foreign intelligence agencies.

== General ==
The decision to create a joint intelligence organisation was made in 2011. Preparations for the creation of the JSCU began in late 2012, by a joint team from the General Intelligence and Security Service (AIVD) and the Dutch Military Intelligence and Security Service (MIVD) under the name Project Symbolon. The Joint Sigint Cyber Unit is governed by these two services.

The JSCU headquarters is located in the AIVD building in Zoetermeer, and houses approximately 350 employees. Other JSCU divisions are housed with the MIVD in The Hague.

Before the founding of the JSCU, the Nationale SIGINT Organisatie (NSO) was the organisation tasked with interception of radio and satellite traffic. The NSO also operated under the joint command of the AIVD and MIVD. The NSO formally became part of JSCU when it was created on June 15, 2014.

The JSCU specializes in Sigint and Cyber. Sigint includes intelligence gathered from (tele)communications. AIVD defines 'Cyber' as a group of activities related to computer networks and data streams. Examples given are mapping out the Internet landscape in (new) mission areas, informing allies about dangerous computer viruses, or hacking terrorist websites.

== Interception stations ==
To intercept wireless communication the JSCU operates two interception stations, formerly managed by the NSO: at Burum for the interception of satellite traffic and at Eibergen for the interception of high-frequency radio traffic.

=== Burum ===
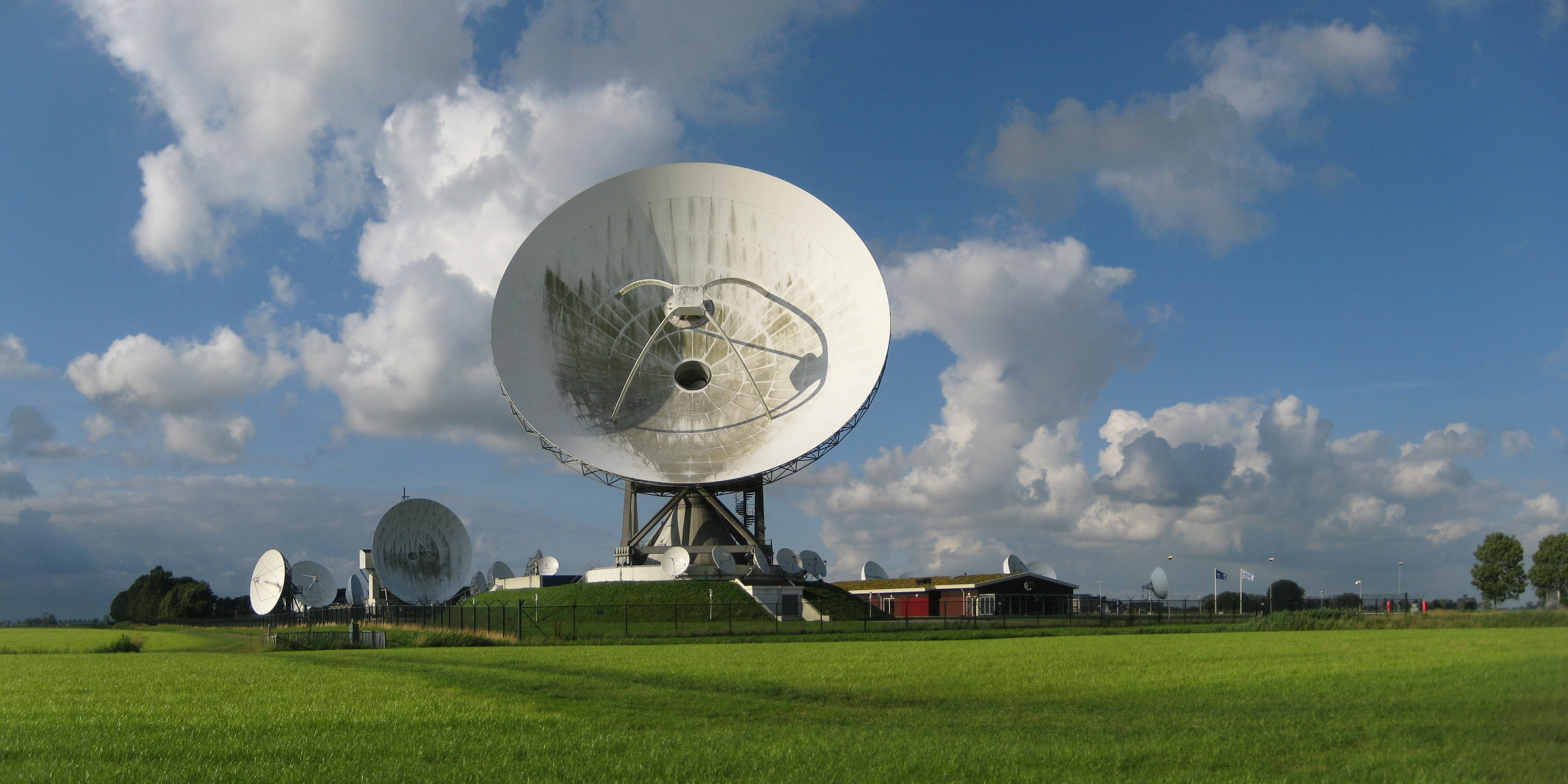
The satellite interception station at It Grutte Ear (The Big Ear) near Burum (2012)

The interception station for satellite traffic is located in Burum (Kollumerland c.a. municipality) in the province of Friesland. It became fully operational in 2006. Construction of this station (officially named 'Satelliet Grondstation Burum') began in 2005 as a replacement for the former ground station in Zoutkamp in northern Groningen.

The telecom operator Stratos (formerly Xantic), operates a satellite ground station (formally Satellite ground station 12, but more commonly known by its nickname: It Grutte Ear (The Big Ear).) near Burum. The NSO interception station was created in the south-eastern corner of the existing Stratos satellite station property. Two large 18m diameter satellite dishes, nine smaller 11m diameter satellite dishes, and four so-called waffle-irons which are 4 meters in diameter were added for Sigint purposes.

=== Eibergen ===
A second JSCU intercept station is located on the military base Kamp Holterhoek in Eibergen in the Achterhoek region. Since 1967 the 898th signal battalion, stationed at Eibergen, has been intercepting radio traffic from the former Eastern Bloc countries. In 1998 the battalion merged with the 1st Air Force signal battalion from Alphen, and part of the Naval Intelligence Service (the Technisch Informatie Verwerkingscentrum) from Eemnes, and became the new Operationeel Verbindings-Inlichtingen Centrum (Operational Signal-Intelligence Centre, OVIC), at Eibergen.

== See also ==
- List of cyber warfare forces
