= The Angelmakers =

- Directed by: Astrid Bussink
- Produced by: Astrid Bussink
- Cinematography: Klara Trenscényi
- Edited by: Brigita Peszleg
- Music by: Jan Schaten
- Distributed by: SZFE Budapest, Edinburgh College of Art
- Release date: 2005
- Running time: 33 minutes
- Countries: Netherlands, United Kingdom, Hungary

The Angelmakers is a 2005 documentary, the debut film of filmmaker Astrid Bussink, which provides insight into the epidemic of arsenic murders by women, known as The Angel Makers of Nagyrév, which brought worldwide attention to the area in 1929. The documentary won the First Appearance competition at the International Documentary Film Festival Amsterdam, as well as several other awards.

The film is shot on location in the rural Hungarian village of Nagyrév, alternating between portraits of the surrounding landscape and first-hand narrations by the elderly inhabitants.

Some women poisoned unwanted husbands based on their oppression, drunkenness or laziness, some because the wives had taken lovers, some because the husbands had returned home disabled from World War I. Unwanted babies were also poisoned. A web of stories unfolds through the characters' memories which recapture old but ever-lasting tales of life, death and the struggle between the two sexes. One of them is the midwife's story as well as one of the narrators' revelation that the 'flypaper' murders were a widespread practice not only in the particular area but on a national level. The film tries to give some insight in the domestic battles that the women of the village have to fight.
