= Bussink =

Bussink is a surname. Notable people with the surname include:

- Astrid Bussink (born 1975), Dutch filmmaker
- Ronald Bussink, Ferris wheel designer
