= Windlust, Burum =

Windmill in Burum, Netherlands

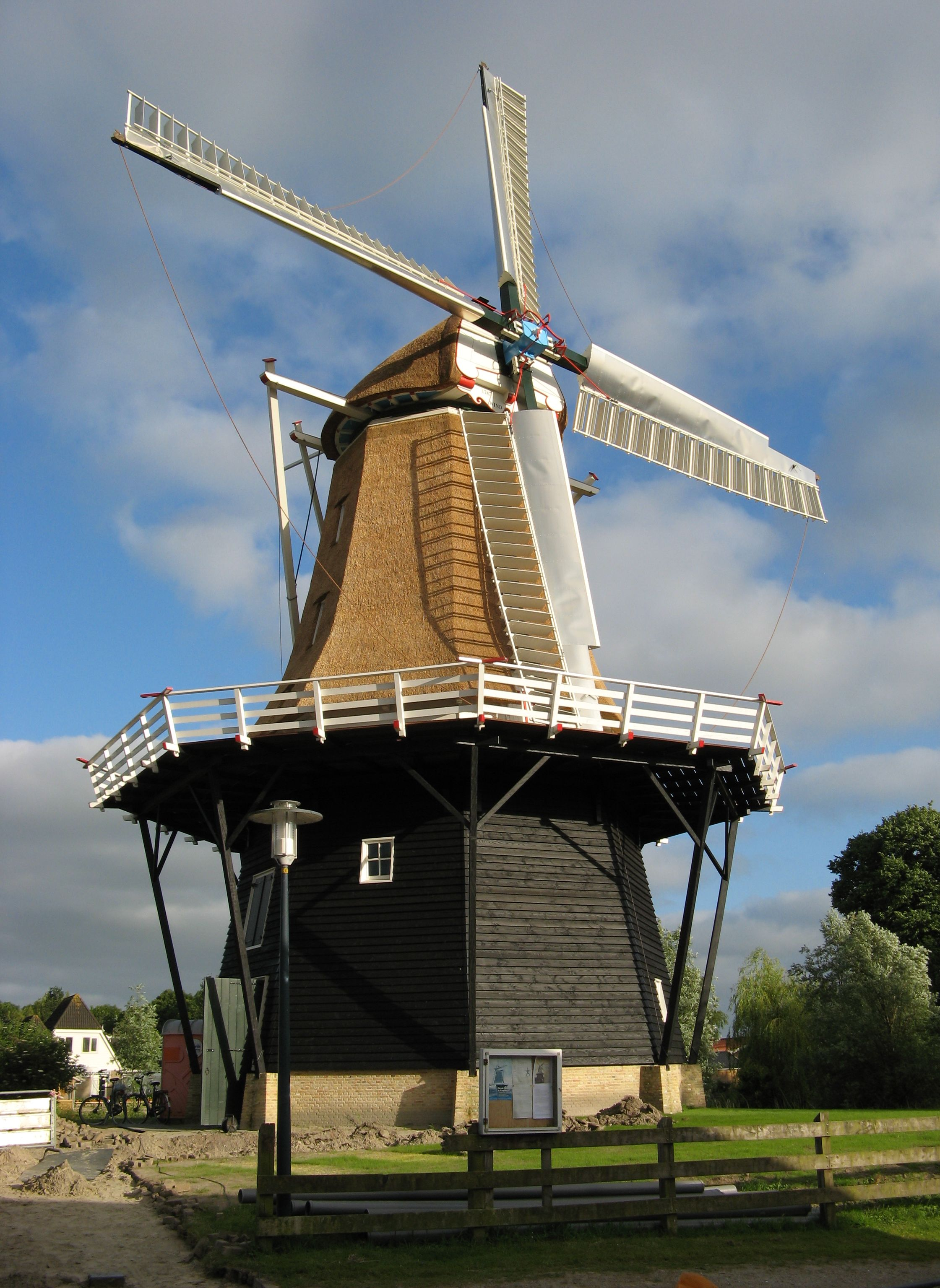
- Windlust, June 2014
- Interactive map of Windlust, Burum

Origin
- Mill name: Windlust
- Coordinates: 53°16′27″N 6°13′55″E
- Operators: Stichting Erfgoed Kollumerland & Nieuwkruisland
- Year built: 2014

Information
- Purpose: Corn mill and Barley mill
- Type: Smock mill
- Storeys: Three-storey smock
- Base storeys: Three-storey base
- Smock sides: Eight sides
- No. of sails: Four sails
- Type of sails: Patent sails with Dekkerised leading edges
- Windshaft: Cast iron
- Winding: Tailpole and winch

Windlust is a smock mill in Burum, Friesland, Netherlands which was built in 2014, replacing an earlier mill that had burnt down on 8 April 2012.

== History ==
A windmill was recorded at Burum in 1578. The next mention of a mill at Burum was in 1711. This mill burnt down on 12 October 1785. In 1787 a new mill was built to replace it. Reinder Durks Hamming was the owner-miller from 1811 to 1832 and Harmannus Habbema was the owner-miller from c1860 until his death in 1881. Eelke de Kok of Buitenpost took the mill in 1888, working it until 1905 when his nephew Thijs Berends took over. In 1941 the mill was taken by J Bremer.

The mill was restored in 1946, 1957, 1969 and 1975. In 1997, the mill was sold by the Bremers to the Gemeente Kollummerland. A further restoration was completed in 2000, the mill being officially reopened on 6 May - Nationale Molendag. The mill was completely rethatched in 2007. The mill was listed as a Rijksmonument, number 23744.

In the late evening of Easter Sunday 2012 the mill caught fire and was ablaze when the fire brigade arrived. About half an hour after the fire had started the mill collapsed. Following a police enquiry six boys aged 12 to 14 years were apprehended for causing the fire. The mill was insured for €1.45 million.

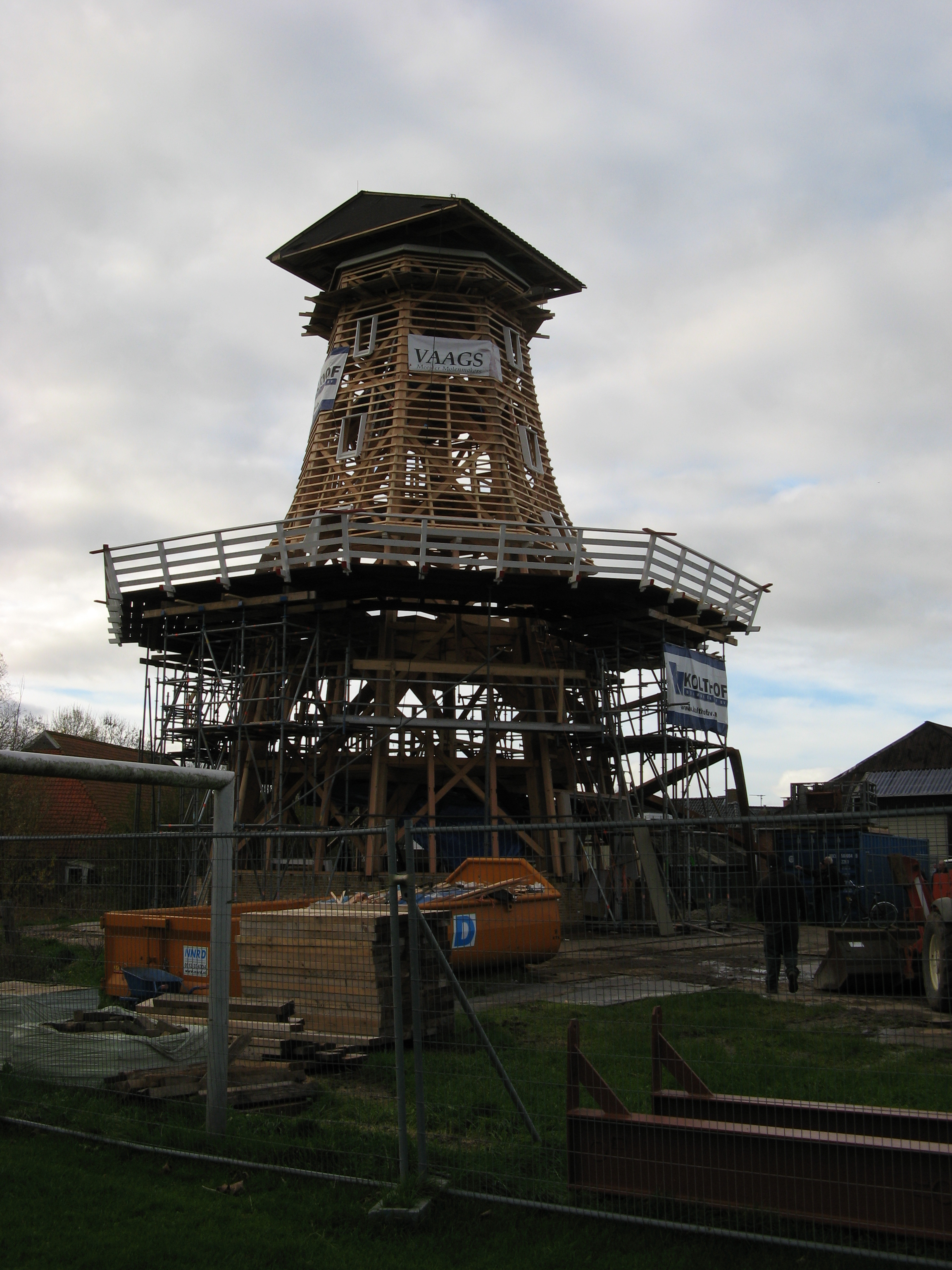
Windlust being rebuilt, 15 November 2013

Following the fire, the mill was rebuilt. Work started in July 2013 and was completed in June 2014. The replacement mill is not listed as a Rijksmonument.

== Description ==
The 1757-built Windlust was what the Dutch describe as a "stellingmolen" . It was a three-storey smock mill with a stage on a three-storey base. The base was wooden, on a low brick foundation. The stage was at third-floor level, 6.10 metres (20 ft 0 in) above ground level. The mill was winded by tailpole and winch. The four Patent sails, which had a span of 21.00 metres (68 ft 11 in), were carried in a cast-iron windshaft which was cast by Prins van Oranje, The Hague in 1892. The windshaft also carried the brake wheel which had 67 cogs. This drove the wallower (34 cogs) at the top of the upright shaft. At the bottom of the upright shaft, the great spur wheel (103 cogs) drove a pair of 1.40 metres (4 ft 7 in) diameter French Burr millstones via a lantern pinion stone nut with 27 staves. A second pair of 1.40 metres (4 ft 7 in) diameter French Burr millstones were driven via a lantern pinion stone nut with 31 staves. The two pairs of millstones used for producing pearl barley were driven by lantern pinion stone nuts with 20 and 21 staves respectively.

The 2014-built mill has a windshaft cast by the Nijmeegsche IJzergieterij. It is 4.67 metres (15 ft 4 in) long and carries a brakewheel with 66 cogs. The sails span 22.00 metres (72 ft 2 in).

== Millers ==
- Reinder Durks Hamming (1811–32)
- Hermanus Habbema (c1860-81)
- Eelke de Kok (1888-1905)
- Thijs Berends (1905–41)
- J Bremer (1941- )

Reference for above:-
