= World Police Indoor Soccer Tournament =

The World Police Indoor Soccer Tournament (WPIST) is an international futsal tournament for police officers since 1982. In the early 1980s the Eibergen Police department took the initiative to have a tournament with their German colleagues, to improve their cooperation. The tournament grew to be a European, and later a worldwide event.

== See also ==
- World Firefighters Games
- Military World Games
- World Police and Fire Games
