= Hope Reese =

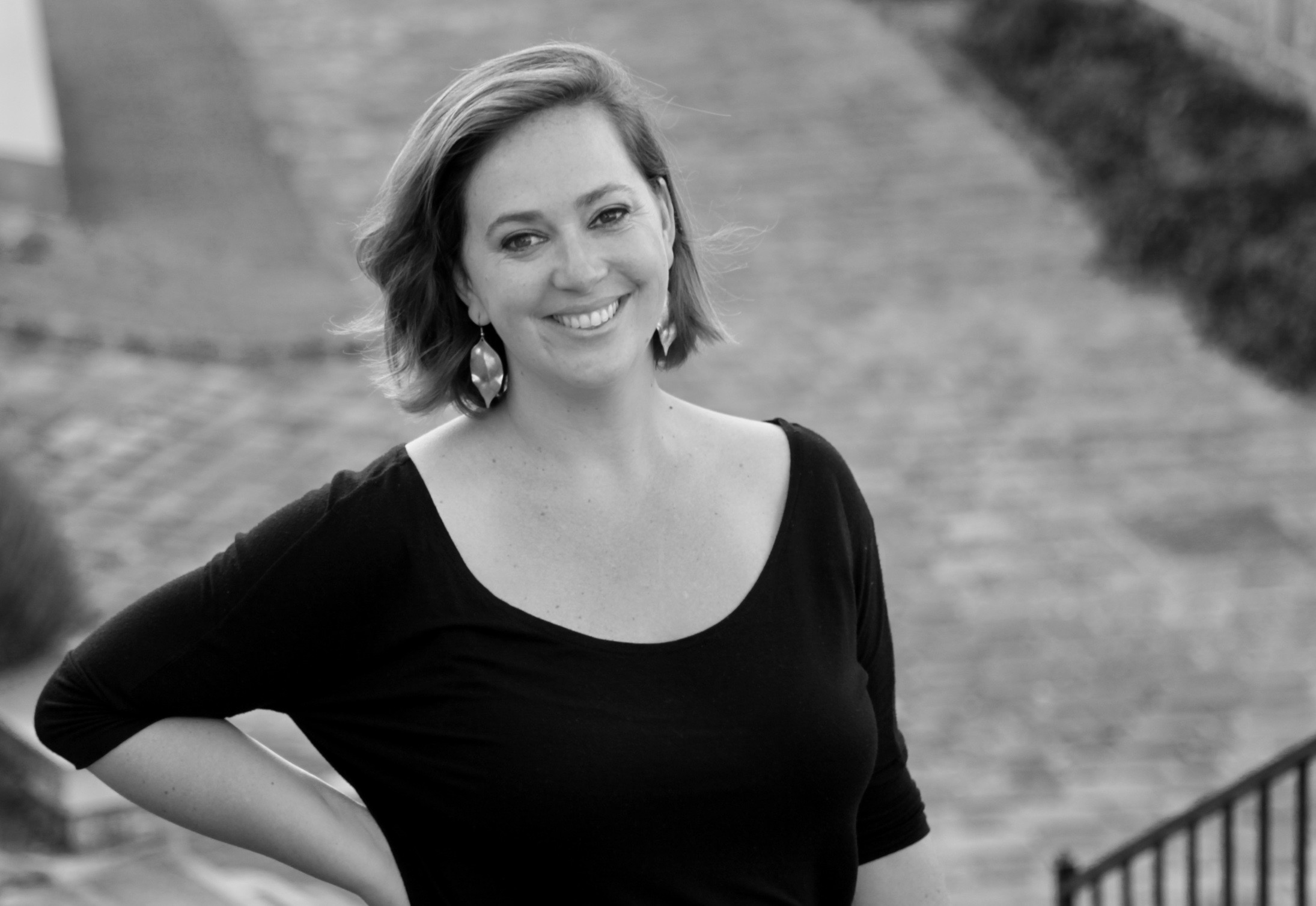
Hope Reese in 2021

Hope Reese is an American journalist and nonfiction author based in Budapest, Hungary. She is the author of The Women Are Not Fine: The Dark History of a Poisonous Sisterhood (2025), published by Brazen Books, an imprint of Hachette UK, and a featured author in Where Freedom Starts: Sex Power Violence #MeToo, published by Verso Books in 2018.

== Early life and education ==
Reese grew up in Southampton, New York. She studied psychology at Bowdoin College and earned a Master of Liberal Arts in journalism from Harvard Extension School.

== Career ==
Reese has contributed to publications including The New York Times, The Atlantic, Vox, The Boston Globe, and the Chicago Tribune. From 2015 to 2017, she was a staff writer at TechRepublic. In 2016, her article using artificial intelligence to predict the Kentucky Derby superfecta attracted coverage from Newsweek, CBS News, and ESPN.

=== The Women Are Not Fine ===
The Women Are Not Fine examines a series of early 20th-century arsenic poisonings in rural Hungary, known as the "angel makers of Nagyrév" case, in which a midwife distributed poison to local women who killed their husbands. The book was reviewed by The Telegraph, the Literary Review, and Könyves Magazin. Foyles listed it among its Top 10 Reads for July 2025. The book was featured on BBC Radio 4's Woman's Hour, The Irish Times Women's Podcast, and ABC Radio National's Nightlife, where Reese discussed the case and her research.
