= Menno ter Braak =

Dutch writer (1902–1940)

- Born: 26 January 1902; Eibergen, Netherlands
- Died: 14 May 1940 (aged 38); The Hague, Netherlands
- Education: University of Amsterdam
- Occupation: Author
- Years active: 1923-1940

Menno ter Braak (26 January 1902 – 14 May 1940) was a Dutch modernist writer, critic, essayist, and journalist.

== Early career ==
Ter Braak was born in Eibergen and grew up in the town of Tiel where he was an exemplary student. He went on to the University of Amsterdam where he majored in Dutch and History. He was a regular contributor to the student magazine Propria Cures and involved himself in the study of film (then a very young discipline).

Together with Joris Ivens, Menno ter Braak was also a founder of the Filmliga (Movie League), an organisation for the study of animated film. He completed a Ph.D. dissertation on the medieval emperor Otto III and consecutively worked as a teacher in a number of secondary schools, lastly in Rotterdam.

== Forum movement ==
In 1932 ter Braak, together with Eddy du Perron and Maurice Roelants, started the literary magazine Forum which proved to be one of the most important literary periodicals in the Dutch-speaking world (it expressly involved Flemish intellectuals as well) in the nineteen-thirties. Forum is widely considered a bulwark of cultural elitism, advocating a high cultural level of discourse, a rational form of literary criticism, consequent individualism and a stern disapproval of all intellectual ornamentation. "Vent boven vorm" (loosely translated: 'personality over form') was the catchword of the Forum movement, and Multatuli was one of its most important paragons.

== Political involvement ==
In 1933 ter Braak married Ant Faber, daughter of the social-democratic member of parliament and reverend Jan Lambertus Faber. They moved to The Hague, where Ter Braak joined the Dutch liberal daily Het Vaderland (the Fatherland) as a literary affairs editor and was one of the first Dutchmen to understand the looming threat of Nazism. It is in these years that he started het Comité van Waakzaamheid (the Committee for Vigilance). As a public intellectual, he is most famous for his essays, most of which deal with European culture, politics, or a mixture of the two. He is distinctly influenced by Nietzsche and his style is deliberately paradoxical.

== Later writing ==
In his last, and best-known essays he chastises those who would subject themselves to "higher" and "spiritual" values, unmasking the hierarchies behind those values who are working to further their own agenda. Against this subjection to extraneous authorities and false values, ter Braak posits the individualist ideal of the honnête homme, the "Man of Integrity" who will not conform himself to other people's expectations and systems.

A born polemicist, he managed to find himself a diverse group of opponents and by the end of his life had entered into polemics, some of which were hostile with the self-proclaimed representatives of what he considered to be "nebulous collectivisms" such as Catholicism, liberal humanism, Marxism and fascism.

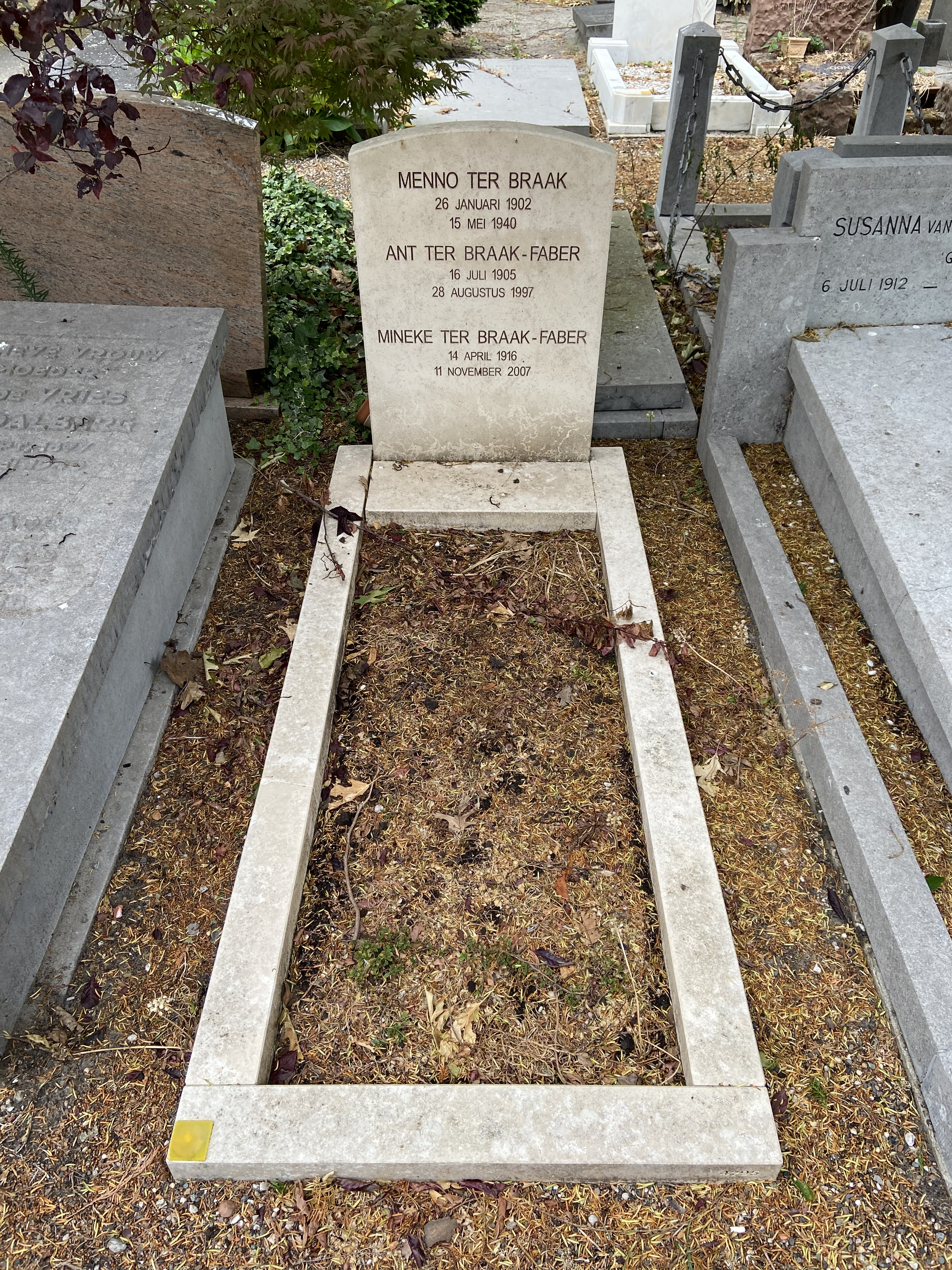
Ter Braak's place of burial at the Oud Eik en Duinen graveyard in The Hague, Netherlands

== Death ==
Towards the end of his life he became increasingly involved in the growing anti-fascist movement in the Netherlands. When the Second World War broke out in 1939 he fell into a deep depression. Four days after Nazi Germany had invaded the Netherlands, on 14 May 1940, the Luftwaffe carpet-bombed his former hometown Rotterdam. Earlier that day, ter Braak and his wife had made a half-hearted attempt to find out if they could flee to England by boat from the port of Scheveningen, only to learn that under the circumstances such a trip was prohibitively expensive. When the Dutch army's supreme command announced capitulation in the late afternoon, Menno and Ant ter Braak went to the house of Menno's brother Wim and Ant's half-sister Mineke, also in The Hague. There, Menno ter Braak committed suicide by using a sedative, combined with an injection of poison (most likely administered by his brother, who was a neurologist). Coincidentally, his friend du Perron died at about the same time from a heart attack caused by angina pectoris.

Menno ter Braak's influence remained fairly large and lasted well into the 1950s; during the fifties his influence began to wane but a number of literary periodicals, especially Libertinage and Tirade remained faithful to a number of ter Braak's ideas.

== Bibliography ==
- 1928 - Kaiser Otto III. Ideal und Praxis im frühen Mittelalter (Ph.D. dissertation)
- 1929 - Cinema militans (essay)
- 1930 - Het carnaval der burgers. Een gelijkenis in gelijkenissen (essay) (The Burghers' Carnival. A Parable in Parables)
- 1931 - De absolute film (essay) (The Absolute Film)
- 1931 - Afscheid van domineesland (essay) (Saying Goodbye to the Country of Pastors)
- 1931 - Hampton Court (novel)
- 1931 - Man tegen man (essay) (Man to Man)
- 1932 - Démasqué der schoonheid (essay) (Démasqué of Beauty)
- 1932-1935 - Forum Maandschrift voor letteren en kunst (magazine) (Forum, magazine for literature and the arts)
- 1933 - Dr. Dumay verliest... (novel) (Dr. Dumay Loses)
- 1934 - Politicus zonder partij (essay) (Politician without Party)
- 1935 - De pantserkrant. Een tragicomedie van wapens, schrijfmachines en idealen. Gevolgd door een brief aan een vijandin van het tooneel (play) (The Armoured Newspaper; a tragicomedy of Arms, Typewriters and Ideals, Followed by a Letter to an Enemy of the Theatre)
- 1935 - Het tweede gezicht (essays) (The Second Face)
- 1937 - Douwes Dekker en Multatuli (essay) (Douwes Dekker and Multatuli)
- 1937 - Van oude en nieuwe Christenen (essay) (Of Old and New Christians)
- 1937 - Het Christendom. Twee getuigenissen in polemische vorm (essays) (Christianity, two testimonies in polemical form) (with Anton van Duinkerken as co-author)
- 1937 - Het nationaal-socialisme als rancuneleer (essay) (National-Socialism as a Doctrine of Resentment)
- 1938 - In gesprek met de vorigen (essay) (Talking with the Predecessors)
- 1938 - Mephistophelisch (essay) (Mephistophelian)
- 1938 - De Augustijner monnik en zijn trouwe duivel (essay) (The Augustinian Monk and his loyal Devil)
- 1939 - De nieuwe elite (essay) (The New Elite)
- 1943 - De duivelskunstenaar. Een studie over S. Vestdijk (essay) (The Devil's artist, a study on S. Vestdijk)
- 1944 - Reinaert op reis (essays) (Reinaert on the Move)
- 1945 - Over waardigheid en macht. Politiek-cultureele kroniek (essay) (On Truth and Dignity, a political-cultural Chronicle)
- 1945 - Journaal 1939 (diary) (Journal 1939)
- 1946 - In gesprek met de onzen (essay) (Talking to one's Own)
- 1949 - Briefwisseling Ter Braak - Du Perron. Een bloemlezing (Selected Correspondence between Ter Braak and Du Perron)
- 1949-1951 - Verzameld werk (seven volumes) (Collected Works)
- 1962-1967 - Briefwisseling 1930-1940 (correspondence) (Correspondence between Menno ter Braak and Edgar du Perron, four volumes)
- 1965 - Het verraad der vlaggen (essays) (The Treason of the Flags)
- 1978 - De Propria Curesartikelen. 1923-1925 (The articles from Propria Cures)
- 1980 - De artikelen over emigrantenliteratuur. 1933-1940 (Articles on Migrant Literature)
- 1992 - De draagbare Ter Braak (The Portable ter Braak)
