= Nationale SIGINT Organisatie =

Dutch signals intelligence organisation

Coordinates: 53°17′0″N 6°12′50″E

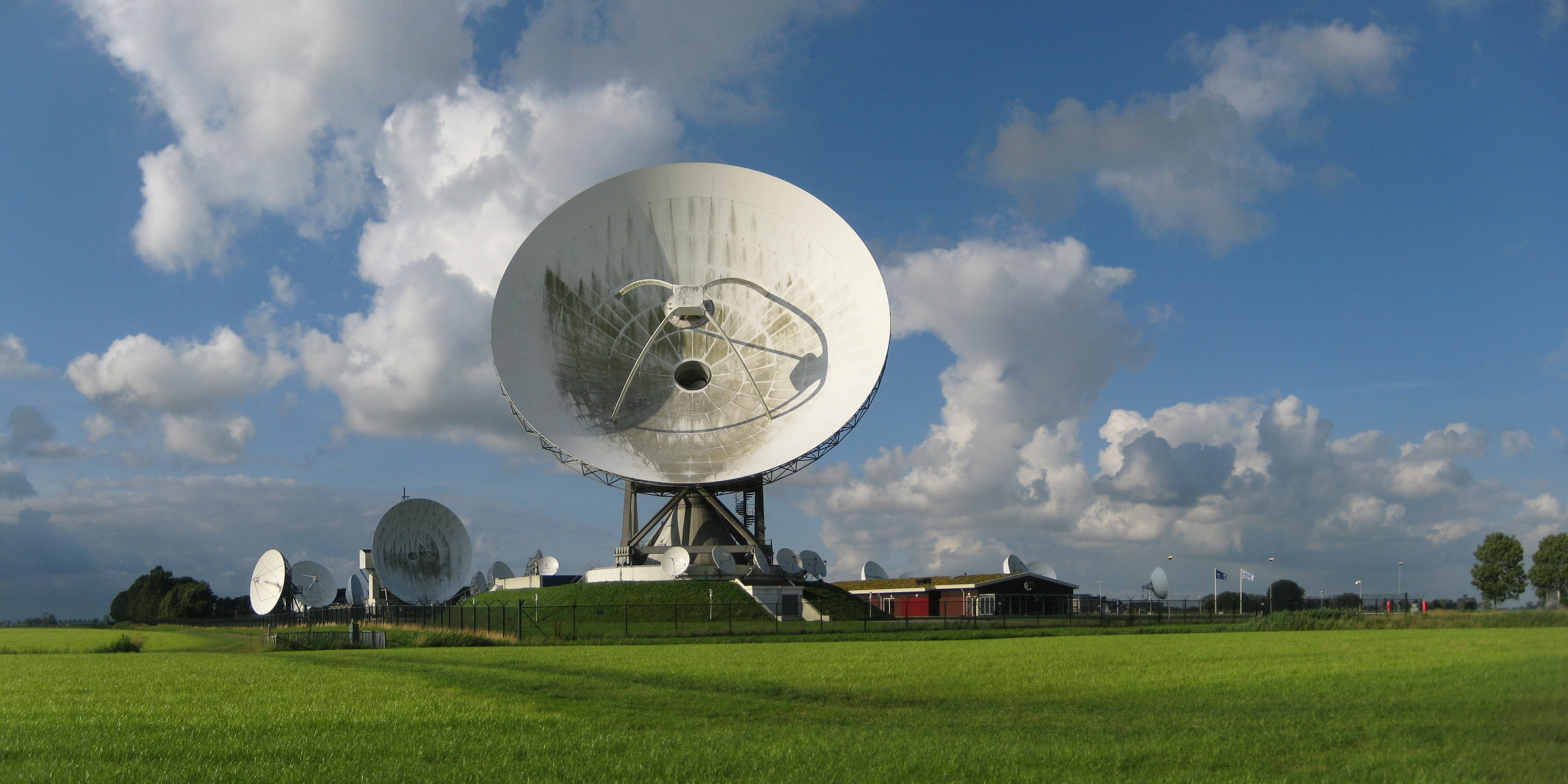
NSO ground station in It Greate Ear (NL, officially Satellietgrondstation 12) in Burum in 2012

The Nationale SIGINT Organisatie (NSO) was the Dutch signals intelligence (SIGINT) organisation, which was part of the Ministry of Defence, but worked for both the military intelligence and security agency MIVD as for its civilian counterpart AIVD.

The NSO was established in 2003, in the aftermath of the September 11, 2001 attacks and became fully operational in 2007. Early 2014, the NSO merged into the newly created Joint Sigint Cyber Unit (JSCU).

The facilities of the NSO were a high frequency radio interception station in Eibergen in the Berkelland municipality, and a satellite ground station in Burum in the Kollumerland c.a. municipality. There are also some mobile SIGINT units which can be deployed at military operations abroad. The operation of both listening stations and the mobile units has been taken over by the JSCU.
