= Nagyrév =

- Village
- Coat of arms

- Location within Hungary
- Coordinates: 46°56′31″N 20°08′57″E
- Country: Hungary
- County: Jász-Nagykun-Szolnok
- District: Kunszentmárton

Area
  - Total: 29.79 km^{2} (11.50 sq mi)

Population (2001)
  - Total: 872
  - Density: 29.27/km^{2} (75.8/sq mi)
- Time zone: UTC+1 (CET)
  - Summer (DST): UTC+2 (CEST)
- Postal code: 5463
- Area code(s): (+36) 56

Nagyrév is a village in Jasz-Nagykun-Szolnok, central Hungary. It was the location of the Nagyrév culture.

Between 1914 and 1929, a large group of female villagers calling themselves "the Angel Makers of Nagyrév" systematically poisoned to death an estimated 45–50 people.
