= Burum, Friesland =

Burum Boerum
- Village
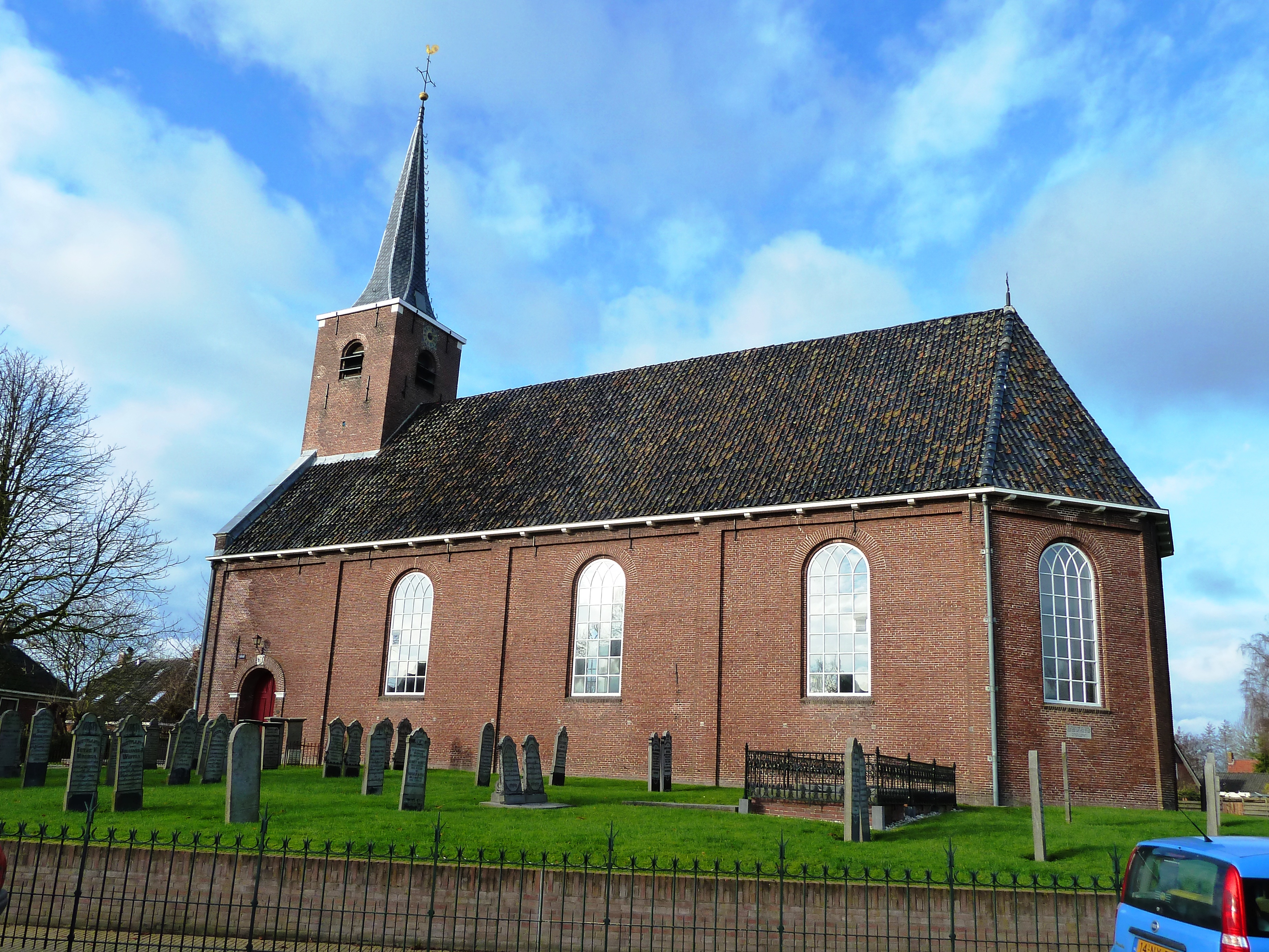
- Church in Burum

- Flag Coat of arms

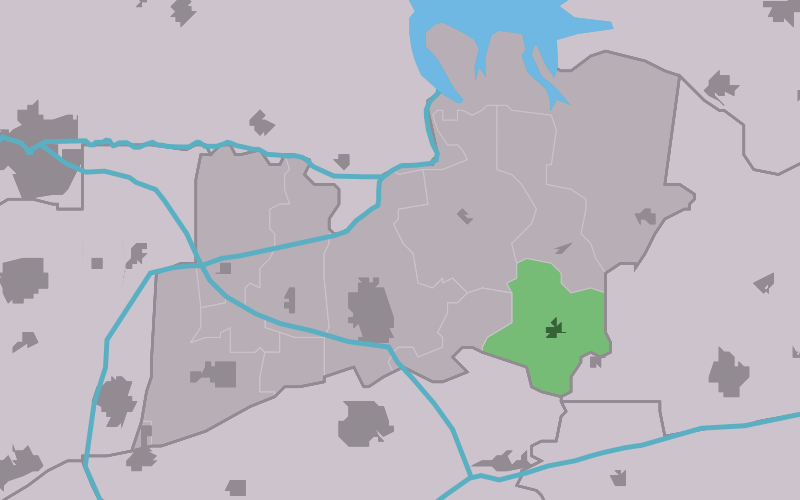
- Location in the former Kollumerland municipality

- Location in the Netherlands Burum (Netherlands)
- Country: Netherlands
- Province: Friesland
- Municipality: Noardeast-Fryslân

Area
  - Total: 8.87 km^{2} (3.42 sq mi)
- Elevation: 1.5 m (4.9 ft)

Population (2021)
  - Total: 620
  - Density: 70/km^{2} (180/sq mi)
- Time zone: UTC+1 (CET)
  - Summer (DST): UTC+2 (CEST)
- Postal code: 9851
- Dialing code: 0594

Burum (West Frisian language: Boerum) is a village in Noardeast-Fryslân municipality, Friesland in the Netherlands.

It is the site of a ground station of the Dutch Nationale SIGINT Organisatie (national signals intelligence service), which intercepts satellite communications. Burum also provides reference signals for Enhanced Automatic Frequency Correction, which help calibrates satellite communications.

It had a population of 606 in January 2017.

== History ==
The village was first mentioned in 1408 as Burum, and means neighbourhood. Burum is a terp (artificial living mound) village. An output of the monastery of Gerkesklooster was established near the village. During the 13th or 14th century the area around Burum was poldered. The Dutch Reformed church was built in 1784 as a replacement of a medieval church.

The grist mill Windlust was built in 1787 near Burum. In 2012, it burnt down and in 2014, a near identical new wind mill was built. The windmill is operation, but only on a voluntary basis.

In 1840, Burum was home to 1,121 people. In 1973, the satellite communication centre It Grutte Ear opened near Burum. In 2014, the ground station of the Dutch national signals intelligence service was added to the site.

== Gallery ==
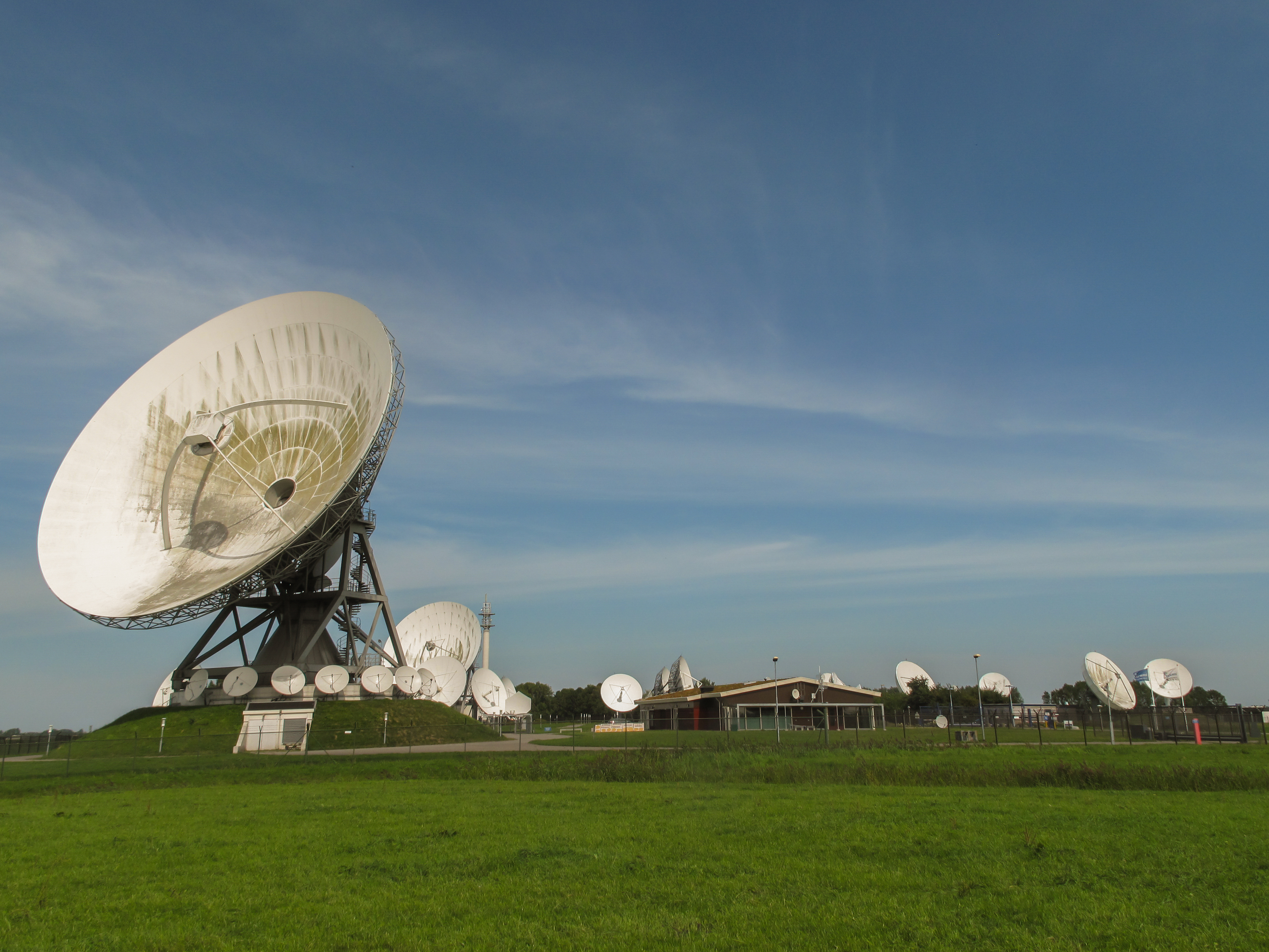
NSO ground station

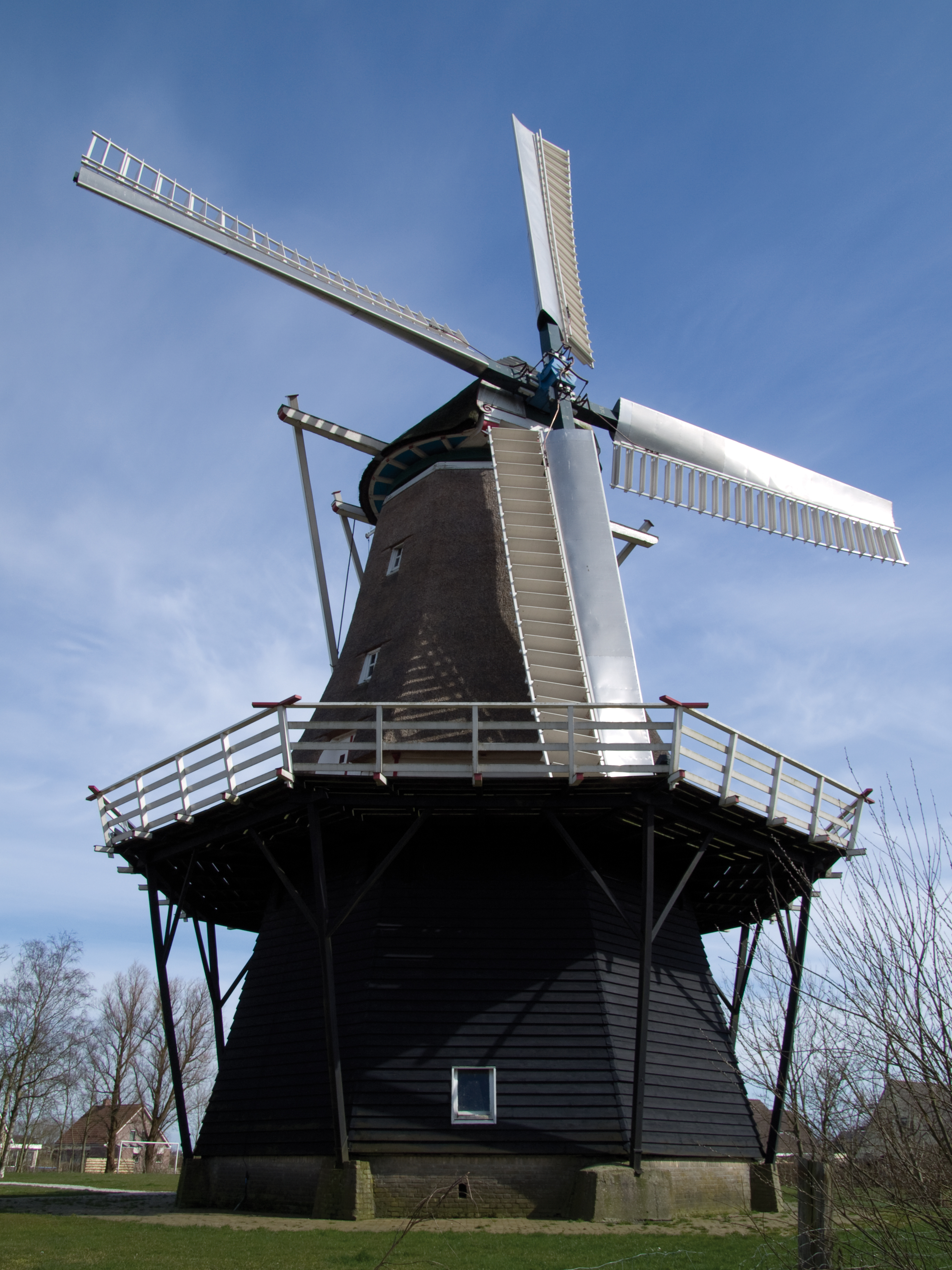
Windmill Windlust

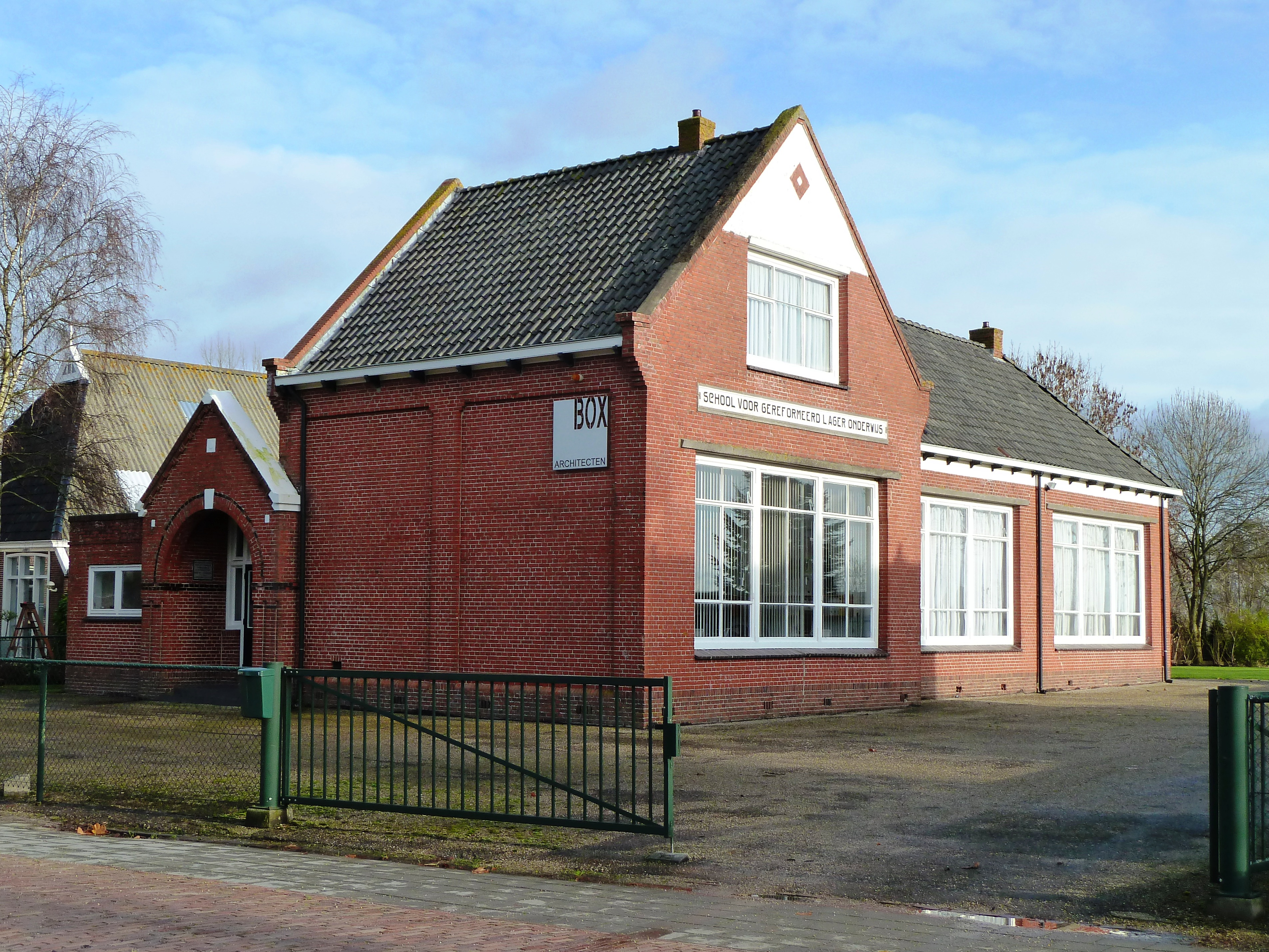
School in Burum

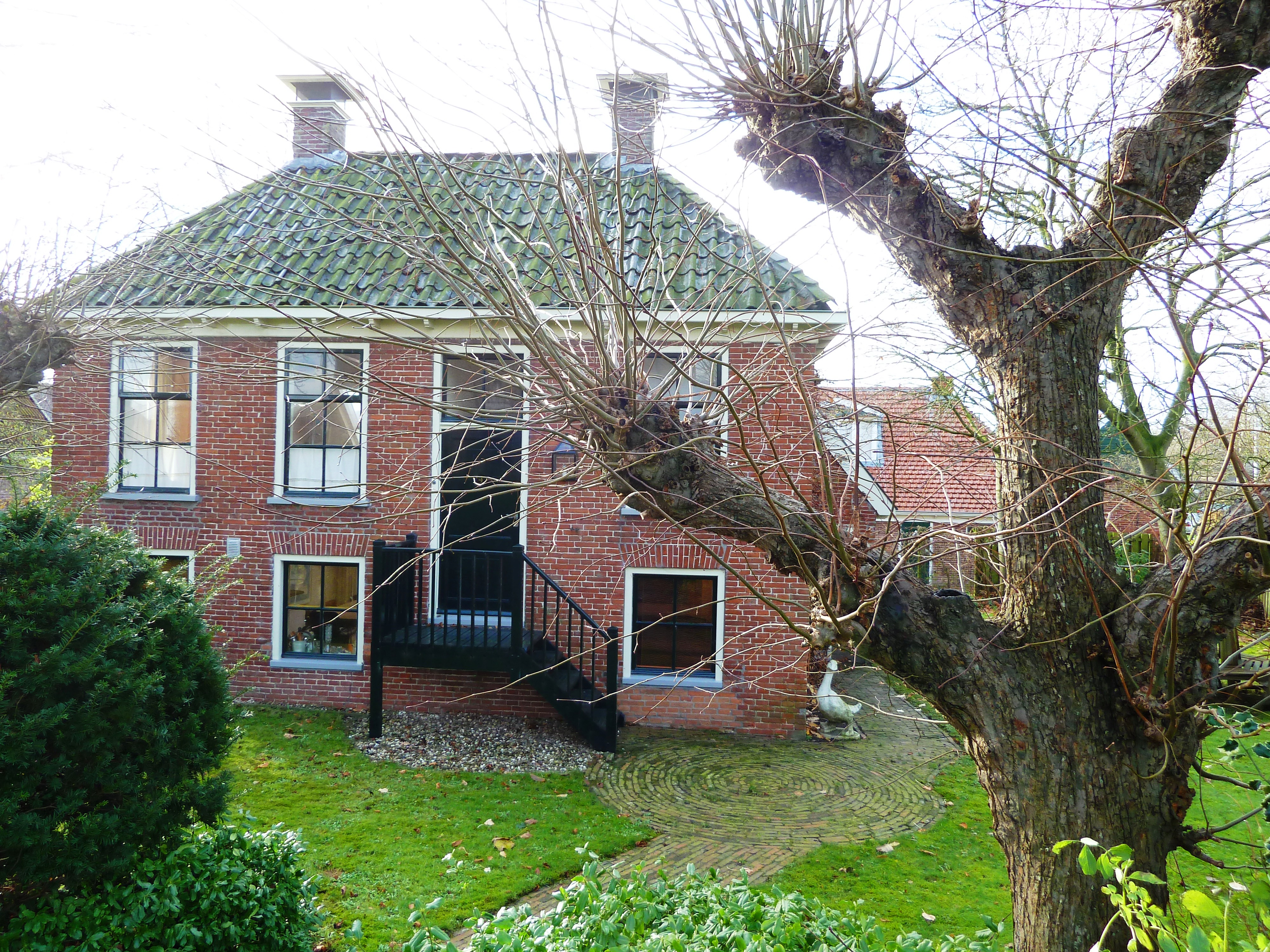
Farm in Burum
