= Eibergen =

Coordinates: 52°06′N 6°39′E

- Town
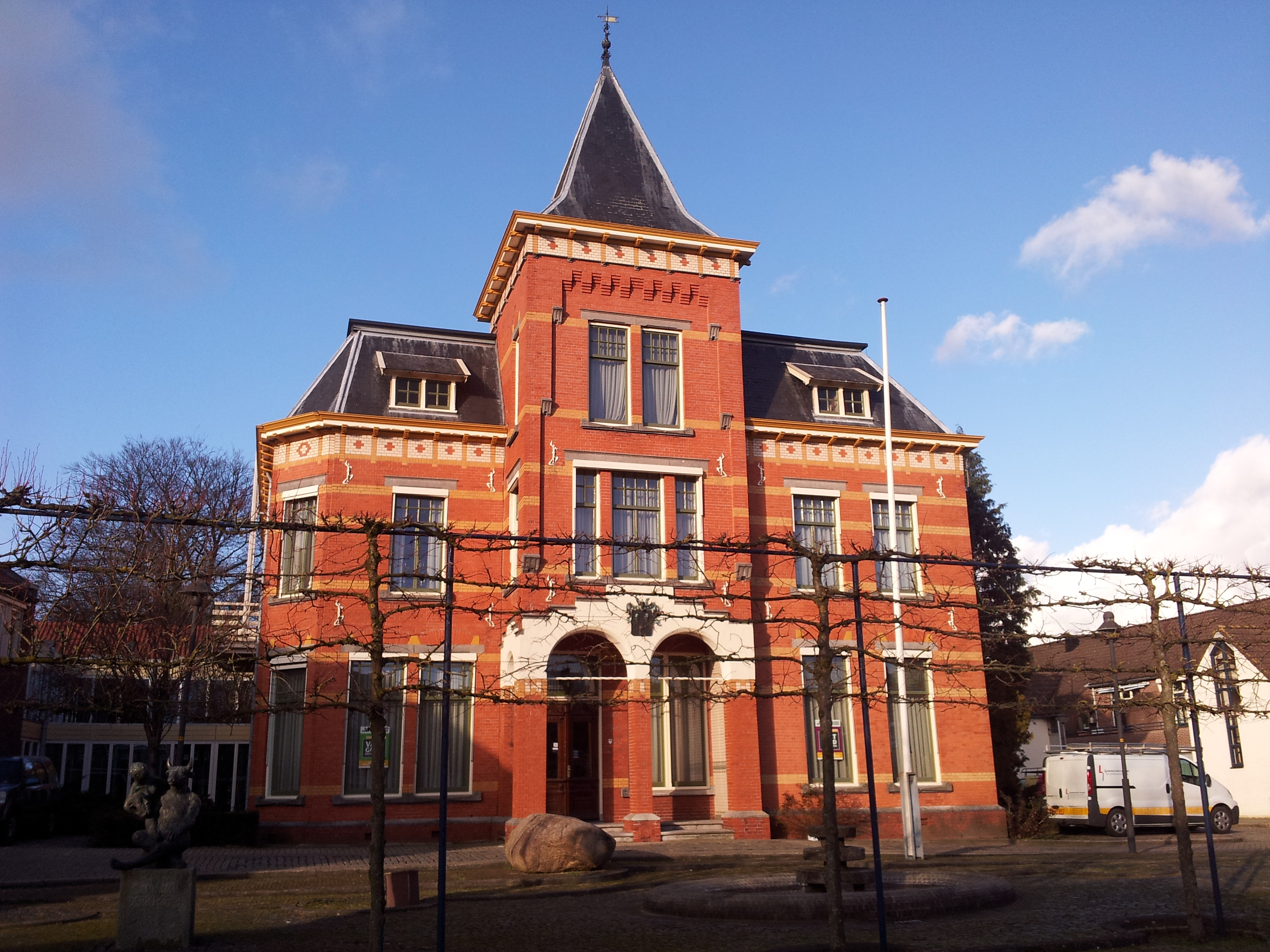
- Former Eibergen Town Hall

- Flag Coat of arms

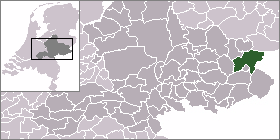
- Country: Netherlands
- Province: Gelderland
- Municipality: Berkelland

Area
  - Total: 117.56 km^{2} (45.39 sq mi)
  - Land: 116.79 km^{2} (45.09 sq mi)
  - Water: 0.77 km^{2} (0.30 sq mi)

Population
  - Total: 16,626
  - Density: 142/km^{2} (370/sq mi)

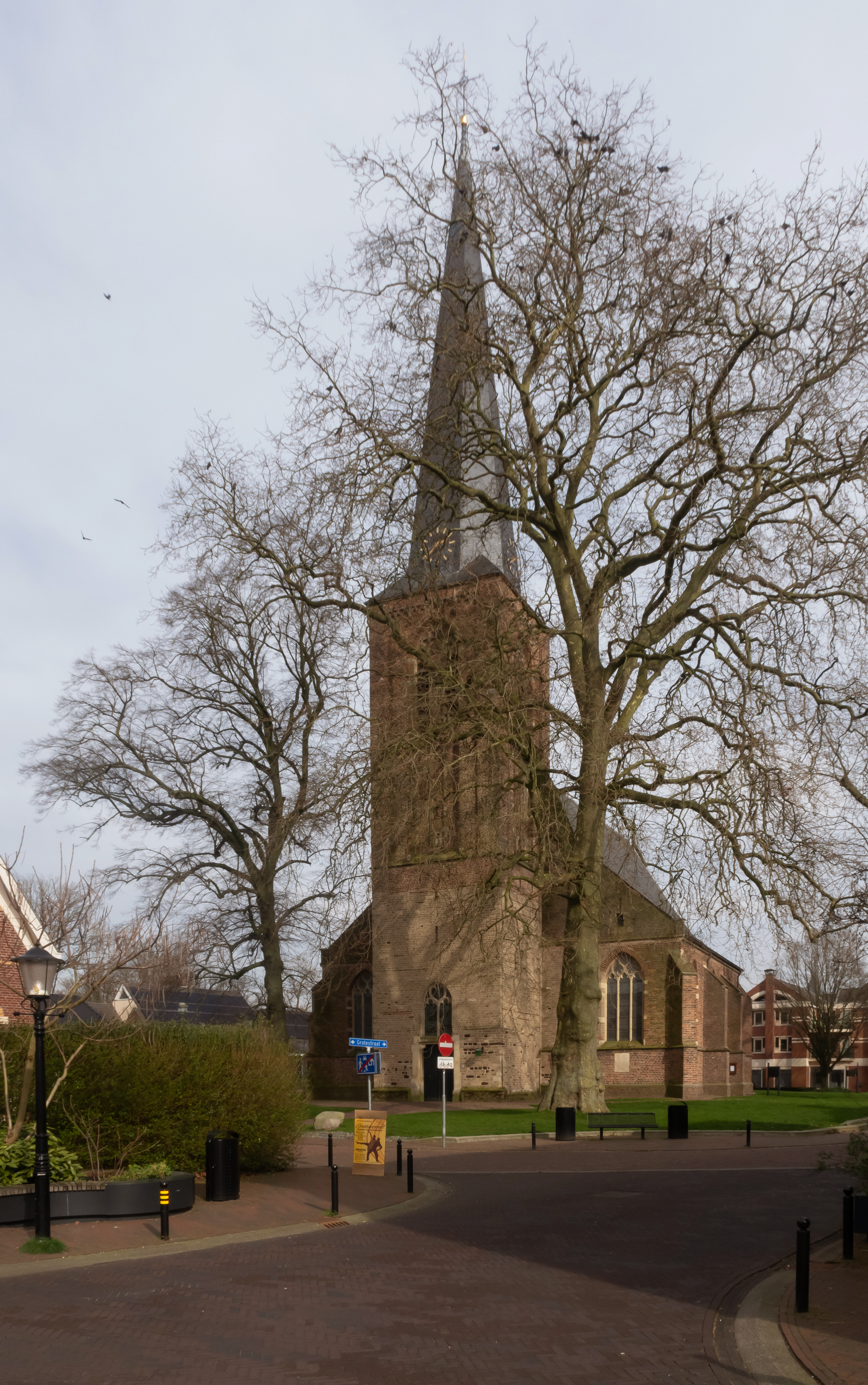
Church (the Oude Mattheüskerk in Eibergen

Eibergen (Low Saxon: Eibarge) is a town and former municipality in Gelderland in the Eastern Netherlands. It is part of the Achterhoek cultural region. The administrative cooperation of about 20 municipalities in this region is the Regio Achterhoek.

On 1 January 2005 the municipality of Eibergen merged with the neighbouring municipalities of Neede, Borculo and Ruurlo into the new municipality of Berkelland. As of 2021, the town had a population of 11,210.

== Population centres ==
- Avest
- Beltrum
- Eibergen
- Holterhoek
- Hupsel
- Lintvelde
- Loo
- Mallem
- Olden Eibergen
- Rekken
- Zwolle

== The town of Eibergen ==
The town of Eibergen has a population of approximately 12,000 people. Its East boundary is the Dutch-German border and Eibergen used to count two official border crossing points on main roads and a small number of border crossing points for limited use on secondary roads. Since border crossing traffic became free and checks are only made inward at a certain distance from the actual border, the border has been 'perforated' by numerous (mostly bicycle) roads.

Because of this border past, a local annual indoor soccer tournament of Eibergen's police has grown to the world's largest sports event of its kind: the World Police Indoor Soccer Tournament. Held in October every year: more than 3,000 police officers from over 54 countries participate.

== Government ==
It houses an interception station of the Nationale SIGINT Organisatie.

== Monuments ==
The Mallumsche Molen is an old water mill, built in 1753. It lies on the Mallumsche Molenweg, together with the Muldershuis and opens every Saturday to show how flour can be ground by the water mill.

In the centre of Eibergen is the De Scheper museum which displays objects from the history of Eibergen and the Achterhoek.

== People born in Eibergen ==
- Willem Sluyter (1627–1673), vicar and writer
- Hendrik Odink (1889–1973), writer and local historian
- Menno ter Braak (1902–1940), author and polemicist
- Annie Borckink (born 1951), speed skater
- Astrid Bussink (born 1975), filmmaker
- Judith Pietersen (born 1989), volleyball player
