= Angel Makers of Nagyrév =

Female group of murderers in 20th-century Hungary

- Hungarian: Tiszazugi méregkeverők
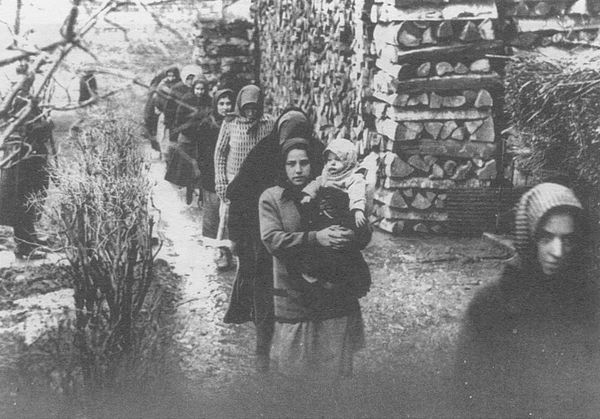
- Defendants in the arsenic poisoning case walking in the Szolnok prison yard
- Years active: 1914–1929
- Criminal charge: Murder
- Penalty: 6 death sentences, 3 of which were carried out; 8 others sentenced to life in prison

Details
- Location: Location of Nagyrév in Hungary
- Target: abusive or unwanted relatives
- Killed: 45–300 men
- Weapon: Arsenic
- Date apprehended: 1929

The Angel Makers of Nagyrév (Hungarian: Tiszazugi méregkeverők, "Tiszazug poison-mixers") were a group of 26 women and two men from villages in the Tiszántúl region of Hungary, who were suspected of poisoning a confirmed 45–50 people and a speculated but not confirmed 300 more between 1911 and 1929. (Note: The exact number is disputed; the historian Béla Bodó, for example, estimates the number of victims at only around 45–50.)

Eight of the suspects were sentenced to life in prison, two were given shorter sentences, and six were sentenced to death (three were actually executed). They were supplied arsenic and encouraged to use it by a local midwife named Zsuzsanna Fazekas, née Oláh (Hungarian: Fazekas Gyuláné Oláh Zsuzsanna), wife of Gyula Fazekas. Their story is the subject of the documentary film The Angelmakers and the feature film Hukkle.

While most of the poisoning cases were reported in the village of Nagyrév (hence the collective name for the women involved), several similar poisonings occurred in Tiszakürt, Ókécske, Tiszaföldvár, Kunszentmárton, Mesterszállás, and Öcsöd, and there were cases in Békés, Csongrád, and Zala counties.

== Crimes ==
Zsuzsanna Fazekas was a middle-aged midwife who arrived in Nagyrév in 1911, with her husband already missing without explanation. Between 1911 and 1921, she was imprisoned ten times for performing illegal abortions but was consistently acquitted by judges.

In Hungarian society at that time, the future husband of a teenage bride was selected by her family, and she was forced to accept her parents' choice. Divorce was rarely granted if the husband was an alcoholic or violent. The law already allowed divorce in cases of severe abuse, but the burden of proof always fell on the victim of the abusive relationship. During World War I, when able-bodied men were sent to fight for Austria-Hungary, rural Nagyrév was an ideal location for holding Allied prisoners of war. With POWs having limited freedom within the village, the women living there often had one or more foreign lovers while their husbands were away. When the men returned, despite their wives' affairs, many decided to resume their previous way of life, creating a volatile situation. At this time, Fazekas began secretly persuading women who wished to escape this situation to poison their husbands using arsenic made by boiling flypaper and skimming off the lethal residue.

After murdering their husbands, some of the women went on to poison their parents, who had become a burden to them, or to get hold of their inheritance. Others poisoned their lovers, some even their sons. The midwife allegedly asked the poisoners, "Why put up with them?"

The first poisoning in Nagyrév took place in 1911; it was not the work of Fazekas. The deaths of other husbands, children, and family members soon followed. The poisonings became a fad, and by the mid-1920s, Nagyrév earned the nickname "the murder district". There were an estimated 45–50 murders over the 18 years that Fazekas lived in the district. She was the closest thing to a doctor the village had, and her cousin was the clerk who filed all the death certificates, allowing the murders to go undetected.

== Capture ==
Three conflicting accounts have been cited to explain how the Angel Makers were eventually detected. In one, Szabó, one of the Angel Makers, was caught in the act by two visitors who survived her poisoning attempts. She pointed a finger at a woman with the surname Bukenoveski, who in turn named Fazekas. In another account, a medical student in a neighbouring town found high arsenic levels in a body that washed up on the riverbank, leading to an investigation. However, according to Béla Bodó, a Hungarian-American historian and author of the first scholarly book on the subject, the murders were finally made public in 1929 when an anonymous letter to the editor of a small local newspaper accused women from the Tiszazug region of the country of poisoning family members.

Authorities exhumed dozens of corpses from the local cemetery. 28 suspects were brought to trial (all but two were women), and they were convicted of 162 murders. While the case was investigated in detail, with 12 trials held between 1929 and 1931, no precise figures for the number of victims are available, as other sources estimated them at around 300. The authorities tried the cases separately in order to avoid publicity. The trials eventually ended with six death sentences (three were hanged, and the sentences of the other three were commuted: one was acquitted and two received life imprisonment), eight cases of life imprisonment, and two shorter prison sentences.
