= Astrid Bussink =

Dutch filmmaker

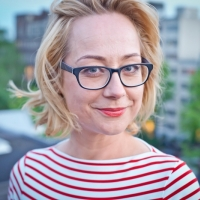
Astrid Bussink

Astrid Bussink (born 1975 in Eibergen, Gelderland) is a Dutch filmmaker. Her debut film is the documentary The Angelmakers.

== Biography ==
She studied fine art at the Academy of fine Arts, AKI, Enschede (BA) in the Netherlands and her Master in film at the Edinburgh College of Art in Scotland. During this Master she shot her award-winning documentary The Angelmakers (First Appearance Award IDFA, Little Stamp award, Best Young Director at ZagrebDox, Best short Documentary, Dokufest, nomination Grierson Award and more). After this she made the short films Rückenlage / Upside Down (Best Short Experimental film at Vermont International Film Festival, nominated Silver Cub, IDFA 2006), The 9 lives of my car (a.o. Dutch Filmfestival 2007) and I shot the mayor (Or: Plan B) (a.o. nominated Silver Cub IDFA 2007, official selection ZagrebDox and HOTDOCS).

Bussink lives and works in Amsterdam where she made her feature-length documentary The Lost Colony (Official Selection International Film Festival Rotterdam, HOTDOCS a.o.), screened in 2008. She made a personal documentary, Mijn Enschede, about the Enschede fireworks disaster that happened 13 May 2000, in which 23 people died, nearly 1000 were injured and many houses were destroyed, including Bussink's house. 'My Enschede' premiered at the International Film Festival Rotterdam in January 2010.

During her artist in residency program in New York she started her photography project Constructions of Happiness, which she showed in galleries in New York, Edinburgh and Amsterdam.

In September 2012 her documentary Poem of Death premiered at the Netherlands Film Festival.

== Awards ==
- At the 2008 ZagrebDox, she won Best Young Director for The Angelmakers.
- At the 2012 Edinburgh International Film Festival, she was nominated for Best International Short Film for Mr and Mrs Gunya.
- At the 2013 Nyon Visions du Réel, she won Special Mention for Medium-Length Film for Poule des doods.
- At the 2017 International Documentary Film Festival Amsterdam, IDFA, she won the Special Juryprize for her documentary LISTEN about 'De Kindertelefoon'.
