= Helhoek =

Helhoek may refer to:

- Helhoek, South Holland
- Helhoek, Gelderland
