= IJsseloog =

Artificial island in Dronten

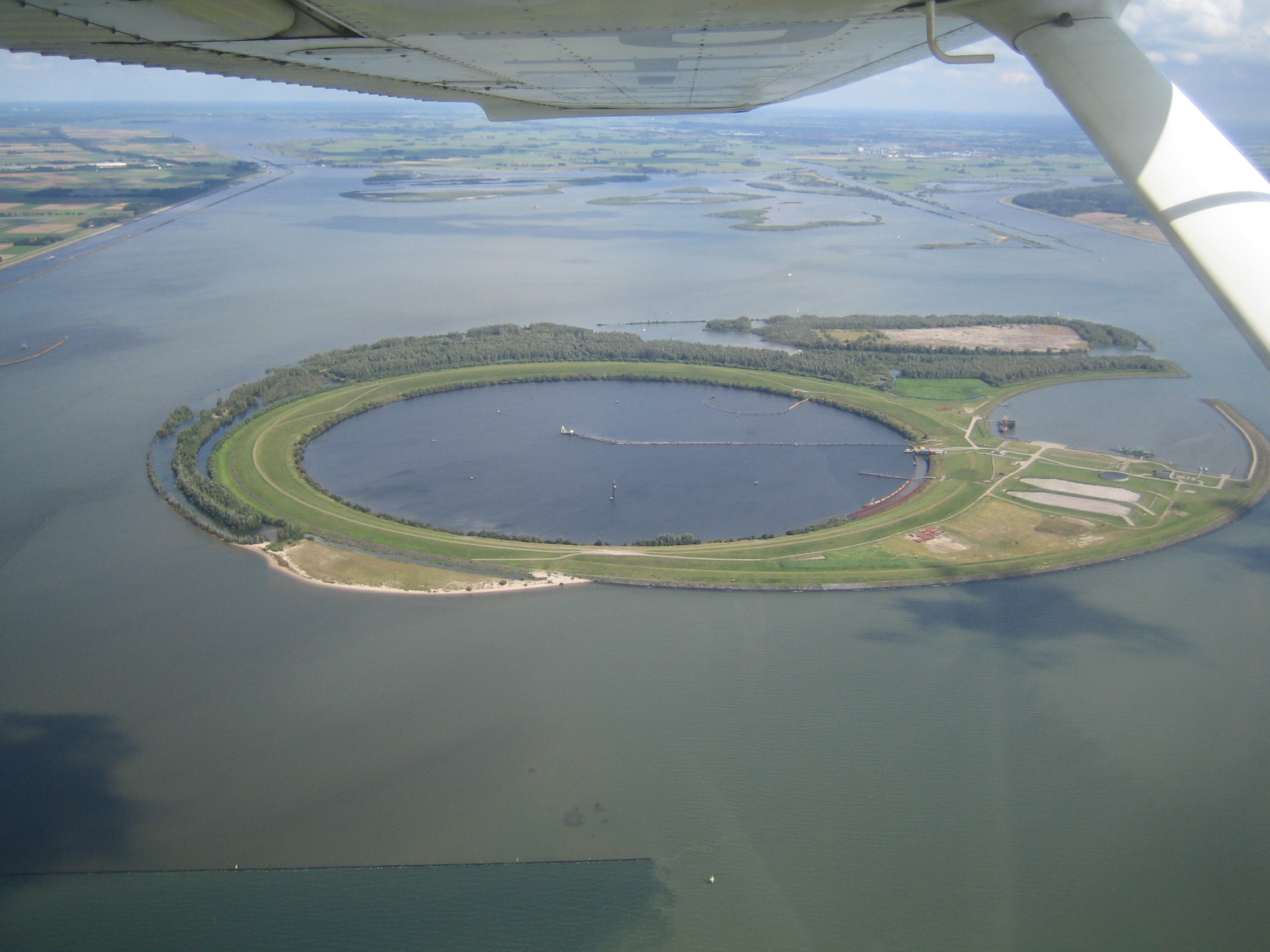
- Aerial photo of IJsseloog in 2009

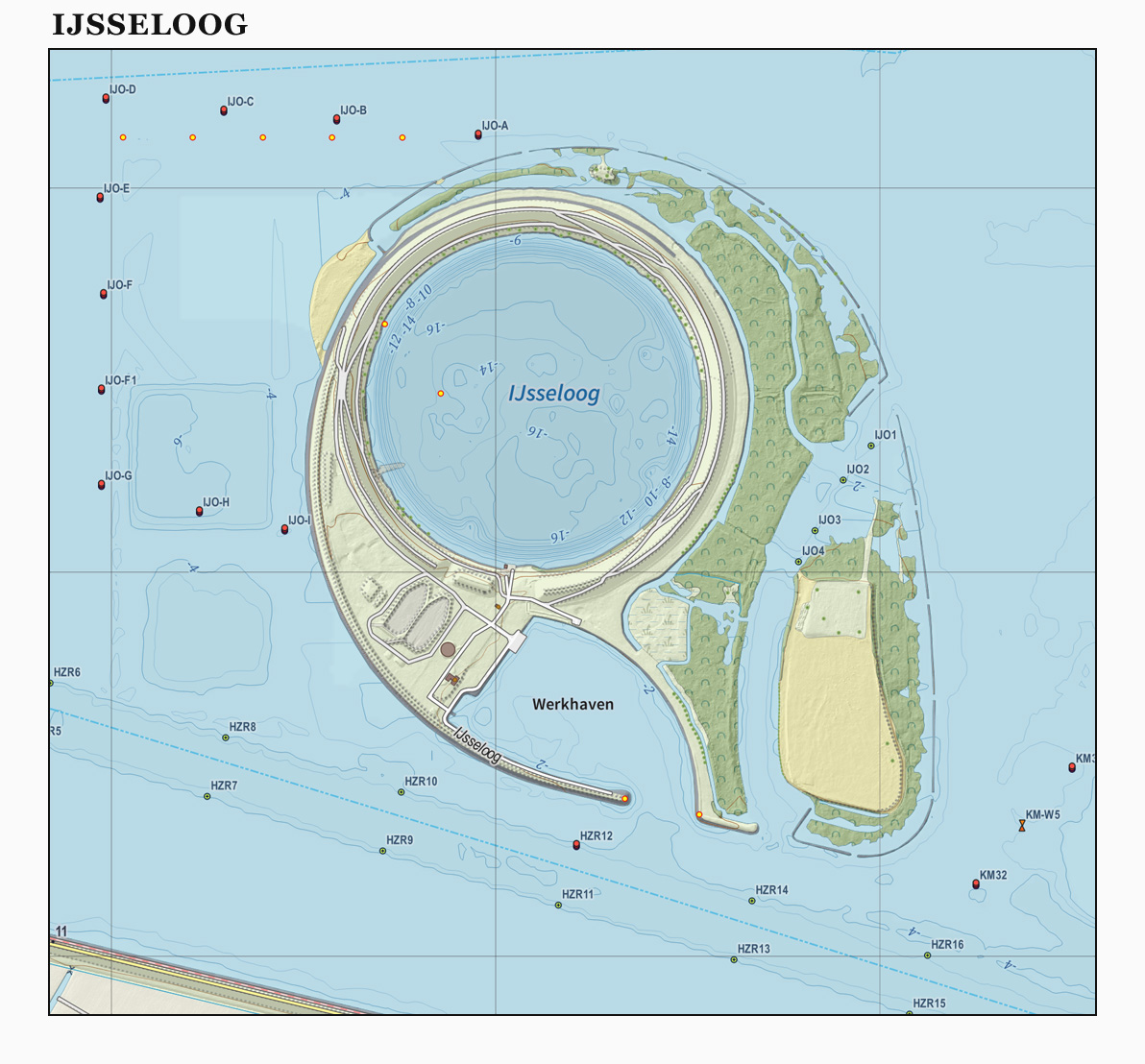
- Map of IJsseloog
- Etymology: IJssel island

Geography
- Location: Ketelmeer
- Coordinates: 52°36′N 5°45′E

Administration
- Netherlands
- Province: Flevoland
- Municipality: Dronten

Demographics
- Population: Uninhabited

The IJsseloog (Dutch pronunciation: [ˈɛisəlˌoːx], "IJssel eye" or "IJssel island") is an artificial island in the Ketelmeer (province of Flevoland, the Netherlands) used as a depository to store polluted silt. Most of the polluted silt was deposited in the Ketelmeer by the IJssel river between 1950 and 1990. Removal of silt soil from the Ketelmeer lake also aims to deepen the channel leading to the mouth of the IJssel to at least a depth of 3.5 m (11.5 ft), thus aiming to improve access to the river for navigation.

Construction of IJsseloog started in 1996 and was completed in 1999. During construction of the IJsseloog, a major concern was to preserve the water table and the environment of Ketelmeer. The polluted silt is to be stored permanently and without any risk of leakage. To avoid nuisance to agriculture, to local residents, and to prevent groundwater contamination, the silt depository was built in the centre of the lake and not on the coast. IJsseloog is also a target for recreational and ecological development. Two other artificial islands were created: Hanzeplaat and Schokkerbank.

The dredgings are being stored in a man-made island depot in the middle of the Ketelmeer. One kilometer across and fifty meters deep, the depot is designed to hold 23 million cubic meters of sludge, of which 15 million cubic metres from the Ketelmeer, and the rest from elsewhere. To prevent leakage, the floor of the depot is sealed with clay and the dike is lined with foil. The water level is held below that of the lake, to prevent pollution runoff.

A port was built on the outer edge of the IJsseloog for delivery of silt. Once the depot is full, remediation will be done by decantation. Clean silt will be used to construct a new ecological zone, the IJsselmonding. The clean sludge that is released will be used for the construction of a natural IJssel estuary.

A treatment plant began operating in 2000. Its processing station separates sand and peat from contaminants. Purified sand will be used for construction, and the remaining sludge is pumped to storage. When storage is full, the layers of clay and sand will be sealed, and the island itself will be used for recreational purposes. After that process, nature will take over in the IJsseloog.
