= Apo.com Group =

German health-tech-company

apo.com Group
- Type: GmbH
- Industry: E-Commerce
- Founded: 2004
- Founder: Kirsten Fritsch
- Headquarters: Markkleeberg, Germany
- Key people: Dr. Oliver Scheel (CEO); Daniel Mühl (COO)
- Revenue: 375 million Euro (2025)
- Number of employees: 450 (2025)
- Parent: apo.com Group Holding GmbH
- Website: group-apo.com

The apo.com Group GmbH (formerly Apologistics GmbH) is a Europe-wide operating health company with its headquarters in Markkleeberg near Leipzig, Germany. Further locations are Duiven (Netherlands) and Wrocław (Poland). The apo.com Group operates several domains for the shipping of pharmacy-appropriate products as well as over-the-counter and prescription medications. The best-known sites are the online pharmacy apodiscounter.de and the health platform apo.com. With its two highly automated logistics centres in Duiven and Markkleeberg, up to 54,000 parcels a day can be shipped. Thus the apo.com Group runs the third largest pharmaceutical mail order business on the German market.

== History ==
In the early 1990s pharmacist Kirsten Fritsch founded a pharmacy in the Paunsdorf Center in Leipzig. This was opened in 1995 as a pharmacy in Kaufland and belonged to one of the first Kaufland pharmacies, an initiative by the Schwarz-Group in the pharmacy market.

In 2004 the Fritsch family registered the online pharmacy Apo-Discounter.de. Shipping was done from the back-office of the pharmacy in the Paunsdorf Center. In 2005 industrial engineer Dirk Wappler came on board as co-founder. With 1,000 packages a day the capacity limit was reached and Apo-Discounter.de moved to Markkleeberg near Leipzig.

In 2007 pharmacist Michael Fritsch and Dirk Wappler founded Apologistics GmbH. In the same year GE Capital via its leasing division invested 6 million Euro, enabling the realisation of a new 2,800 m^{2} logistics centre in Markkleeberg. Following this, cooperations with Amazon, eBay and later also an official Lidl partnership followed. In 2010 the online pharmacy group reached over 1 million customers for the first time.

In 2013 banker and major shareholder Gerhard Köhler invested 2 million Euro in Apologistics. In 2018 the Hagenmeyer family, formerly owners of the gearbox manufacturer Getrag, invested via the holding company THI Investments 60 million Euro. This made possible the construction of a new logistics facility in Duiven, Netherlands. THI Investments later increased its participation and now holds the majority share. The new logistics centre in Duiven was opened in 2020 and covers about 20,000 m^{2}. It is characterised by even stronger automation with a robot-controlled picking system. The pharmacy mail order business was transferred to the affiliated pharmacy Apo Pharmacy B.V., which operates the online pharmacies to this day.

These include the subsidiaries Deutsche Internet Apotheke, Juvalis and Apolux.

In 2021, the company name changed from Apologistics to apo.com Group, and Dr. Oliver Scheel became CEO. This is associated with reorientation to a health-tech company with focus on innovative digital services. These include, among others, AI-supported advisory tools, cooperation with telemedicine platforms and expansion in the field of pharmaceutical services.

Since March 2024 the apo.com Group has been a member of the European Association of E-Pharmacies (EAEP). Before that the apo.com Group was also a member of the Federal Association of German Mail-Order Pharmacies (BVDVA).
