= Westervoort =

- Municipality
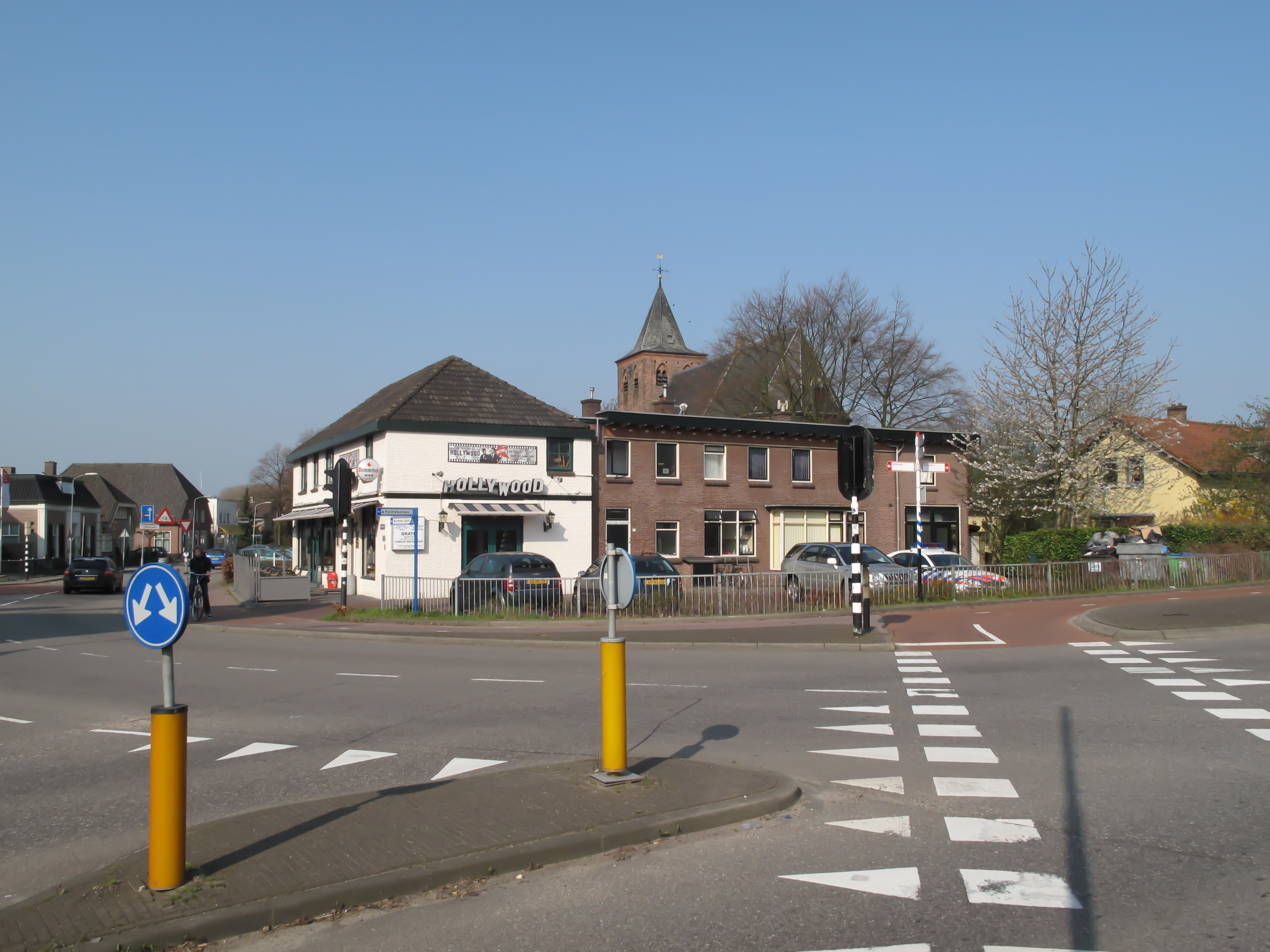
- Street through Westervoort

- Flag Coat of arms

- Location in Gelderland

- Location within Gelderland Location within Netherlands
- Coordinates: 51°58′N 5°58′E
- Country: Netherlands
- Province: Gelderland

Government
  - Body: Municipal council
  - Mayor: Arend van Hout (VVD)

Area
  - Total: 7.84 km^{2} (3.03 sq mi)
  - Land: 7.03 km^{2} (2.71 sq mi)
  - Water: 0.81 km^{2} (0.31 sq mi)
- Elevation: 11 m (36 ft)

Population (January 2021)
  - Total: 15,014
  - Density: 2,136/km^{2} (5,530/sq mi)
- Time zone: UTC+1 (CET)
  - Summer (DST): UTC+2 (CEST)
- Postcode: 6930–6932
- Area code: 026
- Website: www.westervoort.nl

Westervoort (Dutch pronunciation: [ˌʋɛstərˈvoːrt]) is a municipality and a town in the eastern Netherlands. The town has two rivers inside its borders, the Rhine and the IJssel. It is a commuter town closely linked to Arnhem, the capital of Gelderland, which is situated on the west bank of the IJssel river, the east bank being occupied by Westervoort. It is the smallest Dutch municipality by area.

== Transport ==
On 11 December 2011, a new railway station was opened in Westervoort. This meant that for the first time in 75 years the inhabitants of Westervoort could make use of railway transportation again. Next to the recently opened station, public buses run through Westervoort. These buses establish a direct connection to Arnhem and the surrounding towns of Duiven and Zevenaar. The A12 motorway runs north of Westervoort and has an exit serving both Westervoort and the western parts of Duiven. In the south of Westervoort a small ferry boat connects Westervoort to the town of Huissen by crossing the Rhine.

== Notable residents ==
- Johan Andreas Dèr Mouw (1863–1919) poet and philosopher
- Theo Snelders (born 1963) football goalkeeper with 464 club caps
- Sophie Souwer (born 1987) a Dutch rower, competed at the 2016 Summer Olympics
- Jermaine Wattimena (born 1988) darts player

== Gallery ==
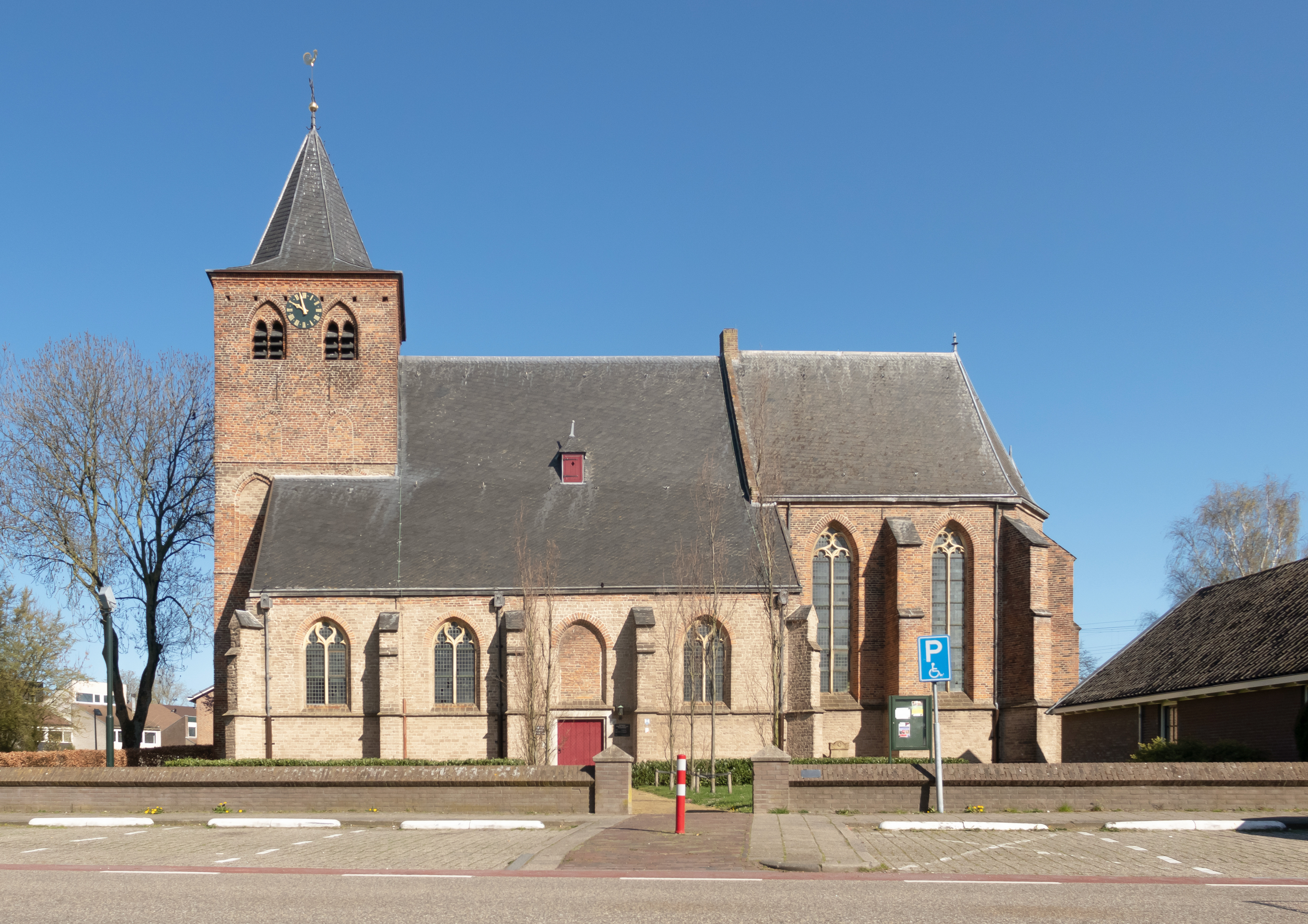
Westervoort, church: the Sint-Werenfriedkerk

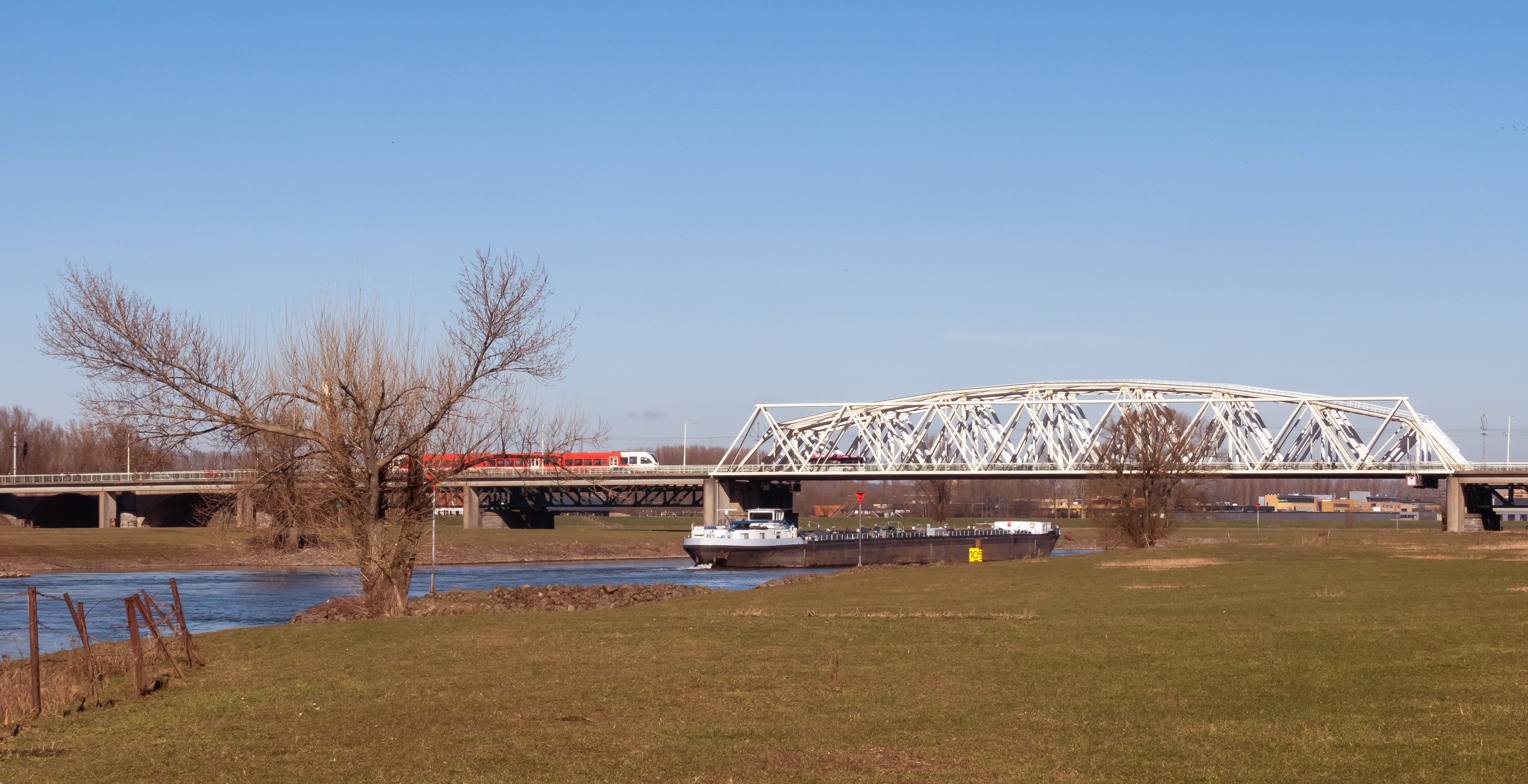
Bridge: Westervoortse Brug
