= Ketelbrug =

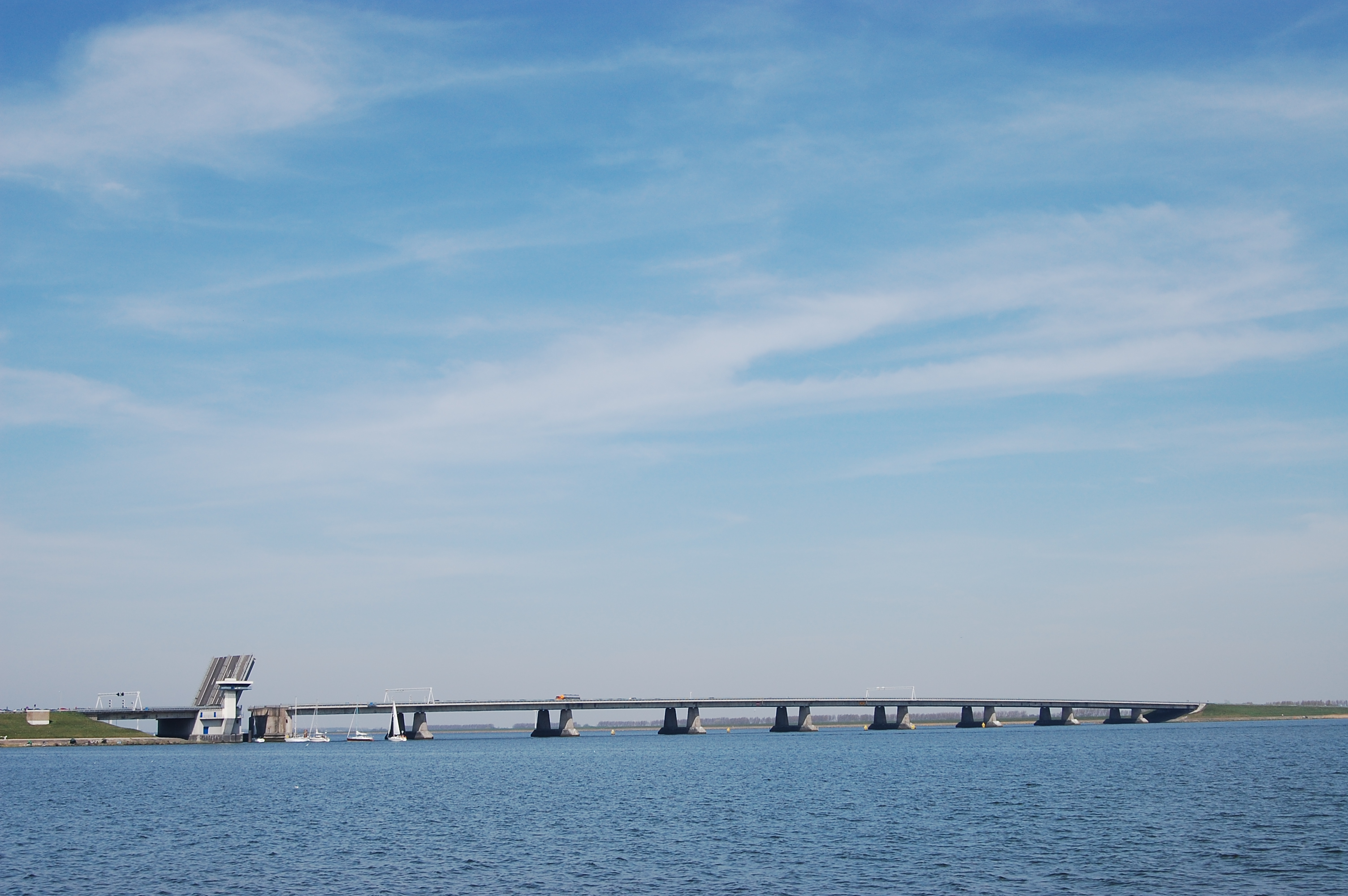
- The Ketelbrug in 2007, with its bascule section open
- Coordinates: 52°36′43″N 5°38′41″E
- Crosses: Ketelmeer
- Owner: Rijkswaterstaat

History
- Opened: July 15, 1970

Location
- Interactive map of Ketelbrug

The Ketelbrug is a bridge spanning the Ketelmeer (Ketel lake) between the Noordoostpolder and the eastern Flevopolder in the Dutch province of Flevoland. The A6 motorway runs over it.
A part of it is a bascule bridge.

The 800-meter-long (2,600 ft) bridge was opened on 15 July 1970.

The Ketelbrug has had accidents. One of those was on 4 October 2009, when it opened unexpectedly without the warning lights flashing. Ketelbrug had its warning lights replaced afterwards.

From Ketelbrug you will be able to see Zwolse-Hoek (Urk), and Kamperhoek.
