= Schipbeek =

Watercourse in the Netherlands

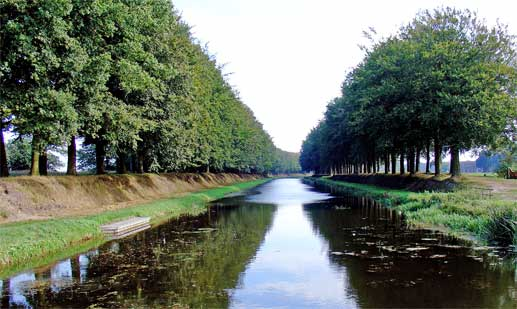
- South of Holten

Location
- Country: Netherlands

Physical characteristics
- Source
  - location: near Ahaus, Westphalia
  - coordinates: 52°00′59″N 7°01′45″E
- Mouth: IJssel
  - location: Deventer
  - coordinates: 52.2325°N 6.1647°E
- Length: 85.2 km (52.9 mi)
- Basin size: 423 km^{2} (163 sq mi)

Basin features
- Progression: IJssel→ IJsselmeer

The Schipbeek is a tributary of the IJssel in the Netherlands and a continuation of the Buurserbeek. It flows into the IJssel near Deventer.

The real source of the Schipbeek is in Germany - in western Northrhine-Westphalia - in the Ahauser Aa, to which the Alstätter Aa, the Buurserbeek and finally the Schipbeek are connected.
