= Helhoek, Gelderland =

Helhoek
- Hamlet
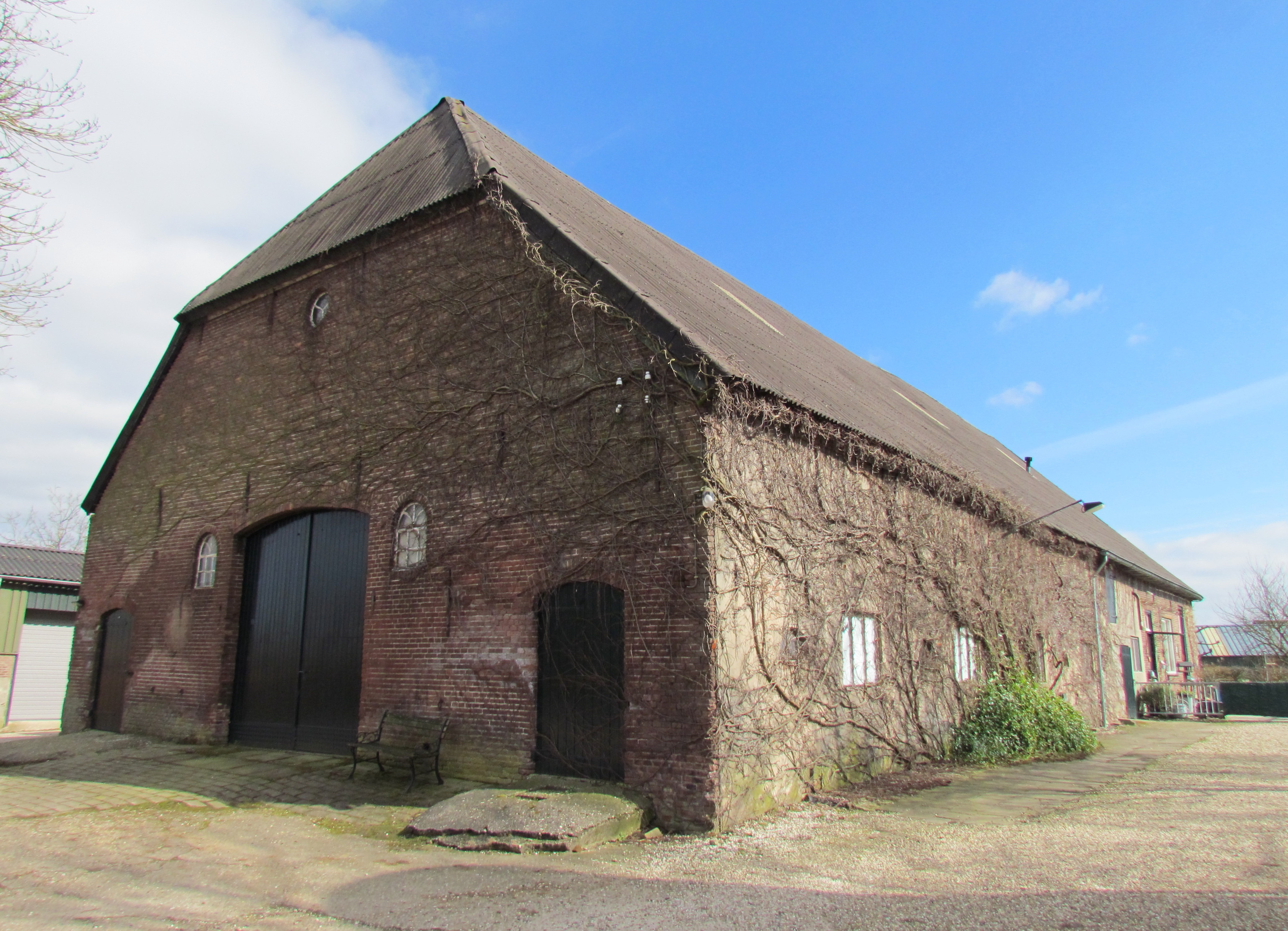
- Farm in Helhoek

- Location in the Netherlands Helhoek (Netherlands)
- Coordinates: 51°56′6″N 6°2′30″E
- Country: Netherlands
- Province: Gelderland
- Municipality: Duiven
- Elevation: 11 m (36 ft)
- Time zone: UTC+1 (CET)
  - Summer (DST): UTC+2 (CEST)
- Postal code: 6923
- Dialing code: 0316

Helhoek is a hamlet in the Dutch province of Gelderland. It is located in the municipality of Duiven, between the towns of Duiven and Zevenaar.

It was first mentioned between 1830 and 1855 as Helhoek. Hel can either mean inferno or steep hill. It is not a statistical entity, and the postal authorities have placed it under Groessen. There is an industrial zone near the hamlet. Helhoek consists of about 40 houses.
