= Johan Andreas Dèr Mouw =

Dutch poet and philosopher (1863–1919)

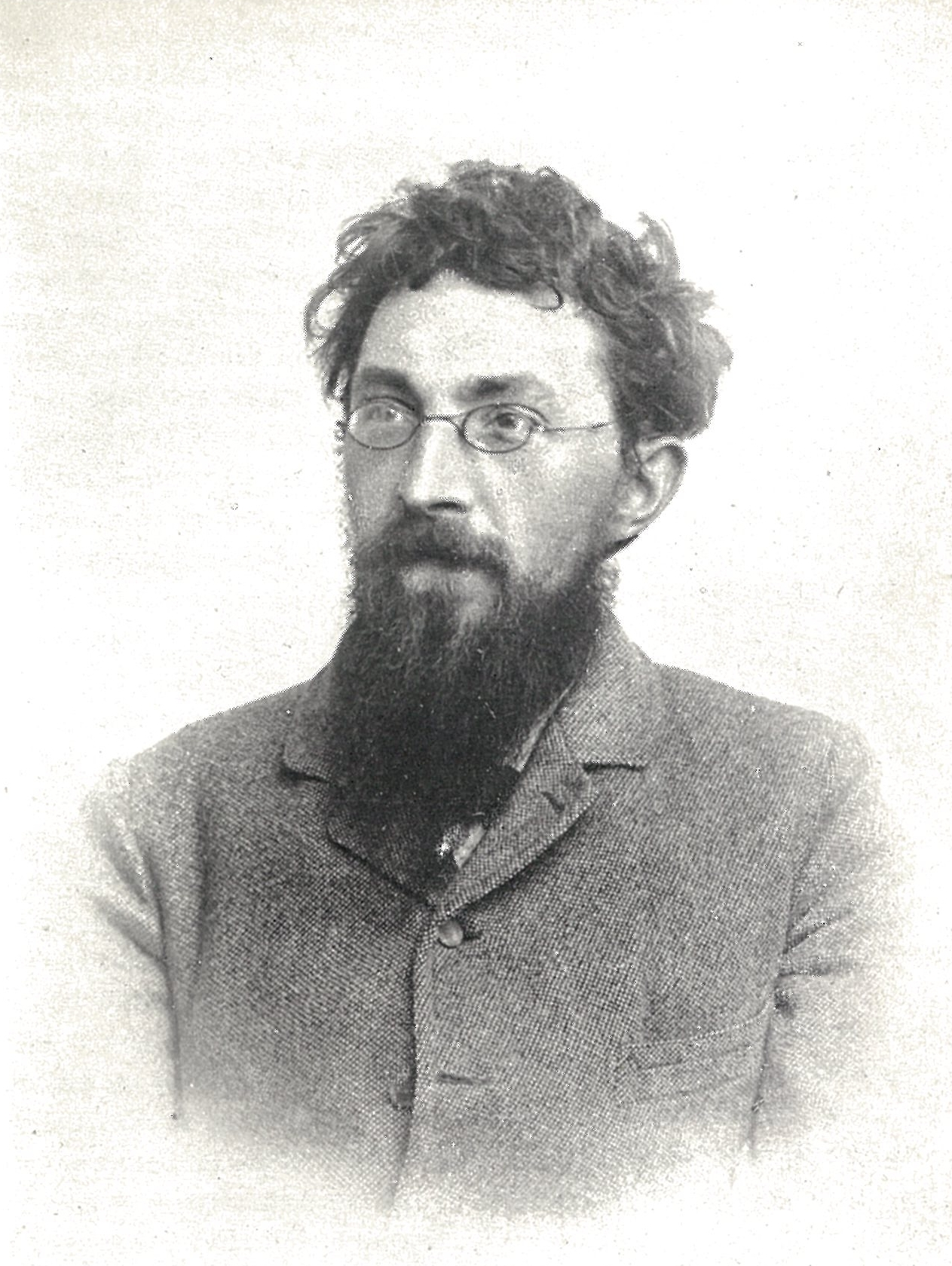
- Born: 24 July 1863; Westervoort, Netherlands
- Died: 8 July 1919 (aged 55); The Hague, Netherlands
- Education: Leiden University
- Occupations: teacher, poet
- Writing career
- Pen name: Adwaita
- Notable work: Brahman I
- Website: www.biografischportaal.nl/persoon/07166714

Johan Andreas Dèr Mouw (Dutch pronunciation: [ˈjoːɦɑn ɑnˈdreːjɑz dɛr ˈmʌu]; 24 July 1863 – 8 July 1919) was a Dutch poet and philosopher. During Dèr Mouw's life only some of his poems were published in literary journals. His penname "Adwaita" is Sanskrit for "he who is without two-ness".

== Life and career ==
Dèr Mouw was born in Westervoort. His father Jacob Cornelis der Mouw (orig. Dermauw) was for a short period insurance agent and bookseller; his mother Anna Elisabeth Zillinger was director of a school in Deventer. Dèr Mouw attended the Gymnasium (grammar school) in Deventer and studied at Leiden University from 1883 up to 1887, where he took up Greek, Latin, Sanskrit and philosophy. After graduating, Dèr Mouw got a job as teacher at the Gymnasium in Doetinchem. He defended his doctoral dissertation (Quomodo Antiqui Naturam mirati sunt?) at Leiden University in 1890. In 1893 Dèr Mouw married Hendrika van Enst. Their stepdaughter Teuntje Vink was later renamed Hetty der Mouw. Dèr Mouw's companionship with the son of the headmaster of the Gymnasium in Doetinchem led to a conflict. He was sued and convicted for insulting the headmaster. (His attorney was Pieter Jelles Troelstra). In the course of the scandal Dèr Mouw tried to commit suicide. Afterwards, Dèr Mouw moved to Rijswijk in 1904, and later to The Hague, where he supported his family by giving private tuition. He devoted the rest of his life to writing poetry and studying philosophy. He published two books on philosophy, with special attention to Hegel.

== Poetry ==
The poetry of Dèr Mouw is special, because he manages to express his mystical view on the world in clear words, that have a down-to-earth appeal. This can be seen in one of his most famous poems: I'm Brahman. But we are without a maid. Dèr Mouw published some of his poems in literary magazines, and was immediately recognised as an important poet by writers like Frederik van Eeden and Albert Verwey. Poets like P.C. Boutens and J.H. Leopold shared his interest for eastern mysticism. Dèr Mouw's didn't live to see his first book, Brahman I, come to light. It was published within a few weeks after his death, in July 1919.

Letters and manuscripts of J.A. Dèr Mouw are being kept in the Nederlands Letterkundig Museum in The Hague.

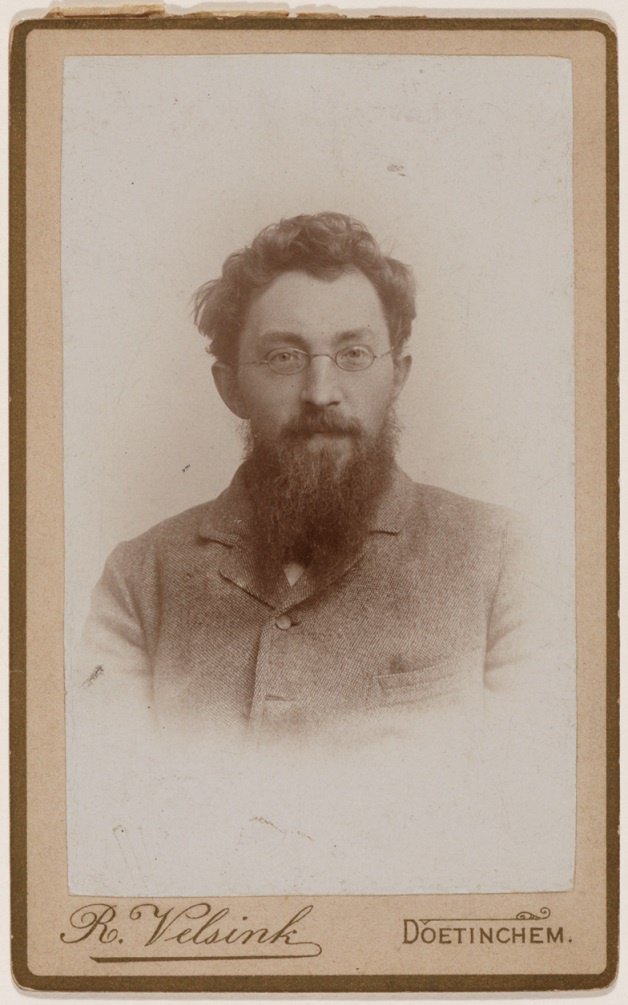
Johan Andreas Dèr Mouw

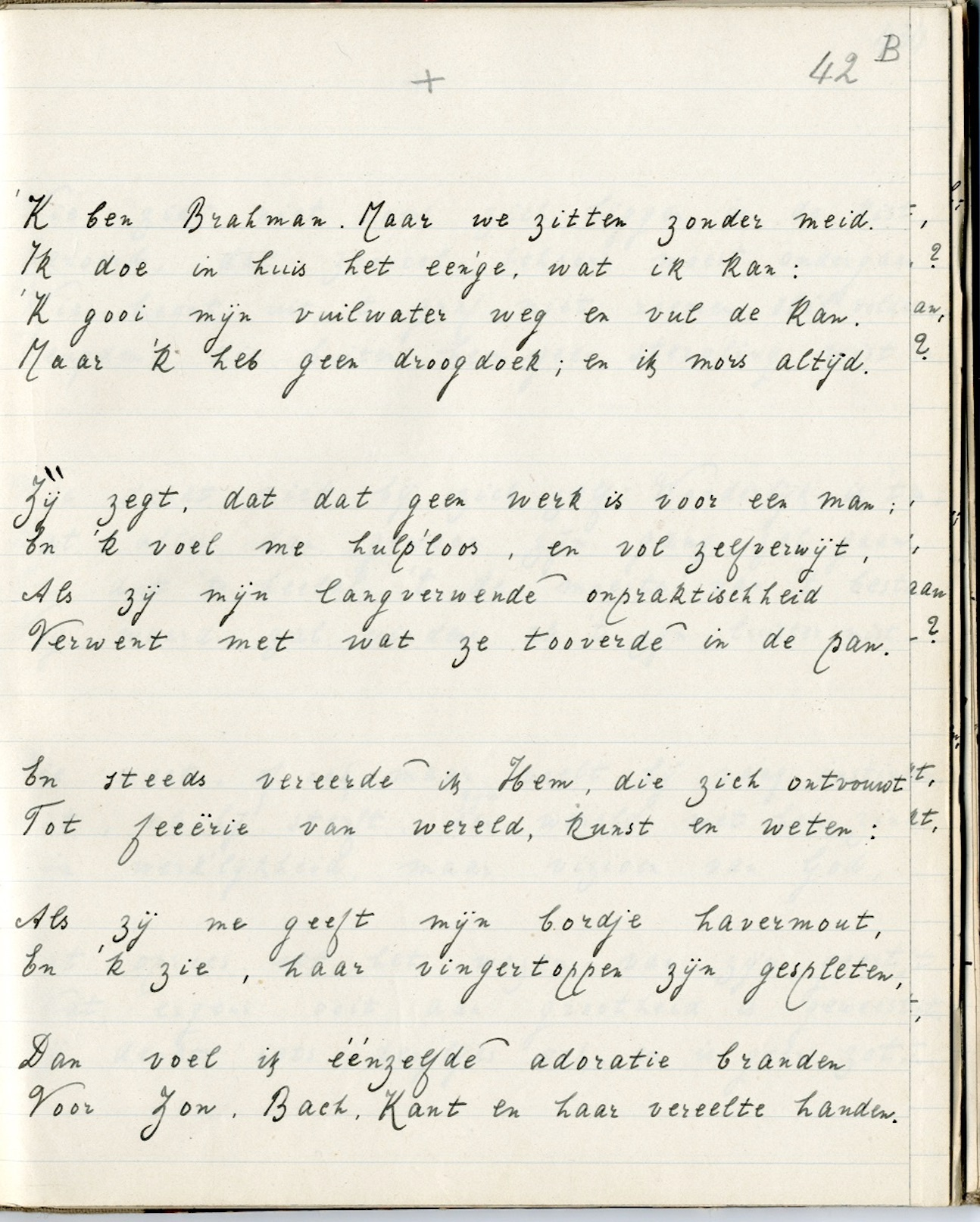
Manuscript

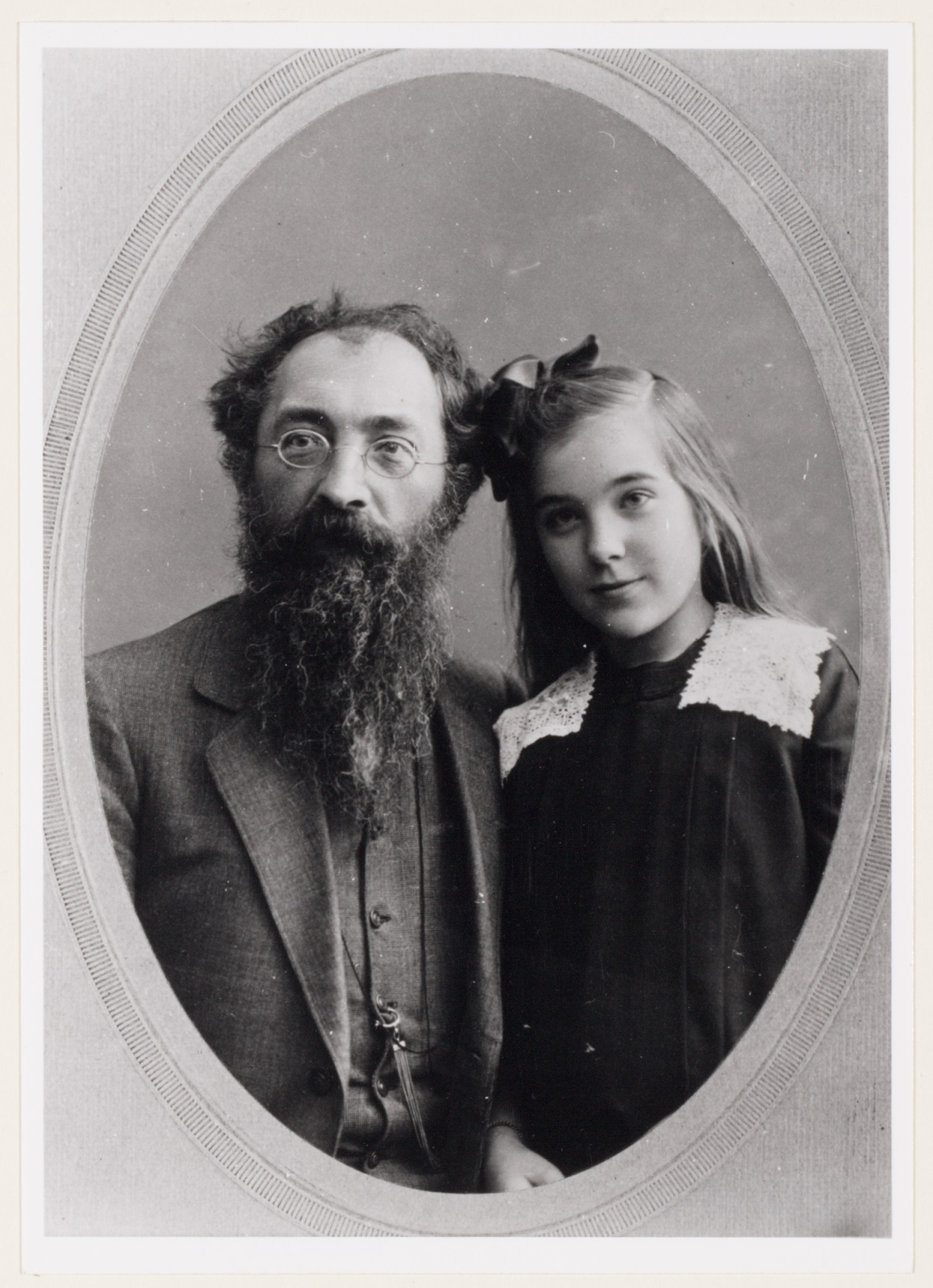
Dèr Mouw & his foster-daughter Hetty

== Publications (selection) ==
- (in Dutch) J.A. Dèr Mouw: Verzamelde Werken (vol. 1-6). (Ed. by Victor van Vriesland). Amsterdam, G.A. van Oorschot, 1947-1949
- (in Latin) J.A. Dèr Mouw: Quomodo Antiqui Naturam mirati sunt? Daventriae, Kreunen, 1890
- (in English) J.A. Dèr Mouw: I'm Brahman. 15 sonnets. (Transl.: Paul Claes). Sonnega, Regulieren Uitgeverij, 1999
- (in English) Two translations by Tanis Guest, in: 'I'll Call You God, You Powers’ Fifteen Poems Selected by Jozef Deleu' In: The Low Countries, vol. 10 (2002) & in: 'Solid and Volatile Twelve Poems Selected by Jozef Deleu' In: The Low Countries. vol. 11 (2003). (Resp.: I'm a Brahmin & Dull violet is the west (both transl. by Tanis Guest)
- (in English and Dutch) Johan Andreas dèr Mouw : Zes gedichten / Six poems. Transl. into English by John Irons. Bredevoort, Poëziecentrum Nederland & Dèr Mouwgenootschap, 2013. No ISBN
