= Ketelmeer =

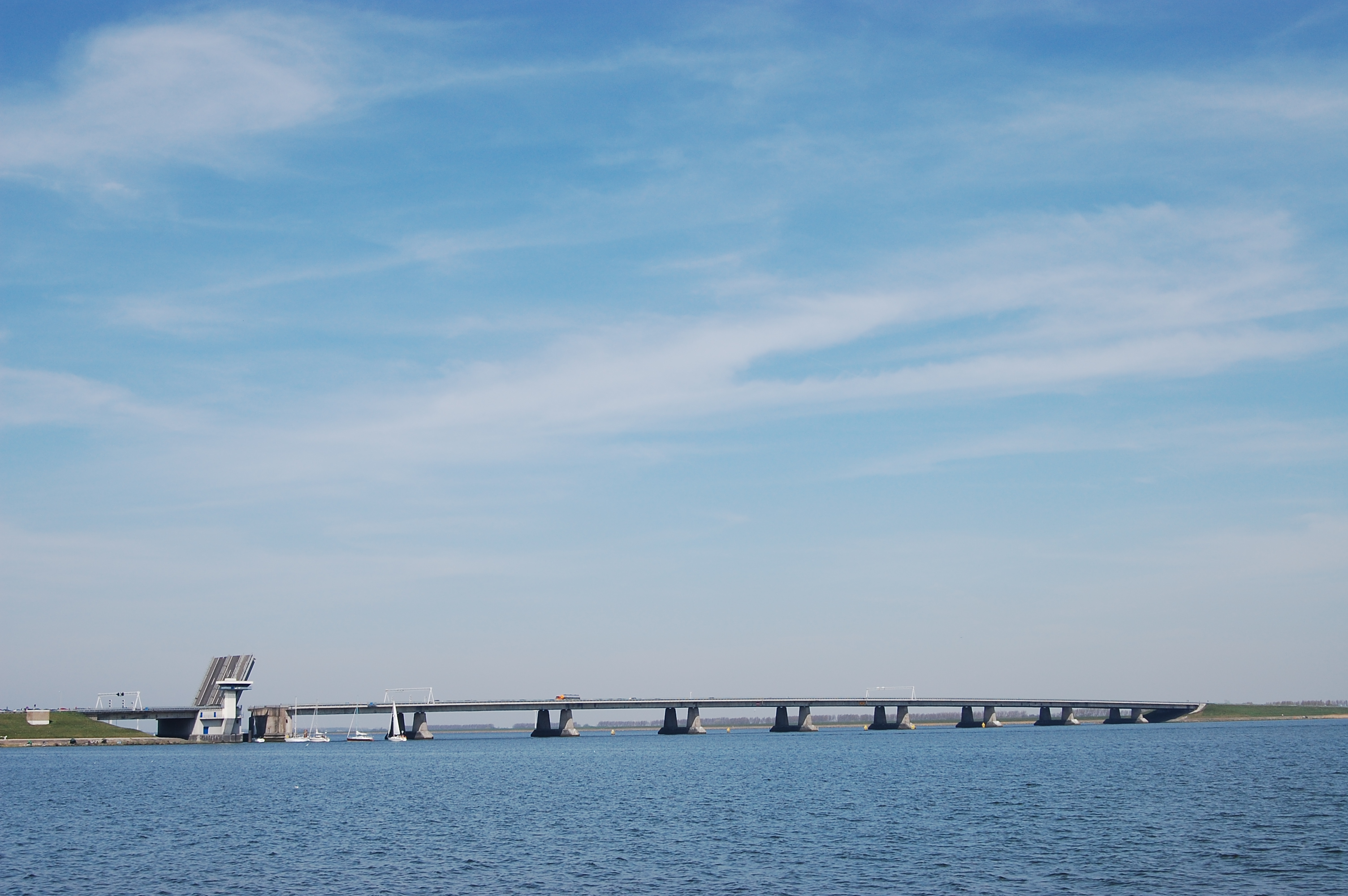
- The Ketelbrug over the Ketelmeer

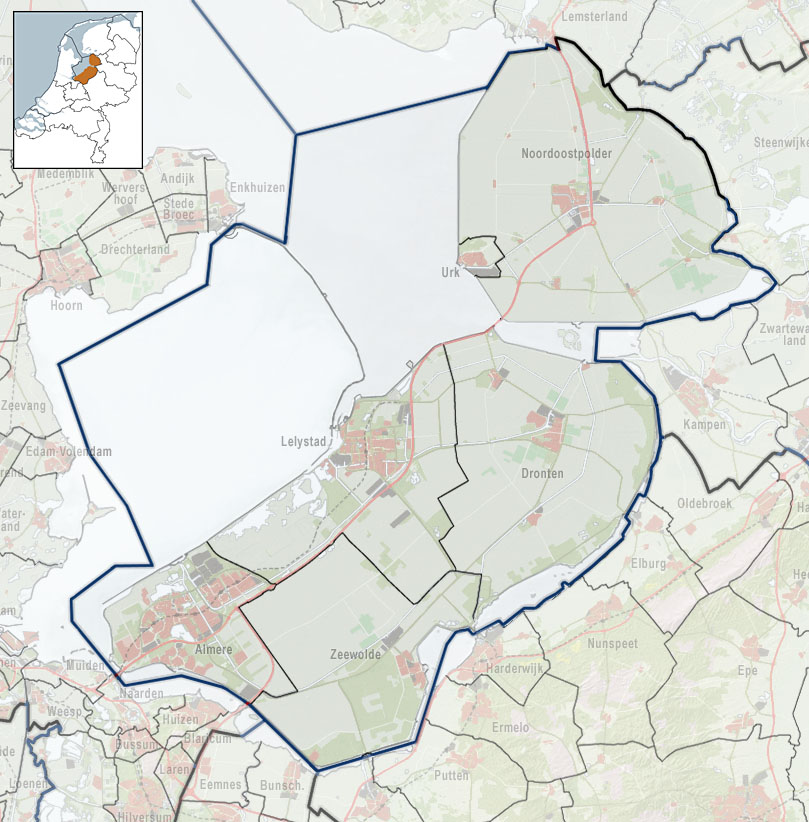
- Location in Flevoland Location in the Netherlands
- Location: Flevoland, Overijssel
- Coordinates: 52°36′24″N 5°44′11″E
- Type: bordering lake
- Basin countries: Netherlands
- Surface area: 3,500 ha (8,600 acres)
- Islands: IJsseloog

Ramsar Wetland
- Official name: Ketelmeer en Vossemeer
- Designated: 29 August 2000
- Reference no.: 1274

The Ketelmeer is the tongue of the IJsselmeer into which the IJssel river drains. It is situated between the polders Noordoostpolder (North-east Polder) and Oostelijk Flevoland (East Flevoland), and connects the river IJssel to the IJsselmeer lake. It is a continuous body of water which separate Flevoland from the Noordostpolder and the ancient lands of the provinces of Gelderland and Utrecht. It is also part of the Bordering lakes, a chain of lakes in The Netherlands. The Ketelmeer covers an area of 3500 hectares, most of which is in the province of Flevoland, but the river delta of the IJssel is in the Overijssel province.

It was carved out from the Zuiderzee by the construction of the polders of Noordoostpolder and Flevoland, between which it lies. It is via Ketelmeer that the IJsselmeer connects to the Zwarte Meer and the Veluwemeer, the strip of water which separates Flevoland from the coast of the mainland.

The Ketelmeer borders two buurtschappen, on the opposite sides of the lake: Ketelhaven on the south and Schokkerhaven on the north, both located roughly halfway the lake, though Ketelhaven is still located about one kilometer further to the east. Ketelhaven also has significantly more inhabitants.

The Ketelmeer contains the IJsseloog, a kilometre-diameter circular pit in an artificial island, built to contain the toxic sludge dredged from the bed of the Ketelmeer.

The Ketelbrug is a bascule bridge over the Ketelmeer connecting the Noordoostpolder and Oostelijk Flevoland.
