= Wijhe Ferry =

Cable ferry in the Netherlands

Coordinates: 52.392324°N 6.124964°E

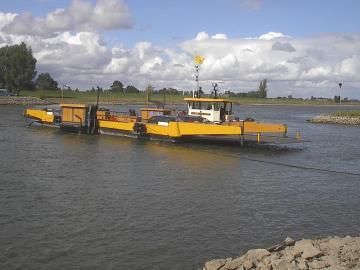
The Wijhe Ferry.

The Wijhe Ferry is a cable ferry across the IJssel in the Netherlands. The ferry crosses from Wijhe in Overijssel to Vorchten in Gelderland. The crossing is located some 17 kilometres (11 mi) south of Zwolle.
