= Groessen =

- Village
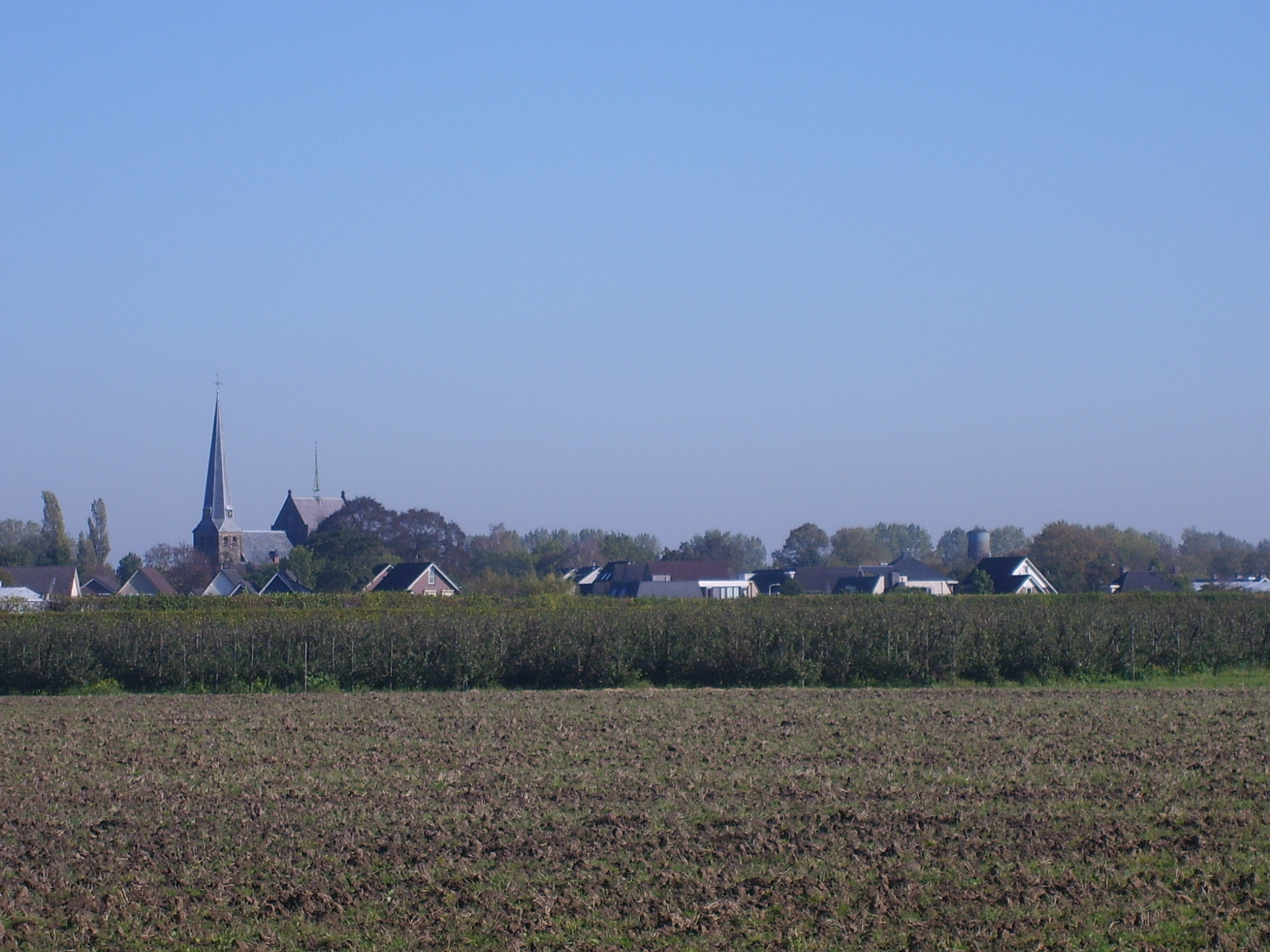

- Location in the Netherlands Groessen (Netherlands)
- Coordinates: 51.9305°N 6.0261°E
- Country: Netherlands
- Province: Gelderland
- Municipality: Duiven

Area
  - Total: 9.10 km^{2} (3.51 sq mi)
- Elevation: 11 m (36 ft)

Population (2021)
  - Total: 1,980
  - Density: 218/km^{2} (564/sq mi)
- Time zone: UTC+1 (CET)
  - Summer (DST): UTC+2 (CEST)
- Postal code: 6923
- Dialing code: 0316

Groessen is a village in the municipality of Duiven in the province of Gelderland, the Netherlands.

It was first mentioned in 838 in uilla Gruosna, and means "settlement in grassland". The village developed near the Rhine. The St Andreas Church was a tower from the 12th century. The church dates from around 1500, and has been enlarged in 1923. In 1840, it was home to 1,406 people.

== Gallery ==
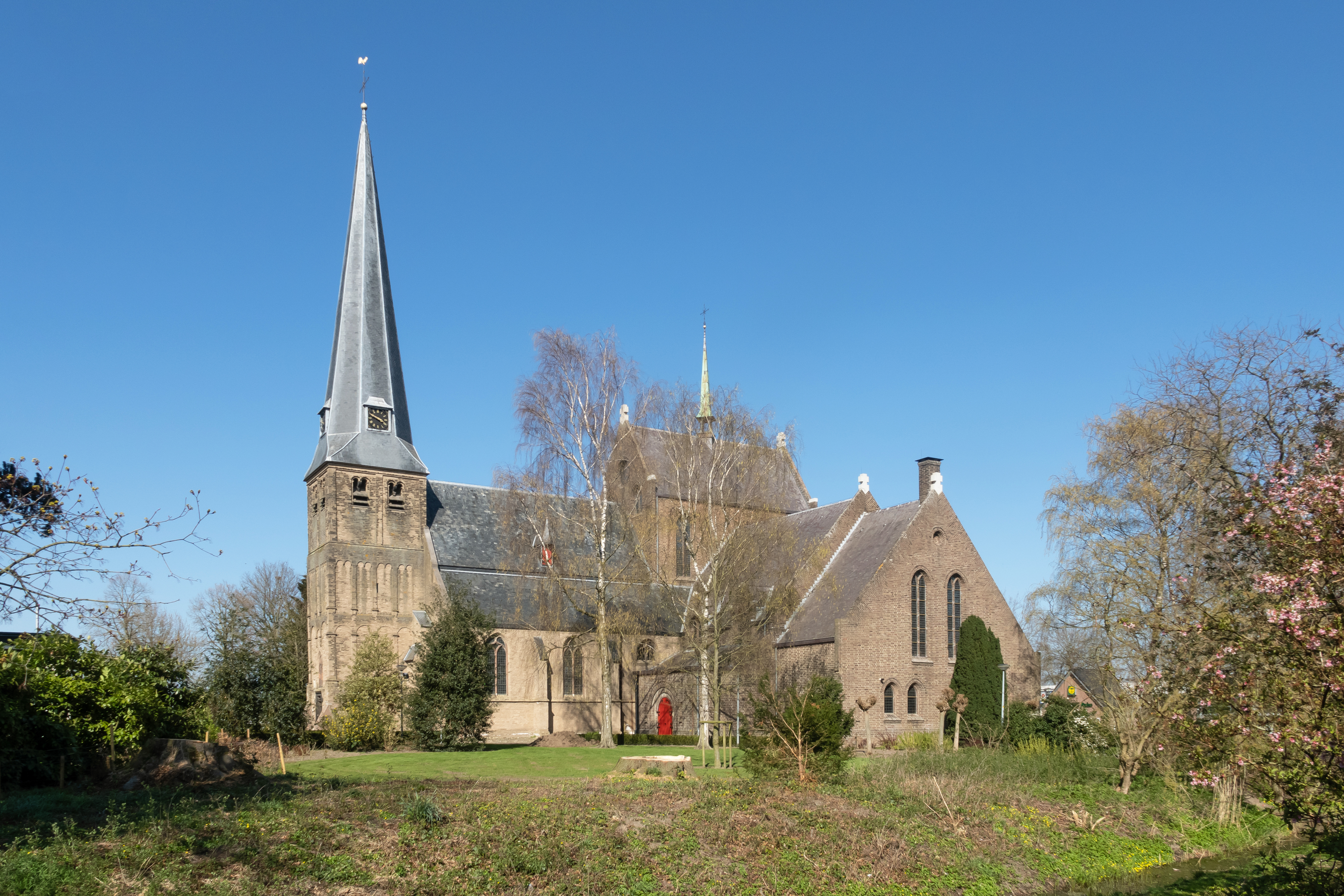
Sint Andreaskerk

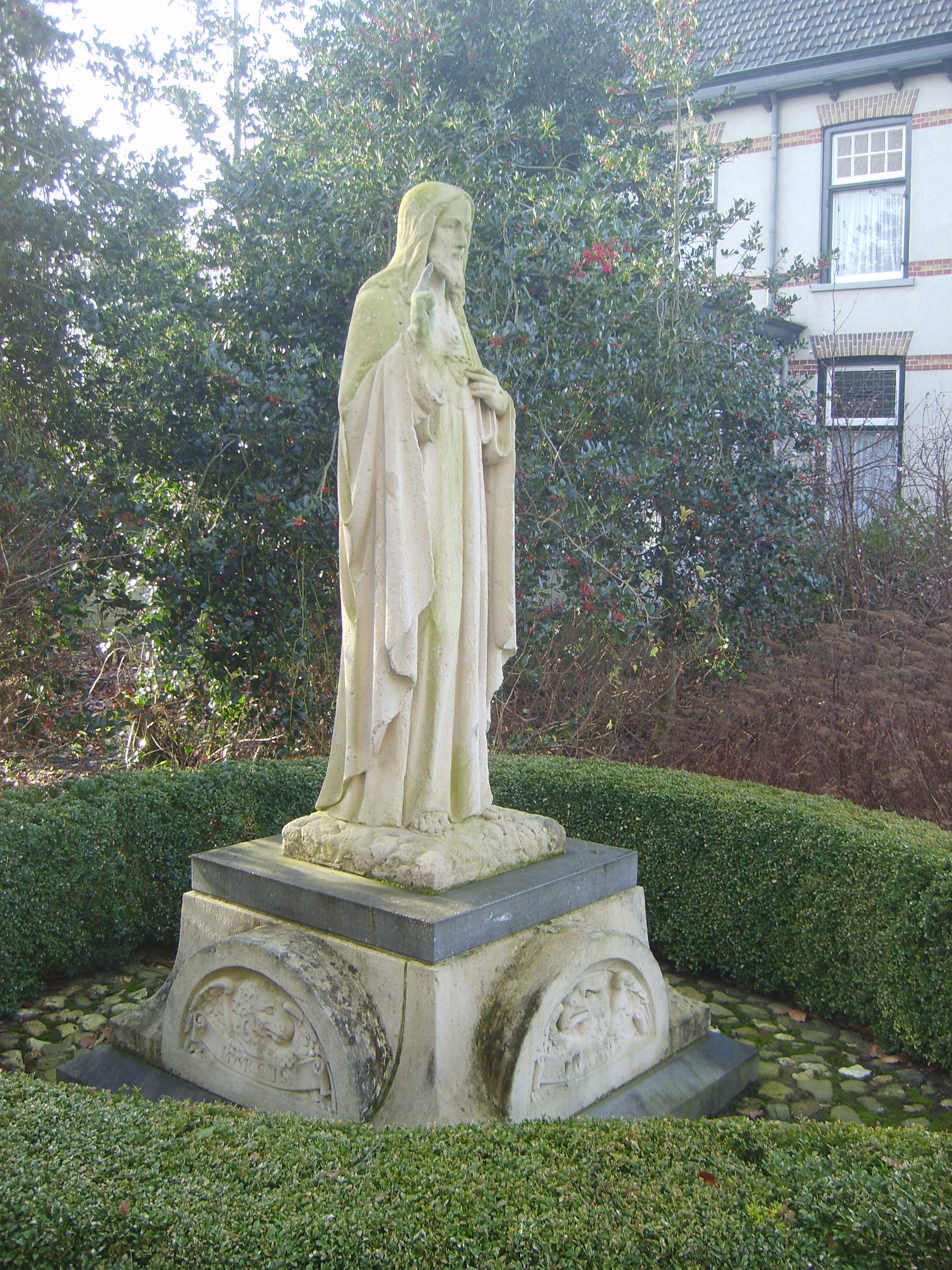
Statue of Sacred Heart of Jesus Christ

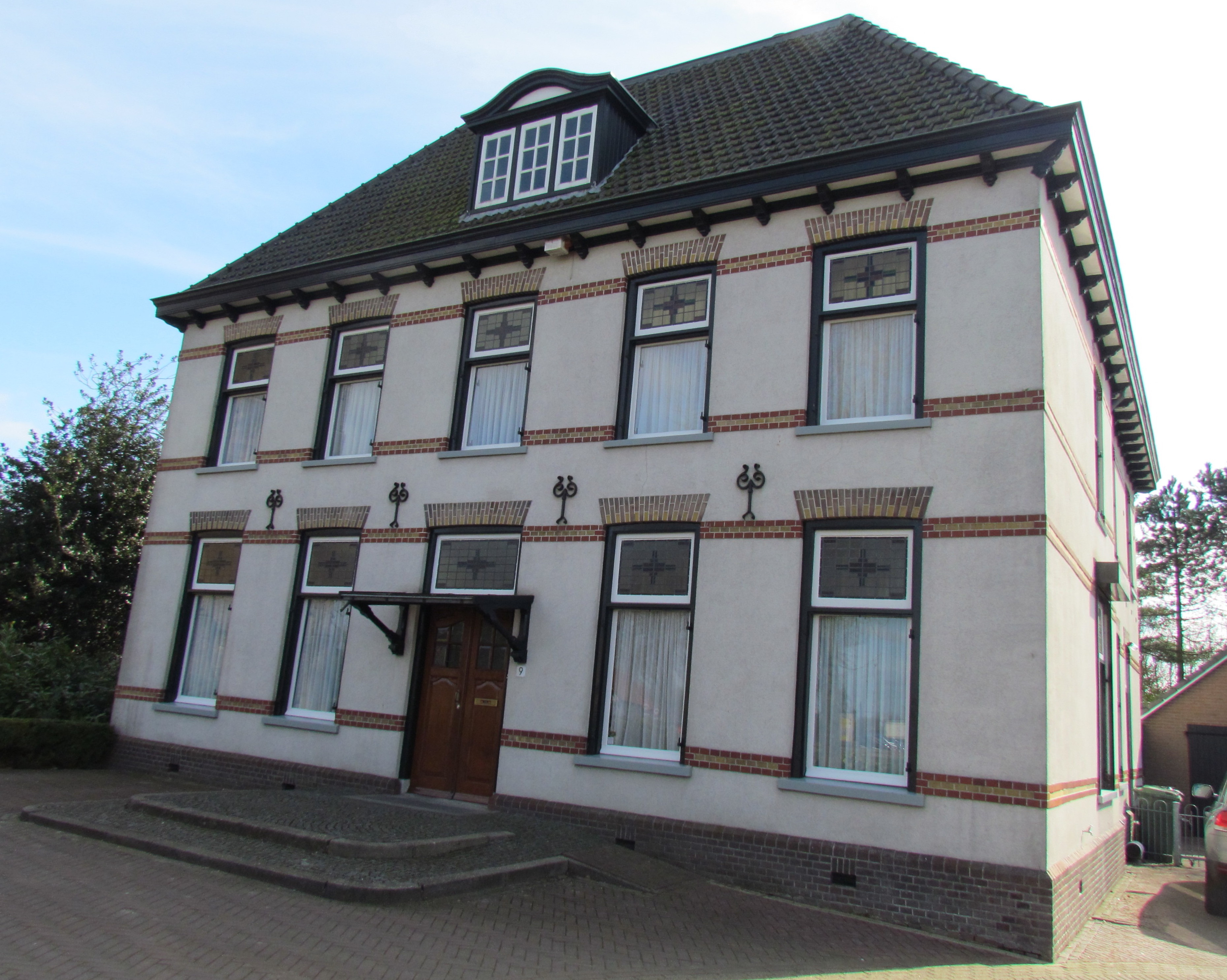
House in Groessen

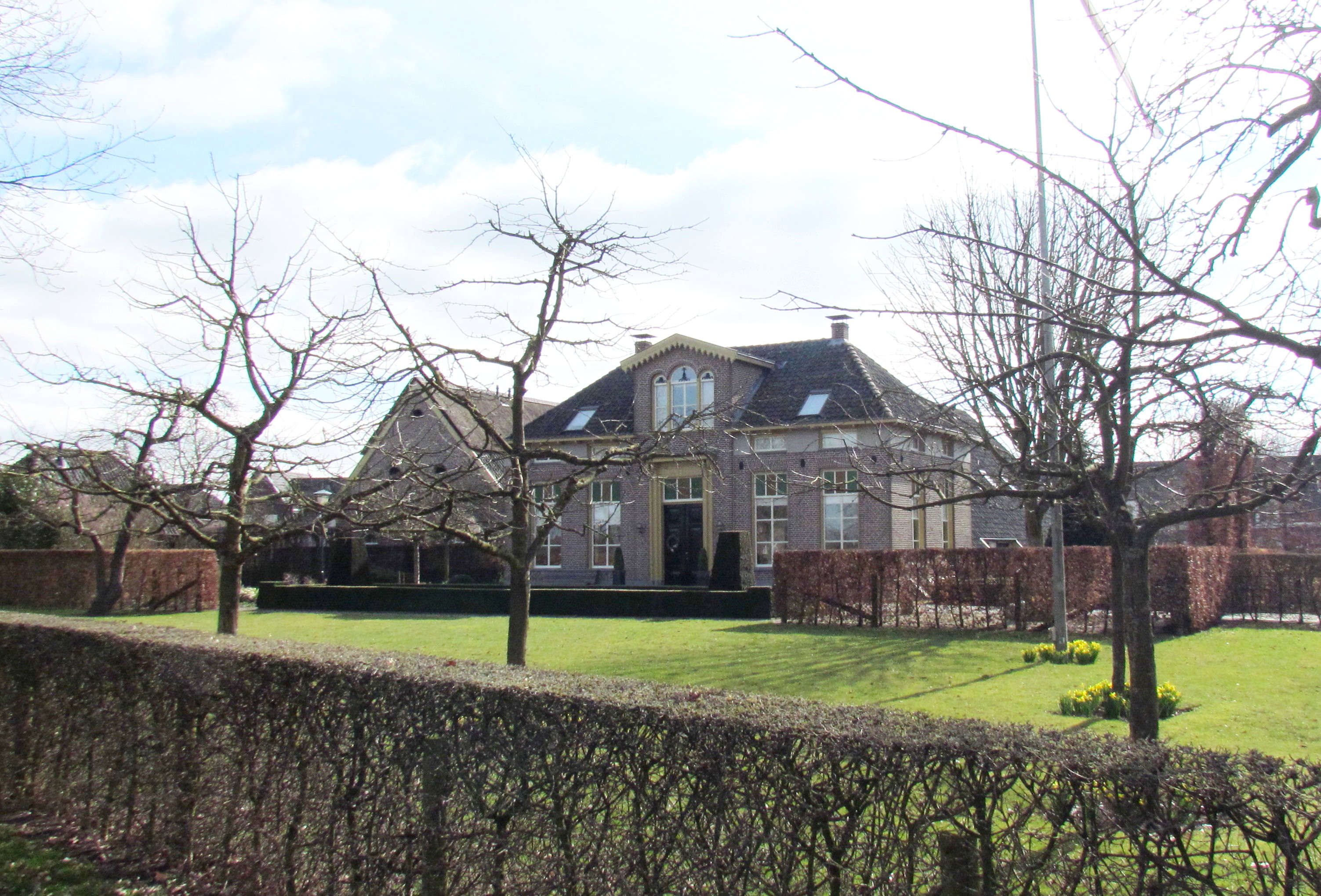
Farm in Groessen
