= IJssel =

River in the Netherlands

IJssel Gelderse IJssel
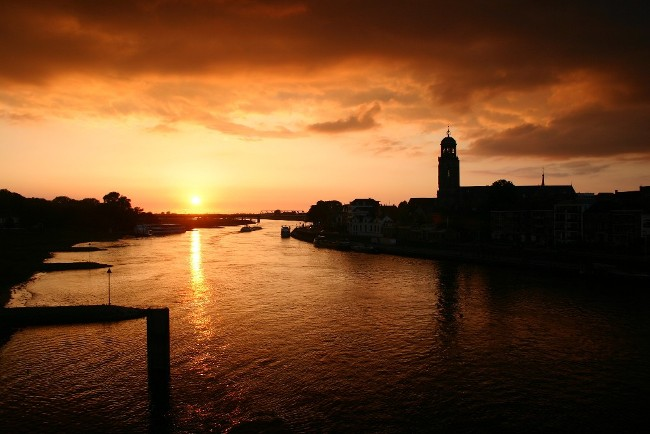
- Sunset on the IJssel at Deventer

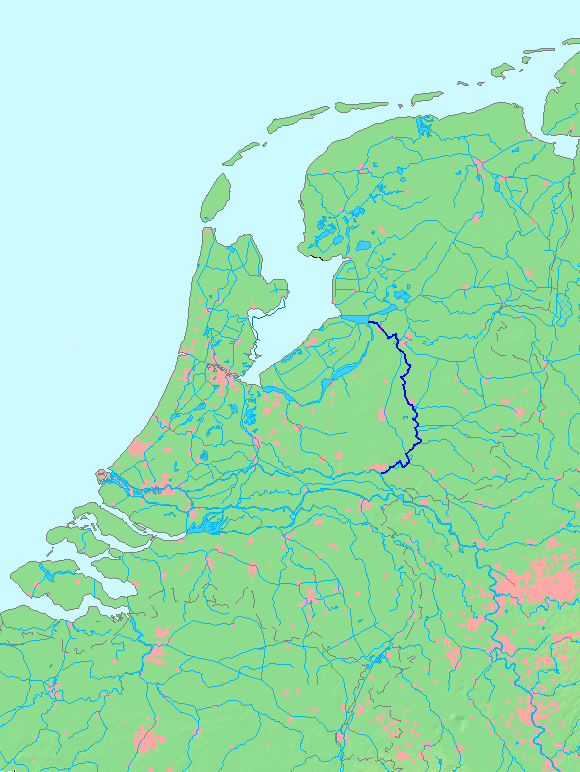
- Location of river IJssel in dark blue
- Native name: Iessel(t) (Dutch Low Saxon)

Location
- Country: Netherlands
- Provinces: Gelderland, Overijssel
- Districts: Liemers, Veluwe, Achterhoek, Salland
- Cities: Arnhem (suburbs), Doesburg, Zutphen, Deventer, Zwolle (suburbs), Kampen

Physical characteristics
- Source: Nederrijn
  - location: Westervoort, Gelderland, Netherlands
  - elevation: 6 metres
- Mouth: Ketelmeer (arm of below-sea-level channel east of the Flevopolder, Flevoland)
  - location: Kampen, Salland, Overijssel, Netherlands
  - coordinates: 52°34′58″N 5°50′24″E
  - elevation: −3 metres
- Length: 125 km (78 mi)
- Discharge
  - average: 340 m^{3}/s (12,000 cu ft/s)

Basin features
- Progression: Rhine, Pannerdens Kanaal, IJssel
- Tributaries
  - right: Oude IJssel, Berkel, Schipbeek

The IJssel (Note: In Dutch, both letters in the ⟨IJ⟩ digraph are capitalized together.) (Dutch: [ˈɛisəl]; Dutch Low Saxon: Iessel(t) [ˈisəl(t)]) is a Dutch distributary of the river Rhine that flows northward and ultimately discharges into the IJsselmeer (before the 1932 completion of the Afsluitdijk known as the Zuiderzee), a North Sea natural harbour.

It is sometimes called the Gelderse IJssel (IPA: [ˌɣɛldərsə ˈʔɛisəl]; "Gueldern IJssel") to distinguish it from the Hollandse IJssel. It is in the provinces of Gelderland and Overijssel, the latter of which was named after this river. The Romans knew the river as Isala. It flows from Westervoort, on the east side of the city of Arnhem.

Similar to the Nederrijn which shares its short inflow, the Pannerdens Kanaal, it is a minor discharge of the Rhine. At the fork where the Kanaal is sourced the Rhine takes the name the Waal. This splitting-off is west of the German border. The Waal in turn interweaves with other rivers and the lower course of the Nederrijn, which altogether is known as the Rhine–Meuse–Scheldt delta.

The name contains the digraph ij, used throughout modern Dutch orthography, which is why both letters appear capitalized (as in: IJmuiden and IJsselmeer).

== Etymology ==
The name IJssel (older Isla, Isala, from *Īsalō), is thought to either have been derived from a Proto-Indo-European root *eis- "to move quickly" (Old Norse eisa "to race forward", Latin ira "anger") or a possible Old European stratum source.

The two earliest surviving Old Dutch attestations of the IJssel's name, from 797 and 814 AD, were of a Hisla. The h disappeared over the next few centuries, with forms that included Ysola, Ysla, and Isla being attested over the next few centuries.

== History ==
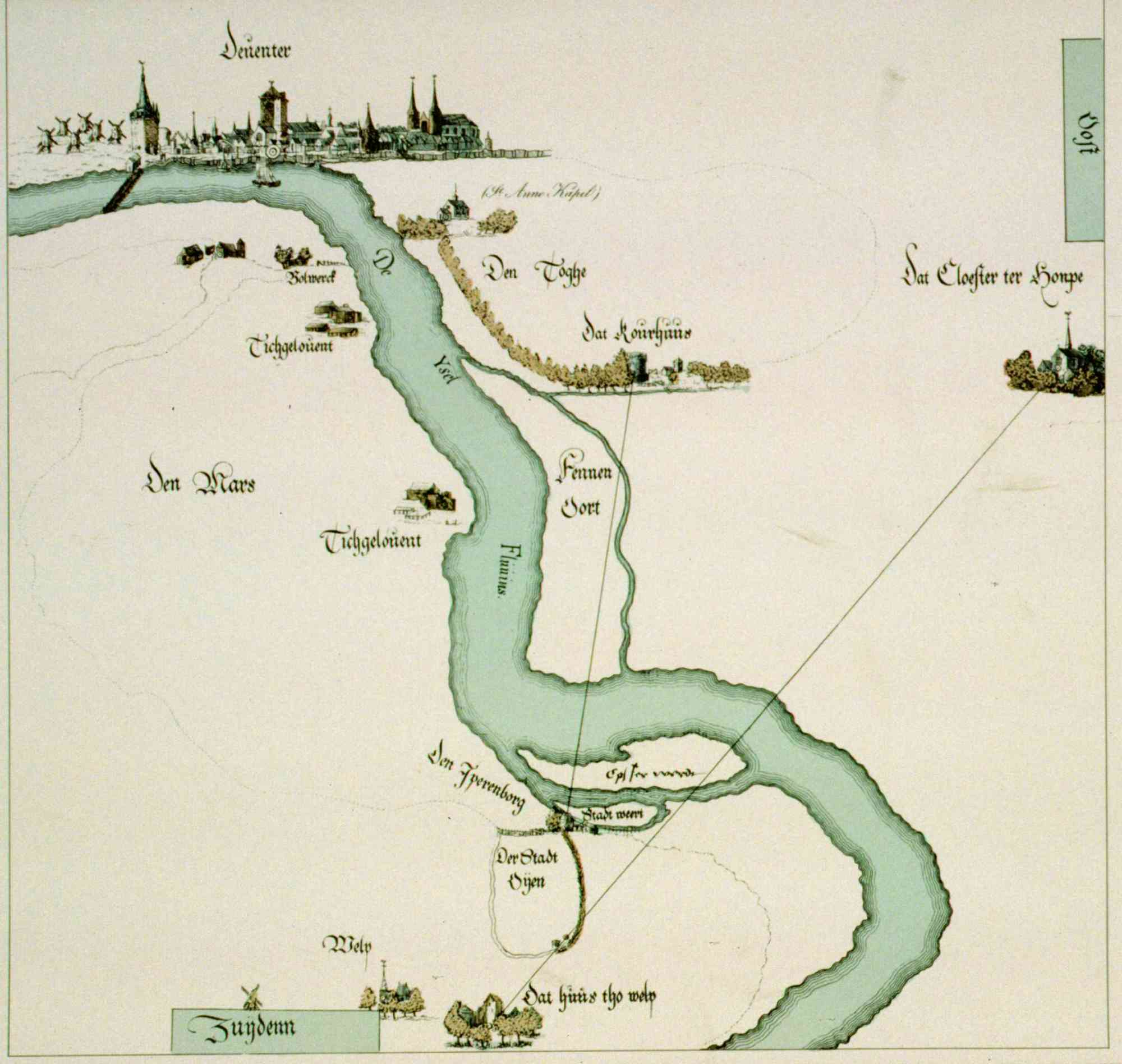
The IJssel at Deventer in 1567

Before the Roman Warm Period, the Zuiderzee in highly glaciated times was a brackish, sometimes tidal, very broad set of mudflats, the Vlies (Latin: Flevo). The IJssel and Amstel kept a saline-freshwater balance, and northward flow, enabling islands and banks to build up. Among these are rare zones just above sea level: Kampen, Elburg and north-east bank once wooded strip from Nijemirdum to Stavoren.

However, the North Sea, locally to form (or re-form) the Zuiderzee, reasserted itself – the so-called Dunkirk transgressions.

By the time these were tamed (terraformed) the IJssel had formed many of its new short distributaries to dissipate its flow. The submerged old delta is traceable out from its sea level elevation point at Zwolle throughout the broadest parts of the IJsselmeer; the lands of Emmeloord, Lelystad and south of Dronten are relatively recent reclamations. They were continuations of these old, broad troughs, and lie six metres below sea level.

The name Vlie refers to a strait between sea islands, Vlieland and Terschelling. It seems that the firmly below-sea-level excoriations in the far north (the Groote Vliet) by Medemblik and the IJ (near Amsterdam) were all deep parts of the same body of water in the height of the Roman Warm Period and Medieval Dark Age sea rises (transgressions). Most of the surrounding basin of the vast harbour-like body of water of the Netherlands is reclaimed from it (nationally called polderisation; in England called the making of a fen).

The river was a natural barrier and in April 1945 was stormed by assault troops of the Allied armies liberating the Netherlands from the occupying forces of Nazi Germany.

=== The IJssel as the lower part of the Oude IJssel ===
Most of the IJssel was the lower part of the small river Oude IJssel (lit. "Old IJssel", German Issel), that rises in Germany and is now a 70 km tributary. The connection between the Rhine and IJssel was probably artificial, allegedly dug by men under the Roman general Nero Claudius Drusus c. 12 BCE as a defence against Germanic tribes and to let Roman ships carry troops along it.

The Oude IJssel is the second-largest contributor to the flow of the river, after the Rhine.

The source of the Oude IJssel is near Borken in North Rhine-Westphalia, Germany. First it flows south-west until it nearly reaches the Rhine near Wesel; then it turns west northwest. After skirting Isselburg it crosses the border with the Netherlands. The river then flows through Doetinchem and joins the IJssel at Doesburg.

== Characteristics ==
The average daily discharge can change greatly. It has been, over long periods, averaged as about 300 cubic meters per second. It can be as low as 140 and as high as 1800, depending on the velocity of the water arriving from upstream and the weirs west of Arnhem, which control the water taken in. These control the Pannerdens Kanaal, the sole inflow (shared with the Nederrijn).

As a lowland river in which velocity decreases, the IJssel meanders. Some bends (and spurs of land, hank) have been cut off by man such as near Rheden and Doesburg, reducing the length from 146 km to 125 km, but not as radically as the Meuse nor Great Ouse. Deposition of sediment to form islands in the outside of bends has been curtailed since the late nineteenth century.

=== The IJssel as a Rhine distributary ===
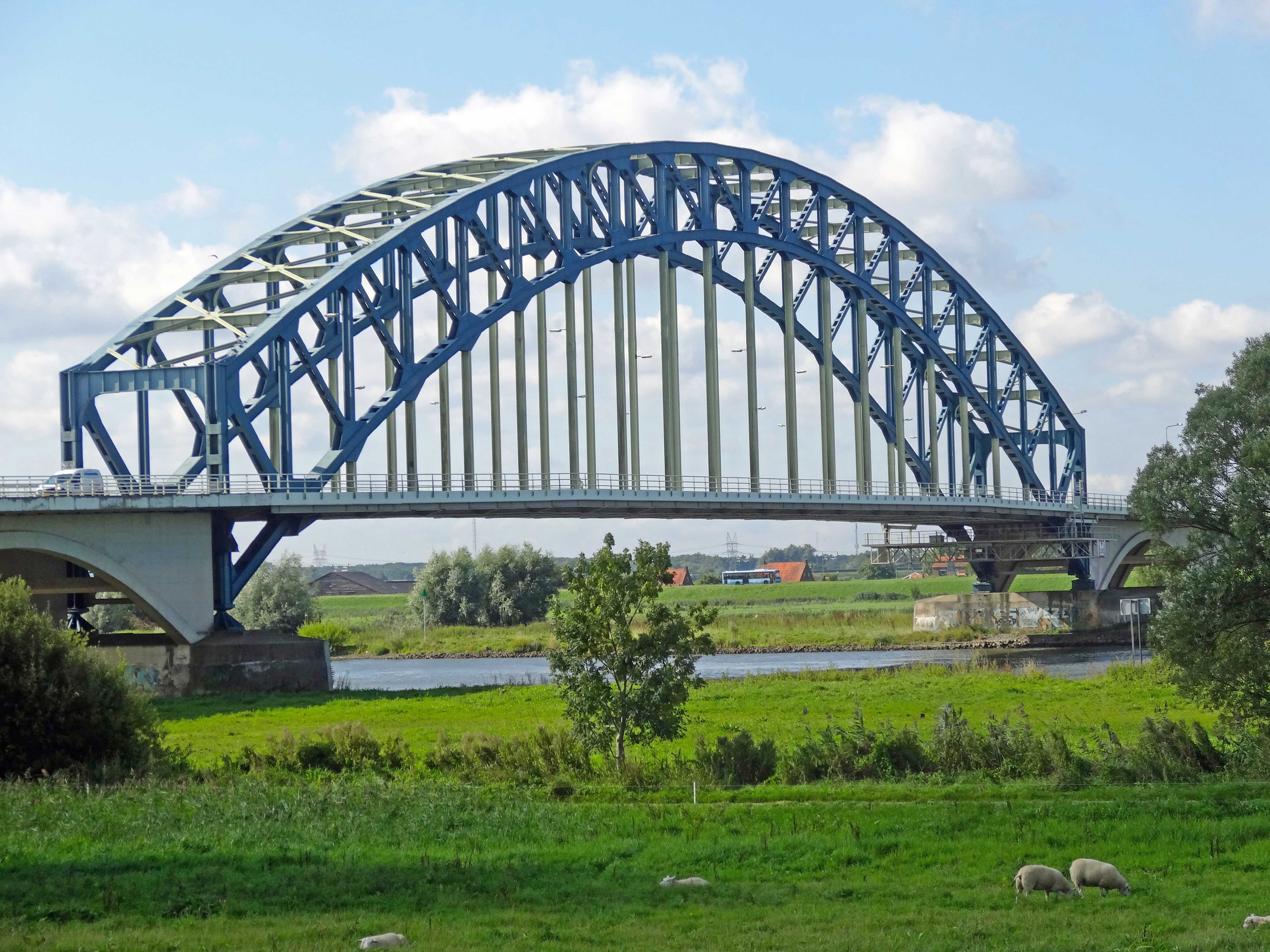
Bridge over the IJssel at Zwolle

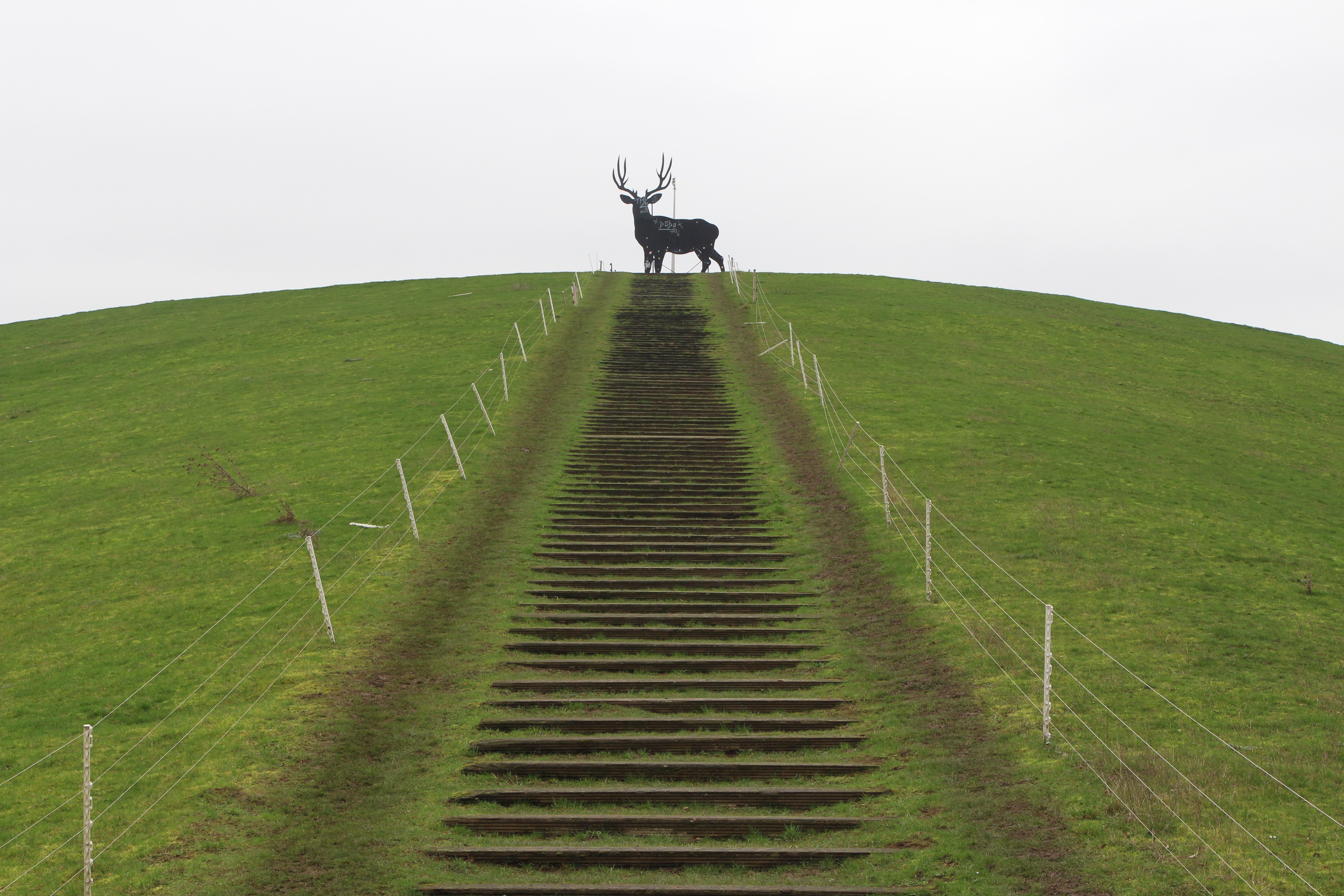
At IJsseloord (close to Arnhem) the IJssel parts from the Rhine. This statue 'Het Rijnhert' on a hill close to the highway is a symbol for the connection of the city to the nearby national park, the Hoge Veluwe.

Since the connection between the Rhine and IJssel was dug, the Rhine became the main contributor to the flow of the IJssel – a small fraction of the former's flow makes up the upper IJssel. Various tributaries add a little or much water to the flow of the IJssel, such as the Berkel and Schipbeek streams from relatively local precipitation. The IJssel, if accepted as a branch of the Rhine-Meuse-Scheldt delta, is the only one that takes up tributary rivers rather than giving rise to distributaries. It has no contact with the Meuse, nor Scheldt, nor their resultant watercourses.

In the last few miles of the river's run, near the city of Kampen, distributaries form, resulting in a quite small delta. Some of these have been dammed up to lower the risk of flooding. Some have silted up. Others flow without interruption. Most of the damming-up was done before 1932, when the Zuiderzee was turned into the freshwater IJsselmeer lake. The whole delta had been prone to flooding in times of northwestern gales, pushing back the saline Zuiderzee water into the delta.

The modern-day names of the delta branches are, west to east, the:

- Keteldiep
- Kattendiep
- Noorddiep (local drainage ditch only)
- Ganzendiep
- Goot

Of these, the first-stated two are the main navigations. The Noorddiep has been stopped up at both ends. Another branch, De Garste, had already completely silted up by the middle of the nineteenth century. Until about 1900, the Ganzendiep up to the Goot fork was known as IJssel proper as was the historical main channel. The present main channel was named the Regtediep or Rechterdiep until well into the twentieth century.

The IJssel, now mainly a Rhine branch as to its water, has retained most of the character of a distinct river in its own right. It has its own tributaries and, as to the Old IJssel (Oude IJssel), a former headstream.

=== Tributaries and connecting canals ===
The following canals, long ditches and tributary streams feed the IJssel, in downstream order:

- Apeldoorns Kanaal (west) near the town of Dieren
- river Oude IJssel (east) at the city of Doesburg
- the Berkel stream (east) at the city of Zutphen
- the Twentekanaal (east) between Zutphen and the village of Eefde (municipality of Gorssel)
- the Schipbeek stream (east) near the city of Deventer
- the Grift stream (west) at the town of Hattem; its lower reaches have been channelised to form the mouth of the Griftkanaal
- the Willemsvaart canal (east) at the city of Zwolle
- the Zwolle-IJsselkanaal (east) near Zwolle

== River crossings ==
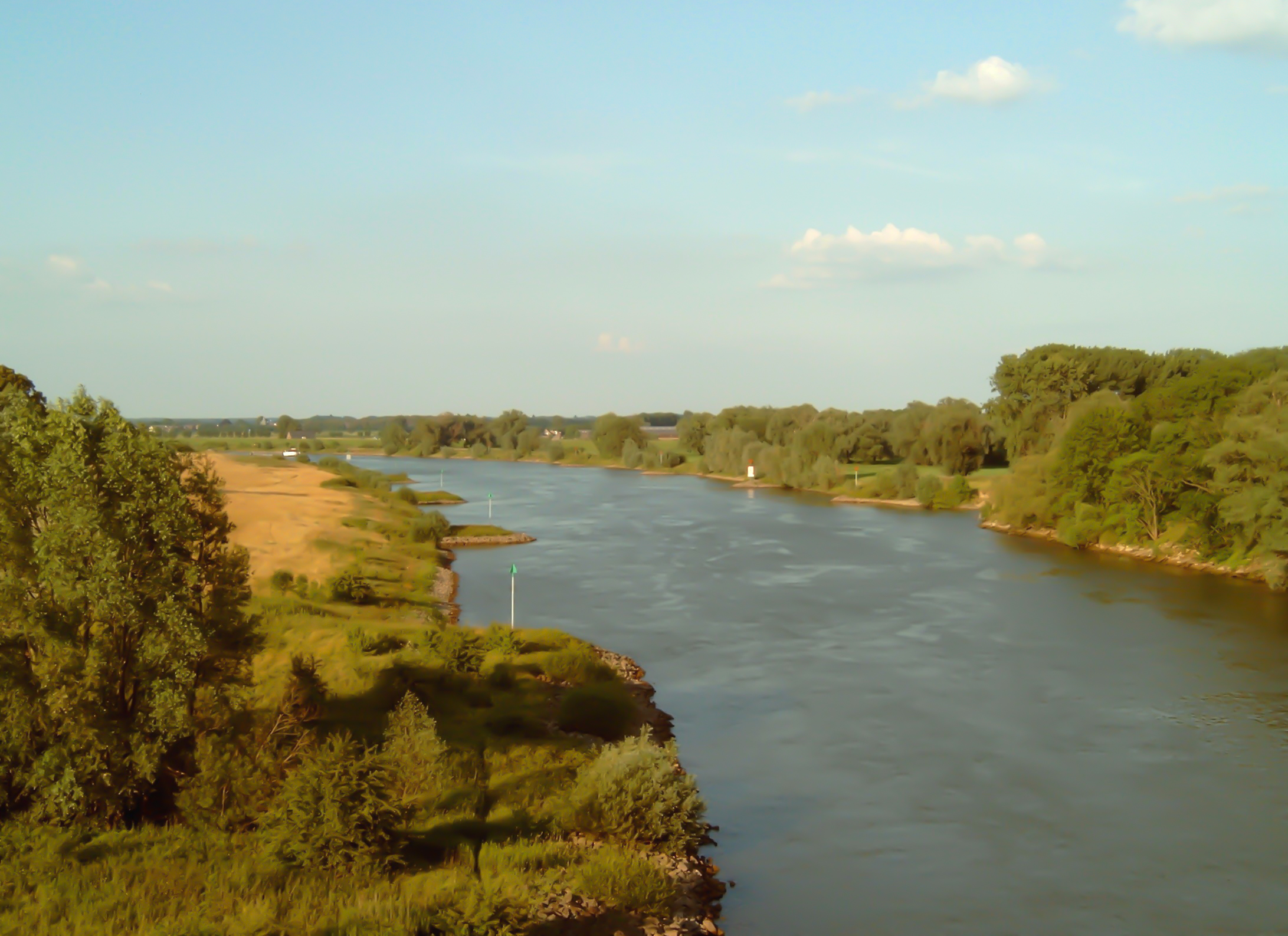
IJssel near Velp

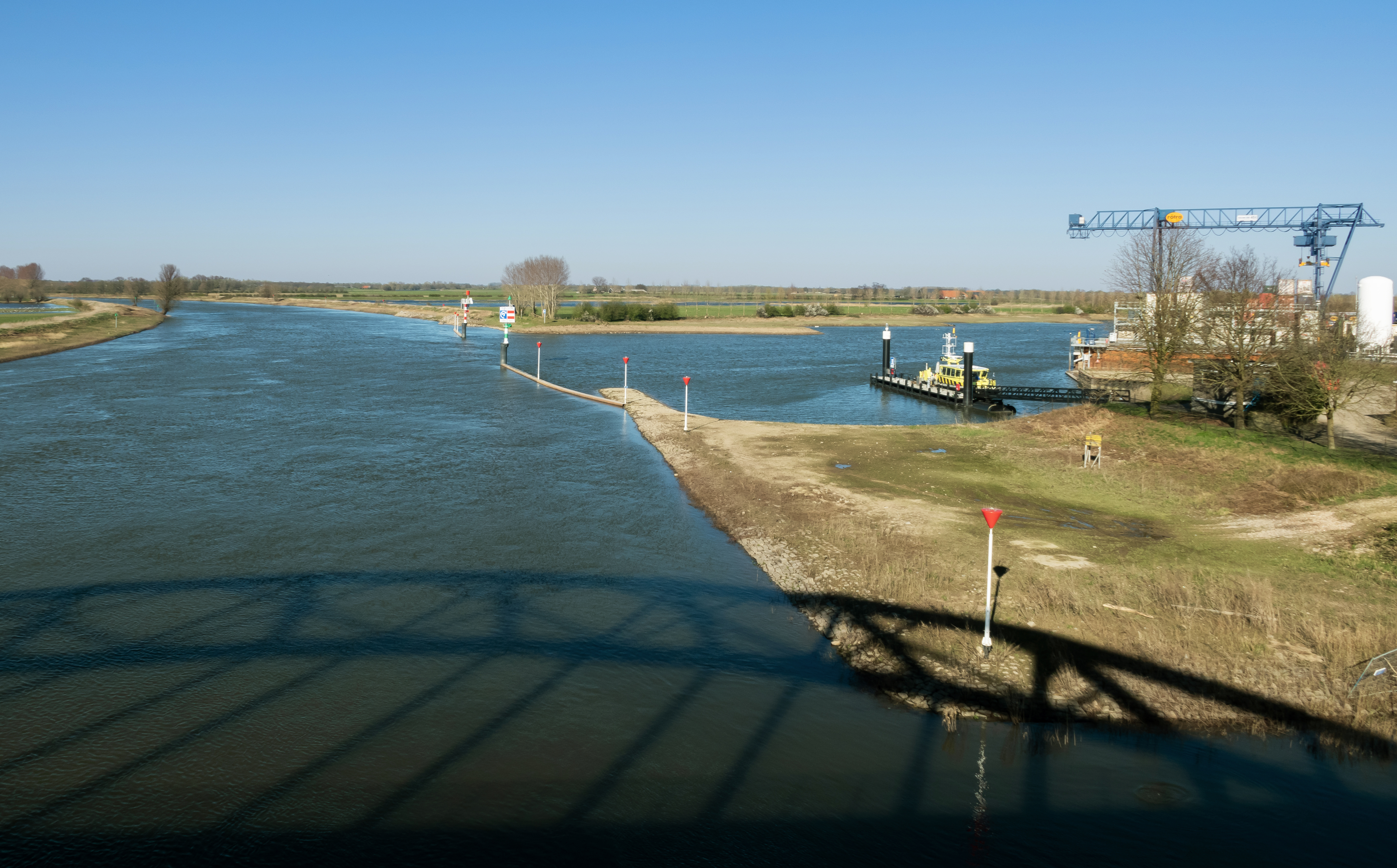
IJssel near Doesburg

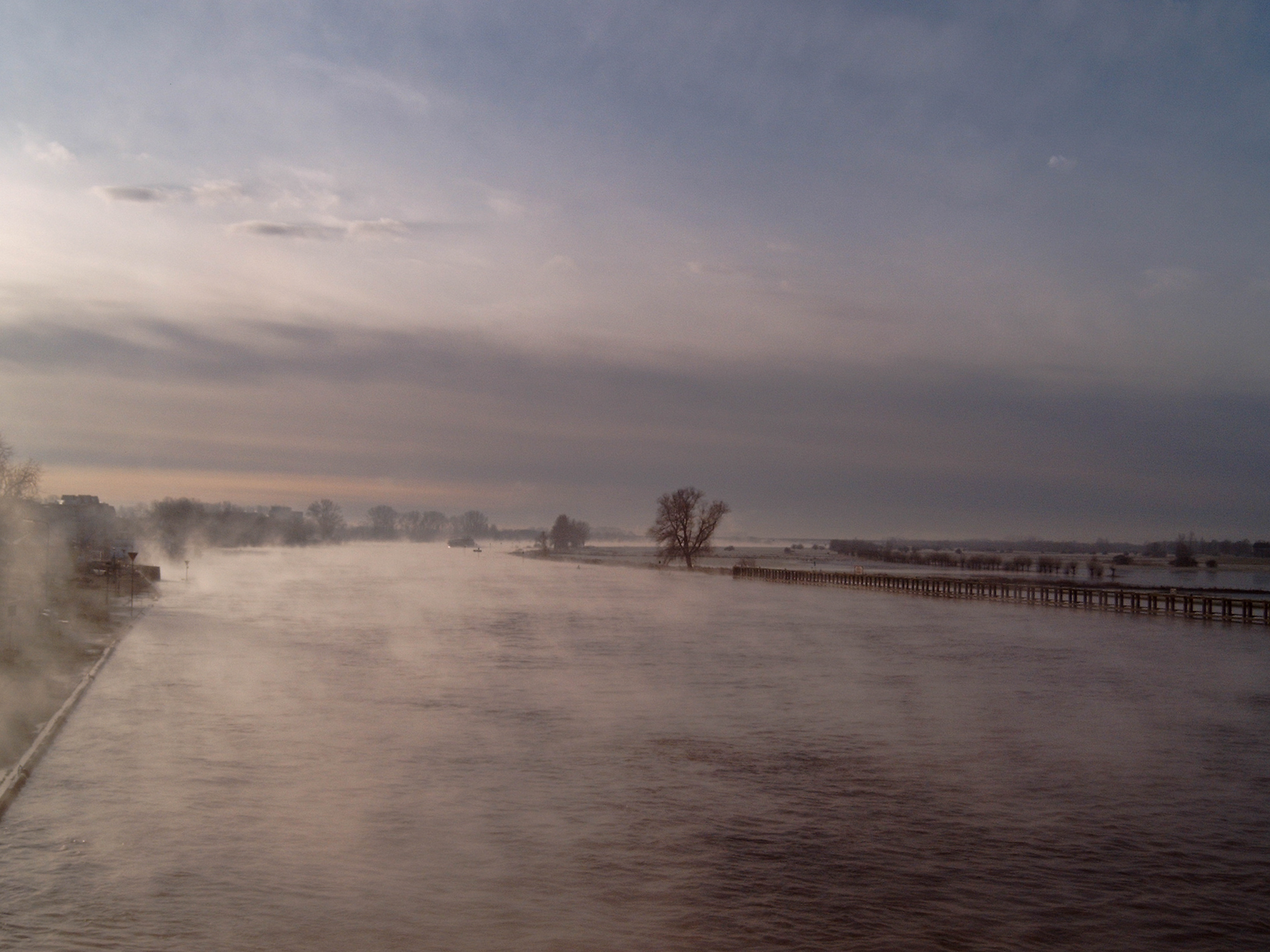
IJssel near Zutphen

=== Road bridges ===
Road bridges across river IJssel (with nearest places on the left and right bank):

- Arnhem – Westervoort
- Arnhem – Duiven (A12 motorway)
- Ellecom – Doesburg (N317)
- Brummen – Zutphen (N348)
- Zutphen – Zutphen
- Wilp – Deventer (A1 motorway)
- Deventer – Deventer (N344)
- Hattem – Zwolle
- Hattemerbroek – Zwolle (A28 motorway)
- Kampen – Kampen (N764)
- Kampen – Kampen
- Kampen – Kampereiland (N50)

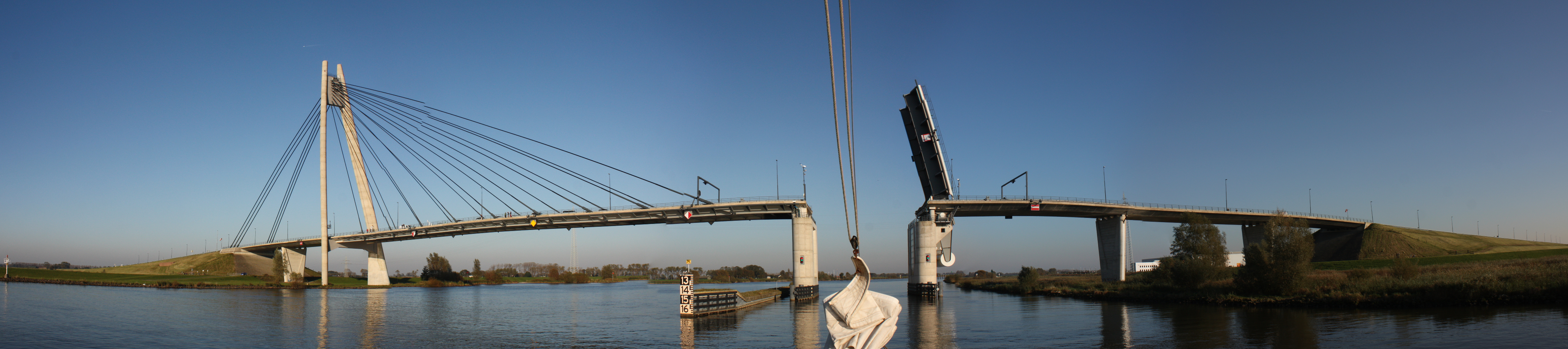
Eilandbrug (2003) Kampen (N50) Panorama

=== Railroad bridges ===
Railroad bridges (with nearest train station on the left and right bank):

- Arnhem Velperpoort – Westervoort
- Brummen/Klarenbeek – Zutphen
- Twello – Deventer
- Wezep/Kampen Zuid – Zwolle

=== Cable ferries ===
Only those ferries capable of carrying motorised vehicles are included.

- Dieren – Olburgen
- Brummen – Bronkhorst
- Welsum – Olst
- Vorchten – Wijhe
