= Duiven =

- Municipality
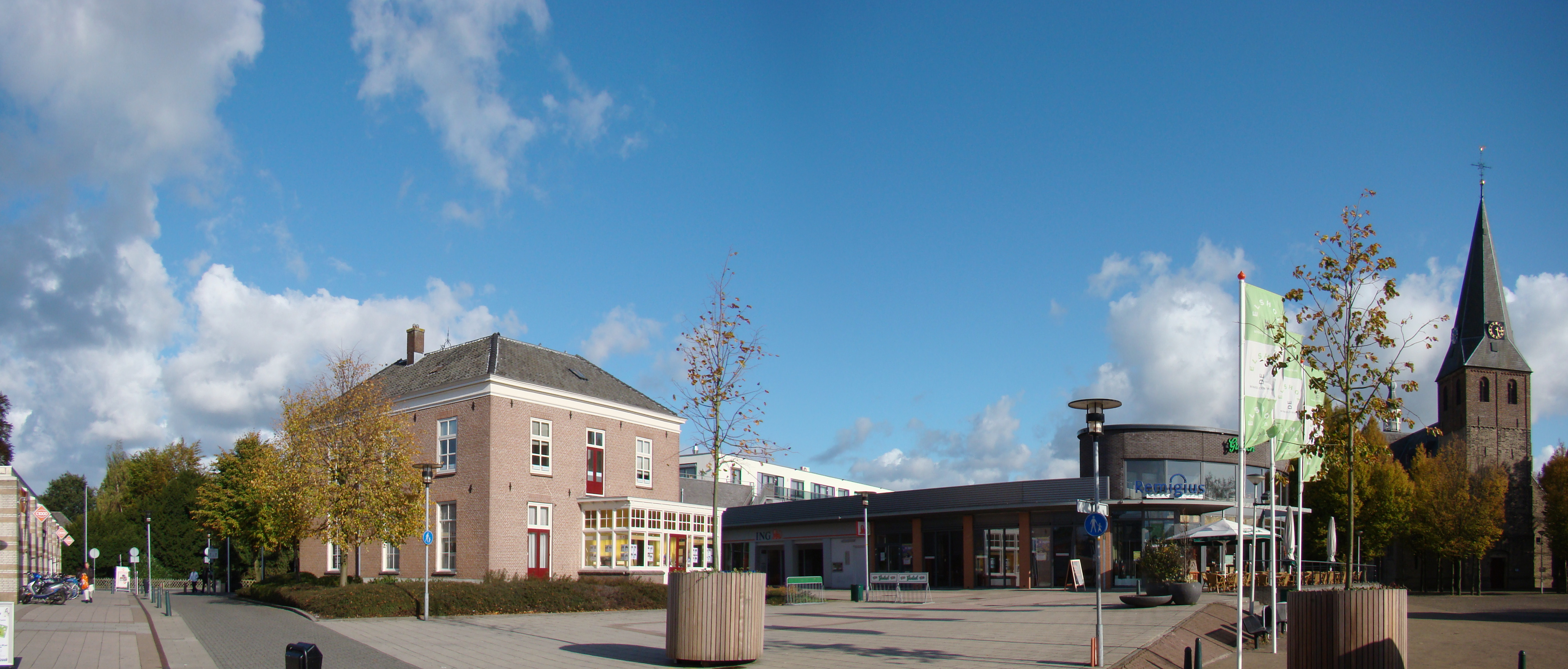
- Duiven town centre

- Flag Coat of arms

- Location in Gelderland
- Coordinates: 51°57′N 6°2′E
- Country: Netherlands
- Province: Gelderland

Government
  - Body: Municipal council
  - Mayor: Huub Hieltjes ((VVD))

Area
  - Total: 35.19 km^{2} (13.59 sq mi)
  - Land: 33.90 km^{2} (13.09 sq mi)
  - Water: 1.29 km^{2} (0.50 sq mi)
- Elevation: 10 m (33 ft)

Population (January 2021)
  - Total: 25,066
  - Density: 739/km^{2} (1,910/sq mi)
- Time zone: UTC+1 (CET)
  - Summer (DST): UTC+2 (CEST)
- Postcode: 6920–6924
- Area code: 0316
- Website: www.duiven.nl

Duiven (Dutch pronunciation: [ˈdœyvə(n)]) is a municipality and a town in the eastern Netherlands. Duiven's name can be translated into English to mean "pigeons" or "doves". Although the coat of arms and logo of the municipality feature pigeons, the name is etymologically related to "dunes" (Dutch: duinen). The flag of the municipality of Duiven was granted and adopted on 25 June 1954.

== Population centres ==
Villages:

- Duiven
- Groessen
- Loo

Hamlets:

- De Eng
- Helhoek
- Nieuwgraaf

=== Topography ===
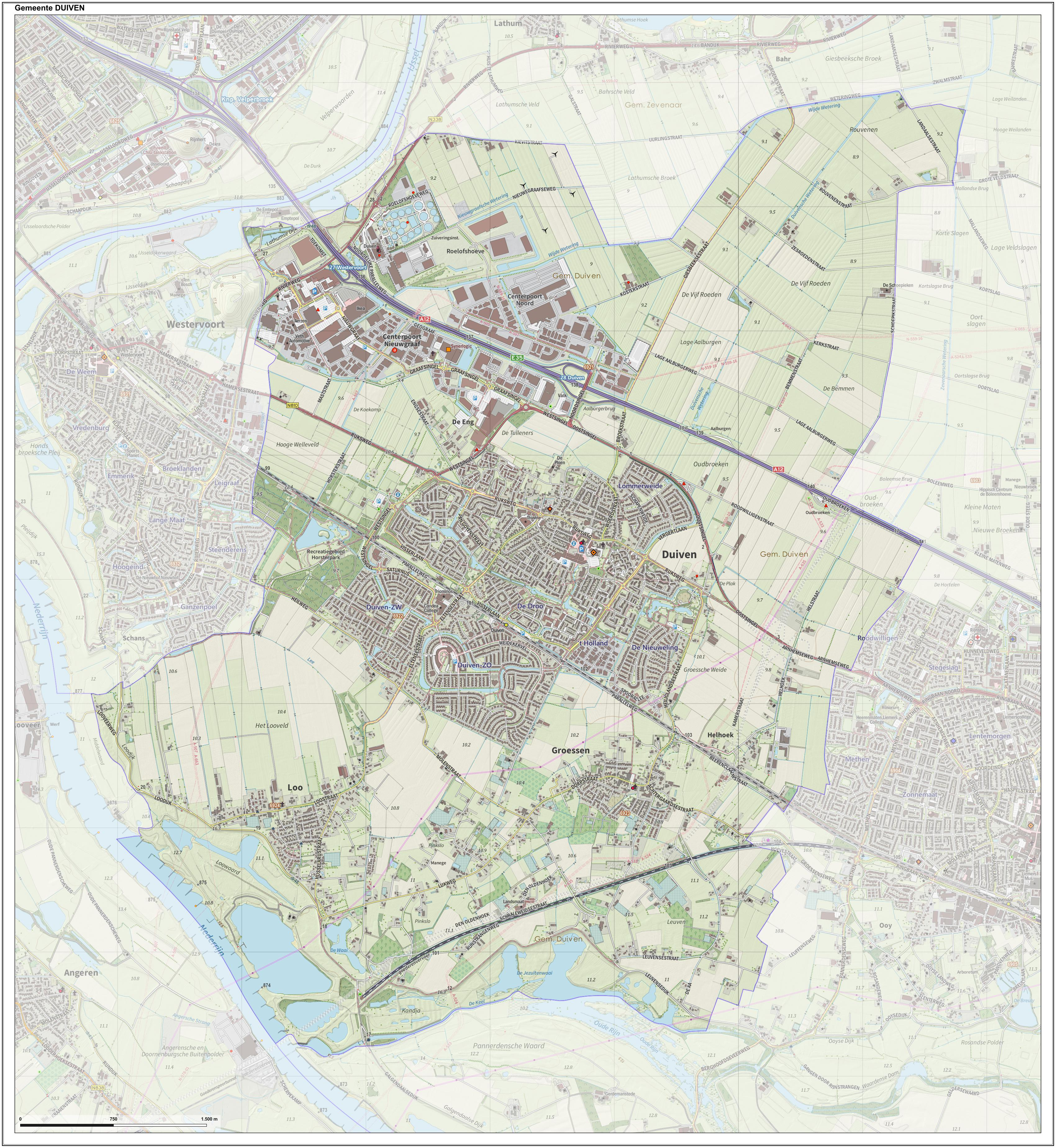

Dutch Topographic map of the municipality of Duiven, June 2015

== Transportation ==
- Duiven railway station is served by trains from Arnhem to Doetinchem and Winterswijk.

On weekdays there are 4 trains per hour between Arnhem and Doetinchem, with two of these continuing to Winterswijk. On weekends there are 2 trains per hour between Arnhem and Winterswijk.

== Notable people ==
- Dean Koolhof (born 1994) a Dutch professional footballer, with over 100 club caps, plays for Helmond Sport

== Twin towns ==
Duiven is twinned with:

- Gemünden am Main, Bavaria, Germany

== Gallery ==
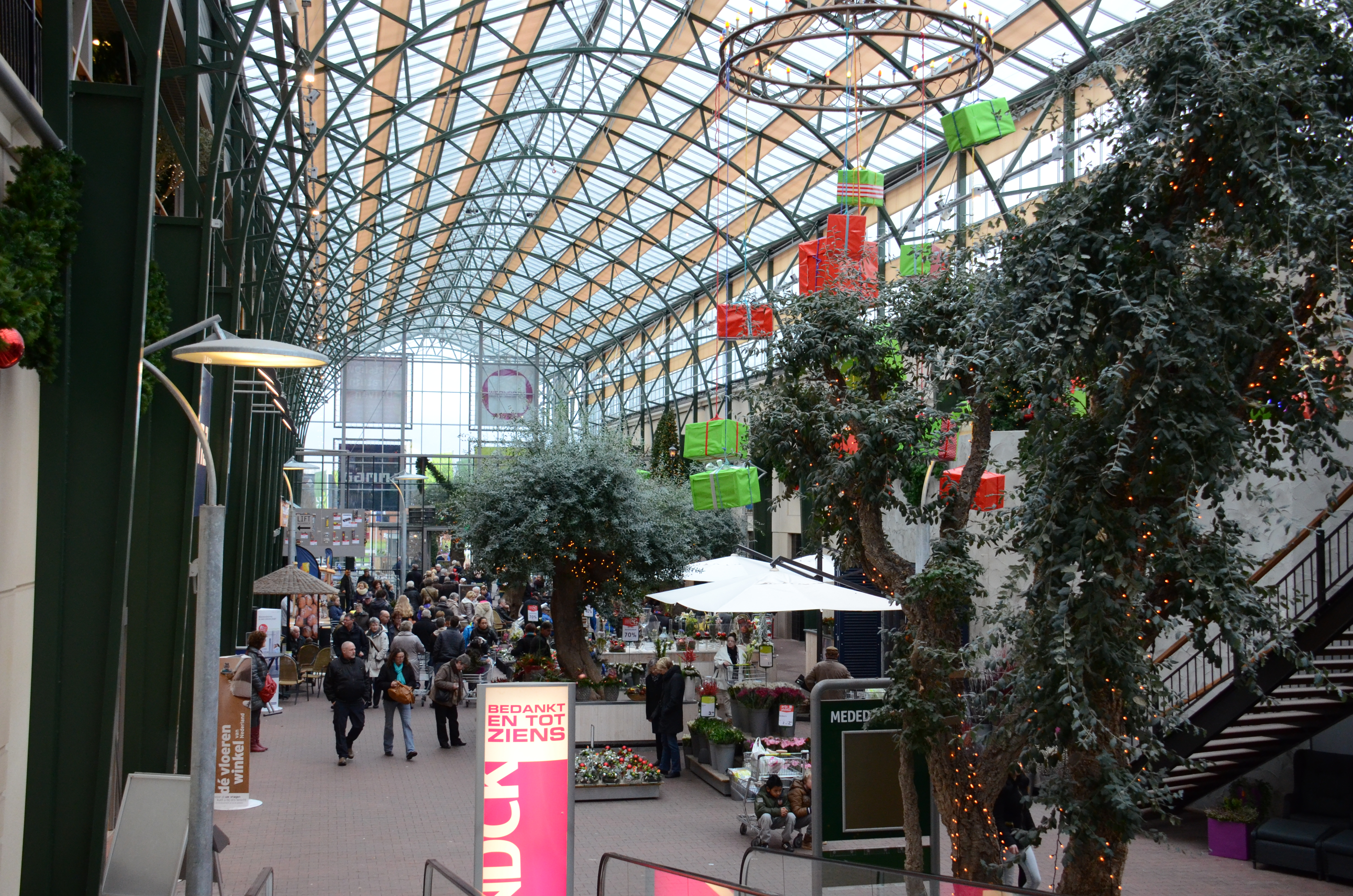
Duiven Plaza Intratuin

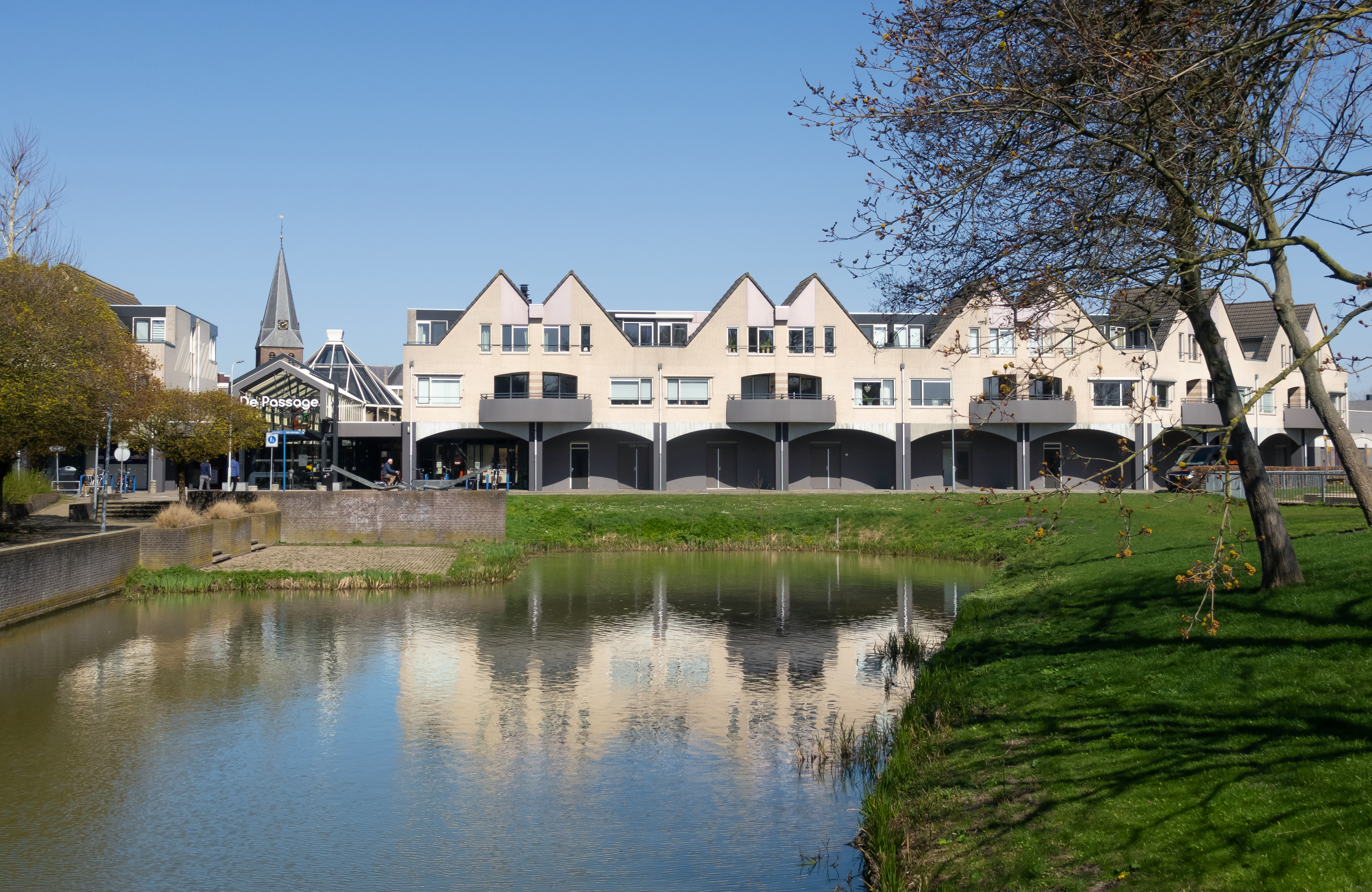
Duiven, view of De Passage shopping centre, from the bridge next to IKC Remigius

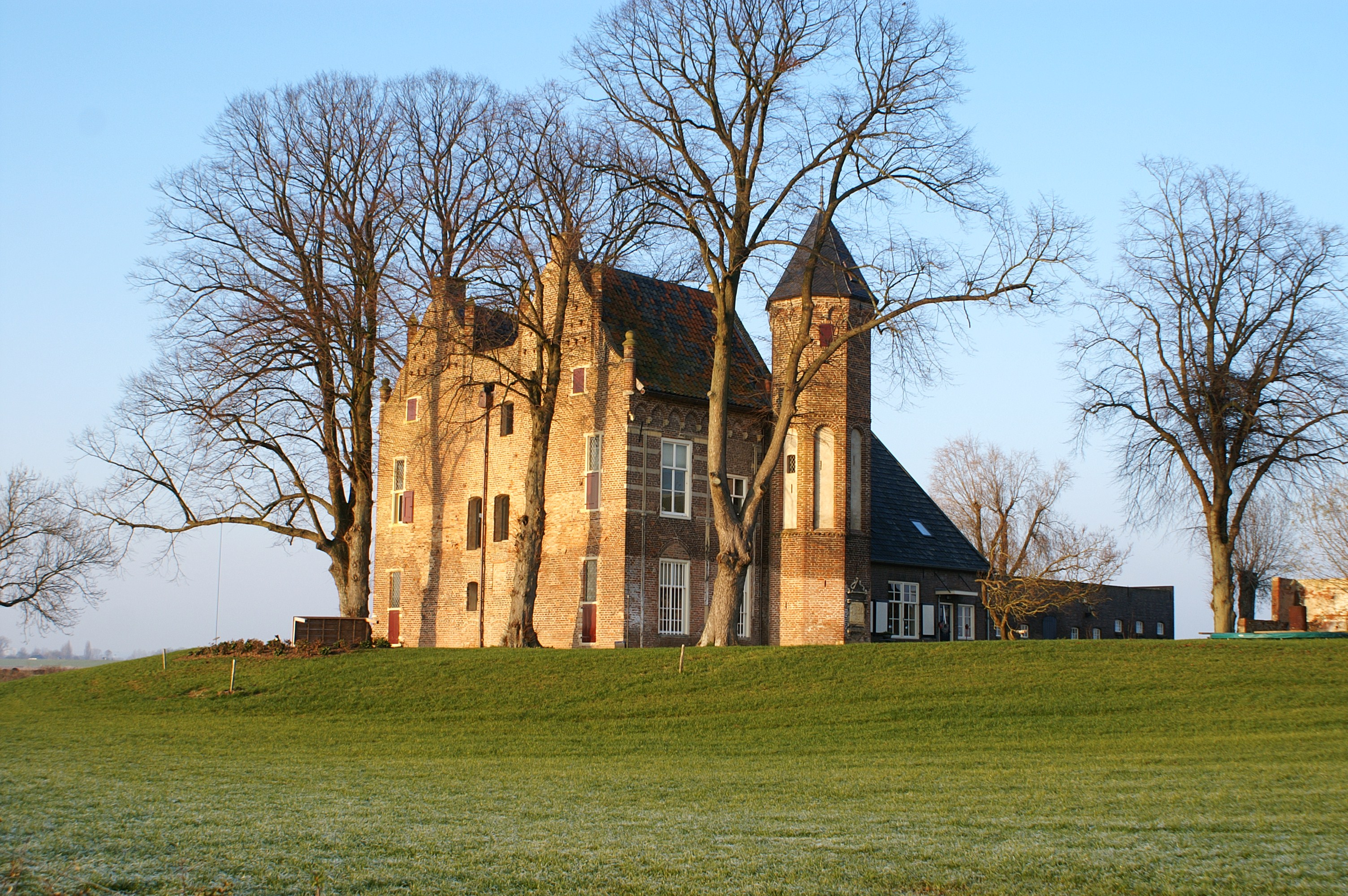
Loowaerd, Loo

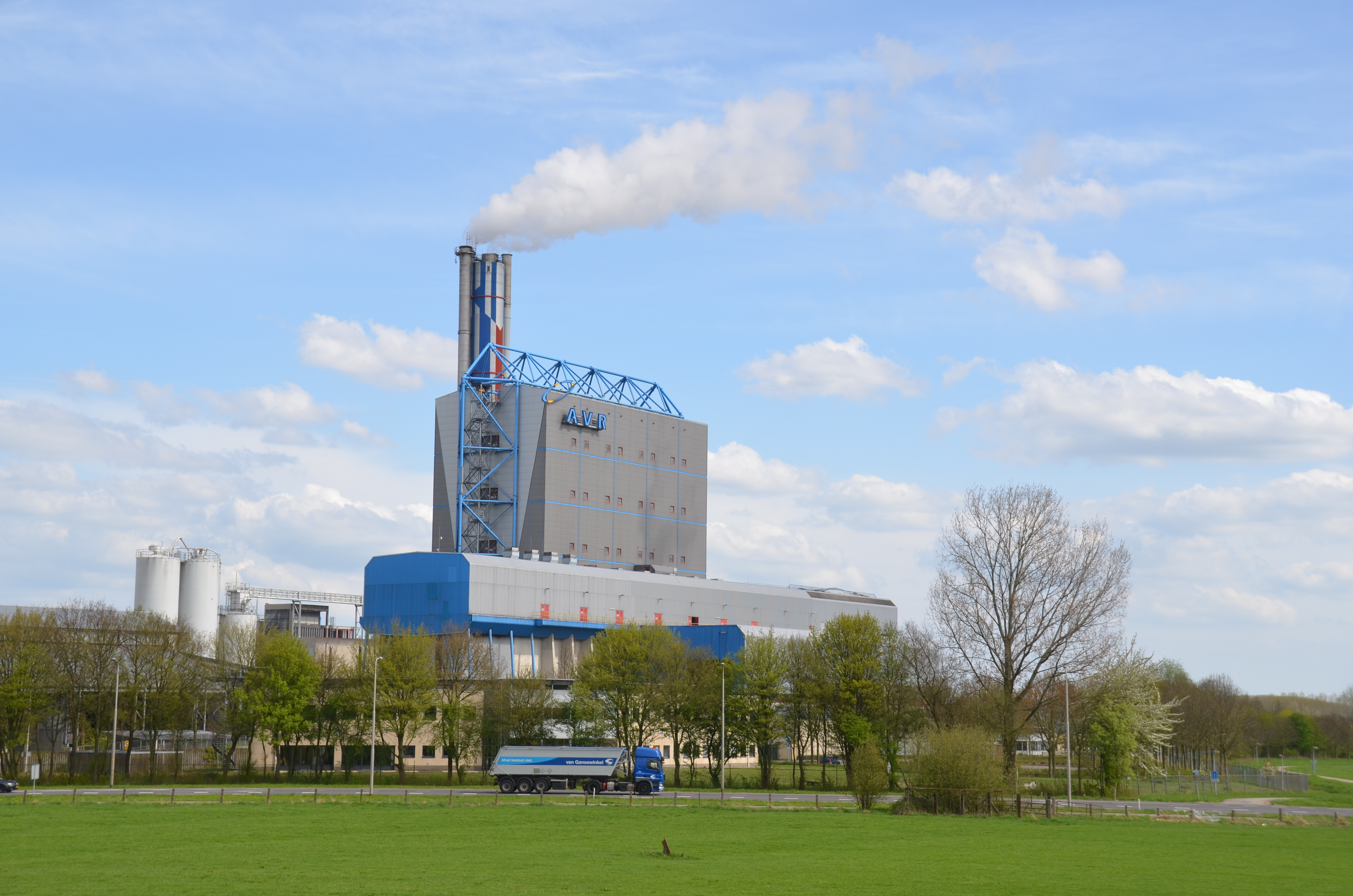
Rubbish incineration plant at Westervoort
